= 947 =

Calendar year

947 in various calendars
- Gregorian calendar: 947; CMXLVII
- Ab urbe condita: 1700
- Armenian calendar: 396; ԹՎ ՅՂԶ
- Assyrian calendar: 5697
- Balinese saka calendar: 868–869
- Bengali calendar: 353–354
- Berber calendar: 1897
- Buddhist calendar: 1491
- Burmese calendar: 309
- Byzantine calendar: 6455–6456
- Chinese calendar: 丙午年 (Fire Horse); 3644 or 3437 — to — 丁未年 (Fire Goat); 3645 or 3438
- Coptic calendar: 663–664
- Discordian calendar: 2113
- Ethiopian calendar: 939–940
- Hebrew calendar: 4707–4708
- Hindu calendars
- Vikram Samvat: 1003–1004
- Shaka Samvat: 868–869
- Kali Yuga: 4047–4048
- Holocene calendar: 10947
- Iranian calendar: 325–326
- Islamic calendar: 335–336
- Japanese calendar: Tengyō 10 / Tenryaku 1 (天暦元年)
- Javanese calendar: 847–848
- Julian calendar: 947; CMXLVII
- Korean calendar: 3280
- Minguo calendar: 965 before ROC 民前965年
- Nanakshahi calendar: −521
- Seleucid era: 1258/1259 AG
- Thai solar calendar: 1489–1490
- Tibetan calendar: མེ་ཕོ་རྟ་ལོ་ (male Fire-Horse); 1073 or 692 or −80 — to — མེ་མོ་ལུག་ལོ་ (female Fire-Sheep); 1074 or 693 or −79

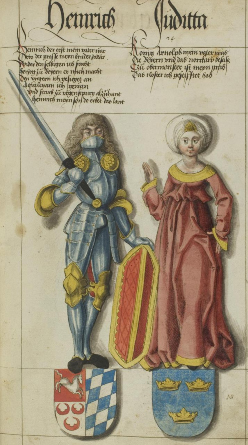
Henry I of Bavaria and his wife Judith.

Year 947 (CMXLVII) was a common year starting on Friday of the Julian calendar.

== Events ==
=== By place ===
==== Europe ====
- Summer – A Hungarian army led by Grand Prince Taksony campaigns in Italy, heading southwards on the eastern shore of the peninsula. It besieges Larino and reaches Otranto, plundering Apulia for three months. Berengar of Ivrea negotiates a truce and offers them a massive tribute (for which he imposes a special tax).
- Winter – King Otto I cedes the Duchy of Bavaria to his brother Henry I. To secure his rule, Henry is married to Judith, a daughter of Arnulf I ("the Bad"), and appoints a series of counts palatine.

==== England ====
- Horsham, a market town on the upper reaches of the Aran River in West Sussex, is first mentioned in 'King Eadred's land charter' (see History of Horsham).

==== Arabian Empire ====
- August 19 – Abu Yazid, a Kharijite Berber leader who has led a rebellion against the Fatimid Caliphate in Ifriqiya, is defeated in the Hodna Mountains (modern-day Algeria). Caliph al-Mansur bi-Nasr Allah sets about restoring the Fatimid dominion over North Africa.

==== China ====
- January 11 – Emperor Tai Zong of the Khitan-led Liao Dynasty invades the Later Jin (Five Dynasties), resulting in the destruction of the Later Jin. Khitan forces head southwards to the Yellow River, but must return to their base in present-day Beijing in May after Tai Zong dies of an illness.
- March 10 – The Later Han is founded by Liu Zhiyuan, the military governor (jiedushi) of Bingzhou. He declares himself emperor (formally called Gaozu) and establishes the capital in Bian, present-day Kaifeng.

=== By topic ===
==== Literature ====
- Al-Masudi, an Arab historian and geographer, completes his large-scale work The Meadows of Gold and Mines of Gems, a historical book about the beginning of the world, starting with Adam and Eve.

== Births ==
- Al-Qadir, Abbasid caliph of Baghdad (d. 1031)
- Fujiwara no Koshi, Japanese empress (d. 979)
- Raja Raja Chola I, king of Chola Kingdom (d. 1014)

== Deaths ==
- January 12 – Sang Weihan, Chinese chief of staff (b. 898)
- January 27 – Zhang Yanze, Chinese general and governor
- January 28 – Jing Yanguang, Chinese general (b. 892)
- May 18 – Tai Zong, emperor of the Liao Dynasty (b. 902)
- May 30 – Ma Xifan, king of Chu (Ten Kingdoms) (b. 899)
- June 21 – Zhang Li, official of the Liao Dynasty
- June 22 – Qian Hongzuo, king of Wuyue (b. 928)
- June 23
  - Li Congyi, prince of Later Tang (b. 931)
  - Wang, imperial consort of Later Tang
- August 19 – Abu Yazid, Kharijite Berber leader (b. 873)
- November 23 – Berthold, duke of Bavaria
- Ce Acatl Topiltzin, Toltec ruler (approximate date)
- Hugh of Arles, king of Italy and Lower Burgundy
- Jordi, bishop of Vic (Spain) (approximate date)
- Li Renda, Chinese warlord and governor
- Liu Xu, chancellor of Later Tang and Later Jin (b. 888)
- Thomais of Lesbos, Byzantine saint (b. ca. 909)
- Wulfgar, bishop of Lichfield (approximate date)
