= Consort Dowager An =

Consort Dowager An (Chinese: 安太妃; personal name unknown) (died 949) was the mother of Shi Chonggui (Emperor Chu), the second and final emperor of the Chinese Later Jin dynasty. As he inherited his throne from his uncle (Lady An's brother-in-law) Shi Jingtang (Emperor Gaozu), he honored Shi Jingtang's wife Empress Li empress dowager, leaving Lady An with the lesser title of consort dowager. After Later Jin's destruction by the Khitan-led Liao dynasty, she followed him into exile deep in Liao territory and died there.

== Background ==
It is not known when Lady An was born. Little is known about her family background beyond that she was from the Daibei region (代北, i.e., the region around and north of modern Xinzhou, Shanxi). Her husband Shi Jingru (石敬儒) was a cavalry officer of Li Cunxu the Prince of Jin. She gave birth to their only known child, Shi Chonggui, in 914. Shi Jingru died early, and so Shi Chonggui was raised by and adopted by his younger brother, Shi Jingtang.

== During Later Jin ==
In 936, Shi Jingtang, then a Later Tang general, rebelled against Later Tang's final emperor Li Congke and founded Later Jin. He, with aid from Later Tang's northern rival Khitan Empire's Emperor Taizong, then destroyed Later Tang and took over its territory. In 938, he created Shi Chonggui the Prince of Zheng. At some point (presumably around that time), Lady An was created the Lady of Qin.

In 942, Shi Jingtang died. Before his death, he had intended that his only surviving son Shi Chongrui (石重睿) inherit the throne and had entrusted Shi Chongrui to the senior chancellor Feng Dao, but Feng, in consultation with the imperial guard general Jing Yanguang, believed that the state needed an older emperor, and therefore supported Shi Chonggui, then the Prince of Qi, to succeed Shi Jingtang. Shi Chonggui honored Shi Jingtang's wife Empress Li as empress dowager (and Shi Jingtang's mother or stepmother Empress Dowager Liu as grand empress dowager), but did not immediately honor his own mother. In 943 (by which time Grand Empress Dowager Liu had died), he honored Lady An consort dowager. It was said that Shi Chonggui served both Consort Dowager An and Empress Dowager Li diligently, often attending to their meals. What, if any, influence she had on his governance, including his subsequent renouncing of subservience to the Khitan emperor (whose state had been renamed Liao by this point), was not recorded in history.

== After Later Jin's destruction ==
In winter 946, Emperor Taizong personally led an army and, after defeating and forcing the surrender of the Later Jin general Du Wei (the husband of a sister of Shi Jingru's and Shi Jingtang's), advanced on then-Later Jin capital Kaifeng. Shi Chonggui surrendered, ending Later Jin. Emperor Taizong then prepared to send him and his family into exile, deep in desolate Liao proper. Consort Dowager An was said to be old and blind at that point, but was sent into exile with him, Empress Dowager Li, his wife Empress Feng, Shi Chongrui, and Shi Chonggui's adoptive sons (Shi Jingtang's biological grandsons) Shi Yanxu (石延煦) and Shi Yanbao (石延寶). (Emperor Taizong extended Empress Dowager Li an offer not to be exiled, but she declined, choosing to share Shi Chonggui's fate; Consort Dowager An was not said to have been given such an offer.)

In 949, by which time Liao was ruled by Emperor Taizong's nephew Emperor Shizong, the Shi household had settled at Liaoyang (遼陽, in modern Liaoyang, Liaoning), but was apparently separated from any ethnic Han. Empress Dowager Li decided to go meet Emperor Shizong herself, asking to be resettled near a Han city and be given land for agriculture. Emperor Shizong agreed, and decided to move them to Jian Prefecture (建州, in modern Chaoyang, Liaoning). While they were on the trek to Jian, Consort Dowager An died. As she was dying, she gave the instruction, "You should burn my bones and toss the ashes to the south. May it be that my spirit may return to Han lands." However, her instructions were not completely followed. Her body was burned (but as there were not sufficient plants for firewood around, a wagon or wagons had to be dismantled to be used as fuel), and either her ashes or charred bones were taken to Jian Prefecture. After Empress Dowager Li died not long after and her body was also burned, they were buried together.

== Notes and references ==
- New History of the Five Dynasties, vol. 17.
- Zizhi Tongjian, vols. 283, 286, 288.
