= Li Song (official) =

Chinese politician

Li Song (Chinese: 李崧) (died December 12, 948), nickname Dachou (大醜), was an official of the Chinese Five Dynasties and Ten Kingdoms Period states Later Tang, Later Jin, and Later Han, as well as the Khitan-led Liao dynasty. He was particularly prominent during Later Jin, when he served as chief of staff (Shumishi) and chancellor. During Later Han, he was falsely accused of treason and executed.

== Background ==
It is not known when Li Song was born, but it is known that he was from Raoyang (饒陽, in modern Hengshui, Hebei). His father Li Shunqing (李舜卿) was the tactical officer at Shen Prefecture (深州, in modern Hengshui), which Raoyang belonged to. He had at least two younger brothers, Li Yu (李嶼) and Li Yi (李㠖). Li Shunqing was a descendant of Li Lin (李𬭸). Li Lin said to be 6th generation descendant of Li Yuanyi, Prince Zhenghui (鄭惠王, 李元懿), who was a 13th son of Emperor Gaozu of Tang. It was said that he was intelligent in his youth, and was writing artful texts even when he was in his teenage years, surprising his family members. Once he reached adulthood, he became an officer at Shen Prefecture. (Historical descriptions do not give dates, or even the sovereigns that he was under, during these events.)

== During Later Tang ==
=== During Li Cunxu's reign ===
However, it is known that by 923 — at which time Li Cunxu had declared himself emperor of a new Later Tang and had commissioned his oldest son Li Jiji the defender of Zhending (真定, in modern Shijiazhuang, Hebei) and the director of Xingsheng Palace (興聖宮) — Li Song was serving on Li Jiji's staff as an officer. At that time, Li Jiji's secretary Li Rao (李蕘) was in charge of Li Jiji's correspondences. Li Song had seen some of Li Rao's writings and considered them poorly written, He secretly spoke with the head of Li Jiji's household, Lü Rou (呂柔), stating, "The Lord Chancellor [(as Li Jiji carried an honorary chancellor title)] is the Emperor's son. The whole realm looks at him. Both his correspondences and his records need to be logically and properly written. The drafts written by Censor Li [(as Li Rao carried an honorary censor title)] lacked perfection." Lü asked Li Song to try to write for Li Jiji on a trial basis, and then showed what Li Song had written to Li Cunxu's secretaries Lu Zhi (盧質) and Feng Dao, both of whom praised Li Song's writing. Li Song was therefore soon promoted to be the surveying officer for Xingsheng Palace, and put in charge of Li Jiji's correspondences. After Li Cunxu conquered archrival Later Liang later in the year and made Luoyang his capital, he gave Li Song the title of Xielü Lang (協律郎).

In 925, Li Cunxu commissioned Li Jiji, who carried the title of Prince of Wei by that point, as the supreme commander of an army against Later Tang's southwestern neighbor Former Shu, with the major general Guo Chongtao serving as Li Jiji's deputy and actually in charge of the operation. Li Jiji made Li Song his secretary on the campaign. The Later Tang army was soon able to destroy Former Shu. However, after Former Shu's fall, both Li Cunxu and his wife (Li Jiji's mother) Empress Liu suspected Guo of plotting rebellion, and Empress Liu, even though she did not have agreement from Li Cunxu, issued an order to Li Jiji that he kill Guo. Li Jiji, after receiving her order, ambushed Guo and killed him. Hearing this, Li Song quickly went to see Li Jiji, lamenting to him, "Now the army is 3,000 li away from the capital. Why did Your Royal Highness carry out the dangerous act of killing a major general without an imperial edict? Why cannot you wait until getting back to Luoyang?" Li Jiji responded that he regretted the decision, but it had already been done. Li Song then summoned several scribes and secretly forged an imperial edict, using Li Jiji's seal to pretend to be an imperial seal in stamping the edict. Only after that did the army acquiesce.

The deaths of Guo and, subsequently, his ally and fellow major general Zhu Youqian, however, spawned a number of mutinies in the Later Tang army. In summer 926, Li Cunxu was killed in a mutiny at Luoyang itself. His adoptive brother Li Siyuan entered Luoyang and claimed the title of regent. Li Jiji, who was then withdrawing his army back from Former Shu's capital Chengdu back to Luoyang, headed for Luoyang, trying to contend for imperial title, but his army began to desert him. He committed suicide, and the army subsequently returned to Luoyang under the command of his general Ren Huan and submitted to Li Siyuan.

=== During Li Siyuan's reign ===
Ren Huan subsequently became a chancellor for Li Siyuan. He also was in charge of the three financial agencies (taxation, treasury, and salt and iron monopolies), and he made Li Song his assistant for salt and iron monopolies. Later, when Li Song's mother died, Li Song left governmental service to observe a mourning period for her. After the mourning period was over, Fan Yanguang, who was then the military governor of Chengde Circuit (成德, headquartered at Zhending), made Li Song his secretary, in charge of the communications. When Fan was later recalled to the imperial government to serve as chief of staff (Shumishi), Li Song became a member of the office of chief of staff. While serving there, his title gradually rose from Shiyi (拾遺), to Bujue (補闕, both consultant titles), to imperial chronicler (起居郎, Qiju Lang), to a supervisory position at the executive bureau of government (尚書省, Shangshu Sheng). Near the end of Li Siyuan's Changxing era (930-933), Li Song became an imperial scholar (翰林學士, Hanlin Xueshi).

As of 932, Later Tang's northern rival Khitan Empire was making repeated incursions into Later Tang territory. Li Siyuan wanted an appropriate military governor for Hedong Circuit (河東, headquartered in modern Taiyuan, Shanxi) to combat the Khitan incursions. Li Siyuan's son-in-law Shi Jingtang, who wanted to avoid conflicts with Li Siyuan's oldest surviving son Li Congrong the Prince of Qin, wanted the Hedong military governorship, but Fan and his fellow chief of staff, Zhao Yanshou (also a son-in-law to Li Siyuan) wanted to commission the general Kang Yicheng (康義誠), and therefore the matter was unsettled for a while. During a meeting at the office of the chief of staff, it was Li Song who spoke up in favor of commissioning Shi. Li Siyuan happened to be sending emissaries to the meeting at that time to rush the decision, so Fan and Zhao acquiesced. Shi was then made the military governor of Hedong. When Shi became aware that it was Li Song who advocated for his commission, he sent Li Song a message of appreciation.

=== After Li Siyuan's reign ===
Li Siyuan died in 933 (after a disturbance in which Li Congrong tried to seize power but was defeated and killed). Another of his sons, Li Conghou the Prince of Song, succeeded him as emperor. In 934, LI Siyuan's adoptive son Li Congke the Prince of Lu overthrew Li Conghou and became emperor. Li Song became one of the officials Li Congke frequently consulted, along with Li Zhuanmei (李專美), Lü Qi (呂琦), Xue Wenyu (薛文遇), and Zhao Yan'ai (趙延乂).

Li Congke and Shi had long disliked each other. Li Congke frequently suspected Shi of plotting rebellion, and a major concern at the time in Li Congke's inner circle was that Shi would seek aid from the Khitan in such a rebellion. Li Song and Lü advocated entering into a peace treaty with the Khitan by returning a number of Khitan officers that Later Tang had earlier captured and giving a large amount of money to the Khitan. The chancellor Zhang Yanlang, who then oversaw the three financial agencies, supported the idea. Li Congke initially was in favor as well, and had Li Song and Lü draft a proposed letter to Khitan's Emperor Taizong to suggest the treaty. However, Xue opposed, and argued that the Khitan emperor would insist on having Li Congke's young daughter marry him (or his son). Li Congke thus changed his mind, and one day thereafter summoned Li Song and Lü to rebuke them. They apologized profusely and were spared, but their proposal was not considered again. Li Congke also distanced himself away from Lü, although apparently Li Song remained part of the inner circle.

Li Congke then considered moving Shi to another circuit. Then-chief of staff Fang Gao and Li Song (and Lü, prior to Lü's departure from his inner circle) all strenuously opposed, believing that would provoke Shi into a rebellion. However, one night, when Li Song had the night off and Xue was on duty, Li Congke consulted Xue by himself, and Xue argued that Shi would eventually rebel anyway — that having him rebel earlier was better than having him rebel later. Li Congke agreed. Shortly after, he issued an edict moving Shi from Hedong to Tianping Circuit (天平, headquartered in modern Tai'an, Shandong). Shi, as expected, rebelled and sought aid from Khitan's Emperor Taizong. Emperor Taizong launched an army to aid him, and their joint forces defeated the Later Tang army Li Congke sent, under the command of the general Zhang Jingda. Zhang was killed by his deputy Yang Guangyuan, who then surrendered to the joint Khitan/Hedong forces. Emperor Taizong declared Shi the emperor of a new Later Jin, and they advanced south. Believing the situation to be hopeless, Li Congke committed suicide with his family, ending Later Tang. Shi entered Luoyang and took over Later Tang territory.

== During Later Jin ==
=== During Shi Jingtang's reign ===
At the time that Shi Jingtang entered Luoyang, Li Song and Lü Qi hid themselves among the people at Yijue (伊闕, in modern Luoyang). Shi discovered this. He was still grateful to Li Song for having spoken for his military governorship at Hedong and also respected Lü for what he believed to be Lü's correct recommendation to Li Congke to enter into a peace treaty with the Khitan, and therefore restored both of them to governmental positions. In Li Song's case, he was made the deputy minister of defense (兵部侍郎, Bingbu Shilang) and put in charge of taxation. Shortly after, he further promoted Li Song to be Zhongshu Shilang (中書侍郎, the deputy head of the legislative bureau (中書省, Zhongshu Sheng)) as well as chancellor, with the designation of Tong Zhongshu Menxia Pingzhangshi (同中書門下平章事). He was also made chief of staff, serving with Sang Weihan. However, this displeased Liu Churang (who wanted to be chief of staff) and Yang Guangyuan, who was then sieging Fan Yanguang at Tianxiong Circuit (天雄, headquartered in modern Handan, Hebei) as Fan had rebelled against Shi earlier in the year (as Sang was putting curbs on Yang's power). Yang thus submitted a petition arguing that chancellors should not also be chiefs of staff. Shi felt compelled to remove both Sang and Li Song as chiefs of staff. Li Song was given the additional title of minister of public works (工部尚書, Gongbu Shangshu), while Liu was made chief of staff.

In 941, Shi made his general Liu Zhiyuan, who was then the commander of the imperial guards, the military governor of Hedong. At the recommendations of Li Song and Feng Dao (who was then also chancellor), Shi's brother-in-law Du Chongwei, whom Liu despised, succeeded Liu as the commander of the imperial guards. It was said that Liu resented Li and Feng from this point on. Li accompanied Shi to Yedu (鄴都, i.e., Tianxiong's capital, also known as Wei Prefecture (魏州)) later in the year, as Shi was then anticipating a rebellion by An Chongrong the military governor of Chengde. Apparently while Li was at Yedu, his father died, and he left governmental service briefly to observe a mourning period, but Shi immediately recalled him to the imperial government without a lengthy mourning period.

=== During Shi Chonggui's reign ===
Shi Jingtang died in summer 941 and was succeeded as emperor by his nephew Shi Chonggui the Prince of Qi. One immediate question was how the Later Jin court would report this news to Emperor Taizong (who had changed his state's name from Khitan to Liao by this point). Shi Jingtang had earlier, not only submitted to Liao as a subject, but referred to Emperor Taizong as "father emperor" while referring to himself as "son emperor." The officials largely wanted Shi Chonggui to submit a report (as a subject) and refer to himself as "subject." The general Jing Yanguang, who supported Shi Chonggui's ascendency and who was then made a chancellor as well, however, opposed, suggesting that Shi Chonggui merely write a letter (i.e., to show equality between the states, rather than submission) in which he would merely refer to himself as "grandson" and not subject. Li Song opposed Jing, pointing out that this would lead to discord and war between the two states. Feng Dao took no position, and Shi Chonggui eventually agreed with Jing. This led to Emperor Taizong to angrily respond, through an emissary, "How do you dare to take the throne without first reporting to me?" Jing authored the response, with rudeness, to that rebuke, precipitating an eventual war between Later Jin and Liao, particularly given that Zhao Yanshou, then a Liao general, was urging Emperor Taizong to wage a war, as he himself wanted to become emperor of China.

By 944, Sang Weihan was again chief of staff and chancellor, and was said to control the army with discipline, enabling its effectiveness in battles against Liao. Shi Chonggui's brother-in-law Feng Yu and another close associate, Li Yantao (李彥韜), however, disliked Sang, and frequently defamed him before Shi. Shi thus considered removing Sang, but did not do so, at the urging of Li Song and Liu Xu. However, he made Feng also a chief of staff, to divide Sang's power. In late 945, Shi finally removed Sang as chief of staff and chancellor, making him the mayor of then-capital Kaifeng. Li Song was made chief of staff to replace Sang in that capacity, while Zhao Ying, who already carried a chancellor title but was acting as mayor of Kaifeng, was made full chancellor to replace Sang in that capacity.

In 946, Emperor Taizong decided to create a trap for Later Jin. He spread false news that Zhao Yanshou was intending to defect to Later Jin, rumors that were believed by Feng and Li Song. They had Du Chongwei (whose name had been changed to Du Wei by that point due to naming taboo for Shi Chonggui's name), who was then the military governor of Tianxiong, write a secret letter to Zhao, to see if Zhao intended to defect. Zhao, who was part of Emperor Taizong's plan, wrote back and indicated that, indeed, he wanted to defect, along with his Lulong Circuit (盧龍, headquartered in Beijing — which had previously been Later Tang territory but which Shi Jingtang, as part of the agreement in which Emperor Taizong aided him to become emperor, ceded to Emperor Taizong); in his letter, he asked for a major Later Jin army to be launched to support his defection. After discussions between Shi Chonggui, Feng, and Li Song, it was agreed that a large army would be launched, commanded by Du, with Li Shouzhen serving as his deputy. (This was opposed by Zhao Ying, who believed that Du was untrustworthy due to his unthankful nature, but Zhao Ying was not listened to.)

Du's army was soon launched, but as it approached Liao territory, was met by a large, highly mobile Liao army commanded by Emperor Taizong himself. It tried to retreat, but became encircled by the Liao army at Zhongdu Bridge (中度橋, in modern Baoding, Hebei). After Emperor Taizong made a promise (which he would eventually repudiate) to have Du made emperor, Du and Li Shouzhen surrendered with their army. As virtually the entire Later Jin imperial army was under Du's command, Kaifeng was left defenseless, and the Liao army advanced quickly toward it. Shi Chonggui surrendered, ending Later Jin.

== During Liao ==
After Kaifeng's fall to Liao, Shi Chonggui and his family (including Shi Jingtang's wife Empress Dowager Li) were put under house arrest by the Liao general (formerly a subordinate of Du Wei's), Zhang Yanze, whom Emperor Taizong sent as forward commander to take control of the city. Li Song took a dissociative approach as far as his former emperor was concerned — including finding excuses not to go when Shi requested the presence of both him and Li Yantao. Emperor Taizong soon arrived at Kaifeng and claimed to be the emperor of China as well. With both Zhao Yanshou and Zhang Li recommending Li Song for his talent, Emperor Taizong made Li Song a chief of staff, and also gave him the honorary title Taizi Taishi (太子太師). Emperor Taizong made the comment, "All I gained by destroying the southern dynasty was Li Song."

Meanwhile, Zhao, finally realizing that Emperor Taizong had no intent on fulfilling his promise to make Zhao emperor of China, had Li Song request, on his behalf, for him to be made crown prince. Emperor Taizong, citing the fact that the Crown Prince should be a son of the emperor, also refused that request, although he gave Zhao a number of additional honorary titles.

Initially, nearly all of Later Jin military governors submitted to Emperor Taizong, but with Emperor Taizong allowing the ethnic Khitan soldiers to pillage the Central Plains region, many Han rebellions soon overtook the territory. Tiring of dealing with these rebellions, he decided to leave his brother-in-law Xiao Han in charge at Kaifeng, while he himself headed back to Liao's main territory. On the way, however, he fell ill, and died near Chengde's capital Heng Prefecture (恆州, i.e., Zhending).

In the aftermaths of Emperor Taizong's death, Zhao wanted to seize what remained of Liao-controlled former Later Jin territory, but not wanting to yet break with Liao, he only claimed that Emperor Taizong left an edict authorizing him to oversee the southern court (i.e., the former Later Jin territory). At the same time, unknown to Zhao, the Khitan generals at Heng were secretly meeting and agreed to support Emperor Taizong's nephew Yelü Ruan the Prince of Yongkang as the new emperor. Unaware of this development, Zhao prepared to hold a semi-imperial ascension ceremony, in which the officials and generals would all bow to him. Li Song, pointing out to him that it was uncertain whether the Khitan generals would agree, persuaded him not to hold the ceremony. Shortly after, Yelü Ruan used trickery to arrest Zhao, and commented to Zhang Li that had Li Song not talked Zhao out of holding the ceremony, the Khitan army would have overrun the ceremony and killed everyone present. He then declared himself emperor (as Emperor Shizong).

Emperor Shizong's succession to the Liao throne was immediately contested by his grandmother (the mother of both Emperor Taizong and his father, Yelü Bei), who wanted another son of hers, Yelü Lihu, to succeed to the throne. Emperor Shizong headed back to Liao's main territory to engage his grandmother's army, while leaving a Khitan army, along with the remainder of the captured Han army, as well as most of the Han officials (including Li Song and fellow captured chancellors Feng Dao and He Ning), at Heng, leaving Emperor Taizong's cousin Yelü Mada (耶律麻荅) in charge at Heng. Yelü Mada mistreated both the people of the region and the Han soldiers. When Emperor Shizong subsequently sent emissaries to summon Feng, He, and Li Song to join him for Emperor Taizong's funeral, the Han soldiers decided to mutiny, and a street battle developed in Heng. The battle initially did not go well for the Han mutineers, but the official Li Gu persuaded Feng, Li Song, and He to appear at the battle. When the Han soldiers saw the chancellors, their morale was greatly increased, and they eventually defeated the Khitan soldiers under Yelü Mada, who fled back to Liao territory. In the aftermaths of the battle, the city became controlled by the officer Bai Zairong (白再榮), who had the soldiers surround Li Song's and He's residences, demanding treasury. Li Song and He surrendered all their treasure, but Bai then considered killing them to prevent reprisal later, but Li Gu talked him out of it, pointing out that the new emperor (i.e., Liu Zhiyuan, who had established Later Han and taken over the Central Plains by this point) would punish him if he frivolously killed the chancellors. Bai therefore did not kill them.

== During Later Han ==
After the Heng mutiny, Li Song, along with Feng Dao and He Ning, returned to Kaifeng to submit to Liu Zhiyuan. None of them, however, was given a key position, but only honorific titles — in Li Song's case, Taizi Taifu (太子太傅).

While Li Song was with the Liao army at Heng, however, Liu, apparently believing that both Feng and Li Song had turned their loyalty over to Liao, awarded their mansions at Kaifeng to his key followers (and by this point, chancellors) Su Yugui and Su Fengji, respectively. Su Fengji thus also took control of all of the precious items that Li Song had collected over the years, and further seized Li Song's mansion at Luoyang. After Li Song's return to Later Han, he knew that he lacked allies at the Later Han court, and therefore was carefully dealing with the new powerful Later Han officials with respect. However, his brothers Li Yu and Li Yi were not as careful, and, as they were colleagues at the Later Han court with Su Fengji's brothers and sons, they were occasionally drinking together, and they made such statements as, "You seized our houses and savings!" Su Fengji thus began to be apprehensive of Li Song. When Li Song then offered the deeds of the mansions to Su, rather than being soothed, Su was further displeased.

In 948, by which time Liu Zhiyuan had died, and his son Liu Chengyou was emperor, there was a time when Li Yu had discovered his servant Ge Yanyu (葛延遇) to be embezzling from him, and was trying to force Ge to return the embezzled funds. Ge thus decided to, in conjunction with Su's servant Li Cheng (李澄), accuse Li Yu of treason. Su then put Li Song under arrest as well. Subsequently, under torture, Li Yu wrote out a confession in which he implicated not only himself, but Li Song and Li Yi, as well as his nephew Wang Ning (王凝), of plotting a rebellion at Kaifeng, in conspiracy with Li Shouzhen, who had earlier rebelled at Huguo Circuit (護國, headquartered in modern Yuncheng, Shanxi), and Liao. Li Song, believing that he could not escape, also confessed. His entire family was executed, and the people lamented for them.

== Notes and references ==
- Old History of the Five Dynasties, vol. 108.
- New History of the Five Dynasties, vol. 57.
- Zizhi Tongjian, vols. 274, 278, 279, 280, 281, 282, 283, 284, 285, 286, 287, 288.
