= Sang Weihan =

Chinese general (898–947)

- 桑維翰
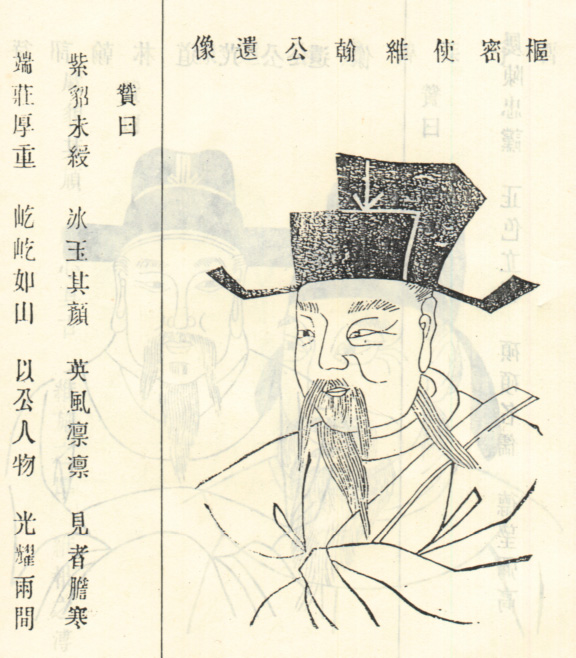
- Born: 898; Tang dynasty
- Died: January 12, 947; Kaifeng, Later Jin dynasty
- Occupation: Politician
- Era: Five Dynasties and Ten Kingdoms Period

Sang Weihan (桑維翰) (898 – January 12, 947), courtesy name Guoqiao (國僑), formally the Duke of Wei (魏公), was a Chinese historian, military general, poet, and politician of the Five Dynasties and Ten Kingdoms Period state Later Jin, serving as chief of staff (Shumishi) during the reigns of both of Later Jin's emperors, Shi Jingtang and Shi Chonggui. While not a soldier by training, he was said to be capable and respected as the overseer of the armies of the realm.

== Background ==
Sang Weihan was born in 898, during the reign of Emperor Zhaozong of Tang. He was from the Tang dynasty eastern capital Luoyang — as his father Sang Gong (桑珙) was a "guest general" (客將, kejiang) under Zhang Quanyi, the mayor of Henan Municipality (河南, i.e., the Luoyang region). (The fact that Sang Gong was described as a "guest general" suggests that Sang Gong himself was not from Luoyang or vicinity, but later joined Zhang's army after first having served under another warlord.)

Sang Weihan was said to have an unusual, repulsive appearance — short in stature, with a very long face. However, it was said that he considered his appearance to be a reason to have great ambition. When he submitted himself for imperial examinations, however, the chief examiners initially did not want to pass him, because they disliked his surname Sang (a homophone of 喪, "funeral"). When others, hearing of this, tried to dissuade him from submitting for the imperial examinations, he was lamenting and yet not discouraged, and wrote a poem entitled, "Ode to the Sun Rising from Fusang" to declare his ambition. He eventually passed the imperial examinations during the Tongguang era (923-926) of Later Tang's emperor Li Cunxu.

== Service under Shi Jingtang during Later Tang ==
During the subsequent reign of Li Cunxu's adoptive brother and successor Li Siyuan, Li Siyuan's son-in-law Shi Jingtang served as the military governor (Jiedushi) of Heyang Circuit (河陽, headquartered in modern Jiaozuo, Henan). He invited Sang Weihan to serve as his secretary in charge of communications. When Shi was subsequently transferred to Hedong Circuit (河東, headquartered in modern Taiyuan, Shanxi) in 932, Sang followed him to Hedong.

In 936, then-emperor Li Congke (Li Siyuan's adoptive son), suspicious of Shi, issued an edict transferring Shi to Tianping Circuit (天平, headquartered in modern Tai'an, Shandong). Shi, fearful of the consequences, convened his chief staff members to discuss how to react to it. Most of them advised that he resist the order. However, it was Sang who pointed out that Li Congke, as an adoptive son of Li Siyuan's, lacked legitimacy and popular support, and that if Shi had the support of Later Tang's northern rival Khitan Empire, he had chance to overthrow Li Congke. Shi thus resolved to rebel against Later Tang. He had Sang draft for him a petition to Khitan's Emperor Taizong, offering, in exchange for military support, to submit as subject and son, as well as cede Lulong Circuit (盧龍, headquartered in modern Beijing) as well as other Later Tang territory north of the Yanmen Pass to the Khitan, despite the misgivings of the general Liu Zhiyuan. Shi's offer enticed Emperor Taizong, and he agreed to launch troops.

The Later Tang general Zhang Jingda soon put Hedong's capital Taiyuan under siege, but was unable to capture it quickly. Emperor Taizong then arrived with Khitan troops, and the joint Khitan/Hedong troops crushed Zhang's troops and then put the remnants of his army under siege at Jin'an Base (晉安寨, near Taiyuan). Meanwhile, Emperor Taizong declared Shi the emperor of China (as the emperor of a new state of Later Jin).

== During Later Jin ==
=== During Shi Jingtang's reign ===
==== During Shi's takeover of Later Tang territory ====
Upon Emperor Taizong's declaration of him as emperor, Shi Jingtang formed his imperial government. He made Sang Weihan imperial scholar (翰林學士, Hanlin Xueshi) and deputy minister of rites (禮部侍郎, Libu Shilang), acting as chief of staff.

However, despite the Khitan/Hedong victory over Zhang Jingda, the remnants of Zhang's army held out at Jin'an for some time, and a relief army under the command of the Later Tang general Zhao Dejun was approaching, causing apprehensions in Emperor Taizong's mind. Zhao, however, was disloyal to Later Tang, and made secret overtures to Emperor Taizong that if Emperor Taizong supported him to be emperor of China instead, he would ally with the Khitan to destroy Later Tang and further promise that Shi could retain Hedong. Emperor Taizong was enticed. When Shi heard this, he became fearful, and he sent Sang to the Khitan camp to dissuade Emperor Taizong. Sang pointed out that Shi would serve Khitan interests loyally as emperor of China and that the treacherous Zhao could not be trusted. He also knelt in front of Emperor Taizong's tent for an entire day, pleading his case. Emperor Taizong was touched, and responded to Zhao's emissary, pointing to a rock, "I have already made my promise to Master Shi. Only if this rock rots would I change my mind." He also stated to Shi, "Sang Weihan is faithful to you. He should be chancellor."

Meanwhile, with no army coming to its aid, Zhang's army fell into desperate shape at Jin'an. Zhang's deputy Yang Guangyuan assassinated him and surrendered the army to the combined Khitan/Later Jin army. The Khitan/Later Jin army then prepared to head toward Zhao's army, and then to the Later Tang capital Luoyang. Apparently pursuant to Emperor Taizong's suggestion, Shi commissioned Sang and fellow staff member Zhao Ying chancellors (同中書門下平章事, Tong Zhongshu Menxia Pingzhangshi), with Sang also receiving the additional title of Zhongshu Shilang (中書侍郎) and Zhao Ying Menxia Shilang (門下侍郎); Sang also continued to act as chief of staff. The Khitan/Later Jin army then crushed Zhao Dejun's army, forcing him and his adoptive son Zhao Yanshou to surrender. (Emperor Taizong subsequently took Zhao Dejun and Zhao Yanshou captive and had them taken to Khitan proper.) Emperor Taizong then decided to let Shi and his Later Jin army head toward Luoyang without the Khitan army (other than a small contingent), not wanting to disturb the Han Chinese of the region. As they parted each other, Emperor Taizong stated to Shi, "Liu Zhiyuan, Zhao Ying, and Sang Weihan are all great contributors to your establishment of the empire. Do not abandon them unless they had major faults." As Shi approached Luoyang, Li Congke, finding the situation hopeless, committed suicide with his family, ending Later Tang and allowing Later Jin to take over its territory.

==== After Shi's takeover of Later Tang territory ====
In spring 937, Shi Jingtang formally made Sang Weihan chief of staff, along with Li Song. It was said that at that time, Shi had just taken over Later Tang territory, and a number of military governors were either not following his orders, or were not fully faithful to him. (Indeed, there would be several rebellions against Later Jin in 937.) In the midst of all the military campaigns, the treasury was drained, and the people were poor. Further, the Khitan were repeatedly demanding tributes. Sang advised Shi to comfort the military governors and not bear grudges, humbly serve the Khitan and offer tributes, train the army and firm up the defenses, and encourage farming and trade. It was said that within several years, the realm became more secured.

Also in spring 937, Shi was considering moving the capital from Luoyang to Daliang. Sang encouraged the idea, pointing out that at that time, Fan Yanguang the military governor of Tianxiong Circuit (天雄, headquartered in modern Handan, Hebei) was apparently planning to rebel, and that a move to Daliang, being far closer to Tianxiong's capital Wei Prefecture (魏州) than Luoyang was, would allow quicker reaction against a potential Fan rebellion. Shi agreed and moved the capital to Daliang.

Fan did, indeed, rebel shortly after, and also persuaded the general Zhang Congbin (張從賓) to also rise at Luoyang. Zhang took over Luoyang and killed Shi's sons Shi Chongxin (石重信) the military governor of Heyang and Shi Chongyi (石重乂) the defender of Luoyang. It was said that at that time nearly every imperial official at Daliang was panicking over this turn of events, but Sang, as he was directing the campaigns against these rebels from the Office of Chief of Staff, was not shaken and continued to handle the situation calmly, thus calming the hearts of others who saw him as well. When Shi, with Zhang's army approaching Daliang, considered fleeing to Taiyuan, Sang urged him earnestly not to do so, and he changed his mind and remained at Daliang. Soon thereafter, the Later Jin forces were able to kill Zhang, and Fan, believing the situation to be hopeless, surrendered to Yang Guangyuan, whom Shi commissioned as the military governor of Tianxiong to replace Fan.

The victory over Fan left Yang being the most powerful general of the realm. This caused clashes between him and Sang, as he often made requests that were not in compliance with regulations, and Sang therefore rejected them. Shi's close associate Liu Churang also disliked the power that Sang and Li wielded as chiefs of staff. He thus encouraged Yang to express his displeasure to Shi. Shi felt compelled to remove Sang and Li as chiefs of staff, replacing them with Liu. Sang and Li remained chancellors, and Sang was given the additional post of minister of defense (兵部尚書, Bingbu Shangshu). However, subsequently, per Sang's suggestion (who believed Yang himself and the Tianxiong command to be too powerful), Shi moved Yang from Tianxiong to Heyang, and divided the Tianxiong command in three — converting Wei Prefecture to a standalone Yedu Municipality (鄴都), while diving the rest of Tianxiong into Zhangde (彰德, headquartered in modern Anyang, Henan) and Yongqing (永清, headquartered in modern Xingtai, Hebei), to weaken the command.

The power struggle between Yang and Sang continued, however. In 939, Yang accused Sang of being partial in his commissioning of officials; overly enriching himself with mansions in both Daliang and Luoyang; and making personal fortunes in competition with the people. Shi felt compelled to remove Sang as chancellor, sending him to Zhangde to serve as its military governor. Shi did give Sang the greater chancellor title of Shizhong (侍中) as an honorary title. When he got to Zhangde, he found out that there was a longstanding regulation there that any person captured for banditry within the circuit would have their entire family's assets confiscated. Sang, pointing out that there was actually no law allowing such confiscation, reported this to Shi, urging its abolition. Shi agreed, and issued an edict generally abolishing such confiscations throughout the realm, not just as applied to Zhangde. After about a year, Sang was moved to Taining Circuit (泰寧, headquartered in modern Jining, Shandong).

At that time, Shi was also faced with the prospect that An Chongrong the military governor of Chengde Circuit (成德, headquartered in modern Shijiazhuang, Hebei), who was antagonistic toward the Khitan (whose state had been renamed Liao by that point), was repeatedly trying to provoke Emperor Taizong, including aligning with the Tuyuhun tribesmen within Liao territory (that was ceded to Liao as part of Shi's agreement to cede the northern territories to Liao). An, in his rhetoric, was also rebuking Shi for being overly groveling to Liao and urging him to turn against Liao. Shi was initially hesitant to take action, because of An's military strength. Sang, hearing this, submitted a secret petition to Shi pointing out that it had been Khitan military strength that allowed him to establish his state, and he therefore should not turn against Liao — and further pointed out that An could be defeated if he rebelled. He encouraged Shi to temporarily move his court to Yedu, so that he could react against An quickly. Shi agreed and thanked Sang for his advice. When An subsequently rebelled, Shi, at Yedu, was able to send his brother-in-law Du Chongwei to crush An's rebellion quickly. After An's defeat, Sang went to Yedu to pay homage to Shi, and was thereafter made the military governor of Jinchang Circuit (晉昌, headquartered in modern Xi'an, Shaanxi).

=== During Shi Chonggui's reign ===
In 942, Shi Jingtang fell seriously ill. He initially entrusted his young (and only surviving) son Shi Chongrui (石重睿) to the chancellor Feng Dao, intending to have Shi Chongrui succeed him. After Shi Jingtang's death, Feng, in consultation with the imperial guard general Jing Yanguang, decided to declare Shi Jingtang's adoptive son and biological nephew Shi Chonggui the Prince of Qi as emperor, because they believed that the state needed an older emperor. In 942, Shi Chonggui recalled Sang Weihan from Jinchang to again be chancellor, with the title of Shizhong. Sang was also put in charge of editing the imperial history.

Because of his being instrumental in Shi Chonggui's becoming emperor, Jing was very powerful early in Shi Chonggui's reign as both chancellor and the commander of the imperial guards, and under his advocacy, Shi Chonggui turned away from Shi Jingtang's submissive posture toward Liao, and took a confrontational stance, taking the position that while personally, he was grandson to Emperor Taizong (because Shi Jingtang was son to Emperor Taizong), he and his state were not Liao subjects. Further, in 943, under Jing's advice, Shi Chonggui arrested the Liao trade emissary Qiao Rong (喬榮) and confiscated the goods that he was trading on Liao's behalf at Kaifeng. Sang repeatedly advised Shi Chonggui against taking provocative positions against Liao, to no avail, as he was opposed by Jing.

The Later Jin/Liao enmity led to a major Liao incursion, when Yang Guangyuan rebelled in spring 944, as Emperor Taizong wanted to support Yang's rebellion. The Later Jin army was able to defeat Yang and repel the Liao incursion, but by this point, the officials and generals resented Jing for his hold on power, and even Shi believed that Jing was difficult to control. Under Sang's advice, Shi sent Jing out of the capital to serve as Luoyang's defender, putting Gao Xingzhou in command of the imperial guards to replace him. Subsequently, believing that only Sang was capable of defending the state against Liao, Shi reestablished the office of chief of staff (which Shi Jingtang had abolished) and made Sang the chief of staff, in addition to chancellor (now with the title Zhongshu Ling). He also created Sang the Duke of Wei. He entrusted the affairs of the state to Sang, and it was said that within several months, the administration was in much better order. As described in the Zizhi Tongjian:

Sang Weihan was in charge of the administration twice. He ejected Yang Guangyuan and Jing Yanguang, but only by this point was he able to put the entire army under his control. None of the 15 military governors dared to disobey him. The people at the time were impressed by his fortitude and his strategies.

Further, it was said that Sang reacted to things quickly and made quick decisions that people often initially questioned, but then after deeper thought would understand his rationale and obey. However, it was said that he also made his decisions colored by his likes and dislikes, such that people who had helped him before would be repaid, and the people who had hurt him would be damaged, and that his reputation suffered as a result.

By 945, however, Shi Chonggui himself was suspicious of Sang, because his close associates Feng Yu (the brother of his wife Empress Feng) and Li Yantao (李彥韜) both disliked Sang and often accused Sang of misdeeds. Shi considered removing Sang from the chancellorship, but did not do so at the urging of fellow chancellors Li Song and Liu Xu. To try to divert the criticism, Sang requested that Feng Yu be made the deputy chief of staff, but the request only made Feng Yu more displeased. Shi eventually commissioned Feng Yu as a chief of staff as well, to divide Sang's responsibility.

Later in 945, there was an incident where Du Chongwei (whose name had been changed to Du Wei by this point to observe naming taboo for Shi Chonggui), who was then the military governor of Shunguo Circuit (順國, i.e., Chengde, the name of which was changed to Shunguo after the defeat of An Chongrong's rebellion), fearing a mutiny, left Shunguo against imperial orders and headed for Kaifeng, initially causing much apprehension in the capital. Sang advocated forcing Du into retirement in light of this incident, but Shi Chonggui, citing the fact that Du was an uncle, declined, and was much displeased at Sang for suggesting it. Indeed, at the request of Du's wife the Princess of Song (Shi's aunt), Shi then made Du the military governor of Tianxiong. It was said that Sang did not dare to make major policy suggestions after this point and requested retirement, citing a foot injury. However, it was also said that shortly thereafter, at Sang's suggestion, Shi sent the emissary Zhang Hui (張暉) to the Liao court, apologizing and requesting peaceful relations again. Emperor Taizong responded that he wanted to have Sang and Jing Yanguang sent to see him (under the rationale that it was Sang who initially negotiated the alliance, and that it was Jing who broke it) and that Shunguo and Yiwu (義武, headquartered in modern Baoding, Hebei) Circuits be ceded to Liao, and then a peace could be reentered. Shi found the demand insulting, and cut off further negotiations.

At one point in 945, Shi fell seriously ill. During that time, there happened to be an occasion where Sang had sent a maidservant to greet Shi Jingtang's wife Empress Dowager Li, and part of the greeting stated, "Has the Emperor's younger brother, Chongrui, been studying well?" Shi Chonggui heard of this and discussed this with Feng Yu, and Feng Yu thereafter accused Sang of considering deposing Shi Chonggui and replacing him with Shi Chongrui. As the imperial general Li Shouzhen also disliked Sang, he, Feng Yu, and Li Yantao thereafter suggested that Shi Chonggui remove Sang. Shi Chonggui agreed, and not long after, Sang was removed from his posts as chancellor and chief of staff, and made the mayor of Kaifeng. Zhao Ying, who was then the mayor of Kaifeng, was made chancellor, and Li Song was made chief of staff, to replace him. Thereafter, Sang, claiming his foot to be still injured, made very few attempts to see the emperor, and also did not see guests, to try to avoid suspicion. (When Feng Yu's associates tried to argue to him that being mayor of the capital, with many minute responsibilities, was an inappropriate post for someone with Sang's accomplishments and that he should be given a military governorship, Feng stated that he was fearful that Sang might rebel. When they pointed out that Sang was a civilian and could not rebel, Feng stated, "Even if he did not rebel himself, he might encourage someone else to do so," alluding to Sang's having encouraged Shi Jingtang to rebel.)

In 946, Emperor Taizong decided to create a trap for Later Jin. He spread false news that Zhao Yanshou was intending to defect to Later Jin, rumors that were believed by Feng and Li Song. They had Du Chongwei (whose name had been changed to Du Wei by that point due to naming taboo for Shi Chonggui's name), who was then the military governor of Tianxiong, write a secret letter to Zhao, to see if Zhao intended to defect. Zhao, who was part of Emperor Taizong's plan, wrote back and indicated that, indeed, he wanted to defect, along with his Lulong Circuit (盧龍, headquartered in Beijing — which had previously been Later Tang territory but which Shi Jingtang, as part of the agreement in which Emperor Taizong aided him to become emperor, ceded to Emperor Taizong); in his letter, he asked for a major Later Jin army to be launched to support his defection. After discussions between Shi Chonggui, Feng, and Li Song, it was agreed that a large army would be launched, commanded by Du, with Li Shouzhen serving as his deputy. (This was opposed by Zhao Ying, who believed that Du was untrustworthy due to his unthankful nature, but Zhao Ying was not listened to.)

Du's army was soon launched, but as it approached Liao territory, was met by a large, highly mobile Liao army commanded by Emperor Taizong himself. It tried to retreat, but became encircled by the Liao army at Zhongdu Bridge (中度橋, in modern Baoding, Hebei). After Emperor Taizong made a promise (which he would eventually repudiate) to have Du made emperor, Du and Li Shouzhen surrendered with their army. As virtually the entire Later Jin imperial army was under Du's command, Kaifeng was left defenseless, and the Liao army advanced quickly toward it. Even before the news reached Kaifeng, knowing the seriousness of the situation, Sang went to the palace to try to see Shi, but Shi, who was preparing a hunt at that point and not yet fully aware of the implications, refused to see him. When he went to see the chancellors, the chancellors believed that he was being overly alarmist. As he left, Sang lamented to his close associates, "The worship of the Jin ancestors is about to end." As the Liao army approached (with its forward corps commanded by the former Later Jin general Zhang Yanze), Shi Chonggui surrendered, ending Later Jin.

== Death ==
Emperor Taizong had stated, in his communications to Shi Chonggui accepting the surrender that he wanted to see Sang Weihan and Jing Yanguang. As Zhang Yanze approached Kaifeng, Sang's associates suggested that he flee. Sang's response is, "I am a prominent official. Where can I flee?" He remained at his headquarters and waited for orders. Zhang, thereafter, in the name of Shi Chonggui, summoned him. As Sang was walking toward Zhang's headquarters, he ran into Li Song on the road and began conversing with Li. While they were conversing, Zhang sent soldiers, who were respectful to Sang but nevertheless insisted on him heading to Zhang's headquarters. Sang, knowing what his fate would be, turned to Li and stated, "You, chancellor, were responsible for the state. Now the state is falling, but how is it that, instead, Sang Weihan would be dying for the state?" Li was ashamed and could not respond.

When Sang arrived at Zhang's headquarters, Zhang was initially arrogant toward him, sitting high in his seat. Sang rebuked him and stated, "Last year, it was I who promoted you from the ranks of the guilty [(Zhang had been accused of wrongly killing a staff member as well as misruling his circuit)]. You received a large circuit and a key command. How is it that you are turning against me like this?" Zhang could not respond, and put him under guard. Shortly after, Zhang killed Sang by strangulation, but put a belt around his neck and claimed to Emperor Taizong that Sang committed suicide. Emperor Taizong exclaimed, "I had no desire to kill Sang Weihan. How did this happen?" He ordered that Sang's family members be comforted. (The traditional histories Old History of the Five Dynasties and New History of the Five Dynasties attributed Zhang's actions to a request by Shi to Zhang, as Shi was apprehensive that if Emperor Taizong got to meet Sang, Sang would reveal the details behind Shi's turning against Liao, but Sima Guang, the lead author of the Zizhi Tongjian, found the account lacking in credibility as Zhang was acting arrogantly toward the Shi imperial household at the time such that he found it implausible that Zhang would follow any orders from Shi by that point, let alone killing Sang, and therefore concluded that Zhang killed Sang out of personal grudge.)

== Notes and references ==
- Old History of the Five Dynasties, vol. 89.
- New History of the Five Dynasties, vol. 29.
- Zizhi Tongjian, vols. 280, 281, 282, 283, 284, 285.
