= Empress Li (Later Jin) =

Empress Li (李皇后, personal name unknown; died October 7, 950) was a princess of the Chinese Five Dynasties and Ten Kingdoms Period state Later Tang (as a daughter of its emperor Li Siyuan) and an empress of the succeeding Later Jin (as the wife of its founding emperor Shi Jingtang).

== During Jin and Later Tang ==
It is not known when the future Empress Li was born. It is known that she was Li Siyuan's third daughter. Her mother was Li Siyuan's wife Lady Cao, who would later be empress during Li Siyuan's reign. It is not known exactly when she married Shi Jingtang, but as of 919, at which time her father Li Siyuan was still a general of Later Tang's predecessor state Jin and Shi was an officer under him, Shi was already referred to as a son-in-law of his, suggesting that they were married by that point. In 928, by which time Li Siyuan was emperor of Later Tang, he created Lady Li the Princess Yonging. In 933 (just before Li Siyuan's death), he created her the Princess of Wei. She and Shi Jingtang had at least one son, Shi Chongxin (石重信); it is not known whether any of his other five known sons or any daughter of his was born of her.

In 934, the princess's biological half-brother Li Conghou, then emperor, was facing the rebellion by their adoptive brother (Li Siyuan's adoptive son) Li Congke the Prince of Lu, who was advancing toward the capital Luoyang from his post as military governor of Fengxiang Circuit (鳳翔, headquartered in modern Baoji, Shaanxi). Shi, initially intending to support Li Conghou, launched his own troops from Hedong Circuit (河東, headquartered in modern Taiyuan, Shanxi) toward Luoyang. By the time he reached Luoyang's vicinity, however, Li Congke's army had already entered Luoyang, and Li Conghou had fled. Instead of supporting Li Conghou when he encountered Li Conghou, Shi slaughtered Li Conghou's guards, leaving him completely vulnerable. Li Congke subsequently had Li Conghou killed and took the throne.

Shi pledged loyalty to Li Congke. However, as they had previously not liked each other while both served under Li Siyuan, Li Congke's close associates advised him to keep Shi at Luoyang and not allow him to return to Hedong. The princess and her mother Empress Dowager Cao, however, pleaded on Shi's behalf, and Li Congke ultimately allowed him to return to Hedong. (Shi would later claim that Li Congke also made a promise that he would never move Shi away from Hedong during Shi's lifetime, although it is not clear whether Li Congke actually made such a promise.) In 935, Li Congke gave the princess the greater title of Grand Princess of Jin.

By 936, however, much mutual suspicion had developed between Li Congke and Shi, and Li Congke thought that Shi might rebel with the support of Later Tang's northern rival Khitan Empire. The suspicion was displayed in spring 936, when, at Li Congke's birthday, the princess had travelled from Hedong to celebrate at Luoyang, apparently to trying to alleviate those suspicions. After she offered Li Congke wine to wish him long life, she asked to take leave of him and return to Hedong's capital Taiyuan. Li Congke was already drunk, and he made the comment, "Why do you not stay longer? You wanted to return so quickly. Is it that you are about to rebel with Master Shi?" When she returned to Taiyuan and informed Shi, Shi became even more apprehensive. Later in the year, when Li Congke tried to transfer him from Hedong to Tianping Circuit (天平, headquartered in modern Tai'an, Shandong), he thus rebelled and sought aid from Khitan's Emperor Taizong. When Later Tang forces under the command of the general Zhang Jingda then put Taiyuan under siege, Emperor Taizong came to Shi's aid and crushed Zhang's army. Emperor Taizong then declared Shi the emperor of a new Later Jin, and subsequently, after the joint Khitan/Later Jin forces accepted the surrender of the Later Tang army (after Zhang's deputy Yang Guangyuan assassinated Zhang and offered to surrender) and headed toward Luoyang, Li Congke committed suicide with his family (including the princess's mother Empress Dowager Cao), ending Later Tang. Later Jin took over Later Tang's territory.

== During Later Jin ==
=== During Shi Jingtang's reign ===
At some point, it appeared that the princess was created empress by Shi Jingtang — although traditional histories differ as to timing or even whether it occurred. According to the Zizhi Tongjian, her creation was immediately upon his taking the throne as the emperor of Later Jin. According to the Wudai Huiyao, the creation did not occur until 941. According to the New History of the Five Dynasties, no formal creation ever occurred during Shi's lifetime. Her only known son Shi Chongxin (and another son of his, Shi Chong'ai (石重乂), who might or might not have been her son) were killed in 937 by the rebellious general Zhang Congbin (張從賓), whose rebellion was later suppressed.

Empress Li did have a surviving half-brother, Li Congyi. In 939, Shi Jingtang created Li Congyi the Duke of Xun, and had him be in charge of offering sacrifices to the emperors of the Later Tang and Tang dynasty. As Li Congyi was still young, Empress Li took to raising him herself, and she honored his mother Consort Dowager Wang (Li Siyuan's favorite concubine) as if the Consort Dowager were her own mother.

In 942, Shi fell ill. By that point, his only surviving son (of the seven known to history) was Shi Chongrui (石重睿). He entrusted Shi Chongrui to the senior chancellor Feng Dao, intending to have Feng support Shi Chongrui to succeed him. After he died shortly after, however, Feng and the general Jing Yanguang, believing that the state needed an older emperor, supported Shi Jingtang's adoptive son (and biological nephew, as the biological son of his older brother Shi Jingru (石敬儒)) Shi Chonggui the Prince of Qi as emperor. Shi Chonggui honored Empress Li as empress dowager, and his mother Lady An of Qin as consort dowager.

=== During Shi Chonggui's reign ===
It was said that Shi Chonggui served both Empress Dowager Li and Consort Dowager An diligently, often attending to them at their meals. However, he displeased her by marrying the widow of his uncle/brother Shi Chongyin (石重胤) (Shi Jingtang's biological brother and therefore Shi Chonggui's biological uncle, but whom Shi Jingtang adopted at his own son (as he did Shi Chonggui) and therefore was an adoptive brother), Lady Feng, as his wife and empress. Empress Feng became quite powerful in Shi Chonggui's administration, and Empress Dowager Li repeatedly tried to correct her, to no avail.

Shi Chonggui turned against Shi Jingtang's policy of being respectful to the Khitan (whose state Emperor Taizong had renamed Liao by this point); rather, he took a confrontational stance against Liao. In 946, Emperor Taizong, after trapping the major Later Jin general Du Wei and getting Du to surrender to him, advanced on then-capital Kaifeng. Shi Chonggui surrendered, ending Later Jin. As part of the surrender petition, Shi Chonggui referred to himself as "grandson" (as Shi Jingtang had honored Emperor Taizong as father), and Empress Dowager Li referred to herself as "daughter-in-law." However, apparently to spare them further humiliation (at that point), Emperor Taizong declined a formal, public surrender ceremony; he just entered Kaifeng and took over Later Jin's territory.

== After Later Jin's fall ==
In spring 947, Emperor Taizong created Shi Chonggui the Marquess of Fuyi (i.e., "the marquess who turned away from righteousness"), and prepared to relocate him and his family deep into Liao territory, to Huanglong (黃龍, in modern Changchun, Jilin). He informed Empress Dowager Li, "I heard that Shi Chonggui did not listen to you, his mother, and therefore fell to this state. You may decide what you wish to do. You need not go with him." She responded, "Shi Chonggui served me, your servant girl, carefully. His fault was that he violated the wishes of the late Emperor and ended the two states' friendliness. Now I have received your great grace that the entire family survives. Where could a mother go but to follow her son?"

Soon, Shi Chonggui, Empress Dowager Li, and the rest of the family were sent on their way, along with the key Later Jin officials Zhao Yin, Feng Yu (Empress Feng's brother), and Li Yantao (李彥韜). On the way, their train was poorly supplied, such that even Shi Chonggui and Empress Dowager Li sometimes lacked food.

Emperor Taizong himself soon withdrew from Kaifeng, but died on the way back to Liao proper, and was succeeded by his nephew Emperor Shizong. Around this time, Emperor Taizong's mother Grand Empress Dowager Shulü redirected Shi Chonggui's household, intending to settle them at Huaimi Prefecture (懷密州, said to be 1,500 li northwest of Huanglong). Soon thereafter, though, Grand Empress Dowager Shulü, who opposed Emperor Shizong's succession, was defeated by Emperor Shizong and removed from power herself. Emperor Shizong instead decided to resettle Shi Chonggui's household at Liaoyang (遼陽, in modern Liaoyang, Liaoning) and send them some supplies.

In 948, Emperor Shizong visited Liaoyang, on the way up the mountains for the summer. Shi Chonggui and his household went to pay homage to him. Emperor Shizong comforted Shi Chonggui, but, as Emperor Shizong was leaving Liaoyang, took 15 of Shi Chonggui's eunuchs and 15 of his attending officials, as well as his adoptive son Shi Yanxu (石延煦). When Emperor Shizong's brother-in-law Xiao Channu (蕭禪奴) indicated that he wanted Shi Chonggui's daughter but Shi Chonggui did not want to surrender her, Emperor Shizong seized her and gave her to Xiao. In the fall, as Emperor Shizong was returning to his capital Linhuang (臨潢, in modern Chifeng, Inner Mongolia), Empress Dowager Li decided to intercept him before he went back to Linhuang, and requested that he resettle their household near a Han city and give them land for agriculture. Emperor Shizong agreed, and sent her back to Chaoyang with Shi Yanxu. He later resettled them at Jian Prefecture (建州, in modern Chaoyang, Liaoning). The military governor at Jian Prefecture, Zhao Yanhui (趙延暉), yielded his headquarters for them to live in. Shi Chonggui had his followers until the land and establish an agricultural settlement.

Empress Dowager Li fell ill in 950. There was no physician or medication available at Jian Prefecture, and her conditions grew worse. As she fell extremely ill, she held Shi Chonggui's hands and cursed Du Wei and Du's deputy Li Shouzhen, stating, "Even after I die I will not spare you!" She was unaware that both Du and Li Shouzhen had been killed. She died shortly after. Her wishes were that her body be burned and the ashes be delivered to You Prefecture (幽州, in modern Beijing) to be housed at a Buddhist temple — as You, while a Liao possession by that point, traditionally was considered Chinese soil. However, for reasons unknown, although Shi did burn her body, he buried her ashes right at Jian Prefecture and did not try to deliver them to You.

== Notes and references ==
- Old History of the Five Dynasties, vol. 86.
- New History of the Five Dynasties, vol. 17.
- Zizhi Tongjian, vols. 278, 279, 280, 282, 283, 285, 286, 288, 289.

Preceded by None (dynasty founded)	Empress of Later Jin; 936–942	Succeeded by Empress Feng
Preceded by Empress Liu of Later Tang	Empress of China (Shanxi); 936–942	Succeeded by Empress Feng
Preceded by Empress Liu of Later Tang	Empress of China (Central); 937–942	Succeeded by Empress Feng
