= Shi Chonggui =

Emperor of Later Jin from 942 to 947

Emperor Chu of Later Jin 後晉出帝

Emperor of the Later Jin dynasty
- Reign: July 28, 942 – January 11, 947
- Predecessor: Shi Jingtang
- Successor: Dynasty destroyed Emperor Taizong of Liao as the emperor of central China
- Born: July 22, 914 天祐十一年六月二十七日; Taiyuan, Tang dynasty
- Died: July 10, 974 (aged 59) 保寧六年六月十八日
- Burial: November 27, 974 保寧六年閏十月十一日; Anjincheng (安晉城), Jianzhou, Liao dynasty (in modern Chaoyang, Liaoning)
- Spouses: Wives: Lady Zhang; Empress Feng (m. 942); Major concubines: Consort Zhao; Consort Nie
- Issue: Shi Yanxu (石延煦), adoptive son Shi Yanbao (石延寶), adoptive son
Names
- Shi Chonggui (石重貴)
Era dates
- Tiānfú (天福) (inherited from Shi Jingtang) (942–944); Kāiyùn (開運) (944–946)
Posthumous name
- Emperor Chu (出皇帝)
Temple name
- None
- House: Shi
- Dynasty: Later Jin
- Father: Shi Jingru (石敬儒) (biological father); Shi Jingtang (adoptive father, biological uncle)
- Mother: Lady An (biological mother); Empress Li (adoptive mother, aunt by marriage)

Shi Chonggui (Chinese: 石重貴) (914 – 10 July 974), known in traditional Chinese historical sources as Emperor Chu of Later Jin (後晉出帝, "the exiled emperor") or Emperor Shao of Later Jin (後晉少帝, "the young emperor"), posthumously known in the Liao dynasty as the Prince of Jin (晉王), was the second and last emperor of China's Later Jin dynasty during the Five Dynasties and Ten Kingdoms period.

The Later Jin dynasty had often been characterized as a puppet state of the emerging Khitan-led Liao dynasty. The help of their powerful northern neighbors was vital in the formation of the Later Jin, and the cession of the Sixteen Prefectures led to their derision as being the servants of the Liao dynasty. However, after the death of his biological uncle/adoptive father Shi Jingtang (Later Jin's founding emperor) in 942, Shi Chonggui defied Liao's Emperor Taizong, which led to the latter invading the territory of the Later Jin in 946 and 947, resulting in the destruction of the Later Jin.

== Background ==
Shi Chonggui was born in 914, at the Fenyang Neighborhood (汾陽里) of Taiyuan, during the rule of Li Cunxu the Prince of Jin. His father was Shi Jingru (石敬儒), and his mother was Lady An, likely Shi Jingru's wife. Shi Jingru served as a cavalry officer under Li Cunxu, but died early, so Shi Jingru's brother Shi Jingtang, a son-in-law of Li Cunxu's adoptive brother and major general Li Siyuan, adopted Shi Chonggui as a son. During later times when Shi Jingtang served as a military governor (Jiedushi) of a number of circuits during the time of Jin's successor state Later Tang, Shi Jingtang took him to the various circuits and gave him responsibilities. It was said that his appearance was similar to Shi Jingtang, but he was shorter in stature. Other than Shi Chonggui, Shi Jingtang had six other sons, five of whom were biological.

After Shi Jingtang received the command of Hedong Circuit (河東, headquartered at Taiyuan) in 932, late in the reign of Li Siyuan as Later Tang's emperor, he had one Wang Zhen (王震) teach Shi Chonggui about the Book of Rites, but Shi Chonggui was unable to understand it, stating to Wang, "This is not relevant to my family's business." While Shi Jingtang held the Hedong command, he had Shi Chonggui marry the oldest daughter of the general Zhang Congxun (張從訓). (Lady Zhang would die sometime before Shi Chonggui eventually became emperor, but it is not otherwise clear when.)

In 936, Shi Jingtang rose in rebellion against then-Later Tang emperor Li Congke (Li Siyuan's adoptive son and Shi Jingtang's brother-in-law). As a result, a number of Shi Jingtang's relatives, including two sons, were executed by Li Congke. (The two sons were recorded in the New History of the Five Dynasties as Shi Chongying (石重英) and Shi Chongyin (石重胤), and in the Zizhi Tongjian as Shi Chongyin (石重殷) and Shi Chongyi (石重裔).) During the subsequent siege of Taiyuan by the Later Tang general Zhang Jingda, Shi Chonggui personally helped to guard Shi Jingtang. Subsequently, a relief army from Khitan Empire's Emperor Taizong came to Shi Jingtang's aid and crushed Zhang's army, allowing the siege on Taiyuan to be lifted. Emperor Taizong subsequently declared Shi Jingtang to be the emperor of central China (as the founder of a new state of Later Jin).

== During Shi Jingtang's reign ==
Shortly after Shi Jingtang's being proclaimed emperor, the Later Tang army, trapped by the Khitan/Later Jin forces, surrendered after Zhang Jingda's deputy Yang Guangyuan assassinated Zhang. Emperor Taizong and Shi Jingtang prepared to advance south, toward the Later Tang capital Luoyang. Shi Jingtang was prepared to leave one son at Taiyuan to serve as the titular defender, and he called out all of his sons for Emperor Taizong to choose. Emperor Taizong chose Shi Chonggui, stating, "This large-eyed child can be it." Shi Jingtang thereafter left Shi Chonggui in charge at Taiyuan, giving him the titles of defender of the northern capital (i.e., Taiyuan), mayor of Taiyuan, and military governor of Hedong. Subsequently, as the joint Khitan/Later Jin forces approached Luoyang, Li Congke, finding the situation hopeless, committed suicide with his family, ending Later Tang. Shi Jingtang then entered Luoyang unopposed. Still, the realm was not calmed, and in one of the rebellions against Shi Jingtang in 937, the general Zhang Congbin (張從賓) killed two more sons of Shi Jingtang's, Shi Chongxin (石重信) and Shi Chong'ai (石重乂). As another son of Shi Jingtang's, Shi Chonggao (石重杲), had died in childhood, all that were left of Shi Jingtang's sons at this point, other than Shi Chonggui, was Shi Chongrui (石重睿). Later in 937, Shi Jingtang summoned Shi Chonggui to then-capital Kaifeng, and made him an imperial guard general. In 938, he made Shi Chonggui the mayor of Kaifeng and created him the Prince of Zheng.

In late 941, Shi Jingtang, in anticipation of a possible rebellion by An Chongrong the military governor of Chengde Circuit (成德, headquartered in modern Shijiazhuang, Hebei), decided to head to Yedu (鄴都, in modern Handan, Hebei), so that he could better coordinate the operations against An Chongrong if the rebellion occurred. He left Shi Chonggui in charge of Kaifeng as its defender. However, he was also apprehensive that An Congjin the military governor of Shannan East Circuit (山南東道, headquartered in modern Xiangyang, Hubei), would rebel as well. At the advice of the chancellor He Ning, Shi Jingtang left a number of signed, blank edicts, so that Shi Chonggui could react quickly if An Congjin did rebel. When An Congjin did rebel after Shi Jingtang left Kaifeng, Shi Chonggui was thus able to commission the necessary generals, with Gao Xingzhou in overall command, to attack An Congjin. Shortly after, Shi Jingtang summoned Shi Chonggui to Yedu and made the defender of Yedu, Li Dechong (李德珫), the defender of Kaifeng. After Shi Chonggui arrived at Yedu, Shi Jingtang made him the defender of Yedu and changed his princely title to Prince of Qi. Both An Chongrong and An Congjin were subsequently defeated; An Chongrong was killed by his subordinates, while An Congjin committed suicide.

In summer 942, Shi Jingtang fell seriously ill. He summoned the senior chancellor Feng Dao, and then had Shi Chongrui come out to bow to Feng, and then put Shi Chongrui into Feng's lap, intending to show that he wanted Shi Chongrui to inherit the throne with Feng guiding the young emperor. However, after Shi Jingtang subsequently died, Feng, in consultation with the imperial guard general Jing Yanguang, concluded that as the realm was not calm yet, an older emperor was needed, so they supported Shi Chonggui, who then took the throne.

== Reign ==
Shi Chonggui honored his adoptive mother Empress Li as empress dowager, and his biological mother Lady An as consort dowager. It was said that he served both of them with filial piety. However, he displeased Empress Dowager Li when he, even while observing a mourning period for Shi Jingtang, married his deceased biological uncle/adoptive brother Shi Chongyin (石重胤)'s widow, Lady Feng, as his wife. He subsequently created Lady Feng empress.

As Jing Yanguang was considered instrumental in Shi Chonggui's ascending to the throne, Jing, who was made a chancellor, became highly influential early in his administration. Under Jing's advocacy, Shi Chonggui abandoned Shi Jingtang's respectful subservience to the Khitan (whose state had since been renamed Liao) and took a more defiant stance. As an initial sign of that defiance, Shi Chonggui's did not submit a report to Emperor Taizong of his succession, but instead wrote a letter (indicating equal status and not subservience) in which he referred to himself as "grandson" (as Shi Jingtang had earlier honored Emperor Taizong as "father") but not as "your subject." This angered Emperor Taizong, who sent emissaries to rebuke Shi Chonggui, but to whom Jing responded insolently. The major Khitan general Zhao Yanshou, who had previously been a major Later Tang general and who wanted to replace the Later Jin emperor as the emperor of the Central Plains, thus advocated to Emperor Taizong that he consider a campaign against Later Jin. The situation was further aggravated when Jing persuaded Shi Chonggui to arrest the Liao trade liaison Qiao Rong (喬榮), execute Khitan merchants, and confiscate their properties, causing Emperor Taizong to be resolved to act against Later Jin.

In early 944, Emperor Taizong led a major invasion into Later Jin territory, and quickly reached Yedu. When Shi sent emissaries to the Liao camp to try to sue for peace, Emperor Taizong rejected the overture. Yang Guangyuan, then the military governor of Pinglu Circuit (平盧, headquartered in modern Weifang, Shandong), subsequently rebelled in coordination with Liao. Shi commissioned a number of generals to resist the Liao attack, and himself also commanded troops, and, when the generals Gao Xingzhou, Fu Yanqing, and Shi Gongba (石公霸) were put under siege by Liao troops at Qicheng (戚城, in modern Puyang, Henan) and Jing, overseeing the operations against Liao, refused to launch a relief army, it was Shi Chonggui himself who led his army to the three generals' rescue. Because of the other generals' hatred of Jing's control of authority, Shi Chonggui used this incident as an opportunity to remove him from his chancellorship, and the senior official Sang Weihan was put in charge of the army overall operations, as his chief of staff (Shumishi). After the Liao forces were repelled and withdrew, Shi Chonggui sent the general Li Shouzhen against Yang, and subsequently, faced with certain defeat but with Yang unwilling to surrender, Yang's son Yang Chengxun (楊承勳) forcibly put Yang Guangyuan under arrest and surrendered. (Yang Guangyuan was subsequently secretly killed on Shi Chonggui's orders.)

In late 944, Liao again made a major invasion, advancing all the way to the Yedu region, but soon withdrew again. Shi decided to have his uncle by marriage, Du Wei (husband of Shi Jingtang's and Shi Jingru's sister), then the military governor of Shunguo Circuit (順國, i.e., formerly Chengde), lead a punitive counterattack, with Li Shouzhen as Du's deputy. They crossed into Liao territory and captured Qi (祁州) and Tai (泰州) (both in modern Baoding), but soon received news that the Liao army had turned around and was heading for them. They tried to withdraw, but became surrounded near Yangcheng (陽城, in modern Baoding). Du panicked and was reluctant to engage the Liao army, but at Fu's advocacy, Fu, Zhang Yanze, Yao Yuanfu (藥元福), and Huangfu Yu (皇甫遇), attacked the Liao army fiercely, causing the Liao army to panic and flee.

Later in 945, there was an incident where Du, fearing a mutiny, left Shunguo against imperial orders and headed for Kaifeng, initially causing much apprehension in the capital. Sang advocated forcing Du into retirement in light of this incident, but Shi Chonggui, citing the fact that Du was an uncle, declined, and was much displeased at Sang for suggesting it. Indeed, at the request of Du's wife the Princess of Song (Shi's aunt), Shi then made Du the military governor of Tianxiong (天雄, headquartered at Yedu). It was said that Sang did not dare to make major policy suggestions after this point and requested retirement, citing a foot injury. However, it was also said that shortly thereafter, at Sang's suggestion, Shi sent the emissary Zhang Hui (張暉) to the Liao court, apologizing and requesting peaceful relations again. Emperor Taizong responded that he wanted to have Sang and Jing Yanguang sent to see him (under the rationale that it was Sang who initially negotiated the alliance, and that it was Jing who broke it) and that Shunguo and Yiwu (義武, headquartered in modern Baoding, Hebei) Circuits be ceded to Liao, and then a peace could be reentered. Shi found the demand insulting, and cut off further negotiations. Believing that the victory at Yangcheng affirmed his empire's military strength, he became increasingly arrogant and extravagant in collecting expensive items and building palace halls, as well as awarding his favored opera performers, despite Sang's attempts to discourage him.

At one point in 945, Shi fell seriously ill. During that time, there happened to be an occasion where Sang had sent a maidservant to greet Shi Jingtang's wife Empress Dowager Li, and part of the greeting stated, "Has the Emperor's younger brother, Chongrui, been studying well?" Shi Chonggui heard of this and discussed this with Empress Feng's brother Feng Yu (who was also a chief of staff), and Feng Yu thereafter accused Sang of considering deposing Shi Chonggui and replacing him with Shi Chongrui. As Li Shouzhen also disliked Sang, he, Feng Yu, and Li Yantao (李彥韜) thereafter suggested that Shi Chonggui remove Sang. Shi Chonggui agreed, and not long after, Sang was removed from his posts as chancellor and chief of staff, and made the mayor of Kaifeng. Zhao Ying, who was then the mayor of Kaifeng, was made chancellor, and Li Song was made chief of staff, to replace him.

In 946, there were rumors that Zhao Yanshou was planning on defecting to Later Jin. This rumor was believed by Li Song and Feng. They had Du write a letter to Zhao, encouraging him to do so, with the officer Zhao Xingshi (趙行實), who had previously served under Zhao Yanshou, delivering the letter. Zhao Yanshou wrote back (to try to lead Later Jin forces into a trap), stating, "I have long been in a foreign land, and I want to return to China. Please launch a major army to support me, so that I can pull myself out and return with it." Subsequently, under Emperor Taizong's orders, Liao's prefect of Ying Prefecture (瀛州, in modern Cangzhou, Hebei), Liu Yanzuo (劉延祚), also offered to defect to Later Jin. Shi thus put Du and Li Shouzhen in command of an army to attack north, with the stated objectives being to first recapture the prefectures Shi Jingtang previously ceded to Liao (the Sixteen Prefectures), and then to destroy Liao. (Zhao Ying, however, had reservations, pointing out that Du, despite his honored position, was still often dissatisfied with his station, and therefore suggested to Li Song and Feng that Li Shouzhen be put in command by himself; Zhao Ying's suggestions were not listened to, however.) When Du and Li Shouzhen advanced, though, they were met by a large army that Emperor Taizong personally commanded. The Liao army eventually surrounded the Later Jin army at Zhongdu Bridge (中度橋, in modern Baoding). After Emperor Taizong made the promise to Du to make him emperor if he surrendered, Du and Li Shouzhen surrendered their army. Emperor Taizong then prepared to advance south. With virtually the entire Later Jin army having been given to Du and Li Shouzhen for this northern campaign, Kaifeng was left essentially defenseless, and Shi Chonggui, after initially considering suicide by fire but was stopped by the general Xue Chao (薛超), felt compelled to surrender, ending Later Jin. Emperor Taizong subsequently entered Daliang. Shi's surrender petition, as drafted by the imperial scholar Fan Zhi, stated:

Your grandson and your subject, Chonggui, had his spirit deluded into disaster, and his state's fortune has been ended by heaven. Now, he shall, along with the Empress Dowager and his wife Lady Feng, gather his family and take them to the fields, bind himself, and wait for your judgment. He is sending his sons Yanxu the military governor of Zhenning [(鎮寧, headquartered in modern Puyang)] and Yanbao the military governor of Weixin [(威信, headquartered in modern Nanyang, Henan)], to present, in surrender, one imperial seal, and three golden seals.

== After surrender to Liao ==
Emperor Taizong created Shi Chonggui the Marquess of Fuyi (負義侯, i.e., "the marquess who turned against righteousness"), and prepared to have him and his family exiled deep into Liao territory, to Huanglong (黃龍, in modern Changchun, Jilin). (He offered Empress Dowager Li the choice of not going into exile with Shi Chonggui, but she declined, pointing out that he was filially pious to her, and that as his adoptive mother, she should accompany him.) The group included him, Empress Dowager Li, Consort Dowager An, Empress Feng, Shi Chongrui, Shi Yanxu, and Shi Yanbao. It was said that on the way, his train was poorly supplied, and sometimes even he and Empress Dowager Li would run out of food. The only Later Jin regional governor who dared to meet him on the way was Li Gu the prefect of Ci Prefecture (磁州, in modern Handan) and provide him with whatever Li Gu himself had on hand. When he reached Zhongdu Bridge and saw the remnants of camps that Du Wei had left, he bitterly wept and stated, "O Heaven! What has my clan done to him, that this bandit destroyed it!"

Once Shi Chonggui's train entered into Liao proper, they received no further supplies from the Liao army escorting them, such that their attendants and ladies in waiting had to forage fruits and leaves for food. When they reached Jin Prefecture (錦州, in modern Jinzhou, Liaoning), they were forced to bow at the tomb of Emperor Taizong's father Emperor Taizu. Shi Chonggui was so humiliated that he stated in tears, "Xue Chao ruined me!" Empress Feng tried to obtain poison so that they could commit suicide together, but was unable to.

However, after Emperor Taizong's death shortly after and succession by his nephew Emperor Shizong, Shi Chonggui's fortune changed somewhat, as, after Emperor Shizong then defeated his grandmother (Emperor Taizu's wife) Empress Dowager Shulü, who opposed his claim to the throne, Emperor Shizong had Shi's train redirected to Liaoyang (遼陽, in modern Liaoyang, Liaoning) to be settled there. When Shi then submitted a petition to him to congratulate him on his victory, his household again began to be supplied again.

In 948, Emperor Shizong visited Liaoyang, on the way up the mountains for the summer. Shi Chonggui and his household went to pay homage to him. Emperor Shizong comforted Shi Chonggui, but, as Emperor Shizong was leaving Liaoyang, took 15 of Shi Chonggui's eunuchs and 15 of his attending officials, as well as his adoptive son Shi Yanxu (石延煦). When Emperor Shizong's brother-in-law Xiao Channu (蕭禪奴) indicated that he wanted Shi Chonggui's daughter but Shi Chonggui did not want to surrender her, Emperor Shizong seized her and gave her to Xiao. In the fall, as Emperor Shizong was returning to his capital Linhuang (臨潢, in modern Chifeng, Inner Mongolia), Empress Dowager Li decided to intercept him before he went back to Linhuang, and requested that he resettle their household near a Han city and give them land for agriculture. Emperor Shizong agreed, and sent her back to Chaoyang with Shi Yanxu. He later resettled them at Jian Prefecture (建州, in modern Chaoyang, Liaoning). (Consort Dowager An died on the way from Chaoyang to Jian Prefecture.) The military governor at Jian Prefecture, Zhao Yanhui (趙延暉), yielded his headquarters for them to live in. Shi Chonggui had his followers till the land and establish an agricultural settlement. Soon thereafter, though, Emperor Shizong's cousin Yelü Jing seized Shi Chonggui's favorite concubines Consorts Zhao and Nie and made them his own.

Empress Dowager Li fell ill in 950. There was no physician or medication available at Jian Prefecture, and her conditions grew worse. As she fell extremely ill, she held Shi Chonggui's hands and cursed Du Wei and Du's deputy Li Shouzhen, stating, "Even after I die I will not spare you!" She died shortly after. That was last traditional Chinese historical reference to Shi Chonggui, other than a reference that during Later Zhou's Xiande era (954-962), there were people coming from Liao lands who reported that Shi and Empress Feng were still living in fairly good condition, but that over half of his attendants had escaped or died.

The only things known about the remainder of Shi Chonggui's life came from the discoveries of the tombstones of himself and of Shi Yanxu, which were received by the Chaoyang City Museum in 2000 and 1998 respectively. According to his tombstone, he died in 974, during the reign of Emperor Muzong's successor (Emperor Shizong's son) Emperor Jingzong. The tombstone mentioned that he was buried with Empress Feng, implying that she was no longer alive at the time of his death. Apparently, by the time of his death, he was much honored by the Liao court, with the title of Prince of Jin, and there was official mourning held for him at the court at the time of his death.

== Family ==
- Biological father
  - Shi Jingru (石敬儒)
- Biological mother
  - Lady An (honored as Consort Dowager 943)
- Adoptive father
  - Shi Jingtang, biological uncle
- Adoptive mother
  - Empress Li
- Wives
  - Lady Zhang, posthumously honored empress 943
  - Empress Feng (married 942, created 943)
- Major Concubines
  - Consort Zhao
  - Consort Nie
- Children
  - One daughter
  - Shi Yanxu (石延煦), adoptive son, biological grandson of Shi Jingtang's
  - Shi Yanbao (石延寶), adoptive son, biological grandson of Shi Jingtang's

== Notes and references ==
- Old History of the Five Dynasties, vols. 81, 82, 83, 84, 85.
- New History of the Five Dynasties, vol. 9.
- Zizhi Tongjian, vols. 280, 281, 282, 283, 284, 285, 286, 288, 289.

Shi Chonggui House of Shi (936–947) Born: 914 Died: 974
Regnal titles
Preceded by Shi Jingtang (Emperor Gaozu)	Emperor of Later Jin; 942–947	Succeeded by None (dynasty destroyed)
Preceded by Shi Jingtang (Emperor Gaozu)	Emperor of China (Tianshui region); 942–947	Succeeded by Meng Chang of Later Shu
Preceded by Shi Jingtang (Emperor Gaozu)	Emperor of China (Central); 942–947	Succeeded by Emperor Taizong of Liao
Preceded by Zhuo Yanming	Sovereign of China (Northeastern Fujian) (de jure); 945–947; With: Li Jing of Southern Tang 945–946; Qian Hongzuo of Wuyue 946–947	Succeeded by Qian Hongzuo of Wuyue
