= Li Shouzhen =

Chinese general and rebel (died 949)

- Traditional Chinese: 李守貞
- Simplified Chinese: 李守贞
Transcriptions
Standard Mandarin
- Hanyu Pinyin: Lǐ Shǒuzhēn
- Wade–Giles: Li^{3} Shou^{3}-chen^{1}
- IPA: [lì ʂòʊʈʂə́n]

Li Shouzhen (李守貞; died 17 August 949) was a Chinese military general, monarch, and politician of the Chinese Five Dynasties and Ten Kingdoms Period states Later Jin and Later Han, as well as (briefly) the Khitan Liao dynasty. During the reign of Later Han's second emperor Liu Chengyou, he became concerned that he was being targeted by the officials assisting the young emperor, and therefore rebelled. His rebellion was defeated by the Later Han general Guo Wei, however, and he committed suicide.

== Background ==
It is not known when Li Shouzhen was born. It is known that he was from Heyang (河陽, in modern Jiaozuo, Henan). He was said to be intelligent and strong in character in but poor in his youth. He became an officer at Heyang Circuit (headquartered at Heyang). When Shi Jingtang served as the military governor (Jiedushi) of Heyang under his father-in-law, the Later Tang emperor Li Siyuan, he made Li his protocol officer. Thereafter, when Shi was moved to several other circuits, Li followed him and continued to serve under him.

== During Later Jin ==
=== During Shi Jingtang's reign ===
After Shi Jingtang overthrew then-Later Tang emperor Li Congke (Li Siouan's adoptive son) in 936 and established his state of Later Jin, he made Li Shouzhen his imperial protocol officer (客省使, Keshengshi). In 940, when Li Jinquan the military governor (Jiedushi) of Anyuan Circuit (安遠, headquartered in modern Xiaogan, Hubei) rebelled against Shi's rule, Shi sent the general Ma Quanjie (馬全節) to attack Li Jinquan. Li Shouzhen served as Ma's army monitor during the campaign, and after Li Jinquan fled to Later Jin's southeastern neighbor Southern Tang and Later Jin retained Anyuan, Li Shouzhen was promoted to be the director palace affairs (宣徽使, Xunahuishi).

=== During Shi Chonggui's reign ===
After Shi Jingtang died in 942 and was succeeded by his nephew Shi Chonggui, Li Shouzhen was given the dual offices of commander of the imperial cavalry guards and military governor of Yicheng Circuit (義成, headquartered in modern Anyang, Henan). His imperial guard office was soon changed to be discipline officer of the imperial guards.

In 944, the Khitan Liao dynasty's Emperor Taizong—whose support had been instrumental in Shi Jingtang's establishment of Later Jin but whose relationship with Shi Chonggui had become inimical—invaded Later Jin. Li Shouzhen was one of the Later Jin generals sent to resist the invasion. When the Liao general Yelü Mada (耶律麻荅) tried to attack Shi Chonggui himself directly during the campaign, Li Shouzhen intercepted and defeated him. After the end of that campaign, Shi, while retaining him as discipline officer, also made him the military governor of Taining Circuit (泰寧, headquartered in modern Jining, Shandong).

Subsequently, when the major general Yang Guangyuan the military governor of Pinglu Circuit (平盧, headquartered in modern Weifang, Shandong) rebelled with Liao support, Shi sent Li to attack Yang. (The reason why Shi sent Li was because Li and Yang had prior grudges against each other.) Around the new year 945, Yang Guangyuan's son Yang Chengxun (楊承勳) put his father under house arrest and surrendered to Li. With Yang Chengxun's having surrendered on his own, Shi, while believing that Yang Guangyuan deserved death, did not want to execute him publicly, and therefore had Li secretly send executioners to batter Yang to death, while publicly claiming that Yang had died of an illness. Yang's treasury officer Song Yan (宋顏), who had encouraged Yang's rebellion and therefore was decreed to be executed, submitted Yang's treasures, beautiful concubines, and best horses to Li, hoping to be spared. Li thus hid him from the imperial officials. However, the chancellor Sang Weihan, receiving reports that Li had sheltered Song, sent officers to search Li's camp and, upon locating Song, executed him, causing Li to resent Sang. Li also drew resentment from his own soldiers by awarding them for the victory with items that they did not appreciate—such as fermented tea, dyed wood, ginger, and herbs. The soldiers receiving such "rewards" often tied them up in bundles and hanged them on trees, calling them, "Shouzhen's heads". Nevertheless, upon Li's return to the capital Kaifeng after the victory, he was greatly honored by being given the honorary chancellor designation Tong Zhongshu Menxia Pingzhangshi (同中書門下平章事) and the grand mansion that Yang had at Kaifeng—which Li then expanded into an even grander structure, said to be the largest mansion for officials at Kaifeng. Shi held feasts in his honor and gave him rewards beyond all others.

In late 944, Emperor Taizong launched another major incursion into Later Jin territory, inflicting much damage on the Later Jin populace north of the Yellow River. As the Liao army withdrew in spring 945, Shi sent Du Wei (Shi Jingtang's sister's husband, and therefore, Shi Chonggui's uncle by marriage) and Li Shouzhen in command of an army to give chase. They crossed into Liao territory and captured Qi (祁州) and Tai (泰州) (both in modern Baoding), but soon received news that the Liao army had turned around and was heading for them. They tried to withdraw, but became surrounded near Yangcheng (陽城, in modern Baoding). Du panicked and was reluctant to engage the Liao army, but at Fu Yanqing's advocacy, Li Shouzhen ordered an attack during a sandstorm (which hid the Later Jin numerical disadvantage); Fu, Zhang Yanze, Yao Yuanfu (藥元福), and Huangfu Yu (皇甫遇), attacked the Liao army fiercely, causing the Liao army to panic and flee. After his return from this campaign, Li's military governorship was moved to Guide Circuit (歸德, headquartered in modern Shangqiu, Henan). In late 945, Shi stationed Li Shouzhen and his army at Chan Prefecture (澶州, in modern Puyang, Henan), to defend against another potential Liao attack. Meanwhile, still resentful of Sang, Li Shouzhen, along with Shi's close associates Feng Yu (the brother of Shi's wife Empress Feng) and Li Yantao (李彥韜), falsely accused Sang of plotting to have Shi replaced with Shi Jingtang's son Shi Chongrui (石重睿). Sang was removed from his dual roles as chancellor and chief of staff (Shumishi) and replaced by Zhao Ying and Li Song. Around this time, his military governorship was moved from Guide to Tainting (天平, headquartered in modern Tai'an, Shandong).

In 946, there was a report from Ding Prefecture (定州, in modern Baoding, Hebei) that another Liao attack was impending. Shi Chonggui sent Li to the frontier to command an army against the potential invasion, with Huangfu Yu (皇甫遇) serving as his deputy. However, with the report apparently being a false alarm, Li, after minor border skirmishes, was returned to his position at Chan. (It was said that at this time, Li Yantao had become particularly powerful as Shi's close associate, such that he had Li Shouzhen's every move under control. Li Shouzhen, in response, outwardly showed respect and deference to him, while inwardly resented his influence on the emperor.) Meanwhile, with Li Shouzhen's troops having to often go through Guangjin (廣晉, in modern Handan, Hebei), Du, who was then the military governor of Tianxiong Circuit (天雄, headquartered at Guangjin), frequently got the chance to welcome him and often gifted him with gold, silk, armors, and elite soldiers, causing them to become good friends. Whenever Shi held feasts for Li Shouzhen and praised him for battlefield accomplishments, Li Shouzhen would thus praise Du for his contributions and suggest that, in the future, if there were to be a major attack against Liao, he and Du could work together, and Shi agreed.

In 946, there were rumors that the major Liao general Zhao Yanshou—who had previously been a major Later Tang general before being captured by the Khitan in the campaign that led to Later Tang's destruction—was planning on defecting to Later Jin. This rumor was believed by Li Song and Feng, who then served as Shi's chief of staff. They had Du write a letter to Zhao, encouraging him to do so, with the officer Zhao Xingshi (趙行實), who had previously served under Zhao Yanshou, delivering the letter. Zhao Yanshou wrote back (to try to lead Later Jin forces into a trap), stating, "I have long been in a foreign land, and I want to return to China. Please launch a major army to support me, so that I can pull myself out and return with it." Subsequently, under Emperor Taizong's orders, Liao's prefect of Ying Prefecture (瀛州, in modern Cangzhou), Liu Yanzuo (劉延祚), also offered to defect to Later Jin. Shi thus put Du and Li Shouzhen in command of an army to attack north, with the stated objectives being to first recapture the prefectures Shi Jingtang previously ceded to Liao (the Sixteen Prefectures), and then to destroy Liao. (Zhao Ying, however, had reservations, pointing out that Du, despite his honored position, was still often dissatisfied with his station, and therefore suggested to Li Song and Feng that Li Shouzhen be put in command by himself; Zhao Ying's suggestions were not listened to, however.) When Du and Li Shouzhen advanced, though, they were met by a large army that Emperor Taizong personally commanded. The Liao army eventually surrounded the Later Jin army at Zhongdu Bridge (中度橋, in modern Baoding). After Emperor Taizong made the promise to Du to make him emperor if he surrendered, Du and Li Shouzhen surrendered their army. (As part of accepting Du's surrender, Emperor Taizong had Zhao mockingly put an imperial robe on Du.) Emperor Taizong then prepared to advance south. He commissioned Li Shouzhen 'Situ (司徒, one of the Three Excellencies) as well as continuing to the military governor of Tianping, and had Li Shouzhen and Du accompany him south. With virtually the entire Later Jin army having been given to Du and Li Shouzhen for this northern campaign, Kaifeng was left essentially defenseless, and Shi felt compelled to surrender, ending Later Jin. Emperor Taizong subsequently entered Daliang.

== During submission to Liao ==
Upon entering Kaifeng, Emperor Taizong announced that, in addition to being the emperor of the Khitan, he was now also the emperor of the Chinese. He was, however, soon running into Han Chinese resistance as he allowed the Khitan soldiers to pillage the countryside. As part of a countermeasure, he began to send some former-Later Jin military governors, who had gathered at Kaifeng to show allegiance to him and whom he then kept at Kaifeng (thus causing their circuits' rebellions to go unchecked) back to their circuits—including Li Shouzhen and Du Chongwei (i.e., Du Wei, whose name had been changed as part of naming taboo for Shi Chonggui, but who now changed back to Chongwei with Later Jin's having fallen). (During the time that Li Shouzhen was kept at Kaifeng, the people of Kaifeng, whenever they saw him and Du out in public, would curse them; neither of them showed any sign of shamefulness.)

== During Later Han ==
Later in the year, the formerly Later Jin-commissioned military governor of Hedong Circuit (河東, headquartered in modern Taiyuan, Shanxi), claimed imperial title, establishing a new state of Later Han. With Liao's Emperor Taizong having become tired of Chinese resistance and deciding to withdraw back to Liao proper (and dying on the way), the remaining power vacuum allowed Liu to arrive at Kaifeng quickly and gradually take over the vacated former Later Jin territory. In or around summer 947, Li Shouzhen submitted a petition to him, formally submitting as a Later Han subject. Liu thereafter moved him to be the military governor of Huguo Circuit (護國, headquartered in modern Yuncheng, Shanxi) and gave him the honorary chancellor title Zhongshu Ling (中書令).

In 948, Liu Zhiyuan died and was succeeded by his son Liu Chengyou. Pursuant to instructions that Liu Zhiyuan left, a group of high-level officials and generals (Su Fengji, Yang Bin, Shi Hongzhao, and Guo Wei) were entrusted with the responsibilities of the imperial government. Liu Zhiyuan also left instructions to "defend against Du Chongwei", which these officials interpreted as an order to execute Du, and which they then carried out after Liu Zhiyuan's death. As Li was friendly with Du, and they had together surrendered to Liao previously, Li feared that he would be next, and therefore began to prepare for a campaign to resist the Later Han imperial government. He also believed that he was a senior general who had previously endeared himself to the Later Jin imperial guards (which Later Han had inherited) and therefore might be able to entice them to turn to him, and viewed the Later Han regents with contempt. He also sent secret letters to the Liao court (i.e., to Emperor Taizong's nephew and successor Emperor Shizong), but his letters were intercepted by the Later Han border guards, allowing the Later Han regents to be on alert. He was also encouraged by the Buddhist monk Zonglun (總倫), who predicted that he would be emperor one day. Another fortuneteller also predicted that his daughter-in-law Lady Fu (the wife of his son Li Chongxun (李崇訓) and the daughter of fellow senior general Fu Yanqing) would be empress one day, further encouraging him.

== Rebellion against Later Han ==
In summer 948, Li Shouzhen rose in rebellion against Later Han at Huguo, claiming the title of Prince of Qin. He also enticed Fengxiang (鳳翔, headquartered in modern Baoji, Shaanxi) and Yongxing (永興, headquartered in modern Xi'an, Shaanxi) Circuits to follow him in rebellion (under the leadership of Wang Jingchong and Zhao Siwan, respectively).

The Later Han regents initially sent the general Bai Wenke (白文珂) the military governor of Baoyi Circuit (保義, headquartered in modern Sanmenxia, Henan) against the three rebellious circuits. However, Bai and several other Later Han generals who were sent had little coordination with each other and became defensive in their actions. Concerned about how the campaign was turning out, the regents decided to have Guo Wei lead the imperial guards against Li and coordinate the overall operations. At the suggestion of the senior statesman Feng Dao, who pointed out that the imperial guard soldiers might still bear allegiance in their hearts to Li, Guo awarded the soldiers a great amount of treasure to turn their allegiance to him rather than to Li. Also, accepting the suggestion of Hu Yanke (扈彥珂) the military governor of Zhenguo Circuit (鎮國, headquartered in modern Weinan, Shaanxi), Guo abandoned the original plan advocated by many other generals to attack Yongxing (which Li had renamed back to Jinchang (晉昌, its prior name during Later Jin)) and Fengxiang, and decided to concentrate on defeating Li at Huguo first, believing that Li's destruction would lead to the collapse of the other two circuits.

Guo's imperial guard troops soon arrived at Huguo's capital in Hezhong Municipality (河中). Li had anticipated that they would turn and support him, but the soldiers, having recently received the award of gold from Guo, no longer felt allegiance toward Li, and therefore began the siege enthusiastically, causing Li to be distressed. Guo's subordinates, seeing this, advocated a quick siege, but Guo pointed out that Li had great battlefield credentials and that a quick attack could lead to massive casualties because of the strength of Hezhong's defenses; rather, he resolved to put Hezhong under long-term siege to drain Li's food supplies and morale. As he tightened the encirclement of the city, Li made several attempts to break the siege, each time failing. He attempted to send emissaries to seek aid from Southern Tang, Later Shu, and Liao, but his emissaries were all intercepted. When he questioned Zonglun about Zonglun's predictions, Zonglun stated that the Huguo region was due for a disaster, but that after he suffered great casualties, he would be able to rebound and be victorious; Li believed Zonglun and therefore resolved to continue to resist. (Li Yiyin the military governor of Dingnan Circuit did consider aiding him, but upon hearing that Hezhong was completely surrounded, withdrew.) When Li Shouzhen's emissaries Zhu Yuan and Li Ping (李平) were eventually able to bypass Later Han guards and reach Southern Tang, Southern Tang's emperor Li Jing launched an abortive campaign to try to help him, but eventually concluded that his army could never reach Huguo, and therefore abandoned the campaign. He wrote a letter to Liu Chengyou asking that Li Shouzhen be pardoned; Liu ignored the letter.)

In spring 949, trying to take advantage of a Later Shu incursion intended to aid Wang Jingchong (who was then under siege by the Later Han general Zhao Hui (趙暉)) (as Guo had to leave Huzhong to try to aid Zhao), Li Shouzhen prepared to have his officer Wang Jixun (王繼勳) lead an attack to fight out of the siege. However, by the time that Wang launched his attack, Guo had already returned from the west, and Wang's attempt to fight out was a failure, with Wang himself seriously injured.

By summer 949, the food supplies at Hezhong had run out, and it was said that some 50-60% of the populace had died. Li made another attempt to fight out of the siege, but was again defeated. In the aftermaths of this defeat, Guo decided to make a final assault on the city. In fall 949, the outer city fell, and Li withdrew into the inner city. Guo's subordinates advocated a sustained attack, but Guo decided not to, believing that that may enable Li to make a final counterattack; rather, he had the inner city surrounded. Shortly after, Li, his wife, and a number of other family members, including Li Chongxun, committed suicide by fire. Guo then entered the inner city and captured several surviving sons of Li Shouzhen's, as well as his chancellors, chief of staff, and Zonglun; they were delivered to Kaifeng and executed.

== Notes and references ==
- Old History of the Five Dynasties, vol. 109.
- New History of the Five Dynasties, vol. 52.
- Zizhi Tongjian, vols. 284, 285, 286, 287, 288.

Government offices
Preceded by Liu Chengyou of Later Han	Ruler of China (Southwestern Shanxi/Central Shaanxi); 948–949	Succeeded by Liu Chengyou of Later Han
