= Zhang Yanze =

Chinese general (died 947)

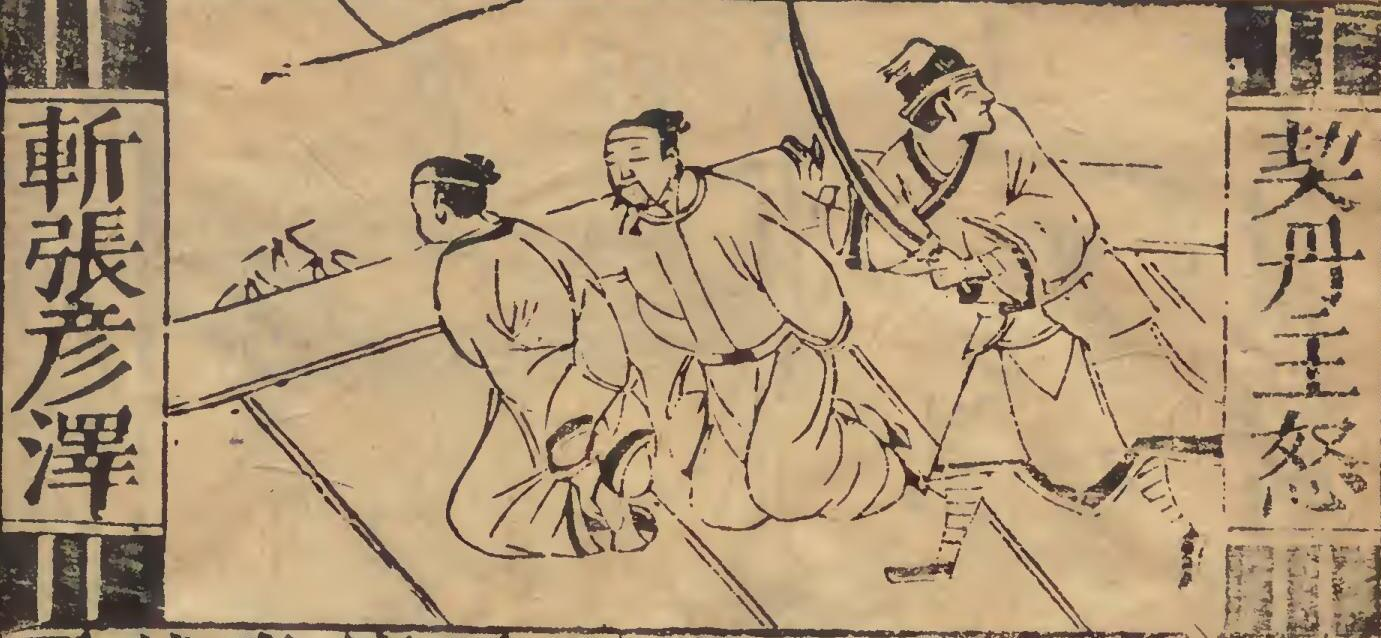
- Execution of Zhang Yanze
- Died: January 27, 947
- Occupation: military official
- Years active: Five Dynasties and Ten Kingdoms Period

Zhang Yanze (Chinese: 張彥澤) (died January 27, 947) was an ethnic Göktürk general of the Later Tang, Later Jin, and Liao dynasties of China. He was reviled in traditional sources for his cruelty, avarice, and lack of faithfulness to the Later Jin.

== Background ==
It is not known when Zhang Yanze was born. He was said to be of Tujue ancestry, but whose ancestors had settled in Taiyuan. Both his grandfather and father served as officers at the special Yinshan Command (陰山府) — a special command of non-Han Chinese soldiers of the north, traditionally commanded by the Shatuo chieftains of the Zhuye (朱邪, later Li (李)) clan, subordinate to the military governor (Jiedushi) of Tang's Hedong Circuit (河東, headquartered in modern Taiyuan, Shanxi). In Zhang Yanze's youth, he was described to be strong and brave, with yellow-tinted eyes that glowed in the dark, making him look animalistic.

== During Later Tang ==
During the reigns of Later Tang's first two emperors, Li Cunxu and Li Siyuan, Zhang Yanze served as a cavalry officer. (It is possible, although not clearly stated in historical accounts, that he might have already been serving under Li Cunxu prior to the founding of Later Tang, when Li Cunxu was the prince of Later Tang's predecessor state Jin.) Due to his accomplishments, he was given terms as prefects for several prefectures. (During this time, his family might have entered into a political alliance by marriage with that of Li Siyuan's son-in-law Shi Jingtang, as suggested by the New History of the Five Dynasties; the Zizhi Tongjian suggested, instead, that the political alliance by marriage was with the family of another general, Yang Guangyuan.)

== During Later Jin ==
=== During Shi Jingtang's reign ===
In 936, Shi Jingtang, with military support from Khitan Empire's Emperor Taizong, overthrew then-ruling Later Tang emperor Li Congke and established his own state of Later Jin. Shi made Zhang Yanze the prefect of Cao Prefecture (曹州, in modern Heze, Shandong). Zhang later served under Yang Guangyuan against Fan Yanguang when Fan rebelled against Shi, and, for Zhang's accomplishments during the campaign against Fan, he was made the military governor of Zhenguo Circuit (鎮國, headquartered in modern Weinan, Shaanxi), and later was moved to Zhangyi Circuit (彰義, headquartered in modern Pingliang, Gansu).

While Zhang governed Zhangyi, one of his close associates was his secretary Zhang Shi (張式), who was a clansman of his. At that time, one of Zhang Yanze's sons also served on his staff, but often displeased his father Zhang Yanze, and was often physically punished by whipping and battering. In or shortly before 941, as the son feared continuous physical punishments, he decided to flee, but was captured when he fled to Qi Prefecture (齊州, in modern Jinan, Shandong) and delivered to the imperial court. Shi ordered that he be sent back to his father Zhang Yanze, believing that Zhang Yanze would not punish his son harshly. Instead, Zhang Yanze wanted to put his son to death. Zhang Shi, finding this to be overly cruel, urged against it repeatedly, such that Zhang Yanze got angry at him and shot at him with arrows. As other close associates of Zhang Yanze's disliked Zhang Shi, they then falsely accused him. In fear, Zhang Shi fled. Zhang Yanze launched soldiers to try to chase Zhang Shi down, but was unable to catch Zhang Shi before Zhang Shi fled to nearby Jingnan Circuit (靜難, headquartered in modern Xianyang, Shaanxi). Jingnan's military governor Li Zhou (李周) reported this to Shi. Shi, not wanting to offend Zhang Yanze, ordered that Zhang Shi be exiled to Shang Prefecture (商州, in modern Shangluo, Shaanxi). Zhang Yanze, however, was not satisfied, and sent the commander of his army, Zheng Yuanzhao (鄭元昭) to the imperial court to demand that Zhang Shi be returned to Zhangyi; Zheng went as far as stating at the imperial court, "If Zhang Yanze were not given Zhang Shi back, there would be unforeseeable consequences." Shi felt compelled to return Zhang Shi to Zhangyi. Upon Zhang Shi's arrival in Zhangyi, Zhang Yanze executed him by cutting open his mouth and his chest, and also cutting off his limbs.

Hearing of his son's cruel death, Zhang Shi's father Zhang Duo (張鐸) went to the imperial court to claim his son's innocence. In 942, as a result, Shi ordered that Zhang Yanze be replaced with Wang Zhou (王周). Once Wang took office, he submitted a report listing 26 unlawful deeds that Zhang Yanze had carried out as military governor of Zhangyi and reporting that, as a result, over 5,000 households had fled or been displaced. Among these additional misdeeds that Wang reported were allegations that he, without imperial order, had attacked non-Han tribes but suffered a crushing defeat; that he, after that defeat, seized over 1,000 horses from the people to replace the lost military horses; and that he had put the officer Yang Hong (楊洪), who had escaped the defeat, in cruel fashion similar to Zhang Shi's death — Yang's limbs were broken before he was decapitated. Despite many imperial officials' urging, including petitions by the consultant Zheng Shouyi (鄭受益) and the deputy minister of justice Li Tao (李濤) that Zhang Yanze be put to death, however, Shi resolved to pardon Zhang due to his past accomplishments and his connections with Yang Guangyuan. He kept Zhang in his imperial guards as a general, only demoting him one rank each in military rank and in noble title, while Zhang Shi's father, brothers, and sons were given commissions, and the people of Zhangyi who fled and returned were given tax relief.

=== During Shi Chonggui's reign ===
Shi Jingtang died later in 942, and was succeeded by his adoptive son (biological nephew) Shi Chonggui. Instead of the submissive attitude that Shi Jingtang showed toward the Khitan (whose state had been renamed Liao by this point), Shi Chonggui took a confrontational attitude, leading to a breakdown in relationship and frequent Liao incursions thereafter. Apparently at the behest of Shi Chonggui's chief of staff (Shumishi) Sang Weihan, Zhang Yanze was often sent out to defend against these incursions as a commanding general of the imperial guards in response, including in 944 and 945. It was said that in the major Later Jin victory over the Liao army commanded by Emperor Taizong himself in 945 at Yangcheng (陽城, in modern Baoding, Hebei), while it was Shi Chonggui's uncle by marriage (Shi Jingtang's brother-in-law) Du Wei who commanded the army overall, none had greater contribution than Zhang, leading to the popular belief at the time that he was giving his entire strength in the effort in appreciation to Shi Jingtang's having spared him from death.

By fall 945, Zhang had apparently been given a new military governorship — that of Zhangde Circuit (彰德, headquartered in modern Anyang, Henan) — for it was by that title he was referred when he was sent to take up position at Heng Prefecture (恆州, in modern Shijiazhuang, Hebei) to defend against a possible Liao incursion. It was said that while serving as the military governor of Zhangde, Zhang was much more respectful of the intelligentsia than he did before and governed the circuit well. While he was stationed at Heng, there were orders that the people of Xing (邢州, in modern Xingtai, Hebei), Wei (魏州, in modern Handan, Hebei), Xiang (相州, Zhangde's capital), and Wei (衛州, in modern Xinxiang, Henan, note different location than the other Wei Prefecture) Prefectures be responsible for delivering military supplies to the front, creating much burden for the commoners, who had to conduct this themselves. Zhang did what he could to reduce the people's burdens, by having the soldiers meet the commoners on the way, receive the supplies from them, and deliver them back to the front, and was praised for this — which also reduced the dangers of the commoners' falling prey to raids by the Liao army or by bandits.

In 946, there were rumors that the major Liao general Zhao Yanshou — who had previously been a major Later Tang general before being captured by the Khitan in the campaign that led to Later Tang's destruction — was planning on defecting to Later Jin. This rumor was believed by Shi's chiefs of staff Li Song and Feng Yu (the brother of Shi's wife Empress Feng). They had Du write a letter to Zhao, encouraging him to do so, with the officer Zhao Xingshi (趙行實), who had previously served under Zhao Yanshou, delivering the letter. Zhao Yanshou wrote back (to try to lead Later Jin forces into a trap), stating, "I have long been in a foreign land, and I want to return to China. Please launch a major army to support me, so that I can pull myself out and return with it." Subsequently, under Emperor Taizong's orders, Liao's prefect of Ying Prefecture (瀛州, in modern Cangzhou), Liu Yanzuo (劉延祚), also offered to defect to Later Jin. Shi thus put Du and Li Shouzhen in command of an army to attack north, with the stated objectives being to first recapture the prefectures Shi Jingtang previously ceded to Liao (the Sixteen Prefectures), and then to destroy Liao. When Du and Li Shouzhen advanced, though, they were met by a large army that Emperor Taizong personally commanded. Du and Li initially intended to withdraw quickly, but Zhang joined forces with them and argued that the Liao army could be defeated, and so they remained in the region for some time. However, the Liao army eventually surrounded the Later Jin army at Zhongdu Bridge (中度橋, in modern Baoding). After Emperor Taizong made the promise to Du to make him emperor if he surrendered, Du and Li surrendered their army. Zhang surrendered to Liao as part of this surrender.

== After surrender to Liao ==
Emperor Taizong, after accepting Du Chongwei's and Li Shouzhen's surrender, took his army south, along with the now-surrendered Later Jin army, toward the Later Jin capital Daliang. He sent Zhang Yanze ahead of him to take control of Daliang, with 2,000 cavalry soldiers.

As Zhang approached Daliang, he met some minimal Later Jin resistance but was able to defeat it and continue into the city. Seeing no hope of resisting, Shi Chonggui initially wanted to commit suicide, but was stopped by his officer Xue Chao (薛超), and thereafter submitted petitions on his own behalf and that of his aunt/adoptive mother (Shi Jingtang's wife) Empress Dowager Li, surrendering to the Liao emperor. He also summoned Zhang, wanting to confer with Zhang what his appropriate response should be. Zhang declined, stating, "I, your subject, do not have the face to meet Your Imperial Majesty." Zhang forced Sang Weihan (who was no longer Shi's chief of staff but was serving as the mayor of Kaifeng Municipality (i.e., the Daliang region)) to meet him, and after Sang rebuked him, strangled Sang to death, while reporting to Emperor Taizong (who had no intent of killing Sang) that Sang had committed suicide. He also put Shi's close associate, the director of palace affairs, Meng Chenghui (孟承誨), to death.

Zhang had his soldiers pillage the city of its wealth, and the poor also took the opportunity to join in the pillaging of the rich households. Many of the rich died in the disturbance. This lasted for two days, and it was said that the city was effectively stripped of its wealth, while the treasures piled up like a hill in Zhang's headquarters. Believing that he has carried out a great contribution for Emperor Taizong, he paid no careful heed to his actions, spending days and nights in drinking and entertainment. Whenever he ventured out of his headquarters, he was accompanied by several hundred cavalry soldiers bearing the banner of, "Faithfulness to the Lord." He executed many people, often by cutting them in halves at the waist. Bearing a grudge against the official Gao Xun (高勳), he went to Gao's mansion and killed Gao's uncle(s) and younger brother(s). Li Tao, believing that he could not escape death if he tried to flee, instead decided to go see him, submitting a note stating, "Li Tao, a man who had petitioned for the death of the Taiwei [(太尉, an honorary title that Zhang carried)], comes to now to seek his death." Zhang met him happily, stating, "Are you fearful now, Sheren [(as Li Tao was then Zhongshu Sheren (中書舍人))]?" Li Tao responded, "Li Tao's fear today is the same as the fear that Your Excellency had back then. If Emperor Gaozu [(i.e., Shi Jingtang)] had accepted my words, how would this have happened?" Zhang laughed, and after drinking with Li Tao, released him.

Zhang then forced Shi Chonggui and his family to move out of the palace to temporary living quarters at the Kaifeng Municipal Government offices and surrender all their treasure. Some of the treasures were presented to Emperor Taizong, while Zhang kept the rest himself. He also seized the mother of Shi Chonggui's adoptive son (probably a grandson of Shi Jingtang's) Shi Yanxu (石延煦), Lady Ding the Lady of Chu, apparently to be his concubine.

Emperor Taizong shortly after arrived at Daliang and took control of the city. Gao Xun (who was apparently in the group of Later Jin officials who accompanied Emperor Taizong) found out about his family members' deaths, and complained about it to Emperor Taizong. Emperor Taizong was also angry that Zhang had pillaged the city, so he ordered Zhang and the interpreter Fu Zhu'er (傅住兒), who had accompanied Zhang to Daliang, arrested and locked in chains. Emperor Taizong presented a list of the charges against Zhang to the officials, asking them, "Does this call for death?" They all stated in the affirmative, and at that time, the general populace also submitted many petitions accusing Zhang of crimes. Emperor Taizong thus ordered Zhang and Fu put to death by beheading, with Gao overseeing the execution. As Zhang and Fu were taken to the northern market, where they would be executed publicly, the descendants of the officials that Zhang had killed stood by on the way in mourning clothes, crying, cursing at him, and hitting him with staffs. When they reached the execution field, Gao had Zhang removed from the shackles not by removing the shackles but by cutting off his hands at the wrist. After he was beheaded, his heart was cut out of his body to be sacrificed to those whom he had killed. The people rushed in to break his skull open and to eat his flesh.

== Notes and references ==
- Old History of the Five Dynasties, vol. 98.
- New History of the Five Dynasties, vol. 52.
- Zizhi Tongjian, vols. 282, 283, 284, 285, 286.
