= Yang Guangyuan =

Chinese prince and general (died 945)

Yang Guangyuan (Chinese: 楊光遠; died January 21, 945), né Atan (阿檀), later known as Yang Tang (楊檀) before changing his name to Guangyuan, courtesy name Deming (德明), formally the Prince of Qi (齊王), was a general of the Chinese Five Dynasties and Ten Kingdoms period Later Tang (and Later Tang's predecessor state Jin) and the Later Jinstates. He rebelled against Later Jin in 944, believing that he would prevail with aid from the Khitan Liao dynasty, but after the Liao aid forces were repelled by Later Jin forces, his son Yang Chengxun (楊承勳) put him under arrest and surrendered. He was subsequently killed by soldiers sent by the Later Jin general Li Shouzhen.

== Background ==
It is not known when Yang Guangyuan was born. He was ethnically Shatuo, and his family originally did not have a Chinese surname. His father was originally named Adengchuo (阿瞪啜), but later took the Chinese name of Yang Zhen (楊瑊). He himself originally had the name of Atan (阿檀), but later, after his family took the surname of Yang, became known as Yang Tan (楊檀).

Yang Tan's father Yang Zhen served as an officer under the major late Tang dynasty warlord Li Keyong, who was also ethnically Shatuo. Yang Tan thus later served as a cavalry officer under Li Keyong's son Li Cunxu, who then reigned the independent state Jin as its prince, although formally still regarding his state as a part of the defunct Tang dynasty.

== During Jin ==
When Li Cunxu ordered his major general Zhou Dewei to attack the rival state Yan in late 911, Yang Tan served under Zhou in the campaign. After Jin forces under Zhou and Li Cunxu himself destroyed Yan around the new year 914, and Li Cunxu subsequently commissioned Zhou as the military governor (Jiedushi) of Lulong Circuit (盧龍, headquartered in modern Beijing)—the main circuit of the former Yan state—Yang appeared to remain under Zhou's command at Lulong. In a subsequent campaign when the Khitan Empire attacked Xin Prefecture (新州, in modern Zhangjiakou, Hebei), apparently in 917, Yang served under Zhou in resisting the Khitan. During that battle, Yang suffered an injury to one of his arms—probably a fracture—that eventually led to the arm becoming useless. He thus left military service and stayed at home thereafter.

== During Later Tang ==
=== During Li Cunxu's reign as emperor ===
In 923, Li Cunxu declared himself emperor of a new Later Tang, and later that year, he destroyed archrival Later Liang and took its territory under his control. He remembered Yang Tan's past contributions, and brought him back into active service, as a commander of the Lulong cavalry and infantry, stationed at Waqiao Pass (瓦橋關, in modern Baoding, Hebei).

=== During Li Siyuan's reign ===
In 926, Li Cunxu was killed in a mutiny at then-capital Luoyang. His adoptive brother Li Siyuan became emperor. During Li Siyuan's reign, Yang Tan served successively as the prefect of four prefectures—Gui (媯州, in modern Zhangjiakou), Ying (瀛州, in modern Cangzhou, Hebei), Yi (易州, in modern Baoding), and Ji (冀州, in modern Hengshui, Hebei). It was said that while Yang was illiterate, he was capable in speaking and administration, such that he developed a good reputation in his governance and earned Li Siyuan's respect. At one point, while he was serving at Ji, there was a controversy as to the issue of whether Later Tang should, as part of the attempt of negotiating a peace with the Khitan, return a number of captured Khitan officers to the Khitan (as Khitan repeatedly requested). Yang argued that these officers were important in the Khitan army, and that, having lived in Later Tang territory for a number of years, knew the strengths and the weaknesses of the Later Tang defense. He further argued that returning these officers would allow the Khitan to exploit the weaknesses in attacking Later Tang. Li Siyuan agreed, and did not return them to the Khitan.

=== After Li Siyuan's reign ===
As of 934—when Li Siyuan's adoptive son Li Congke was emperor—Yang Tan was serving as the military governor of Zhenwu Circuit (振武, headquartered in modern Shuozhou, Shanxi). That year, there was a Khitan incursion into Later Tang's Yun Prefecture (雲州, in modern Datong, Shanxi). Yang launched his troops and repelled the Khitan incursion.

In 935, Li Congke bestowed a new name of Guangyuan on Yang. (This name changed was prompted by the fact that the "Tan" character in Yang's name included the character of "Dan," which Li Siyuan had taken on as a name after he became emperor, and therefore what somewhat of a violation of naming taboo.)

Yang was later transferred to be the military governor of Yiwu Circuit (義武, headquartered in modern Baoding), and was serving there as of 936. That year, Li Congke's brother-in-law (Li Siyuan's son-in-law) Shi Jingtang the military governor of Hedong Circuit (河東, headquartered in modern Taiyuan, Shanxi) rebelled against Li Congke and sought aid from the Khitan. Li Congke put Zhang Jingda in command of the army against Shi and made Yang his deputy. Zhang's army quickly put Hedong's capital Taiyuan Municipality under siege, but when the Khitan relief army arrived under the command of the Khitan Emperor Taizong, the Later Tang army was routed. The joint Khitan/Hedong army subsequently put Zhang's army under siege at Jin'an Base (晉安寨, near Taiyuan). After several months under siege and no way to fight out of the siege, both Yang and An Shenqi (安審琦) tried to persuade Zhang to surrender. Zhang, citing that he did not want to turn against Li Congke, refused. Yang thereafter assassinated him and surrendered, submitting to the command of Emperor Taizong and Shi—whom Emperor Taizong had declared emperor of a new Later Jin. (Shi subsequently headed toward Luoyang. Li Congke, believing resistance to be futile, committed suicide with his family, ending Later Tang and allowing Later Jin to take over its territory.)

== During Later Jin ==
=== During Shi Jingtang's reign ===
Shi Jingtang, for the time being, set his capital at Luoyang. (He would later move the capital to Daliang.) He commissioned Yang Guangyuan as the military governor of Xuanwu Circuit (宣武, headquartered at Daliang); he also gave Yang the honorary titles of acting Taiwei (太尉) and chancellor (同中書門下平章事, Tong Zhongshu Menxia Pingzhangshi), and put him in command of the imperial guards at Luoyang. However, it was said that whenever Shi saw Yang, Yang always had an unhappy expression, and Shi became concerned about his loyalty. Shi sent his close associates to inquire of this from Yang. Yang's response to Shi, through them, was that while he was highly honored, he felt that it was Zhang Jingda who died an honorable death and that he could not compare to Zhang, and that was what was making him sad. Shi thus believed him to be honest and faithful, but historical accounts indicated that this was a statement to intentionally create the impression of faithfulness. In 937, Shi gave Yang the greater honorary chancellor title of Shizhong (侍中).

Around the same time, Fan Yanguang the military governor of Tianxiong Circuit (天雄, headquartered in modern Handan, Hebei) rebelled against Shi's rule. Shi put Yang in charge of the operations against Fan. When Yang's army reached Hua Prefecture (滑州, in modern Anyang, Henan), there happened to be a disturbance there over one imperial general (Fu Yanrao (符彥饒)) killing another (Bai Fengjin (白奉進)) over disciplinary disputes. Hearing of this disturbance, Yang's soldiers wanted to mutiny and declare him emperor. He responded to them, "Is a Son of Heaven something you peddle as merchandise? The surrender at Jinyang [(i.e., at Jin'an Base)] was due to duress. If I again change my colors, I would truly be a rebellious bandit." The soldiers thereafter did not dare to speak of this again. He put Tianxiong's capital Guangjin Municipality (廣晉) under siege. Fan wanted to surrender, but initially Shi declined his surrender, so Yang continued the siege. Meanwhile, it was said that Yang became arrogant about his power and was trying to participate in imperial policy decisions, and Shi was treating him meekly, giving his sons honorable offices and giving a daughter, Princess Chang'an, in marriage to his son Yang Chengzuo (楊承祚). In fall 938, with both the imperial army and Fan's army worn out, Shi accepted Fan's surrender, allowing Yang to enter the city. He delivered Fan and his sons to Daliang, which had become capital by that point. Shi subsequently made him the military governor of Tianxiong.

Meanwhile, during the Guangjin campaign, it was said that Yang made many requests that were against regulations, and while Shi was not particularly agreeing or disagreeing with them, Shi's chief of staff and chancellor Sang Weihan was often ruling against him. When Yang complained about this to the director of palace affairs, Liu Churang, who disliked Sang, blamed this on Sang and the other chief of staff and chancellor Li Song. After the Guangjin campaign, Yang submitted a petition accusing Sang and Li of faults. Shi did not want to go against his wishes, and therefore relieved Sang and Li from their posts as chiefs of staff (but had them remain as chancellors), making Liu chief of staff instead. However, he also became concerned that Yang was so interfering in imperial governmental matters and difficult to control. At Sang's suggestion, he moved Yang to Heyang Circuit (河陽, headquartered in modern Jiaozuo, Henan) and also gave him the titles of defender of Luoyang and full Taiwei, effectively stripping him of the powerful Tianxiong army (which Shi then divided in three, giving the commands to Gao Xingzhou, Wang Tingyin (王廷胤), and Wang Zhou (王周)). It was said that this caused Yang to begin to be resentful of Shi and be in secret communications with Khitan's Emperor Taizong, offering tributes to the Khitan emperor. He also began to maintain a personal army of over 1,000 soldiers. He further continued to submit petitions to accuse Sang of ruling unfairly and letting the government compete with private merchants. In 939, Shi thus felt compelled to remove Sang from his chancellor position and send him out to serve as the military governor of Zhangde Circuit (彰德, headquartered in modern Anyang, which was previously given to Wang Zhou).

By 940, Fan had retired, and wanted to take up residence at Heyang. Shi initially agreed. Yang, however, was both envious of the wealth he had and concerned that, given their past adversarial relationship during the Guangjin campaign, that Fan might be up to no good. He thus suggested to Shi that Fan be killed. Shi refused, but agreed with Yang's subsequent proposal to have Fan take up residence at Luoyang. Yang subsequently surrounded Fan's mansion with his soldiers, and later dragged Fan to the Yellow River and pushed him into it to drown, while claiming that Fan had committed suicide.

Later in 940, Yang went to Daliang to pay tribute to the emperor. Shi, wanting to weaken his authority, stated that several of his officers all had great accomplishments during the Guangjin campaign and should be rewarded, and then made the prefectural prefects (i.e., removed them from Yang's command structure). He subsequently moved Yang to Pinglu Circuit (平盧, headquartered in modern Weifang, Shandong) and created him the Prince of Dongping. In 942, after Zhang Yanze the military governor of Zhangyi Circuit (彰義, headquartered in modern Pingliang, Gansu) was removed due to his cruelty, most imperial officials advocated Zhang's death. However, as one of Zhang's children was married to one of Yang's children, Shi spared Zhang and let him remain as an imperial guard general.

=== During Shi Chonggui's reign ===
Shi Jingtang died later in 942 and was succeeded as emperor by his nephew Shi Chonggui the Prince of Qi, who was supported in the succession by the general Jing Yanguang and the chancellor Feng Dao. As a result, early in his reign, Jing became powerful. Late in 943, there was an occasion when Jing ordered Yang Guangyuan to return 300 horses that Shi Jingtang had lent from the imperial guard corps to the Pinglu army. Yang believed that this move was targeting him and became angry. He secretly summoned his son Yang Chengzuo, who was then serving as the prefect of Dan Prefecture (單州, in modern Heze, Shandong), to his capital Qing Prefecture (青州). Yang Chengzuo thus, claiming that his mother was ill, opened the city gates one night and fled to Qing. Shi Chonggui, in order to try to comfort Yang, sent a close associate to Qing to gift him jade belts, imperial horses, gold, and silver, but also sent the imperial guard generals Guo Jin (郭謹) and Cai Xingyu (蔡行遇) to Pinglu's neighboring circuit Tianping Circuit (天平, headquartered in modern Tai'an, Shandong), apparently to defend against a potential attack from Yang, while Yang had the prefect of Zi Prefecture (淄州, in modern Zibo, Shandong) arrested and taken back to Qing.

Shi Chonggui tried to placate Yang by commissioning Yang Chengzuo as the prefect of one of Pinglu's prefectures, Deng Prefecture (登州, in modern Yantai, Shandong). This, however, only caused Yang to be more arrogant, and he secretly encouraged Emperor Taizong (who had changed his state's name from Khitan to Liao by that point) to attack Later Jin, citing, as the reason, that Shi Chonggui had turned away from the close tributary relationship Later Jin had with Liao. The Liao general Zhao Yanshou (who had previously been a Later Tang general) also advocated the same, so Emperor Taizong began to plan an invasion into Later Jin in earnest. Meanwhile, Shi Chonggui's uncle by marriage, Du Wei the military governor of Chengde Circuit (成德, headquartered in modern Shijiazhuang, Hebei) sent his staff member Cao Guangyi (曹光裔) to meet Yang, trying to persuade him that rebellion was a dangerous course. Yang sent Cao back with a message stating, "The only reason why Yang Guangzuo fled home was because of his mother's illness. Now that he has been forgiven, our entire clan thanks the Emperor for his grace." For the time being, Shi believed him, and sent another close associate and Cao back to Pinglu to comfort him.

Emperor Taizong nevertheless launched an attack against Later Jin in spring 944, planning to join with Yang. The Liao forces quickly reached Tianxiong, and then planned to cross the Yellow River at Majia Ford (馬家口, in modern Liaocheng, Shandong). The Later Jin forces defended all of the major Yellow River crossings in the area to block of the Liao forces, and they were unable to cross. Yang launched his own forces to try to join with the Liao forces as well, and he put Di Prefecture (棣州, in modern Binzhou, Shandong) under siege. Di's prefect Li Qiong (李瓊), however, repelled him, forcing him to retreat back to Qing. A further attempt by Liao forces to cross the Yellow River was also repelled by Later Jin forces, and Liao forces withdrew.

With Liao forces gone, the Later Jin forces started the direct assault on Pinglu in earnest. Shi sent Li Shouzhen the military governor of Taining Circuit (泰寧, headquartered in modern Jining, Shandong), to attack Qing. (Why he sent Li Shouzhen was that Li Shouzhen and Yang previously had grudges with each other.) By the time of new year 945, the food supply in the city was exhausted, and many people have starved to death. This caused Yang to, while bowing toward the direction of Liao, lament, "Emperor, Emperor, you have failed Guangyuan." His sons Yang Chengxun, Yang Chengzuo, and Yang Chengxin (楊承信) tried to persuade him to surrender, hoping that the clan could be saved, but he refused. Yang Chengxun finally forcibly seized Yang Guangyuan and put him under house arrest, executed a number of staff members who had encouraged his rebellion, and then surrendered to Li Shouzhen.

Shi was unsure what to do with Yang Guangyuan at first—he believed that Yang Guangyuan's crimes could not allow him to be spared, but also did not want to publicly execute him given that his sons surrendered. He therefore ordered Li Shouzhen to try to secretly kill him. Li thus entered Qing, and sent soldiers to batter Yang to death, but publicly announced that Yang had died from an illness. His sons were spared, and Shi in fact commissioned Yang Chengxun as the defender of Ru Prefecture (汝州, in modern Pingdingshan, Henan). (Later, after Liao's Emperor Taizong destroyed Later Jin, he accused Yang Chengxun of having murdered his father and betrayed Liao, and had Yang Chengxun put to death, while making Yang Chengxin the military governor of Shandong. After Liao withdrew from the Central Plains, the succeeding Later Han's founder Liu Zhiyuan posthumously honored Yang Guangyuan as the Prince of Qi and built a monument for him, but the monument soon thereafter fell on its own.)

== Notes and references ==
- History of the Five Dynasties, vol. 97.
- New History of the Five Dynasties, vol. 51.
- Zizhi Tongjian, vols. 277, 279, 280, 281, 282, 283, 284.
