= Jing Yanguang =

Jing Yanguang (Chinese: 景延廣) (892-January 28, 947), courtesy name Hangchuan (航川), was a general and official of the Chinese Five Dynasties and Ten Kingdoms period Later Jin state. He was instrumental in the enthronement of Later Jin's second emperor Shi Chonggui, and therefore became a powerful chancellor early in Shi Chonggui's reign. Under his advocacy, Shi Chonggui turned away from the peaceful, submissive relationship that Later Jin had with its northern neighbor Liao (whose Emperor Taizong's support had been essential in the establishment of Later Jin by Shi Chonggui's uncle and predecessor Shi Jingtang) and became confrontational against Liao. The adversarial relationship continued even after Jing's removal as chancellor, such that Later Jin was eventually destroyed by a Liao invasion. Emperor Taizong took Jing captive, intending to deliver him to Liao proper, but Jing committed suicide.

== Background ==
Jing Yanguang was born in 892, during the reign of Emperor Zhaozong of Tang. His family was from Shan Prefecture (陝州, in modern Sanmenxia, Henan), but all that is said about his family in traditional sources is that his father Jing Jian (景建) was a capable archer and trained Jing Yanguang to be one as well.

== During Later Liang ==
During the time of Tang's successor state Later Liang, Zhu Youhui (朱友誨) the Prince of Shao, a nephew to Later Liang's founding emperor Zhu Quanzhong, served as the military governor (Jiedushi) of Zhenguo Circuit (鎮國, headquartered at Shan Prefecture). He took Jing to be an officer under him. Later, after Zhu Youhui was accused of plotting a rebellion and was put under house arrest, Jing fled to avoid arrest. He later served under Yin Hao (尹皓), who commanded the army at Hua Prefecture (華州, in modern Weinan, Shaanxi). Yin was apparently impressed with him sufficiently to recommend him to be transferred to the Later Liang imperial guard corps at Bian Prefecture (汴州, i.e., the Later Liang capital Daliang). Jing later served under the prominent general Wang Yanzhang in resisting the army of Li Cunxu, the prince of Later Liang's archrival Jin. Later, after Li Cunxu claimed the title of emperor of a new state of Later Tang and launched a surprise attack into Later Liang territory, Wang made a futile attempt to try to stop him at Zhongdu (中都, in modern Jining, Shandong). Wang's army was crushed, and Wang was captured and executed after refusing to surrender. Jing suffered several serious wounds during this battle, and was captured by the Later Tang army and taken by them to Daliang, which fell to Li Cunxu. (Later Liang's last emperor Zhu Zhen committed suicide as the city fell, ending Later Liang, whose territory was taken over by Later Tang.)

== During Later Tang ==
After Later Liang's fall, Jing Yanguang apparently returned to serve in the army at Bian (which Later Tang converted back to the Tang-established Xuanwu Circuit (宣武), as Later Tang placed its capital at Luoyang, not Daliang). In 927, by which time Li Cunxu's adoptive brother Li Siyuan was emperor, Li Siyuan decided to visit Bian. Then-military governor of Xuanwu, Zhu Shouyin, believed that Li Siyuan was intending to act against him, rebelled, but was quickly defeated, and he committed suicide. Many of Zhu's officers, including Jing, were set to be executed. These executions were set to be carried out by Li Siyuan's son-in-law Shi Jingtang. When Shi saw Jing, however, he took pity on Jing, and secretly released him and told him to flee. Later, apparently after Shi became the military governor of Hedong Circuit (河東, headquartered in modern Taiyuan, Shanxi), Jing came to serve under him as a "guest general" (客將, kejiang).

When Shi rebelled against then-emperor Li Congke (Li Siyuan's adoptive son) in 936, Li Congke sent the general Zhang Jingda to siege Hedong's capital Taiyuan. Jing participated in the city's defense and had much accomplishment during the siege, during which Zhang almost, but was never able to, capture the city. Subsequently, Emperor Taizong of Later Tang's northern rival Khitan Empire came to Shi's rescue and defeated Zhang. He then declared Shi the emperor of China (as emperor of a new state of Later Jin).

== During Later Jin ==
=== During Shi Jingtang's reign ===
Shi Jingtang commissioned Jing Yanguang as the commander of his infantry. He was also given the honorary titles of acting Situ (司徒) and military prefect (團練使, Tuanlianshi) of Guo Prefecture (果州, in modern Nanchong, Sichuan, then ruled by Later Shu). Later (it is unclear whether this was before or after the Khitan/Later Jin forces destroyed Later Tang later in the year, allowing Later Jin to take over Later Tang's territory), he was given the honorary titles of acting Taibao (太保) and military governor of Ningjiang Circuit (寧江, headquartered in modern Chongqing, then also ruled by Later Shu).

In 939, Jing was sent out of then-capital Daliang to serve as the military governor of Yicheng Circuit (義成, headquartered in modern Anyang, Henan). In 940, he was given the honorary title of acting Taifu (太傅) and transferred to Baoyi Circuit (保義, headquartered in modern Sanmenxia, i.e., the same circuit formerly known as Zhenguo during Later Liang). In 941, he was recalled to serve as the disciplinary officer for the imperial guards. He was also made the military governor of Heyang Circuit (河陽, headquartered in modern Jiaozuo, Henan).

In 942, Shi Jingtang fell deathly ill. He initially entrusted his young (and only surviving) son Shi Chongrui (石重睿) to the senior chancellor Feng Dao, intending that Feng support Shi Chongrui in succeeding to the throne. However, after Shi Jingtang died shortly after, Feng discussed the matter with Jing, and they decided that as the realm was troubled at the time, the state needed an older emperor. They thus supported Shi Jingtang's biological nephew and adoptive son Shi Chonggui the Prince of Qi as emperor.

=== During Shi Chonggui's reign ===
==== Chancellorship ====
It was said that Jing Yanguang considered Shi Chonggui's ascension to the throne to be his doing, and used that to become involved in the key decisions in Shi's administration. Shortly after Shi took the throne, he was made the commander of the imperial guards, as well as chancellor (with the designation Tong Zhongshu Menxia Pingzhangshi (同中書門下平章事). He was also apparently given the military governorship of Tianping Circuit (天平, headquartered in modern Tai'an, Shandong), but remained at Daliang.

One of the immediate diplomatic decisions was how Shi Jingtang's death and Shi Chonggui's ascension was to be reported to Khitan (which has renamed itself Liao by this point). Most officials suggested submitting a report to Emperor Taizong and having Shi Chonggui refer to himself as "your subject" in the report, to show submission. Jing, however, advocated a letter (to show equality between the states) and having Shi Chonggui refer to himself as "your grandson" and not "subject." (The reference to being "grandson" was based on the fact that Shi Jingtang referred to himself as "your son" when corresponding with Emperor Taizong). Fellow chancellor Li Song argued that Jing's suggestion would eventually lead to war, but Jing insisted. With Feng neither agreeing nor disagreeing with Jing, Shi Chonggui accepted Jing's proposal. This caused Emperor Taizong to be angered. He sent an emissary rebuking Shi Chonggui for taking the throne without first seeking his approval. Jing wrote back an impudent response, although the text of the response was not recorded.

With this apparent break in relations, Jing persuaded Shi Chonggui to arrest Liao's trade liaison officer at Daliang, Qiao Rong (喬榮), and seize all of property owned by the Liao liaison office. Further, all of the other Liao-authorized merchant officers within the Later Jin realm were seized and executed, and their property was seized. With the other officials pointing out that it was Liao aid that led to Later Jin's establishment, Shi released Qiao in 943, comforted him with kind words, and returned him to Liao. However, before Qiao's departure, Qiao went to bid Jing farewell. Jing, arrogantly, stated to him:

Tell your master: the deceased emperor [(i.e., Shi Jingtang)] was placed in his position by the northern dynasty [(i.e., Liao)], and that is why he claimed himself to be a subject and submitted reports. The current emperor was placed in his position by China itself. The only reason why he subordinated himself to the northern dynasty is that he did not forget the alliance the deceased emperor entered. It was enough for him to claim himself to be a grandson; there is no reason for him to claim himself to be a subject. The emperor of the northern dynasty should not be deluded by [Liao general] Zhao Yanshou such that he insults China. You have seen the soldiers and horses that China possesses. If the grandfather is angry, he can come and battle us. The grandson has 100,000 sharpened swords waiting for him. If he were defeated by his grandson, he would become the laughing stock of the entire world. Do not forget this!

As Qiao feared that Emperor Taizong would blame him for the loss of the Liao wealth, he flattered Jing and requested that Jing write his words down on paper. Jing had his secretary write down the words and give them to Qiao. When Qiao presented them to Emperor Taizong, Emperor Taizong was incensed, and therefore became resolute that he would attack Later Jin. He had the Later Jin emissaries detained at You Prefecture (幽州, in modern Beijing) and refused to see them himself. Even though Sang Weihan (who negotiated the original alliance between Shi Jingtang and Emperor Taizong) repeatedly suggested that Shi Chonggui revert to subservience to Liao to avoid a war, Jing repeatedly stopped Shi from doing so.

Meanwhile, while Shi Jingtang was alive, he had lent 300 horses from the imperial guards corps to Yang Guangyuan the military governor of Pinglu Circuit (平盧, headquartered in modern Weifang, Shandong). Jing demanded them back. Yang became angry and believed that the imperial government was suspecting him, and therefore secretly summoned his son Yang Chengzuo (楊承祚) back to Pinglu's capital Qing Prefecture (青州), and then prepared to rebel. In spring 944, Yang rebelled, and Emperor Taizong led a Liao army south to support him. Shi Chonggui mobilized the Later Jin troops to counter the Liao and Pinglu troops, with Jing in charge of the overall operations. It was said that Jing, impressed with his own power, was insulting to the other generals, such that even the emperor was unable to curb him.

The second Liao thrust, led by Yelü Andu toward Hedong, however, was repelled by Hedong's military governor Liu Zhiyuan. Later Jin's prefect of Bo Prefecture (博州, in modern Liaocheng, Shandong), Zhou Ru (周儒), who was in secret communications with Yang Guangyuan, surrendered Bo to Liao forces, and encouraged them to cross the Yellow River at Majiakou (馬家口, in modern Liaocheng), to join forces with Yang. Jing was convinced by Yan Kan (顏衎) the acting military governor of Tianping that if Liao forces were able to cross the river, disaster would ensue, so the Later Jin imperial forces concentrated on battling Liao forces at Majiakou to prevent them from successfully crossing, and were able to do so. In anger, Liao forces slaughtered Han civilians that they had captured, which led to fiercer resistance from the populace. Later in spring 944, the armies commanded by the two emperors confronted each other near Yedu, but did not engage each other. Eventually, the Liao forces withdrew, pillaging as it went along over Later Jin's territory north of the Yellow River. Yang led his own troops west from Pinglu's capital Qing Prefecture (青州), and tried to meet the Liao forces at the Yellow River, but by the time he reached there, Liao forces had already left.

The Later Jin forces were able to repel the Liao aid force, and Yang was eventually defeated by the Later Jin general Li Shouzhen. Yang's son Yang Chengxun (楊承勳) put his own father under arrest, and then surrendered, ending Yang Guangyuan's rebellion. (Under imperial orders, Li Shouzhen had Yang Guangyuan secretly executed.) However, this campaign would be Jing's downfall as well, as during the resistance against Liao, Jing had issued an order that generals were to defend their positions and not to aid each other. As a result, Liao forces put three key Later Jin generals, Gao Xingzhou, Fu Yanqing, and Shi Gongba (石公霸), under siege at Qicheng (戚城, in modern Puyang, Henan), and the city nearly fell. Despite the seriousness of the situation, Jing did not report this to the emperor quickly. When Shi Chonggui realized this, he himself led an army to lift the siege on Qicheng. The three generals accused Jing of not taking the situation seriously. With other generals all resenting Jing's power, and Shi himself apprehensive of Jing, Sang suggested that Shi use the Qicheng incident as a reason to remove Jing. In summer 944, Shi commissioned Jing as the defender of Luoyang and sent him away from Daliang, although Shi gave him the greater chancellor title Shizhong (侍中) as an honorary title. He was replaced by Gao as the commander of the imperial guards.

==== After chancellorship ====
It was said that the demotion from chancellorship depressed Jing Yanguang, who was also beginning to realize that Liao's strength would eventually endanger both himself and the state. He began drinking heavily. Meanwhile, as the campaign that repelled Liao drained the imperial treasury, Shi Chonggui sent out 36 emissaries to the various regions of his realm to have the local governments extract wealth from the people forcibly. Jing's Henan Municipality (河南, i.e., the Luoyang region) was to submit 200,000 coins. Jing, wanting to extract more, offered 370,000 coins, but his assistant Lu Yi (盧億) rebuked him for benefitting himself at the people's expense, and he stopped.

In 945, Emperor Taizong made another major incursion into Later Jin territory, advancing to the vicinity of Yedu (鄴都, in modern Handan, Hebei). During this incursion, as part of the overall Later Jing defense efforts, Jing took his position at Huliang Ford (胡梁度, in modern Anyang). After a series of attacks and counterattacks on both sides, the main Later Jin army, under the command of Shi's uncle by marriage, Du Wei, defeated the Liao army near Yangcheng (陽城, in modern Baoding, Hebei). Still, under Sang Weihan's advice, Shi Chonggui sent the emissary Zhang Hui (張暉) to Liao, seeking peace. Emperor Taizong demanded to see Sang and Jing and to have Shunguo (順國, headquartered in modern Shijiazhuang, Hebei) and Yiwu (義武, headquartered in modern Baoding) Circuits ceded to him before there could be peace. Shi, finding the demands insulting, cut off negotiations.

In 946, Emperor Taizong laid a trap for Later Jing. He had Zhao Yanshou write to Du, offering to surrender Lulong Circuit (盧龍, headquartered at You Prefecture) to Later Jin. Shi's then-chiefs of staff, Li Song and Feng Yu, believed in Zhao's letter, and advised Shi to accept. Shi commissioned another army, with Du in command and Li Shouzhen serving as Du's assistant, to advance north. Once they entered Liao territory, however, Emperor Taizong's army was ready to face them. They tried to retreat, but were surrounded at Zhongdu Bridge (中度橋, in modern Baoding). During this crisis, Jing was, per Shi's orders, stationed at Heyang to prepare for emergency operations. However, Emperor Taizong was then able to persuade Du and Li Shouzhen to surrender their army. He then advanced quickly toward Daliang. Finding the situation hopeless, Shi surrendered, ending Later Jin.

== After Later Jin's destruction ==
Even before Emperor Taizong could arrive at Daliang to accept Shi Chonggui's surrender, he notified Shi, again, that he wanted to see Sang Weihan and Jing Yanguang. When he reached Xiang Prefecture (相州, in modern Anyang), he sent soldiers to Heyang to arrest Jing. Jing was surprised by this move and believed that he could not flee, so he went to see Emperor Taizong, meeting the Liao emperor at Fengqiu (封丘, in modern Xinxiang, Henan). Emperor Taizong rebuked him, "Your actions were what led to the discord between the two emperors. Where are your 100,000 sharpened swords?" Emperor Taizong also summoned Qiao Rong to list 10 things that Jing did that he believed led to the enmity between the states. Jing initially denied them, but once Qiao showed the papers that his secretary had written, he admitted to them. Emperor Taizong read off the things he was accused of, and gave him one ivory chip as each one was read. When the eighth ivory chip was given, Jing fell prostrate and begged for death. Emperor Taizong then had him locked up in chains.

Emperor Taizong then prepared to have Jing delivered back to Liao proper. As the jailers and he stopped at Chenqiao (陳橋, in modern Xinxiang) one night, he found a time when the jailers were not watching him. He then strangled himself to death with his hands. After Liao eventually withdrew from Later Jin's former territory, and the territory was taken over by a new state of Later Han founded by the former Later Jin general Liu Zhiyuan, Jing was given posthumous honors.

== Notes and references ==
- Old History of the Five Dynasties, vol. 88.
- New History of the Five Dynasties, vol. 29.
- Zizhi Tongjian, vols. 280, 283, 284, 285, 286.
