= Empress Feng (Later Jin) =

Empress Feng (馮皇后, personal name unknown) was the empress and second wife of Shi Chonggui, the second and final emperor of the Chinese Five Dynasties and Ten Kingdoms Period state Later Jin. She was previously the wife of his adoptive brother (biological uncle) Shi Chongyin (石重胤).

== Background and marriage to Shi Chongyin ==
It is not known when the future Empress Feng was born. Her family was from Ding Prefecture (定州, in modern Baoding, Hebei), but it is (based on her father's career) unclear whether she was born there. Her father Feng Meng (馮濛) was the liaison officer for Yiwu Circuit (義武, headquartered at Ding) to the Later Tang court early during the reign of the second Later Tang emperor Li Siyuan. Feng Meng was described to be intelligent but wicked, and he gained the favor of Li Siyuan's powerful chief of staff An Chonghui, and was eventually promoted to be the deputy defender of Yedu (鄴都, in modern Handan, Hebei). When Li Siyuan's son-in-law Shi Jingtang later became the defender of Yedu in 928, he became friendly with Feng Meng, and decided to take Feng Meng's daughter as the wife for his younger brother Shi Chongyin, whom he had adopted as a son. Shi Chongyin died early, however, and Lady Feng became widowed. (Two of Shi Jingtang's sons were executed by Later Tang's final emperor Li Congke (Li Siyuan's adoptive son) when Shi Jingtang rebelled against Li Congke in 936, but the historical sources are in discord as to the identities of those two sons. The Old History of the Five Dynasties and the New History of the Five Dynasties gave their identities as Shi Chongyin and Shi Chongying (石重英), thus indicating that was when Shi Chongyin was killed, widowing Lady Feng; the Zizhi Tongjian gave their identities as Shi Chongyin (石重殷, note different character) and Shi Chongyi (石重裔), which, if accurate, makes it unclear when Lady Feng was widowed.) Regardless, after Shi Jingtang subsequently (with aid from Later Tang's northern neighbor Khitan Empire's Emperor Taizong) destroyed Later Tang and took over its territory as the emperor of a new state of Later Jin, Shi Chongyin was posthumously created the Prince of Shan, and Lady Feng received the title of Lady of Wu.

== As Shi Chonggui's wife and empress ==
After Lady Feng was widowed, her adoptive brother-in-law Shi Chonggui (Shi Jingtang's biological nephew, whom he also adopted as a son) became infatuated with her. (Shi Chonggui himself had been widowed after the death of his first wife Lady Zhang, who had carried the title of Lady of Wei.) Sometime after Shi Jingtang died in 942, he married her — even before Shi Jingtang was buried, displeasing Shi Jingtang's wife Empress Dowager Li, but who could do nothing about it — even though he claimed to have married her with the empress dowager's agreement. In 943, he created her empress.

After Empress Feng became empress, she was substantially involved in Shi Chonggui's governance. Further, her older brother Feng Yu was elevated to be an imperial scholar at Duanming Hall (端明殿) and the deputy minister of census (戶部侍郎, Hubu Shilang) and became an important advisor to Shi. (Feng Yu would eventually become chief of staff (Shumishi) and chancellor, and become extremely powerful.) It was not stated whether Empress Feng had any part in Shi's major policy shift of turning against the Khitan (whose state had been renamed Liao by that point).

== After Later Jin's destruction ==
In late 946, Liao's Emperor Taizong, after defeating and forcing the surrender of an army under the command of Shi Chonggui's uncle by marriage Du Wei, approached the Later Jin capital Kaifeng. Shi, finding the situation hopeless, surrendered to the Liao (and former Later Jin) general Zhang Yanze, whom Emperor Taizong had sent as an advance commander into Kaifeng first. Zhang quickly moved Shi and his family (including Empress Feng and Empress Dowager Li) out of the palace. In spring 947, Emperor Taizong sent Shi and his family into exile, into desolate lands deep in Liao territory. During the journey, his train was poorly supplied, such that his servants and ladies in waiting had to resort to foraging to survive. Shi regretted not committing suicide, and Empress Feng tried to obtain poison so that both of them could do so, but was unable to.

The last Chinese traditional historical record to Empress Feng indicated that as of the Xiande era (954-962) of the subsequent Later Zhou state, there were people returning from Liao who stated that Shi Chonggui and Empress Feng were still living and were in good condition, but that most of their servants had either died or fled. It is not known when she died. However, the modernly-discovered tombstone of Shi Chonggui, which indicated that he died in 974, also implied that she had predeceased him.

== Notes and references ==
- New History of the Five Dynasties, vol. 17.
- Zizhi Tongjian, vols. 283, 285, 286, 289.

Preceded by Empress Li	Empress of Later Jin; 942–947	Succeeded by None (dynasty destroyed)
Preceded by Empress Li	Empress of China (Central); 942–947	Succeeded by Empress Li of Later Han
Preceded by Empress Zhang of Min	Empress of China (Northeastern Fujian); 945–947; With: Empress Zhong of Southern Tang 945–946	Succeeded by Queen Sun Taizhen of Wuyue
