= 951 =

Calendar year

951 in various calendars
Gregorian calendar	951; CMLI
Ab urbe condita	1704
Armenian calendar	400; ԹՎ Ն
Assyrian calendar	5701
Balinese saka calendar	872–873
Bengali calendar	357–358
Berber calendar	1901
Buddhist calendar	1495
Burmese calendar	313
Byzantine calendar	6459–6460
Chinese calendar	庚戌年 (Metal Dog); 3648 or 3441 — to — 辛亥年 (Metal Pig); 3649 or 3442
Coptic calendar	667–668
Discordian calendar	2117
Ethiopian calendar	943–944
Hebrew calendar	4711–4712
- Hindu calendars
Vikram Samvat	1007–1008
Shaka Samvat	872–873
Kali Yuga	4051–4052
Holocene calendar	10951
Iranian calendar	329–330
Islamic calendar	339–340
Japanese calendar	Tenryaku 5 (天暦５年)
Javanese calendar	851–852
Julian calendar	951; CMLI
Korean calendar	3284
Minguo calendar	961 before ROC 民前961年
Nanakshahi calendar	−517
Seleucid era	1262/1263 AG
Thai solar calendar	1493–1494
Tibetan calendar	ལྕགས་ཕོ་ཁྱི་ལོ་ (male Iron-Dog); 1077 or 696 or −76 — to — ལྕགས་མོ་ཕག་ལོ་ (female Iron-Boar); 1078 or 697 or −75

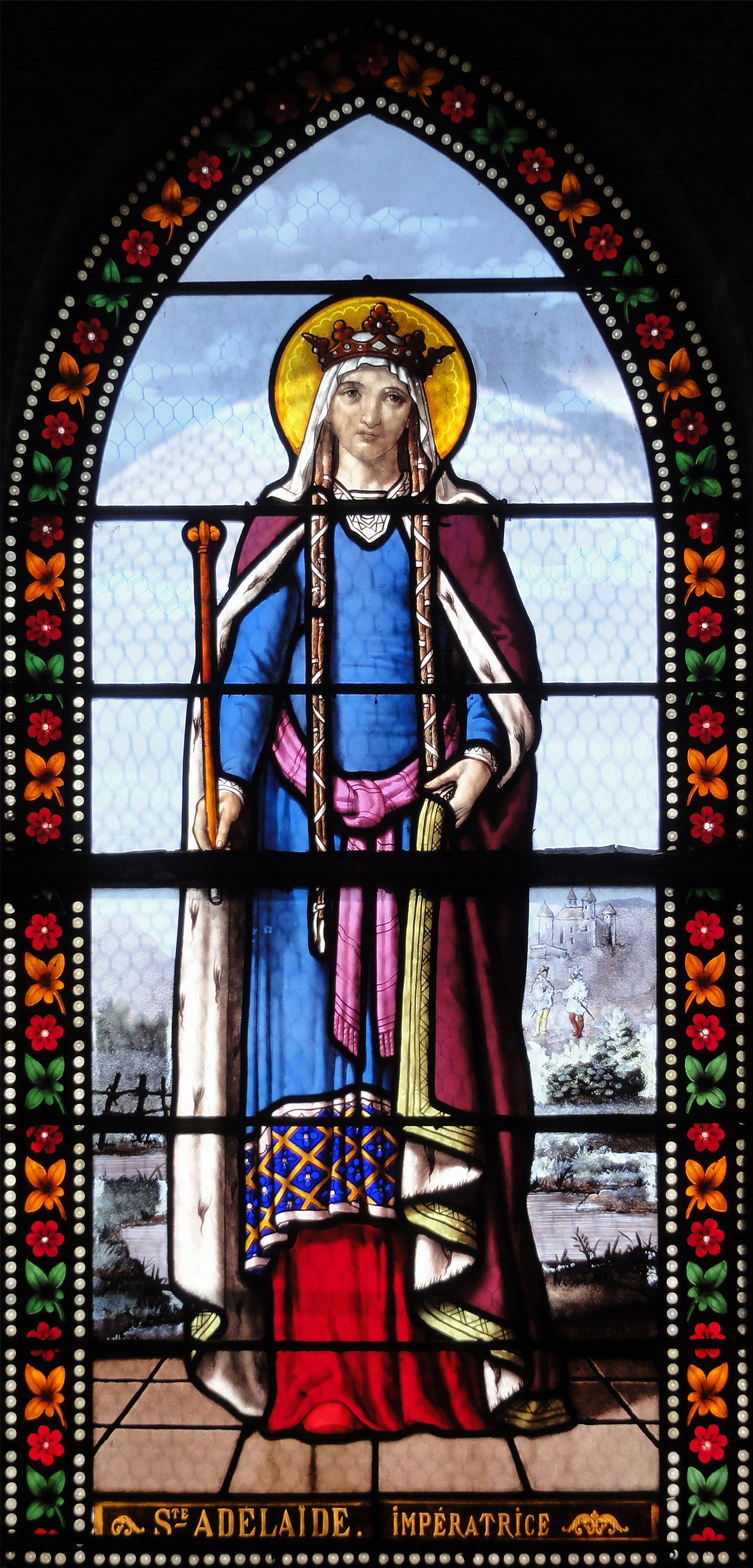
Queen Adelaide of Italy (931–999)

Year 951 (CMLI) was a common year starting on Wednesday of the Julian calendar.

== Events ==
=== By place ===
==== Europe ====
- King Berengar II of Italy seizes Liguria, with help from the feudal lord Oberto I. He reorganizes the territories south of the Po River, dividing them into three new marches (frontier districts), named after their respective margraves: the Marca Aleramica, the Marca Arduinica, and the Marca Obertenga. The last division consists of Lombardy with the cities of Genoa, Luni, Tortona, Parma, and Piacenza. Berengar forces Adelaide, the widow of Lothair II, to marry his son Adalbert. However, she fiercely refuses and Berengar has her imprisoned at Garda Castle. With the help of Count Adalbert Atto of Canossa Adelaide manages to escape.
- Fall – King Otto I crosses the Brenner Pass and takes his army into Italy. He is accompanied by his brothers, Henry I (duke of Bavaria), Bruno I, and Conrad the Red (duke of Lotharingia). Otto faces no opposition and they arrive in Pavia. Berengar II has departed the day before and entrenched himself in San Marino. Otto receives the homage of the Italian nobility, marries Adelaide, and declares himself King of the Lombards.
- Otto I dispatches an embassy to Rome to apply for an imperial coronation with Pope Agapetus II – but Prince Alberic II makes it clear that this is not possible (afraid of Otto's growing power), and opposes the request.

==== China ====
- February 9 – The Northern Han Kingdom is founded by Liu Chong (called Shizu) in modern-day Shanxi who restores the diplomatic relations with the Khitans. Northern Han becomes a protectorate of the Liao dynasty.
- February 13 – Guo Wei, a court official, leads a military coup and declares himself emperor of the new Later Zhou. The 19-year-old Emperor Liu Chengyou is killed after a 3-year reign, ending the short-lived Later Han.
- Emperor Shi Zong successfully repels a Chinese advance from the south. In October he is killed by a rebellious nephew after a three year reign. Shi Zong is succeeded by his uncle Mu Zong as ruler of the Liao dynasty.
- November 16 – Emperor Li Jing sends a Southern Tang expeditionary force (10,000 men) under Bian Hao to conquer Chu. Li Jing removes the ruling family to his own capital in Nanjing, ending the Chu Kingdom.

Africa

- Abd ar-Rahman III consolidated his grip on North Africa by occupying Tangier in 951.
- Abd ar-Rahman III signs a peace in 951 with the new king of León, Ordoño III, in order to have a free hand against the Fatimids, whose ships are harassing the caliphal fleet in the Mediterranean and had even launched an assault against Almeria. Abd ar-Rahman's force, led by prime minister Ahmad ibn Said, besieges the Fatimid port of Tunis, which purchases its safety through a huge sum.

== Births ==
- Abu Talib Yahya, Muslim imam of the Zaydiyyah sect (d. 1033)
- Gaston II Centule, viscount of Béarn (approximate date)
- Gregory of Narek, Armenian monk and theologian (d. 1003)
- Henry II (the Wrangler), duke of Bavaria (d. 995)
- Ibn al-Kattani, Moorish scholar and physician (d. 1029)
- Liu Chenggui, official of the Song dynasty (d. 1016)
- Romuald, founder of the Camaldolese order (approximate date)
- Sidi Mahrez, Muslim scholar and 'protector' (wali) (d. 1022)
- Zhao Dezhao (Yi of Yan), prince of the Song dynasty (d. 979)

== Deaths ==
- January 1 – Ramiro II, king of León and Galicia
- January 2
  - Liu Chengyou, emperor of Later Han (b. 931)
  - Su Fengji, Chinese official and chancellor
- January 25 – Ma Xiguang, ruler of Chu (Ten Kingdoms)
- February 24 – Liu Yun, Chinese governor (jiedushi)
- March 12 – Ælfheah the Bald, bishop of Winchester
- June 7 – Lu Wenji, Chinese chancellor (b. 876)
- June 8 – Zhao Ying, Chinese chancellor (b. 885)
- October 7
  - Shi Zong, emperor of the Liao dynasty (b. 919)
  - Xiao, Chinese Khitan empress dowager
  - Zhen, Chinese Khitan empress consort
- October 8 – Xiao Sagezhi, Chinese Khitan empress
- Cadwgan ab Owain, king of Glywysing (Wales)
- Cennétig mac Lorcáin, king of Tuadmumu (Ireland)
- Gofraid mac Sitriuc, Viking king of Dublin (Ireland)
- Wang Chuhui, Chinese chief of staff (shumishi)
- Wang Yanzheng, emperor of Min (approximate date)
