= October 7 =

October 7 this year in various calendars
- Wednesday, 7 October 2026
Akan	Monowukuo
Armenian	19 Sahmi 1476
Aztec	Izcalli 5, 11 Tecpatl
Babylonian	24 Ululu, 2337 SE
Balinese pawukon	Menga, Kajeng, Menala, Paing, Maulu, Buda of Wayang, Uma, Gigis, Manusa
Bengali	22 Ashshin, BS 1433
Chinese	Yang Wood Tiger・Three Stars Mansion; Fire Horse Year, Month 8, Day 27 (Qiufen, 1 day until Hanlu)
Common Era	7 October 2026 CE
Coptic	27 Thout, AM 1743
Egyptian	24 Mechir, 2775 NE
Ethiopian	27 Maskaram, 2019 Amätä Məhrät
French Republican	Décade II, Quintidi de Vendémiaire de l'Année 235 de la République
Gregorian	7 October, AD 2026
Hebrew	26 Tishrei, AM 5787
Hindu	Maghā・Sādhya; Solar: 21 Āśvina, 1948 SE; Lunisolar: Dvādaśī, Kṛishna pakṣa of Bhādrapada, 2083 VE; Rāudra・5127 KY・1,872,855
Icelandic	Miðvikudagur, 14 Haustmánuður 2026
Islamic	24 Rabi' al-thani, AH 1448 (using tabular method)
ISO week date	2026-W41-3
Japanese	27 Hazuki, Reiwa 8 (Shūbun, 1 day until Kanro)
Julian	24 September, AD 2026 (AM 7534)
Julian day	2461321
Korean	27 Dakdal, 4359 DE
Maya	13.0.13.17.18; 11 Yax, 11 Etznab
Roman	ante diem VIII Kalendas Octobres, MMDCCLXXIX AUC
Solar Hijri	15 Mehr, SH 1405
Tibetan	27 khrums, me pho rta 2153 or 1772 or 1000

<<	October					>>
Su	Mo	Tu	We	Th	Fr	Sa
				1	2	3
4	5	6	7	8	9	10
11	12	13	14	15	16	17
18	19	20	21	22	23	24
25	26	27	28	29	30	31
2026

October 7 in recent years
2026 (Wednesday)
2025 (Tuesday)
2024 (Monday)
2023 (Saturday)
2022 (Friday)
2021 (Thursday)
2020 (Wednesday)
2019 (Monday)
2018 (Sunday)
2017 (Saturday)

October 7 is the 280th day of the year (281st in leap years) in the Gregorian calendar; 85 days remain until the end of the year.

== Events ==
=== Pre-1600 ===
- 3761 BC – The epoch reference date (start) of the modern Hebrew calendar.
- 1130 – Fatimid Caliph al-Amir is assassinated.
- 1403 – Venetian–Genoese wars: The Genoese fleet under a French admiral is defeated by a Venetian fleet at the Battle of Modon.
- 1477 – Uppsala University is inaugurated after receiving its corporate rights from Pope Sixtus IV in February the same year.
- 1513 – War of the League of Cambrai: Spain defeats Venice.
- 1571 – The Battle of Lepanto is fought, and the Ottoman Navy suffers its first defeat.

=== 1601–1900 ===
- 1691 – The charter for the Province of Massachusetts Bay is issued.
- 1763 – King George III issues the Royal Proclamation of 1763, closing Indigenous lands in North America north and west of the Alleghenies to white settlements.
- 1777 – American Revolutionary War: The Americans defeat British forces under general John Burgoyne in the Second Battle of Saratoga, also known as the Battle of Bemis Heights, compelling Burgoyne's eventual surrender.
- 1780 – American Revolutionary War: American militia defeat royalist irregulars led by British major Patrick Ferguson at the Battle of Kings Mountain in South Carolina, often regarded as the turning point in the war's Southern theater.
- 1800 – French corsair Robert Surcouf, commander of the 18-gun ship La Confiance, captures the British 38-gun Kent.
- 1826 – Imperial Russia and the Ottoman Empire sign the Akkerman Convention, under which the Ottomans accept Russian territorial demands in the Balkans, Caucasus and the Danubian river basin.
- 1826 – The Granite Railway begins operations as the first chartered railway in the U.S.
- 1828 – Morea expedition: The city of Patras, Greece, is liberated by the French expeditionary force.
- 1840 – Willem II becomes King of the Netherlands.
- 1864 – American Civil War: A US Navy ship captures a Confederate raider in a Brazilian seaport.
- 1868 – Cornell University holds opening day ceremonies; initial student enrollment is 412, the highest at any American university to that date.
- 1870 – Franco-Prussian War: Léon Gambetta escapes the siege of Paris in a hot-air balloon.
- 1879 – Germany and Austria-Hungary sign the "Twofold Covenant" and create the Dual Alliance.

=== 1901–present ===
- 1912 – The Helsinki Stock Exchange sees its first transaction.
- 1913 – Ford Motor Company introduces the first moving vehicle assembly line.
- 1916 – Georgia Tech defeats Cumberland University 222–0 in the most lopsided college football game in American history.
- 1919 – KLM, the flag carrier of the Netherlands, is founded. It is the oldest airline still operating under its original name.
- 1924 – Andreas Michalakopoulos becomes prime minister of Greece for a short period of time.
- 1929 – Photius II becomes Ecumenical Patriarch of Constantinople.
- 1940 – World War II: The McCollum memo proposes bringing the United States into the war in Europe by provoking the Japanese to attack the United States.
- 1944 – World War II: The Sonderkommando Revolt in Auschwitz occurs with an uprising of prisoners (especially the Sonderkommando) at the Auschwitz concentration camp.
- 1949 – The communist German Democratic Republic (East Germany) is formed.
- 1950 – Mother Teresa establishes the Missionaries of Charity.
- 1958 – The 1958 Pakistani coup d'état inaugurates a prolonged period of military rule.
- 1958 – The U.S. crewed space-flight project is renamed to Project Mercury.
- 1959 – The Soviet probe Luna 3 transmits the first-ever photographs of the far side of the Moon.
- 1961 – A Douglas Dakota IV operated by Derby Aviation (later renamed to British Midland International) crashes in Canigó, France, killing 34 people.
- 1963 – President Kennedy signs the ratification of the Partial Nuclear Test Ban Treaty.
- 1963 – Buddhist crisis: Amid worsening relations, outspoken South Vietnamese First Lady Madame Ngo Dinh Nhu arrives in the US for a speaking tour, continuing a flurry of attacks on the Kennedy administration.
- 1977 – The Fourth Soviet Constitution is adopted.
- 1978 – Aeroflot Flight 1080 crashes after takeoff from Koltsovo International Airport, killing 38.
- 1979 – Swissair Flight 316 crashes at Ellinikon International Airport in Athens, Greece, killing 14.
- 1985 – The Mameyes landslide kills almost 200 people in Puerto Rico.
- 1985 – Four men from the Palestine Liberation Front hijack the MS Achille Lauro off the coast of Egypt.
- 1987 – Sikh nationalists declare the independence of Khalistan from India; it is not internationally recognized.
- 1988 – A hunter discovers three gray whales trapped under the ice near Alaska; the situation becomes a multinational effort to free the whales.
- 1991 – Croatian War of Independence: Bombing of the Banski Dvori in Zagreb, Croatia.
- 1993 – The flood of '93 ends at St. Louis, Missouri, 103 days after it began, as the Mississippi River falls below flood stage.
- 2000 – Israeli-Palestinian conflict: Hezbollah militants capture three Israeli Defense Force soldiers in a cross-border raid.
- 2001 – The U.S. invasion of Afghanistan begins with an air assault and covert operations on the ground, starting the longest war in American history.
- 2002 – The Space Shuttle Atlantis launches on STS-112 to continue assembly of the International Space Station.
- 2004 – Three bombs explode at Taba and Nuweiba in the Sinai Peninsula, Egypt, killing 34.
- 2007 – The battle of Mirali begins in which the Pakistan Armed Forces and Taliban militias clash for four days.
- 2008 – Asteroid 2008 TC3 impacts the Earth over Sudan, the first time an asteroid impact is detected prior to its entry into Earth's atmosphere.
- 2008 – Qantas Flight 72 experiences an in-flight upset near Exmouth, Western Australia, Australia, injuring 112.
- 2016 – In the wake of Hurricane Matthew, the death toll rises to over 800.
- 2022 – Ten people are killed and eight are injured in an explosion at a petrol station in Creeslough, Ireland.
- 2022 – Ales Bialiatski, along with two organisations, Memorial and Center for Civil Liberties, are awarded the Nobel Peace Prize.
- 2023 – Hamas and several other Palestinian militant groups launch an attack into Israel, which results in the deaths of around 1,200, mostly civilians, and the taking of 251 hostages, including civilians and soldiers.

== Births ==
=== Pre-1600 ===
- 14 BC – Drusus Julius Caesar, Roman politician (died 23 AD)
- 1301 – Grand Prince Aleksandr Mikhailovich of Tver (died 1339)
- 1409 – Elizabeth of Luxembourg (died 1442)
- 1471 – Frederick I of Denmark (died 1533)
- 1474 – Bernhard III, Margrave of Baden-Baden (died 1536)
- 1482 – Ernest, Margrave of Baden-Durlach (died 1553)
- 1573 – William Laud, English archbishop and academic (died 1645)
- 1576 – John Marston, English poet and playwright (died 1634)
- 1586 – Isaac Massa, Dutch diplomat (died 1643)
- 1589 – Archduchess Maria Maddalena of Austria (died 1631)
- 1591 – Pierre Le Muet, French architect (died 1669)
- 1597 – Captain John Underhill, English settler and soldier (died 1672)

=== 1601–1900 ===
- 1635 – Roger de Piles, French painter (died 1709)
- 1713 – Granville Elliott, English general (died 1759)
- 1728 – Caesar Rodney, American soldier, lawyer, and politician, 4th Governor of Delaware (died 1784)
- 1744 – Sergey Vyazmitinov, Russian general and politician, War Governor of Saint Petersburg (died 1819)
- 1746 – William Billings, American composer and educator (died 1800)
- 1748 – Charles XIII of Sweden (died 1818)
- 1769 – Solomon Sibley, American lawyer, jurist, and politician, 1st Mayor of Detroit (died 1846)
- 1786 – Louis-Joseph Papineau, Canadian lawyer and politician (died 1871)
- 1798 – Jean-Baptiste Vuillaume, French instrument maker and businessman (died 1875)
- 1799 – Mills Darden, one of the largest men ever in human history (died 1857)
- 1819 – Ann Eliza Smith, American author and patriot (died 1905)
- 1821 – Richard H. Anderson, American general (died 1879)
- 1832 – Charles Crozat Converse, American lawyer and composer (died 1918)
- 1835 – Felix Draeseke, German composer and educator (died 1913)
- 1836 – Henri Elzéar Taschereau, Canadian scholar and jurist, 4th Chief Justice of Canada (died 1911)
- 1841 – Nicholas I of Montenegro (died 1921)
- 1849 – James Whitcomb Riley, American poet and author (died 1916)
- 1860 – Leonidas Paraskevopoulos, Greek general and politician (died 1936)
- 1866 – Wlodimir Ledóchowski, Polish-Austrian religious leader, 26th Superior General of the Society of Jesus (died 1942)
- 1870 – Uncle Dave Macon, American old-time country banjo player, singer-songwriter, and comedian (died 1952)
- 1876 – Louis Tancred, South African cricketer (died 1934)
- 1879 – Joe Hill, Swedish-born American labor activist and poet (died 1915)
- 1881 – Mikhail Drozdovsky, Ukrainian-Russian general (died 1918)
- 1884 – Harold Geiger, American lieutenant and pilot (died 1927)
- 1885 – Niels Bohr, Danish physicist and philosopher, Nobel Prize laureate (died 1962)
- 1885 – Claud Ashton Jones, American admiral, Medal of Honor recipient (died 1948)
- 1887 – Jack Russell, English cricketer and coach (died 1961)
- 1888 – Henry A. Wallace, American agronomist and politician, 33rd Vice President of the United States (died 1965)
- 1888 – Edna Meade Colson, American educator and activist (died 1985)
- 1889 – Robert Z. Leonard, American actor, director, producer, and screenwriter (died 1968)
- 1892 – Dwain Esper, American director and producer (died 1982)
- 1893 – Alice Dalgliesh, Trinidadian-American author and publisher (died 1979)
- 1895 – Maurice Grevisse, Belgian linguist and author (died 1980)
- 1896 – Paulino Alcántara, Spanish Filipino football player and manager (died 1964)
- 1897 – Elijah Muhammad, American religious leader (died 1975)
- 1897 – Thakin Mya, Burmese lawyer and politician (died 1947)
- 1900 – Heinrich Himmler, Nazi politician, head of the SS and senior official responsible for the Holocaust (died 1945)

=== 1901–present ===
- 1901 – Frank Boucher, Canadian ice hockey player and executive (died 1977)
- 1904 – Armando Castellazzi, Italian footballer and coach (died 1968)
- 1904 – Chuck Klein, American baseball player (died 1958)
- 1905 – Andy Devine, American actor (died 1977)
- 1906 – James E. Webb, American government official (Administrator of NASA, 1961-68, Space Telescope named after him) (died 1992)
- 1907 – Helen MacInnes, Scottish-American librarian and author (died 1985)
- 1909 – Anni Blomqvist, Finnish author (died 1990)
- 1909 – Shura Cherkassky, Ukrainian-American pianist and educator (died 1995)
- 1909 – Erastus Corning 2nd, American soldier and politician, 72nd Mayor of Albany (died 1983)
- 1911 – Jo Jones, American jazz drummer, and percussionist (Count Basie) (died 1985)
- 1912 – Fernando Belaúnde Terry, Peruvian architect and politician, President of Peru (died 2002)
- 1912 – Peter Walker, English racing driver (died 1984)
- 1913 – Simon Carmiggelt, Dutch journalist and author (died 1987)
- 1913 – Raimond Valgre, Estonian pianist, guitarist, and composer (died 1949)
- 1914 – Begum Akhtar, Indian actress (died 1974)
- 1914 – Sarah Churchill, English actress (died 1982)
- 1914 – Alfred Drake, American actor and singer (died 1992)
- 1917 – June Allyson, American actress (died 2006)
- 1919 – Henriette Avram, American computer scientist and academic (died 2006)
- 1919 – Zelman Cowen, Australian academic and politician, 19th Governor-General of Australia (died 2011)
- 1919 – Georges Duby, French historian and author (died 1996)
- 1920 – Georg Leber, German soldier and politician, German Federal Minister of Defence (died 2012)
- 1920 – Jack Rowley, English footballer and manager (died 1998)
- 1921 – Raymond Goethals, Belgian footballer and coach (died 2004)
- 1923 – Irma Grese, German SS officer (died 1945)
- 1923 – Břetislav Pojar, Czech animator and director (died 2012)
- 1923 – Jean-Paul Riopelle, Canadian painter and sculptor (died 2002)
- 1926 – Alex Groza, American basketball player (died 1995)
- 1927 – Al Martino, American singer and actor (died 2009)
- 1927 – R. D. Laing, Scottish psychiatrist and author (died 1989)
- 1927 – Demetrio González, Spanish-Mexican film actor and singer (died 2015)
- 1928 – José Messias, Brazilian composer, singer, writer, host and critic (died 2015)
- 1928 – Ali Kafi, Algerian politician (died 2013)
- 1928 – Lorna Wing, English autism researcher (died 2014)
- 1929 – Graeme Ferguson, Canadian director and producer, co-founded the IMAX Corporation (died 2021)
- 1931 – Cotton Fitzsimmons, American basketball player and coach (died 2004)
- 1931 – R. Sivagurunathan, Sri Lankan journalist, lawyer, and academic (died 2003)
- 1931 – Desmond Tutu, South African archbishop and activist, Nobel Prize laureate (died 2021)
- 1932 – Joannes Gijsen, Dutch bishop (died 2013)
- 1934 – Amiri Baraka, American poet, playwright, and academic (died 2014)
- 1934 – Ulrike Meinhof, German left-wing militant, co-founder of the Red Army Faction, journalist (died 1976)
- 1934 – Willie Naulls, American basketball player (died 2018)
- 1935 – Thomas Keneally, Australian novelist, playwright, and essayist
- 1937 – Christopher Booker, English journalist and author (died 2019)
- 1937 – Maria Szyszkowska, Polish academic and politician
- 1938 – Yvonne Brewster, Jamaican actress and theatre director
- 1938 – Ann Jones, English tennis player and sportscaster
- 1939 – John Hopcroft, American computer scientist and author
- 1939 – Clive James, Australian television host, author, and critic (died 2019)
- 1939 – Harry Kroto, English chemist and academic, Nobel Prize laureate (died 2016)
- 1939 – Laurent Monsengwo Pasinya, Congolese cardinal (died 2021)
- 1942 – Joy Behar, American talk show host, comedian and television personality
- 1943 – José Cardenal, Cuban baseball player and coach
- 1943 – Oliver North, American colonel, journalist, and author
- 1944 – Judee Sill, American singer-songwriter and musician (died 1979)
- 1944 – Donald Tsang, Chinese civil servant and politician, 2nd Chief Executive of Hong Kong
- 1945 – Kevin Godley, English singer-songwriter and director
- 1945 – David Wallace, Scottish physicist and academic
- 1946 – John Brass, Australian rugby player and coach
- 1946 – Catharine MacKinnon, American lawyer, activist, and author
- 1946 – Anita Shreve, American writer, Wrote 'The Weight of Water' (died 2018)
- 1947 – Chris Bambridge, Australian footballer and referee
- 1947 – Jill Larson, American actress
- 1948 – Diane Ackerman, American poet and essayist
- 1949 – Alice Walton, American billionaire, heiress to the Walmart fortune
- 1950 – Dick Jauron, American football player and coach (died 2025)
- 1950 – Jakaya Kikwete, Tanzanian colonel, economist, and politician, 4th President of Tanzania
- 1951 – Enki Bilal, French comic book creator, comics artist and film director
- 1951 – John Mellencamp, American singer-songwriter, guitarist, and actor
- 1952 – Mary Badham, American actress
- 1952 – Vladimir Putin, Russian colonel and politician, 4th President of Russia
- 1952 – Jacques Richard, Canadian ice hockey player (died 2002)
- 1952 – Graham Yallop, Australian cricketer
- 1953 – Linda Griffiths, Canadian actress and playwright (died 2014)
- 1953 – Tico Torres, American drummer
- 1955 – Ralph Johnson, American computer scientist and author
- 1955 – Bill Henson, Australian photographer
- 1955 – Yo-Yo Ma, French-American cellist and educator
- 1956 – Steve Bainbridge, English rugby player
- 1957 – Michael W. Smith, American singer-songwriter and actor
- 1957 – Jayne Torvill, English figure skater
- 1959 – Dylan Baker, American actor
- 1959 – Simon Cowell, English businessman and record producer
- 1959 – Lourdes Flores, Peruvian lawyer and politician
- 1960 – Kevin Boyle, American historian and author
- 1961 – Brian Mannix, Australian singer-songwriter
- 1962 – Dave Bronconnier, Canadian businessman and politician, 35th Mayor of Calgary
- 1964 – Sam Brown, English singer-songwriter, musician, and record producer
- 1964 – Dan Savage, American LGBT rights activist, journalist and television producer
- 1964 – Paul Stewart, English footballer
- 1965 – Genji Hashimoto, Japanese racing driver
- 1965 – Kumiko Watanabe, Japanese voice actress
- 1966 – Sherman Alexie, American novelist, short story writer, poet, and filmmaker
- 1966 – Marco Beltrami, Italian-American composer and conductor
- 1967 – Peter Baker, English golfer
- 1967 – Toni Braxton, American singer-songwriter, producer, and actress
- 1967 – María Corina Machado, Venezuelan Nobel Prize Laureate
- 1968 – Thom Yorke, English singer-songwriter and guitarist
- 1969 – Malia Hosaka, American wrestler
- 1970 – Nicole Ari Parker, American actress
- 1971 – Daniel Boucher, Canadian singer and actor
- 1973 – Dida, Brazilian footballer
- 1973 – Sami Hyypiä, Finnish footballer and manager
- 1973 – Grigol Mgaloblishvili, Georgian politician and diplomat, 7th Prime Minister of Georgia
- 1974 – Rune Glifberg, Danish skateboarder
- 1974 – Allison Munn, American actress
- 1974 – Ruslan Nigmatullin, Russian footballer
- 1974 – Charlotte Perrelli, Swedish singer
- 1975 – Giorgos Karadimos, Greek singer-songwriter and guitarist
- 1975 – Damian Kulash, American singer-songwriter and guitarist
- 1975 – Tim Minchin, English-Australian comedian, actor, and singer
- 1975 – Rhyno, American wrestler
- 1976 – Marc Coma, Spanish motorcycle racer
- 1976 – Taylor Hicks, American singer-songwriter
- 1976 – Gilberto Silva, Brazilian footballer
- 1976 – Santiago Solari, Argentinian footballer and manager
- 1977 – Antoine Revoy, French comics writer and illustrator
- 1978 – Alison Balsom, English trumpet player and educator
- 1978 – Alesha Dixon, English singer-songwriter and dancer
- 1978 – Zaheer Khan, Indian cricketer
- 1978 – Omar Benson Miller, American actor
- 1979 – Simona Amânar, Romanian gymnast
- 1979 – Shawn Ashmore, Canadian actor
- 1982 – Madjid Bougherra, Algerian footballer
- 1982 – Jermain Defoe, English footballer
- 1982 – Jake McLaughlin, American actor
- 1982 – Li Yundi, Chinese pianist
- 1983 – Dwayne Bravo, Trinidadian cricketer
- 1983 – Flying Lotus, American rapper, DJ, and producer
- 1984 – Salman Butt, Pakistani cricketer
- 1984 – Toma Ikuta, Japanese actor and singer
- 1984 – Simon Poulsen, Danish footballer
- 1985 – Evan Longoria, American baseball player
- 1986 – Lee Nguyen, American soccer player
- 1986 – Gunnar Nielsen, Faroese footballer
- 1986 – Bree Olson, American actress, model, and former pornographic actress
- 1986 – A. J. Price, American basketball player
- 1986 – Holland Roden, American actress
- 1986 – Amy Satterthwaite, New Zealand cricketer
- 1986 – Amber Stevens West, American actress
- 1987 – Jeremy Brockie, New Zealand footballer
- 1987 – Alex Cobb, American baseball player
- 1987 – Damion James, American basketball player
- 1988 – Diego da Silva Costa, Brazilian footballer
- 1990 – Sebastián Coates, Uruguayan footballer
- 1991 – Oscar Fantenberg, Swedish ice hockey player
- 1991 – Mike Foltynewicz, American baseball player
- 1991 – Nicole Jung, American singer
- 1991 – Lay Zhang, Chinese singer-songwriter and actor
- 1992 – Mookie Betts, American baseball player
- 1993 – Nic Stauskas, Canadian basketball player
- 1995 – Lyndon Dykes, Australian professional footballer
- 1995 – Mathias Dyngeland, Norwegian footballer
- 1995 – Bram van Vlerken, Dutch footballer
- 1996 – Lewis Capaldi, Scottish singer-songwriter
- 1996 – Choi Jeong, South Korean Go player
- 1996 – Guglielmo Vicario, Italian footballer
- 1997 – Kira Kosarin, American actress and singer
- 1997 – Nicole Maines, American actress, writer, and activist
- 1998 – Ryan Trahan, American YouTuber
- 1999 – Ferdi Kadıoğlu, Turkish footballer
- 2001 – Princess Senate Seeiso, Princess of Lesotho
- 2002 – Joaquín Panichelli, Argentine footballer

== Deaths ==
=== Pre-1600 ===
- 336 – Mark, pope of the Catholic Church
- 858 – Montoku, Japanese emperor (born 826)
- 929 – Charles the Simple, French king (born 879)
- 950 – Li, Chinese empress consort
- 951 – Shi Zong, emperor of the Liao Dynasty (born 919)
- 951 – Xiao, Chinese Khitan empress dowager
- 951 – Zhen, Chinese Khitan empress consort
- 988 – Qian Chu, king of Wuyue (born 929)
- 1242 – Juntoku, Japanese emperor (born 1197)
- 1259 – Ezzelino III da Romano, Italian ruler
- 1363 – Eleanor de Bohun, English noblewoman (born 1304)
- 1368 – Lionel of Antwerp, 1st Duke of Clarence, Belgian-English politician (born 1338)
- 1461 – Jean Poton de Xaintrailles, follower of Joan of Arc (born c. 1390)
- 1468 – Sigismondo Pandolfo Malatesta, Italian nobleman (born 1417)
- 1553 – Cristóbal de Morales, Spanish composer (born 1500)
- 1571 – Sufi Ali Pasha, Ottoman soldier and politician, Ottoman Governor of Egypt
- 1571 – Dorothea of Saxe-Lauenburg, Danish queen consort of Christian III of Denmark (born 1511)
- 1577 – George Gascoigne, English soldier, courtier, and poet (born 1535)

=== 1601–1900 ===
- 1612 – Giovanni Battista Guarini, Italian poet, playwright, and diplomat (born 1538)
- 1620 – Stanisław Żółkiewski, Polish-Lithuanian commander (born 1547)
- 1637 – Victor Amadeus I, duke of Savoy (born 1587)
- 1651 – Jacques Sirmond, French scholar (born 1559)
- 1653 – Fausto Poli, Italian cardinal (born 1581)
- 1708 – Guru Gobind Singh, Indian 10th Sikh guru (born 1666)
- 1747 – Giulia Lama, Italian painter (born 1681)
- 1772 – John Woolman, American preacher and abolitionist (born 1720)
- 1787 – Henry Muhlenberg, German-American pastor and missionary (born 1711)
- 1792 – George Mason, American lawyer and politician (born 1725)
- 1793 – Wills Hill, 1st Marquess of Downshire, English politician, President of the Board of Trade (born 1718)
- 1796 – Thomas Reid, Scottish mathematician and philosopher (born 1710)
- 1849 – Edgar Allan Poe, American short story writer, poet, and critic (born 1809)
- 1884 – Bernard Petitjean, French Roman Catholic missionary to Japan (born 1829)
- 1894 – Oliver Wendell Holmes Sr., American physician, author, and poet (born 1809)

=== 1901–present ===
- 1903 – Rudolf Lipschitz, German mathematician and academic (born 1832)
- 1904 – Isabella Bird, English historian and explorer (born 1831)
- 1906 – Honoré Beaugrand, Canadian journalist and politician, 18th Mayor of Montreal (born 1848)
- 1911 – John Hughlings Jackson, English neurologist and physician (born 1835)
- 1919 – Alfred Deakin, Australian lawyer and politician, 2nd Prime Minister of Australia (born 1856)
- 1925 – Christy Mathewson, American baseball player and manager (born 1880)
- 1926 – Emil Kraepelin, German psychologist and academic (born 1856)
- 1933 – Alexander Peacock, Australian politician, 20th Premier of Victoria (born 1861)
- 1939 – Harvey Williams Cushing, American neurosurgeon and academic (born 1869)
- 1943 – Radclyffe Hall, English author and poet (born 1880)
- 1944 – Helmut Lent, German colonel and pilot (born 1918)
- 1950 – Willis Haviland Carrier, American engineer (born 1876)
- 1951 – Anton Philips, Dutch businessman, co-founded Philips (born 1874)
- 1956 – Clarence Birdseye, American businessman, founded Birds Eye (born 1886)
- 1959 – Mario Lanza, American tenor and actor (born 1921)
- 1963 – Oking Jaya Atmaja, Indonesian military officer (born 1918)
- 1966 – Grigoris Asikis, Greek singer-songwriter (born 1890)
- 1967 – Norman Angell, English journalist and politician, Nobel Prize laureate (born 1872)
- 1969 – Léon Scieur, Belgian cyclist (born 1888)
- 1970 – Alphonse-Marie Parent, Canadian priest and academic (born 1906)
- 1983 – George O. Abell, American astronomer, professor, science popularizer, and skeptic (born 1927)
- 1985 – Cemal Reşit Rey, Turkish pianist, composer, and conductor (born 1904)
- 1990 – Beatrice Hutton, Australian architect (born 1893)
- 1990 – Chiara Badano, Italian beatified (born1971)
- 1990 – Grim Natwick, American animator (born 1890)
- 1992 – Allan Bloom, American philosopher and educator (born 1930)
- 1992 – Babu Karam Singh Bal, Indian businessman and politician (born1927)
- 1993 – Cyril Cusack, South African-born Irish actor (born 1910)
- 1994 – Niels Kaj Jerne, Danish-English physician and immunologist, Nobel Prize laureate (born 1911)
- 1995 – Ivan Hutchinson, Australian film critic and author (born 1928)
- 1995 – Olga Taussky-Todd, Austrian-Czech-American mathematician, attendant of the Vienna Circle (born 1906)
- 1996 – Lou Lichtveld, Surinamese-Dutch author, playwright, and politician (born 1903)
- 1998 – Cees de Vreugd, Dutch strongman and weightlifter (born 1952)
- 2001 – Herblock, American cartoonist and author (born 1909)
- 2001 – Roger Gaudry, Canadian chemist and businessman (born 1913)
- 2002 – Pierangelo Bertoli, Italian singer-songwriter and guitarist (born 1942)
- 2003 – Izzy Asper, Canadian lawyer and politician (born 1932)
- 2003 – Arthur Berger, American composer and educator (born 1912)
- 2004 – Miki Matsubara, Japanese composer, lyricist, and singer (born 1959)
- 2006 – Julen Goikoetxea, Spanish cyclist (born 1985)
- 2006 – Anna Politkovskaya, American-Russian journalist and activist (born 1958)
- 2007 – Norifumi Abe, Japanese motorcycle racer (born 1975)
- 2009 – Irving Penn, American photographer (born 1917)
- 2010 – Milka Planinc, Croatian lawyer and politician, 7th Prime Minister of Yugoslavia (born 1924)
- 2011 – Ramiz Alia, Albanian politician, 1st President of Albania (born 1925)
- 2011 – Andrew Laszlo, Hungarian-American cinematographer (born 1926)
- 2012 – Mervyn M. Dymally, Trinidadian-American politician, 41st Lieutenant Governor of California (born 1926)
- 2012 – Ivo Michiels, Belgian-French author and poet (born 1923)
- 2013 – Terry Burnham, American actress (born 1949)
- 2013 – Patrice Chéreau, French actor, director, producer, and screenwriter (born 1944)
- 2013 – Leandro Mendoza, Filipino police officer and politician, 36th Executive Secretary of the Philippines (born 1946)
- 2014 – Nika Kiladze, Georgian footballer (born 1988)
- 2014 – Siegfried Lenz, Polish-German author and playwright (born 1926)
- 2014 – Iva Withers, Canadian-American actress and singer (born 1917)
- 2015 – Harry Gallatin, American basketball player and coach (born 1927)
- 2015 – Hossein Hamadani, Iranian general (born 1951)
- 2015 – Jurelang Zedkaia, Marshallese politician, 5th President of the Marshall Islands (born 1950)
- 2016 – Ross Higgins, Australian actor, comedian (born 1930)
- 2020 – Mario Molina, Mexican chemist (born 1943)
- 2022 – Arun Bali, Indian actor (born 1942)
- 2023 – Israelis murdered or fell in the line of duty during the October 7 attacks
  - Lior Asulin, Israeli footballer (born 1980)
  - Jayar Davidov, Israeli police officer (born 1979)
  - Asaf Hamami Israeli soldier who served as commander of the Southern Brigade (born 1982)
  - Hayim Katsman, American-Israeli peace activist (born 1991)
  - Ofir Libstein, Israeli politician (born 1973)
  - Roi Levy, Israel Defense Forces officer (born 1979)
  - Shani Louk, Israeli-German tattoo artist (born 2001)
  - Omer Neutra, Israeli soldier (born 2001)
  - Izhar Peled, retired Israeli police officer (born 1961)
  - Aner Shapira, an off-duty Israeli soldier who has been credited with saving the lives of at least 7 people (born 2001)
  - Vivian Silver, Canadian-Israeli peace activist (born 1949)
  - Yonatan Steinberg, Israel Defense Forces officer (born 1980)
  - Yahav Winner, Israeli filmmaker (born 1986)
- 2023 – Terence Davies, English filmmaker
- 2024 – Cissy Houston, American singer (born 1933)
- 2024 – Arie L. Kopelman, American businessman (born 1938)
- 2024 – Zaw Myint Maung, Burmese politician, physician and former political prisoner (born 1951)
- 2024 – Lore Segal, American novelist (born 1928)

== Holidays and observances ==
- Christian feast day:
  - Justina of Padua
  - Henry Muhlenberg (some Lutheran Churches, Episcopal Church of the USA)
  - Osgyth
  - Our Lady of the Rosary
  - Pope Mark
  - Sergius and Bacchus
  - October 7 (Eastern Orthodox liturgics)
- Teachers' Day (Laos)
