= Xiao Sagezhi =

Liao dynasty empress consort (died 951)

Xiao Sagezhi (Chinese: 蕭撒葛只; died 8 October 951), posthumous name Empress Huaijie (懷節皇后), was an empress consort of the Khitan-led Liao dynasty of China. She was one of the two empresses of Emperor Shizong (Yelü Ruan) and was the mother of Emperor Jingzong (Yelü Xian).

== Background ==
It is not known when Xiao Sagezhi was born. Her father, whose personal name was Aguzhi (阿古只) and who was probably still using the surname Shulü (述律) at the time that she was born, was a younger brother of Empress Shulü Ping, the wife of Liao's founder Emperor Taizu. (Note: Xiao Sagezhi's cousin Xiao Han was described by the Song dynasty historian Sima Guang, in his Zizhi Tongjian, as the first member of the Shulü household to use the name of Xiao, although it is not clear whether Sima's assertion was actually correct; the History of Liao explained that because Emperor Taizu admired the Han dynasty founder Emperor Gao, he had his own Yelü clan take on the ethnic Han surname of Liu, while having the clans of past and present consorts of Yelü chieftains take on the surname of Xiao, after Emperor Gao's prime minister Xiao He; based on Liao tradition, nearly all of the subsequent empresses of Liao carried the name of Xiao.)

During the time that Yelü Ruan was carrying the title of Prince of Yongkang under his uncle Emperor Taizong, (Note: The Liao Shi recorded that Ruan was made Prince of Yongkang in the 2nd month of the 1st year of the 1st year of the Datong era of Liao Taizong's reign. The month corresponds to 24 Feb to 24 Mar 947 in the Julian calendar.) he took Xiao Sagezhi as a consort. (Note: As Yelü Ruan was a grandson of Emperor Taizu's, they were first cousins, once removed.)

== During Emperor Shizong's reign ==
Emperor Taizong died on 15 May 947, (Note: dingchou day of the 4th month of the 1st year of the Datong era, per the annals of Liao Shizong in Liao Shi) and the Liao chieftains supported Yelü Ruan to succeed him (as Emperor Shizong). In 948, she gave birth to his second son, Yelü Xian, and later gave birth to three daughters, Yelü Hegudian (耶律和古典), Yelü Guanyin (耶律觀音), and Yelü Sala (耶律撒剌). In 950, for reasons unclear in history, Emperor Shizong created Xiao Sagezhi empress, even though he had already earlier created Lady Zhen (the mother of his third son, Yelü Zhimo (耶律只沒)), as empress.

In 951, Emperor Taizong's cousin Yelü Chage (耶律察割) mutinied and killed Emperor Shizong in a coup. Emperor Shizong's mother Empress Dowager Xiao and Empress Zhen were also killed. Empress Xiao, who had just recently given birth to Yelü Sala, rode a human-pulled cart to see Yelü Chage, asking to be allowed to prepare Emperor Shizong for burial. The next day, Yelü Chage also killed her. After Yelü Chage's coup was put down by Emperor Shizong's cousin (Emperor Taizong's son) Emperor Muzong, he gave Empress Xiao the posthumous name of Empress Xiaolie (孝烈皇后; "the filial and achieving empress"). After Yelü Xian became emperor in 969 (as Emperor Jingzong), he buried both Empresses Zhen and Xiao at Yiwulü Mountain, and built a temple dedicated to them. In 1052, Emperor Jingzong's grandson Emperor Xingzong changed her posthumous name to Empress Huaijie (懷節皇后; "the missed and careful empress").

== Notes and references ==
Xiao Sagezhi House of Yelü (916–1125) Born: unknown Died: 951
Regnal titles
Preceded by Empress Xiao Wen	Empress of the Liao dynasty 950–951; With: Empress Zhen	Succeeded by Empress Xiao (Muzong)
Preceded by Empress Xiao Wen	Empress of China (Northeastern); 950–951; With: Empress Zhen	Succeeded by Empress Xiao (Muzong)
Preceded by Empress Liu of Later Tang	Empress of China (Beijing/Tianjin/Northern Hebei/Northern Shanxi); 950–951; With: Empress Zhen)	Succeeded by Empress Xiao (Muzong)
