= Xiao Wen =

Xiao Wen (Chinese: 蕭溫; died February 18, 935), probably née Shulü Wen (述律溫), was an empress consort of the Khitan-led Chinese Liao dynasty. She was the wife of Emperor Taizong (Yelü Deguang) and the mother of Emperor Muzong (Yelü Jing). In 935, she was accorded the posthumous name Empress Zhangde (彰德皇后) by Emperor Taizong. In 1052, her posthumous name was revised to Empress Jing'an (靖安皇后) by Emperor Xingzong.

== Background ==
It is not known when Xiao Wen was born. Her father, whose personal name was Shilu (室魯) or Dilu (敵魯) and who was probably still using the surname Shulü (述律) at the time that she was born, was a younger brother of Empress Shulü Ping, the wife of Liao's founder Emperor Taizu of Liao. (Xiao Wen's older brother Xiao Han was described by the Song dynasty historian Sima Guang, in his Zizhi Tongjian, as the first member of the Shulü household to use the name of Xiao, although it is not clear whether Sima's assertion was actually correct; the History of Liao explained that because Emperor Taizu admired the Han dynasty's founder Emperor Gao (Liu Bang), he had his own Yelü clan take on the Han Chinese surname of Liu, while having the clans of past and present consorts of Yelü chieftains take on the surname of Xiao, after Emperor Gao's prime minister Xiao He; based on Liao tradition, nearly all of the subsequent empresses of Liao carried the surname of Xiao.)

Xiao Wen married Emperor Taizu's and Empress Shulü's second son Yelü Deguang while Yelü Deguang carried the title of Generalissimo. (As Yelü Deguang was bestowed that title in 923, their marriage thus would be that year or later, but before Emperor Taizu's death in 926.)

== As empress ==
After Emperor Taizu's death in 926, Yelü Deguang succeeded to the throne in 927 (as Emperor Taizong), bypassing his older brother Yelü Bei. The new emperor created Xiao Wen empress shortly thereafter.

Empress Xiao was described to be intelligent, virtuous, and frugal. She was much favored by Emperor Taizong, such that she accompanied him on campaigns and hunts. She gave birth to his first son Yelü Jing in 931. Around the new year 935, she gave birth to his second son Yelü Yansage (耶律罨撒葛), and thereafter fell gravely ill. She died a month later. She was initially given the posthumous name of Zhangde (彰德, "displayed virtue"); her eventual posthumous name of Jing'an was given by Emperor Xingzong.

== Notes and references ==
- History of Liao, vol. 71.

Xiao Wen House of Yelü (916–1125) Born: unknown Died: 936
Regnal titles
Preceded by Empress Shulü Ping	Empress of Liao dynasty 927–936	Succeeded by Empress Xiao Sagezhi and Empress Zhen
