= Muzong =

Muzong may refer to:

- Emperor Muzong of Tang (795–824), Chinese emperor of the Tang dynasty, reigned 820–824
- Emperor Muzong of Liao (931–969), Khitan emperor of the Liao dynasty, reigned 951–969
- Emperor Muzong of Ming, or the Longqing Emperor (1537–1572), Chinese emperor of the Ming dynasty, reigned 1567–1572
- Emperor Muzong of Qing, or the Tongzhi Emperor (1856–1875), Manchu emperor of the Qing dynasty, reigned 1861–1875
