= Wuyu =

Wuyu may refer to:

- Emperor Shizong of Liao (personal name: 兀欲, pinyin: Wùyù)
- Wu Chinese (Chinese: 吳語, pinyin: Wúyǔ)
- Marquis Wuyu of Yue, first ruler of the state of Yue in ancient China
