= Yelü Hou'abu =

Yelü Hou'abu 耶律吼阿不
- Crown Prince Zhuangsheng
- Born: Yelü Hou'abu; Liao China
- Died: Liao China
- Burial: Crown Prince's Mausoleum (墓号太子院)
- Father: Emperor Shizong of Liao
- Mother: Xiao Sagezhi (disputed)

Yelü Hou'abu
- Simplified Chinese: 耶律吼阿不
Transcriptions
Standard Mandarin
- Hanyu Pinyin: Yélǜ Hǒu'ābù

Yelü Hou'abu (Chinese: 耶律吼阿不), posthumous name Crown Prince Zhuangsheng (Chinese: 莊聖皇太子), was an imperial prince of the Liao dynasty of China. He was the oldest son of the Emperor Shizong and Xiao Sagezhi. He was the oldest brother of the Emperor Jingzong. However, he died at a young age and when the Emperor Jingzong ascended to the throne, Hou'abu was formally honoured as the Crown Prince Zhuangsheng.
