= Zhimo =

Zhimo is a transliteration of multiple Chinese-language given names. Notable people with such a name include:

- Ji Zhimo (Chinese: 嵇志默), pen name of Chinese musicologist Xue Fan (1934–2022)
- Xu Zhimo (Chinese: 徐志摩; 1897–1931), Chinese poet
- Yelü Zhimo (Chinese: 耶律只没; died 983), Liao dynasty prince
