= Yelü Bei =

King of Dongdan from 926 to 937

Yelü Bei 耶律倍

King of Dongdan
- Reign: April 4, 926 – January 7, 937
- Successor: Emperor Shizong of Liao
- Born: Tuyu (圖欲); 899
- Died: January 7, 937 (aged 38); Luoyang
- Burial: Xianling Mausoleum (顯陵, in present-day Beizhen, Jinzhou, Liaoning)
- Spouse: See § Family
- Issue: Emperor Shizong of Liao
Names
- Family name: Yēlǜ (耶律); Khitan given name: Tuyu (圖欲); Chinese given name: Bèi (倍)
Era name and dates
- Ganlu (甘露): 926–936
Posthumous name
- Emperor Rangguo (讓國皇帝, (Conferred by Emperor Shizong); Emperor Wenxian (文獻皇帝, (Conferred by Emperor Shengzong); Emperor Wenxian Qinyi (文獻欽義皇帝, Conferred by Emperor Xingzong)
Temple name
- Yizong (義宗)
- Father: Emperor Taizu of Liao
- Mother: Empress Shulü Ping

Yelü Bei (Chinese: 耶律倍) (899 – January 7, 937), also known as Yelü Tuyu (耶律突欲 or 耶律圖欲), posthumously honored Emperor Wenxian Qinyi (文獻欽義皇帝) with the temple name Yizong (Simplified: 辽义宗, Traditional: 遼義宗), formally known as Renhuang Wang (人皇王, "imperial king of men") during his lifetime (including his period as the King of Dongdan), known as Dongdan Muhua (東丹慕華) (931) and then Li Zanhua (李贊華) (931–937) as a Later Tang subject, was the eldest son of Emperor Taizu of Liao, the founder of the Liao dynasty. He was declared successor to the Emperor Taizu in 916, but never succeeded to the throne. Rather, after the accession of his younger brother Yelü Deguang (Emperor Taizong), he fled to the Shatuo-led Later Tang dynasty, where he was killed in 937.

== Background ==
Yelü Bei was born in 899, before the founding of the Liao dynasty. His father was the Yelü clan chieftain Yelü Abaoji, and his mother was Yelü Abaoji's wife Shulü Ping; he was their first son. He was described by the History of Liao as intelligent and studious in his youth, with a relaxed appearance and a loving heart.

In 916, when Yelü Abaoji declared himself emperor of a new Khitan-led empire, known posthumously as Emperor Taizu, he created Yelü Bei his crown prince. When Emperor Taizu inquired of his attendants which god he should first offer sacrifice to as part of his becoming emperor, his attendants largely advocated offering sacrifices to the Buddha. When Emperor Taizu pointed out that the Buddha was not a Chinese god, Yelü Bei advocated offering first to Confucius. Emperor Taizu was pleased by the suggestion and built a temple for Confucius, having Yelü Bei offer sacrifices to him twice a year.

Yelü Bei subsequently served as Emperor Taizu's forward commander in campaigns against the Wugu (烏古) and the Tangut tribes. Later, on incursions that Emperor Taizu made into the Chinese/Shatuo state Former Jin territory – specifically, Jin's Lulong Circuit (盧龍, headquartered in modern Beijing) – he left Yelü Bei in charge at his capital Linhuang Municipality (臨潢, in modern Chifeng, Inner Mongolia). It was during this time that Yelü Bei was said to have drafted a plan to conquer Khitan's eastern neighbor Balhae.

"The ruler who has received the Mandate of Heaven should be attentive to Heaven and respectful to the great spirits. To those of greatest merit I should offer my veneration. Which among them ranks first?" All present replied that it should be the Buddha. Abaoji responded: "Buddhism is not a Chinese teaching." Then Prince Bei spoke: "Confucius is the great sage, revered for myriad generations. He should rank first." Abaoji was delighted. Thereupon he ordered that a Confucian temple be constructed and decreed that the heir himself should conduct the spring and autumn ritual offerings.

— History of Liao

== As King of Dongdan ==
In 926, Emperor Taizu decided to carry out the plans to conquer Balhae. In a campaign, he captured the important Balhae city Fuyu (夫餘, in modern Siping, Jilin). (This appeared to have ended the Balhae state, even though Emperor Taizu did not at this time capture Balhae's capital Longquan.) Emperor Taizu set up a Dongdan Kingdom over the old Balhae territory, with its capital at Fuyu, and made Yelü Bei its king, with the title of "Imperial King of Man" (人皇王, Ren Huangwang), echoing the titles used by himself ("Imperial Emperor of Heaven," 天皇帝, Tian Huangdi) and his wife (Yelü Bei's mother) Empress Shulü ("Imperial Empress of Earth," 地皇后, Di Huanghou). He gave his second son (Yelü Bei's younger brother) Yelü Deguang the title of "Generalissimo Crown Prince" and made Yelü Deguang in charge of Linhuang, replacing Yelü Bei.

Shortly after conquering Fuyu, however, Emperor Taizu fell ill and died while still at Fuyu. Empress Shulü took over effective leadership of the Khitan, and she and Yelü Bei began the trek of escorting Emperor Taizu's casket back to Linhuang, leaving one of Emperor Taizu's younger brother Yelü Anduan (耶律安端) temporarily in charge at Dongdan. Once then returned to Linhuang, she wanted to divert the succession away from Yelü Bei, as she had favored Yelü Deguang. However, formally, she called an assembly of the chieftains, along with Yelü Bei and Yelü Deguang, and stated to them, "I love both of my sons, and I do not know which one to make emperor. You can decide which one you wish to support by holding his rein." The chieftains, knowing that she favored Yelü Deguang, rushed to him and held to his rein. She thereafter declared him emperor (as Emperor Taizong). Yelü Bei, angry over this turn of events, took several hundred soldiers and wanted to flee to Later Tang (Jin's successor state), but was intercepted by Khitan border guards. Empress Shulü (now empress dowager) did not punish him, but sent him to Dongdan.

Emperor Taizong, after becoming emperor, became suspicious as to whether his older brother intended to take back the throne, and therefore moved Dongdan's capital to Dongping (東平, in modern Liaoyang, Liaoning) and forcibly moved the former Balhae people to Dongping. He also put guards in place to monitor Yelü Bei's actions. When Emperor Mingzong of Later Tang heard this, he sent secret emissaries encouraging Yelü Bei to flee to Later Tang. Yelü Bei, commenting, "I yielded the empire to the Emperor, but now I am under suspicion. It is better that I go to another state so that I can be like Wu Taibo." He thus took his favorite concubine Lady Gao and his extensive book collection, got into a ship, and sailed to Later Tang. In 930, he arrived at Later Tang's Deng Prefecture (登州, in modern Yantai, Shandong). (Yelü Bei's wife Imperial Queen Xiao and his oldest son Yelü Ruan did not follow him to Later Tang, and Imperial Queen Xiao would subsequently continue to rule the Dongdan state until her death in 940, while Yelü Ruan would eventually succeed Emperor Taizong after his death (as Emperor Shizong).)

== As Later Tang subject ==
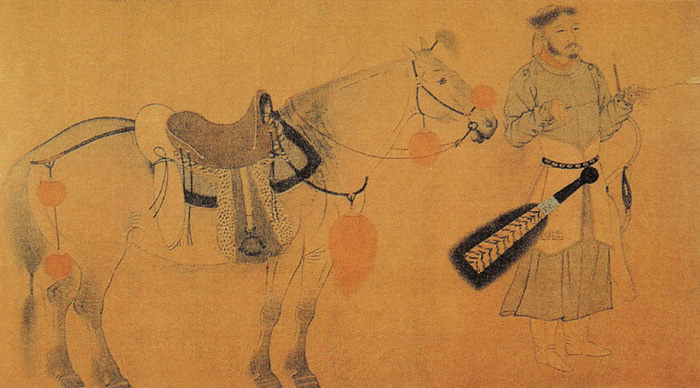
騎射圖 "Archer and Horse" attributed to Yelü Bei, National Palace Museum, Taipei

=== During Emperor Mingzong's reign ===
In 931, Emperor Mingzong made Yelü Bei the military governor (Jiedushi) of a newly created Huaihua Circuit (懷化, headquartered in modern Baoding, Hebei), and gave him a new name of Dongdan Muhua. Later in the year, he changed the Dongdan Muhua name further to Li Zanhua, and that would be the name used by the Khitan prince for the rest of his life. However, there was no sign that Li Zanhua ever reported to Huaihua, and in 932, Emperor Mingzong instead stated an intention to give him a command south of the Yellow River. When the Later Tang officials opposed, Emperor Mingzong stated, "His father and I agreed to be blood brothers, and that is why Zanhua came to me. I am now old. How would he have even come to a later emperor now matter how hard they enticed him?" He thereafter made Li Zanhua the military governor of Yicheng Circuit (義成, headquartered in modern Anyang, Henan), but selected a talented staff to take effective governance of the circuit, allowing Li Zanhua not to carry out actual responsibilities. He also gave a concubine of his predecessor Emperor Zhuangzong's, Lady Xia, to Li Zanhua to be his new wife, and he also was lenient toward Li Zanhua such that even when Li Zanhua committed offenses, he would not punish Li Zanhua. However, it was said that Li Zanhua was cruel toward his concubines and servants – as he liked to drink blood, his concubines often had to injure themselves so that they would bleed for him to drink, and the servants would often suffer severe punishments, including having their eyes gouged out, being cut by swords, or being burnt by fire, for minor faults. Lady Xia eventually could not endure seeing this and, after requesting permission from Emperor Mingzong, divorced Li Zanhua and became a Buddhist nun. Despite his cruelty, however, Li Zanhua was also said to be highly talented. He understood fortunetelling and music, and was very talented in medicine. He could write in both the Khitan and Han languages, and translated the Huangdi Yinfujing into Khitan. He was particularly well known for his paintings of Khitan people and things, and many of his paintings eventually ended up in the palace collections of the Song Dynasty decades later. The catalogue, the Xuanhe Huapu, records 15 paintings in the Imperial Holdings, all related to the theme of horsemen, deer, and hunting. In 933, he was recalled from Yicheng and given the completely honorary title of military governor of Zhaoxin Circuit (昭信, headquartered in modern Ganzhou, Jiangxi) (as Zhaoxin's territory was then ruled by Wu).

Despite his having fled to Later Tang territory and becoming a Later Tang subject, Li Zanhua continued to maintain communications with his mother and brother, often sending emissaries to them. The communication went the other way around, too, as when his grandmother Grand Empress Dowager Yaonian died in 933, his mother and brother notified him of her death.

=== After Emperor Mingzong's reign ===
Also in 933, Emperor Mingzong died, and was initially succeeded by his biological son Li Conghou the Prince of Song (as Emperor Min). In 934, Emperor Mingzong's adoptive son Li Congke the Prince of Lu overthrew Emperor Min in a rebellion and became emperor. Li Zanhua was said to have secretly communicated to his brother Emperor Taizong the opinion that this was a good opportunity to invade Later Tang, although Emperor Taizong took no actions at that time.

Throughout the years, apparently because of Li Zanhus'a presence in Later Tang and the fact that Later Tang had captured a number of important Khitan commanders, Empress Dowager Shulü had repeatedly sought heqin alliances between Khitan and Later Tang. In early 936, Li Congke, apprehensive over the prospect that his brother-in-law Shi Jingtang the military governor of Hedong Circuit (河東, headquartered in modern Taiyuan, Shanxi) might rebel and enlist Khitan aid in doing so, had his officials Li Song and Lü Qi (呂琦) draft a plan under which such an alliance would occur – but then abandoned the plan.

Later in the year, Shi Jingtang did rebel, and Later Tang forces was initially successful in advancing to Hedong's capital Taiyuan Municipality and putting it under siege. However, they were thereafter crushed by aid troops that Emperor Taizong himself commanded and trapped by Khitan forces at Jin'an Base (晉安寨, near Taiyuan). When Li Congke sought advice from his officials, Long Min (龍敏) suggested that he create Li Zanhua the Emperor of Khitan and send an army to escort him back to Khitan territory, to create a second front that Khitan's Emperor Taizong would have to deal with. Li Congke gave initial approval to the plan, but the more powerful officials opposed, believing the plan to be useless, and nothing eventually came of it.

Eventually, Emperor Taizong created Shi the emperor of a new Later Jin (as its Emperor Gaozu), and Shi subsequently headed south, with Khitan aid, toward the Later Tang capital Luoyang. With Later Tang generals defecting to Later Jin in droves, Li Congke gathered his family and generals loyal to him to the palace, intending to commit suicide by burning down the palace. When he summoned Li Zanhua, however, Li Zanhua refused to join the mass suicide, so Li Congke sent the officer Li Yanshen (李彥紳) to kill Li Zanhua. After the new Later Jin emperor entered Luoyang, he mourned Li Zanhua, posthumously created Li Zanhua the Prince of Yan, and had his body delivered back to Khitan.

== Titles (including posthumous) ==
=== While living ===
- Crown Prince (皇太子, Huang Taizi) (916-931)
- Imperial King of Men (人皇王, Ren Huangwang) (931-937)

=== Posthumous ===
- Prince of Yan (燕王) (conferred by Later Jin)
- Imperial King Wenwuyuan (文武元皇王, Wenwuyuan Huang Wang) (conferred by Emperor Taizong of Liao)
- Emperor Rangguo (讓國皇帝) (conferred by Emperor Shizong of Liao)
- Emperor Wenxian (文獻皇帝) (conferred by Emperor Shengzong of Liao)
- Emperor Wenxian Qinyi (文獻欽義皇帝) with the temple name Yizong (義宗) (conferred by Emperor Xingzong of Liao)

== Family ==
Consorts and Issue:

- Empress Duanshun, of the Xiao clan (端順皇后 蕭氏; d. 940), a relative of Shulü Ping
- Lady Xia (夏氏), a former concubine of Emperor Zhuangzong of Later Tang, the Lady of Guo (虢國夫人), later divorced Yelü Bei and became a Buddhist nun
- Empress Rouzhen, of the Xiao clan (柔貞皇后 蕭氏; d. 951), a relative of Shulü Ping
  - Yelü Ruan, Emperor Shizong of Liao (耶律阮; 919–951), 1st son
  - Yelü Louguo (耶律婁國; d. 952), 2nd son
  - Yelü Shao, Prince of Wu (吳王 耶律稍; d. 985), 3rd son
- Concubine, of the Da clan of Balhae (大氏)
  - Yelü Longxian, Prince of Ping (平王 耶律隆先), 4th son
- Beauty, of the Gao clan (美人 高氏)
  - Yelü Daoyin, Prince of Jin (晉王 耶律道隱; d. 983), 5th son
- Unknown
  - Yelü Abuli (耶律阿不里; d. 949), 1st daughter
    - Married Xiao Han (蕭翰; d. 949), a nephew of Shulü Ping

== Notes ==
Preceded by Ae of Balhae	Dongdan Kingdom; 926–930	Succeeded by Queen Xiao of Dongdan Kingdom (Regent)
