= Shulü Ping =

Liao dynasty empress dowager (879–953)

- Born: 19 October 879
- Died: 1 August 953 (aged 73)
- Spouse: Emperor Taizu of Liao
- Issue: Yelü Bei, Emperor Wenxian Qinyi; Emperor Taizong of Liao; Yelü Lihu, Emperor Zhangsui
Names
- Empress Di (地皇后); Empress Yingtian Daiming Di (應天大明地皇后); Empress Dowager Guangdi Zhiren Zhaoli Chongjiang Yingtian (廣德至仁昭烈崇簡應天皇太后)
Posthumous name
- Empress Zhenlie (貞烈皇后); Empress Chunqin (淳欽皇后)
- Father: Shulü Pogu

Shulü Ping (Chinese: 述律平; 19 October 879 – 1 August 953), nickname Yueliduo (月里朵), formally Empress Yingtian (simplified Chinese: 应天皇后; traditional Chinese: 應天皇后) also known as Empress Di (地皇后) during the reign of her husband Emperor Taizu of Liao (Yelü Abaoji), posthumous name initially Empress Zhenlie (貞烈皇后, "the virtuous and achieving empress") then Empress Chunqin (淳欽皇后, "the pure and honoured empress") was an empress of the Khitan-led Liao dynasty of China. After Emperor Taizu's death in 926, she served as empress dowager until her death in 953. She was directly involved in two imperial successions and is credited with changing expectations of widows in Khitan society.

== Background ==
Shulü Ping was born in 879. Her great-great-grandfather Shulü Nuosi (述律糯思) was said to be of Uyghur extraction. Her father was named Shulü Pogu (述律婆姑), who also had the name of Yuewan (月碗), served under the Khitan Yaonian (遙輦) clan. Her mother was said to be a daughter of "King Yundejia" (勻德恝王)—apparently the grandfather of her eventual husband Yelü Abaoji, Yelü Yundeshi (耶律勻德實)—which would make her and Yelü Abaoji cousins. Eventually, she married Yelü Abaoji as his wife, but it is not known when that occurred. She bore Yelü Abaoji three sons—Yelü Bei, Yelü Deguang, and Yelü Lihu.

== During Emperor Taizu's reign ==
In 916, Yelü Abaoji, having consolidated the power over the Khitan tribes into his hands, declared himself emperor of a new Liao dynasty, and created Shulü Ping empress. As empress, she was described as brave, resolute, and full of strategies, often participating in Emperor Taizu's military decisions. There was one time when Emperor Taizu was attacking the Dangxiang through the desert. He left Empress Shulü in charge of the headquarters. Hearing that he was away, two Shiwei tribes, the Huangtou (黃頭) and the Choubo (臭泊), decided to raid the Khitan headquarters. She heard of their plans, however, and put her army on an ambush posture, crushing them upon their arrival. Her reputation among the nomadic people thereafter became prominent. It was said that she refused to bow to her mother and her mother-in-law, but rather received their bows, stating, "I only bow to Heaven, not to people." As, at that time, the Shatuo prince of Jin, Li Cunxu, was locked in a war against archrival Later Liang, he sought an alliance with the Khitan, and he honoured Emperor Taizu as an uncle and Empress Shulü as an aunt.

In 921, the general Lu Wenjin, who had defected from Jin to Khitan, urged Emperor Taizu to attack Jin. About the same time, two coups occurred within the domains of Jin allies Zhao and Yiwu Circuit (義武, headquartered in modern Baoding, Hebei)—as Zhao's prince Wang Rong was assassinated and his adoptive son Zhang Wenli seized control of the domain, and Yiwu's military governor Wang Chuzhi was overthrown by his adoptive son Wang Du. Zhang sought aid from Khitan. Wang Chuzhi's biological son Wang Yu (王郁) fled to Khitan, also encouraging Emperor Taizu to aid Zhang and use the chance to take control of both domains. Emperor Taizu agreed, and launched his army south. Empress Shulü opposed the operation. The Khitan army was subsequently defeated by the Jin army, and forced to withdraw.

In 926, Emperor Taizu launched a major attack on Balhae, conquering it. He converted it to a kingdom named Dongdan, creating his and Empress Shulü's oldest son Yelü Bei its king, with the title of "Imperial King Ren" (人皇王, Ren Huangwang)—while their second son Yelü Deguang was, at the same time, given the title of "General Crown Prince". It was said that this campaign was conducted with Empress Shulü's strategies.

Soon after conquering Balhae, Emperor Taizu died. Empress Shulü, at that time with Yelü Bei at Dongan, apparently to destroy potential dissent, gathered the wives of many generals and officials that she considered difficult to control, and stated to them, "I am now a widow. You should be like I am." Then, she gathered their husbands and, weeping, asked them, "Do you miss the deceased Emperor?" They responded, "The deceased Emperor has shown us much grace. Of course we miss him." She responded, "If you miss him, then go see him." She then slaughtered them. She then, leaving Emperor Taizu's younger brother Yelü Anduan (耶律安端) temporarily in charge at Dongdan, returned to the Khitan capital Linhuang (臨潢, in modern Chifeng, Inner Mongolia) with Yelü Bei, escorting Emperor Taizu's casket.

Once then returned to Linhuang, she wanted to divert the succession away from Yelü Bei, as she had favored Yelü Deguang. However, formally, she called an assembly of the chieftains, along with Yelü Bei and Yelü Deguang, and stated to them, "I love both of my sons, and I do not know which one to make emperor. You can decide which one you wish to support by holding his rein." The chieftains, knowing that she favoured Yelü Deguang, rushed to him and held to his rein. She thereafter declared him emperor (as Emperor Taizong). Yelü Bei, angry over this turn of events, took several hundred soldiers and wanted to flee to Later Tang (Jin's successor state), but was intercepted by Khitan border guards. Empress Shulü did not punish him, but sent him to Dongdan.

== During Emperor Taizong's reign ==
Emperor Taizong honored Empress Shulü as empress dowager, and it was said that she made the key decisions for the state. She also had him marry her niece (Xiao Wen) as empress. (The reason why Empress Xiao, and other members of her clan, were from this point referred to with the surname of Xiao rather than Shulü, was that Emperor Taizu had the several clans that produced consorts for his line change their names to Xiao.) It was said that Emperor Taizong was filially pious, such that if she were unable to eat due to an illness, he would not eat either. She commissioned the ethnic Han official Han Yanhui as a chancellor. She also allowed the Later Tang emissary Yao Kun (姚坤), whom Emperor Taizu had detained, to return to Later Tang, and sent an emissary herself to Later Tang to report Emperor Taizu's death.

Meanwhile, Empress Dowager Shulü continued to carry out killings of those she considered difficult to control. She would often tell such killing targets, "Deliver a message to the deceased Emperor for me!" After they arrived at Emperor Taizu's tomb, she would execute them. After several hundreds were killed in this way, she sent one Zhao Siwen (趙思溫) to do so. Zhao refused. She stated to him, "You were a close attendant of the deceased Emperor. Why do you refuse to go?" He responded, "No one was closer than you, Empress. If you go, I, your subject, will go next." Apparently impressed, she responded, "It is not that I am not willing to follow the deceased Emperor below ground. It is that the heir, my son, is young and weak. The state needs a leader, and therefore I cannot go." However, she cut off one of her hands and ordered that it be buried at Emperor Taizu's tomb. After this event, Zhao was spared. (Another account had it that she wanted to die as well at Emperor Taizu's death, but was dissuaded by her relatives, so she then came up with the solution of cutting off one of her hands.)

In 936, the Later Tang general Shi Jingtang, with military assistance from Emperor Taizong, overthrew then-Later Tang emperor Li Congke and established a new state of Later Jin, subservient to the Liao. When one of the Later Tang generals that Emperor Taizong captured, Zhao Dejun the military governor of Lulong Circuit (盧龍, headquartered in modern Beijing), was delivered to Empress Dowager Shulü, she pointed out Zhao's hypocrisy in claiming to want to defend the Later Tang emperor while actually engaging in negotiations with Emperor Taizong to have his support for the throne instead. When Zhao offered his properties at Lulong's capital You Prefecture (幽州) to her, she pointed out that Shi, as part of his agreement with Emperor Taizong to cede 16 prefectures to Khitan, had already been ceded to her, and therefore was no longer Zhao's, causing Zhao to be distressed and subsequently dying in Khitan captivity.

Shi Jingtang honoured Emperor Taizong and Empress Dowager Shulü faithfully and often offered them gifts, and in fact referred to himself as "Son Emperor" and Emperor Taizong as "Father Emperor." However, after Shi Jingtang's death and succession by his nephew Shi Chonggui, Shi Chonggui took a confrontational stance against the Liao, refusing to submit to Emperor Taizong as a subject, only referring to himself as "grandson." He also had Liao merchants arrested, and their assets seized. As a result, war erupted between the states. Empress Dowager Shulü was not in favor of waging war against Later Jin. As a result, Emperor Taizong entered into some peace negotiations with Shi Conggui in 945 that, however, were ultimately fruitless.

In 946, Shi Chonggui commissioned the Later Jin general Du Wei with an army to attack Liao, with the intent to recapture the territory Shi Jingtang previously ceded to Liao. Emperor Taizong, however, was able to have Du's army surrounded, and Du surrendered. He then attacked south toward Later Jin's capital Kaifeng. With the capital defenceless because the army had been given to Du, Shi Chonggui surrendered, ending Later Jin. Emperor Taizong initially claimed to be the emperor for the former Later Jin territory as well. To congratulate him for this great victory, Empress Dowager Shulü sent wine, delicacies, and fruits from Khitan lands to Kaifeng. Whenever he drank the wine that she sent, he stood up and stated, "This was bestowed by the Empress Dowager. I do not dare to drink it sitting down."

Soon, however, faced with many rebellions against Liao rule in the former Later Jin lands, Emperor Taizong decided to return north to Liao proper. However, he became ill on the way and died near Heng Prefecture (恆州, in modern Shijiazhuang, Hebei). Upon receiving his casket, Empress Dowager Shulü did not weep. Instead, she, apparently sensing that her power would be challenged, stated, "When all of the tribes are peaceful, I will then bury you."

== During Emperor Shizong's and Emperor Muzong's reigns ==
In fact, Empress Dowager Shulü's will would soon be challenged. She had intended that Emperor Taizong be succeeded by Yelü Lihu. However, the Khitan chieftains, remembering how she had slaughtered many upon Emperor Taizu's death, decided to support Yelü Bei's son Yelü Ruan the Prince of Yongkang instead, and Yelü Ruan declared himself emperor at Heng Prefecture (as Emperor Shizong). He continued north, heading toward Linhuang. Empress Dowager Shulü sent troops under her to resist Emperor Shizong's progress. Yelü Lihu, in command of these troops, was however defeated by Emperor Shizong's forward commanders Yelü Anduan and Yelü Liuge (耶律留哥), and she then negotiated a peace agreement accepting Emperor Shizong as emperor. Emperor Shizong then put her under house arrest at Emperor Taizu's tomb at Zu Prefecture (祖州, in modern Chifeng). She died there in 953, during the reign of Emperor Muzong, a son of Emperor Taizong's. Both Shizong and Muzong resented her for supporting Lihu, so neither lifted her house arrest, nor honored her as grand empress dowager. She was buried with Emperor Taizu.

== Important contributions ==
While Empress Shulü dominated the court in the first succession, she also made other contributions to Khitan culture. Most importantly regards the expectations of widows. In traditional Khitan society, women were expected to sacrifice themselves. However, she did not do that, providing an example for other women, at least within the elite strata, of Khitan society.

== Differences from Han counterparts ==
Ethnic Han empress dowagers of the era were expected to wield their influence behind the scenes. However, Khitan women held a far higher status than their Han counterparts in the tenth century. Empress Shulü openly wielded her influence in the court of her husband as well as that of her son as empress dowager.

== Work referenced ==
- Mote, F.W. (1999). Imperial China: 900-1800. Harvard University Press. pp. 49–52. ISBN 0-674-01212-7.
- Bennet Peterson, Barbara (2000). Notable Women of China: Shang Dynasty to the Early Twentieth Century. M.E. Sharpe, Inc.
- History of Liao, vol. 71.
- Zizhi Tongjian, vols. 269, 271, 275, 280, 281, 284, 286, 287.

Shulü Ping House of Yelü (916–1125) Born: 879 Died: 953
Regnal titles
Preceded by Dynasty Created	Empress of the Liao dynasty 916–926	Succeeded by Empress Xiao Wen
Preceded by Empress He of the Tang dynasty	Emperor of China (Eastern Inner Mongolia); 916–926	Succeeded by Empress Xiao Wen
