= Yaonian Yanmujin =

10th-century empress dowager of the Liao dynasty

Yaonian Yanmujin (Chinese: 遙輦巖母斤) or Xiao Yanmujin (Chinese: 蕭巖母斤) (died 18 December 933), formally Empress Xuanjian (宣簡皇后), was an empress dowager of the Khitan-led Chinese Liao dynasty. She was the mother of Liao's founder Emperor Taizu of Liao (Yelü Abaoji) and the wife of his father Yelü Saladi (耶律薩剌的). During the reign of Emperor Taizu's son Emperor Taizong, she was grand empress dowager.

== Background and marriage to Yelü Saladi ==
It is not known when Yaonian Yanmujin was born. (She is referred to in traditional historical sources (such as the History of Liao) as Xiao Yanmujin because, according to the History of Liao, Emperor Taizu greatly admired Emperor Gao of Han, and so referred to his own Yelü clan by the name of Liu as well, while he had the names of the traditional wife clans of Yelü chieftains — the most prominent of whom included the Yishi (乙室) and Bali (拔裏) clans — change their names to Xiao (after Emperor Gao's prime minister Xiao He), and thus almost all Liao empresses, both actual and posthumously honored ones, were known by the surname of Xiao.) Yaonian Yanmujin was of the Yaonian clan and was a daughter of the chancellor Yaonian Tila (遙輦剔剌).

At some point, Yaonian Yanmujin married the Yelü chieftain Yelü Saladi. They had six children — including five of Yaonian's six sons and his oldest son Yelü Abaoji, and one daughter.

== As empress dowager ==
After Yelü Abaoji succeeded Yelü Saladi as the Yelü chief, he conquered the other Khitan tribes by force, and by 907, he had declared himself the emperor of a new Khitan Empire (which would later become known as Liao) as its Emperor Taizu. He honored his mother Yaonian Yamujin as empress dowager. Still, despite her honored title, her daughter-in-law Empress Shulü Ping, because of Empress Shulü's own battlefield accomplishments, refused to bow to her (or Empress Shulü's own mother) and instead made them bow to herself, stating, "I only bow to Heaven, not to humans."

In 913, while Emperor Taizu was away at Lu River (蘆水), he believed that there would be a joint rebellion by his brothers Yelü Diela (耶律迭剌 [whom he had made the King of the Xi]) and Yelü Anduan (耶律安端), and therefore arrested them. When another brother, Yelü Lage (耶律剌葛) heard this, Yelü Lage then arrived at the Khitan headquarters with an army, apparently planning to declare himself emperor. It was at Empress Dowager Yaonian's orders that he departed from the headquarters. His army subsequently pillaged the headquarters but were repelled by Empress Shulü's army, and they subsequently departed.

In 919, on an occasion when Emperor Taizu was attacking the Wugu Tribe (烏古), he heard that Empress Dowager Yaonian was ill, and therefore returned to headquarters to attend to her. He resumed the Wugu campaign once she recovered.

== As grand empress dowager ==
In 927, Emperor Taizu died and was succeeded by his son Yelü Deguang (as Emperor Taizong). Emperor Taizong honored Empress Dowager Yaonian as grand empress dowager. She died in 933.
