= Empress Dowager Xiao (Shizong) =

Empress Dowager Xiao (Chinese: 蕭太后; personal name unknown) (died 7 October 951?), formally Empress Rouzhen (柔貞皇后), was an empress dowager of the Khitan-led Chinese Liao dynasty. She was a concubine of Yelü Bei (posthumously honored Emperor Yizong) and the mother of Emperor Shizong (Yelü Ruan).

== Background ==
Not much is known about Lady Xiao's background, because she lacked a biography in the History of Liao's biographies for empresses (including posthumously honoured empresses). (Yelü Bei's wife, also with the surname of Xiao, was posthumously honoured Empress Duanshun, and similarly lacked a biography in the History of Liao). Her son with Yelü Bei, Yelü Ruan, was Yelü Bei's oldest son. It is not known whether she bore Yelü Bei any other children, but it is known that she was not the mother of his two youngest sons, Yelü Longxian (耶律隆先) (born of Lady Da) and Yelü Daoyin (耶律道隱) (born of Lady Gao).

== As empress dowager ==
In 947, then-Liao emperor Emperor Taizong (Yelü Bei's younger brother) died, and Yelü Ruan was supported by the Liao chieftains to succeed him (as Emperor Shizong). He honoured Lady Xiao as empress dowager. He established a headquarters for her family.

In 951, Yelü Bei's cousin Yelü Chage (耶律察割) started a coup and assassinated Emperor Shizong. It appeared that Empress Dowager Xiao was also killed in the coup, likely on the same day, because the biography of Emperor Shizong's wife, Empress Xiao Sagezhi indicated that Yelü Chage mutinied and "killed the Empress Dowager and the Emperor" while explicitly stating that Empress Xiao Sagezhi was killed the next day. In 1052, Emperor Shizong's great-grandson Emperor Xingzong, when giving greater posthumous honours to Yelü Bei, posthumously honoured both her and Yelü Bei's wife with empress titles.
