= Yelü Zhimo =

- King of Ning
- Born: ?
- Died: 983
- Spouse: Queen of Ning
- Father: Emperor Shizong
- Mother: Empress Zhen

Yelü Zhimo (Chinese: 耶律只没; ? — 983), also known by his title the King of Ning (宁王), was an imperial prince of the Liao dynasty. He was granted as the King of Ning during the reign of Emperor Muzong of Liao. He was the third son of Emperor Shizong by Empress Zhen. His mother was the only Han Empress Consort in Liao's history. He was half younger brother of Emperor Jingzong. Zhimo has an affair with one of Yelü Jing's maid and after it was discovered by Jing own, he lost one of his eye to protect his lover and then become half blind, also sentenced to imperial punishment and became an eunuch. After his wife death, he started live alone in his Mansion and became a Buddhist monk.

== In popular culture ==
- Portrayed by Simon Lian in the 2020 Chinese TV series The Legend of Xiao Chuo.
