= Empress Zhen (Liao dynasty) =

Empress Zhen (Chinese: 甄皇后) (died October 7, 951?) was an empress of the Khitan-led Liao dynasty of China. She was one of the two empresses of Emperor Shizong (Yelü Ruan).

== Background ==
It is not known where or when the future Empress Zhen was born. She was said to be a lady in the Later Tang palace, but it is not clear whether she was a concubine of one of Later Tang's emperors or a lady in waiting. She was described to be beautiful. It is not known whether she remained in the palace during the succeeding state Later Jin.

In 946, Yelü Ruan, then the Prince of Yongkang under his uncle Emperor Taizong, followed Emperor Taizong on his campaign to destroy Later Jin. After Later Jin was destroyed, Emperor Taizong awarded Lady Zhen to Yelü Ruan, and it was said that he greatly favored her.

== As empress ==
Emperor Taizong died in 947, and the Liao chieftains supported Yelü Ruan to succeed him (as Emperor Shizong). Sometime after becoming emperor, he created Lady Zhen empress. It was said that she was strict, intelligent, and elegant. She was said to govern his palace with proper principles, and did not just do so with her own personal desires. She participated in Emperor Shizong's decision-making processes, and had strategies on how to deal with Later Jin's successor states Later Han and Later Zhou, but her strategies were not implemented. She gave birth to his third son, Yelü Zhimo (耶律只沒). In 950, for reasons lost to history, Emperor Shizong also created his oldest son Yelü Xian's mother Xiao Sagezhi as an empress, but Empress Zhen remained empress as well.

In 951, Emperor Taizong's cousin Yelü Chage (耶律察割) mutinied and killed Emperor Shizong in a coup. Empress Zhen was also killed, probably on the same day, as Empress Xiao Sagezhi was specifically indicated to have been killed on the next day. After Yelü Xian became emperor in 969, he buried both Empresses Zhen and Xiao at Yiwulü Mountain, and built a temple dedicated to them.

== In popular culture ==
- Portrayed by Wang Yuanke in the 2020 Chinese TV series The Legend of Xiao Chuo.

== Notes and references ==
Empress Zhen (Liao dynasty) House of Yelü (916–1125) Born: unknown Died: 951
Regnal titles
Preceded by Empress Xiao Wen	Empress of Liao Dynasty; 947?–951; With: Empress Xiao Sagezhi (950–951)	Succeeded by Empress Xiao (Muzong)
Preceded by Empress Xiao Wen	Empress of China (Northeastern); 947?–951; With: Empress Xiao Sagezhi (950–951)	Succeeded by Empress Xiao (Muzong)
Preceded by Empress Liu of Later Tang	Empress of China (Beijing/Tianjin/Northern Hebei/Northern Shanxi); 947?–951; With: Empress Xiao Sagezhi (950–951)	Succeeded by Empress Xiao (Muzong)
