= Emperor Shizong of Liao =

Emperor of the Liao dynasty from 947 to 951

Emperor Shizong of Liao 遼世宗

Emperor of the Liao dynasty
- Reign: 16 May 947 – 7 October 951
- Predecessor: Emperor Taizong
- Successor: Emperor Muzong
- Born: Wuyu (Khitan name); Yelü Ruan (sinicised name); 29 January 919
- Died: 7 October 951 (aged 32)
- Burial: Xianling Mausoleum (顯陵, alongside his father; in present-day Beizhen, Jinzhou, Liaoning)
- Spouse: Empress Zhen; Empress Xiao
Names
- Family name: Yēlǜ (耶律); Khitan given name: Wùyù (兀欲); Sinicised given name: Ruǎn (阮)
Era name and dates
- Tianlu (天祿): 947–951
Regnal name
- Emperor Tianshou (天授皇帝)
Posthumous name
- Emperor Xiaohe Zhuangxian (孝和莊憲皇帝)
Temple name
- Shizong (世宗)
- House: Yelü
- Dynasty: Liao
- Father: Yelü Bei
- Mother: Empress Dowager Xiao

Emperor Shizong of Liao
- Traditional Chinese: 遼世宗
- Simplified Chinese: 辽世宗
Transcriptions
Standard Mandarin
- Hanyu Pinyin: Liáo Shìzōng

Wuyu (Khitan name)
- Chinese: 兀欲
Transcriptions
Standard Mandarin
- Hanyu Pinyin: Wùyù

Yelü Ruan
- Chinese: 耶律阮
Transcriptions
Standard Mandarin
- Hanyu Pinyin: Yēlǜ Ruǎn

Emperor Shizong of Liao (29 January 919 – 7 October 951), personal name Wuyu, sinicised name Yelü Ruan, was the third emperor of the Khitan-led Liao dynasty of China. He was the son of Yelü Bei, the eldest son of Abaoji (Emperor Taizu), the founder of the Liao dynasty. He ascended to the imperial throne in 947 after the death of his uncle, Emperor Taizong, who raised him in his father's absence.

== Ascension ==
Emperor Taizong was on campaign in China when he died in 947. Yelü Ruan accompanied him on this campaign, allowing him to quickly gain the support of the military leaders. While returning to the capital, his grandmother, Empress Dowager Yingtian, had plotted to have her third son, Yelü Lihu, ascend to the throne, and sent an army to intercept her grandson. She had denounced Yelü Ruan in her campaign to support her son. However, the Khitan nobles, knowing that Yelü Lihu was entirely unfit for the throne, refused to support her this time as they did previously with the ascension of Emperor Taizong. The strong support the Liao imperial court gave to Yelü Ruan's claim prevented a civil war among the Khitans.

== Reign ==
Emperor Shizong was known both for his generosity as well as for his martial prowess. This generosity was not extended to either his grandmother or his uncle (Yelü Lihu) both of whom were sent far from the capital by Emperor Shizong. Both died soon afterward, Yelü Lihu in rebellion and Empress Dowager Yingtian of old age.

Emperor Shizong took to the field in 951 in a successful effort to resist Chinese advances from the south. However, a mere four years after his ascension as emperor, he was killed by a rebellious nephew who was part of an effort within the imperial clan to usurp the throne.

During his reign, Emperor Shizong adopted several reforms that propelled the Liao dynasty into a feudal society and consolidated power into a central government. However, Emperor Shizong was also a drunkard and liked to hunt. On a night in September 951, Emperor Taizong's cousin Yelü Chage (耶律察割) mutinied and killed Emperor Shizong and Empress Zhen in a coup, at the age of 33 years old and had reigned for only three years.

== Family ==
Consort and issue(s):

- Empress, of the Zhen clan (皇后 甄氏, 905 – 951); a former court lady of Later Tang
  - Yelü Zhimo, Prince of Ning (耶律只沒 寧王, d. 983), 3rd son
- Empress Huaijie, of the Xiao clan (?–951) (懷節皇后 蕭氏, d. 951); personal name Sagezhi (撒葛只), Shulü Ping's niece
  - Yelü Houabu, the Crown Prince Zhuangsheng (耶律吼阿不 莊聖皇太子), 1st son
  - Yelü Xian, Emperor Jingzong (遼景宗 耶律賢, 1 September 948 – 13 October 982), 2nd son
  - Princess of Qin State (秦國公主), personal name Hegudian (和古典), 1st daughter
    - Married Xiao Chuoli (蕭啜里)
  - Princess of Jin State (晉國公主), personal name Guanyin (觀音), 2nd daughter
    - Married Xiao Xiala (蕭夏剌)
  - Princess of Menggu State (萌古公主, b. 950), personal name Sala (撒剌), 3rd daughter
    - Married Xiao Woli (蕭斡里)
- Consort Chuoli (?–971) (啜里) – No issue.
- Consort Puge (?–971) (浦哥) – No issue.

Emperor Shizong of Liao House of Yelü (916–1125) Born: 919 Died: 951
Regnal titles
Preceded by Emperor Taizong	Emperor of the Liao Dynasty; 947–951	Succeeded by Emperor Muzong
Preceded by Emperor Taizong	Emperor of China (Kaifeng region); 947	Succeeded by Li Congyi
Preceded by Emperor Taizong	Emperor of China (Northern/Central); 947	Succeeded by Liu Zhiyuan of Later Han
