= Abaoji =

Emperor of the Liao dynasty from 916 to 926

Emperor Taizu of Liao 遼太祖

Emperor of the Khitan Empire
- Reign: 916–926
- Predecessor: Dynasty established
- Successor: Emperor Taizong
- Born: Abaoji (阿保機); 872; Xialaiyishilie Township, Diela Tribe
- Died: 6 September 926 (aged 53–54); Fuyu, Khitan Empire
- Burial: Zuling Mausoleum (祖陵, in present-day Bairin Left Banner, Inner Mongolia)
- Spouse: Empress Shulü
Names
- Family name: Yēlǜ (耶律); Khitan given name: Abaoji (阿保機); Sinicised family name: Liu (劉); Sinicised given name: Yi (億)
Era dates
- Shence (神冊): 916–922; Tianzan (天贊): 922–926; Tianxian (天顯): 926
Regnal name
- Emperor Dasheng Daming Tian (大聖大明天皇帝)
Posthumous name
- Emperor Dàshèng Dàmíng Shénliè Tiān (大聖大明神烈天皇帝), shortly Emperor Tiān (天皇帝 or 天帝)
Temple name
- Tàizŭ (太祖)
- House: Yelü
- Dynasty: Liao
- Father: Yelü Saladi
- Mother: Xiao Yanmujin

Abaoji
- Traditional Chinese: 阿保機
- Simplified Chinese: 阿保机
Transcriptions
Standard Mandarin
- Hanyu Pinyin: Ābǎojī
- Wade–Giles: A-pao-chi

Emperor Taizu of Liao
- Traditional Chinese: 遼太祖
- Simplified Chinese: 辽太祖
Transcriptions
Standard Mandarin
- Hanyu Pinyin: Liáo Tàizŭ
- Wade–Giles: Liao T'ai-tsu

Yelü Yi (sinicised name)
- Traditional Chinese: 耶律億
- Simplified Chinese: 耶律亿
Transcriptions
Standard Mandarin
- Hanyu Pinyin: Yēlǜ Yì

Liu Yi (sinicised name)
- Traditional Chinese: 劉億
- Simplified Chinese: 刘亿
Transcriptions
Standard Mandarin
- Hanyu Pinyin: Liú Yì

Abaoji (872 – 6 September 926), posthumously known by his temple name as the Emperor Taizu of Liao, was a Khitan leader and the first emperor of the Khitan Empire, ruling from 916 to 926. He had a sinicised name, Yelü Yi (with Khitan family name kept) or Liu Yi; some sources suggest that Abaoji's family name, Yelü, was adopted during his lifetime, although there is no consensus amongst historians on this point.

Abaoji was born in 872 in Southern Mongolia and had a turbulent childhood. His grandfather was killed in a conflict between tribes, and his father and uncles fled. He was hidden by his grandmother for his safety. He became khagan of the Khitans on 27 February 907, and was subsequently enthroned as emperor in 916, proclaiming his own era name. He died on 6 September 926. He was responsible for the conquest and unification of all of Inner Mongolia, northern China and southern Manchuria. After the Khitan Empire became the Liao dynasty in 942, Abaoji was posthumously considered a Liao emperor.

== Legends surrounding Abaoji's birth ==
Later generations of Chinese historians record a variety of legends that surrounded the birth of Abaoji. According to the legends, his mother Xiao Yanmujin dreamt that the sun fell from the sky and into her bosom, from which her pregnancy followed. When she gave birth, the room was said to have become filled with a mysterious light and extraordinary fragrance. As a newborn, Abaoji's body was said to be that of a three-year-old, and the legends go on to say that he was walking at the age of three months. He was even recorded as being able to see events before they occurred.

== Rise to power ==
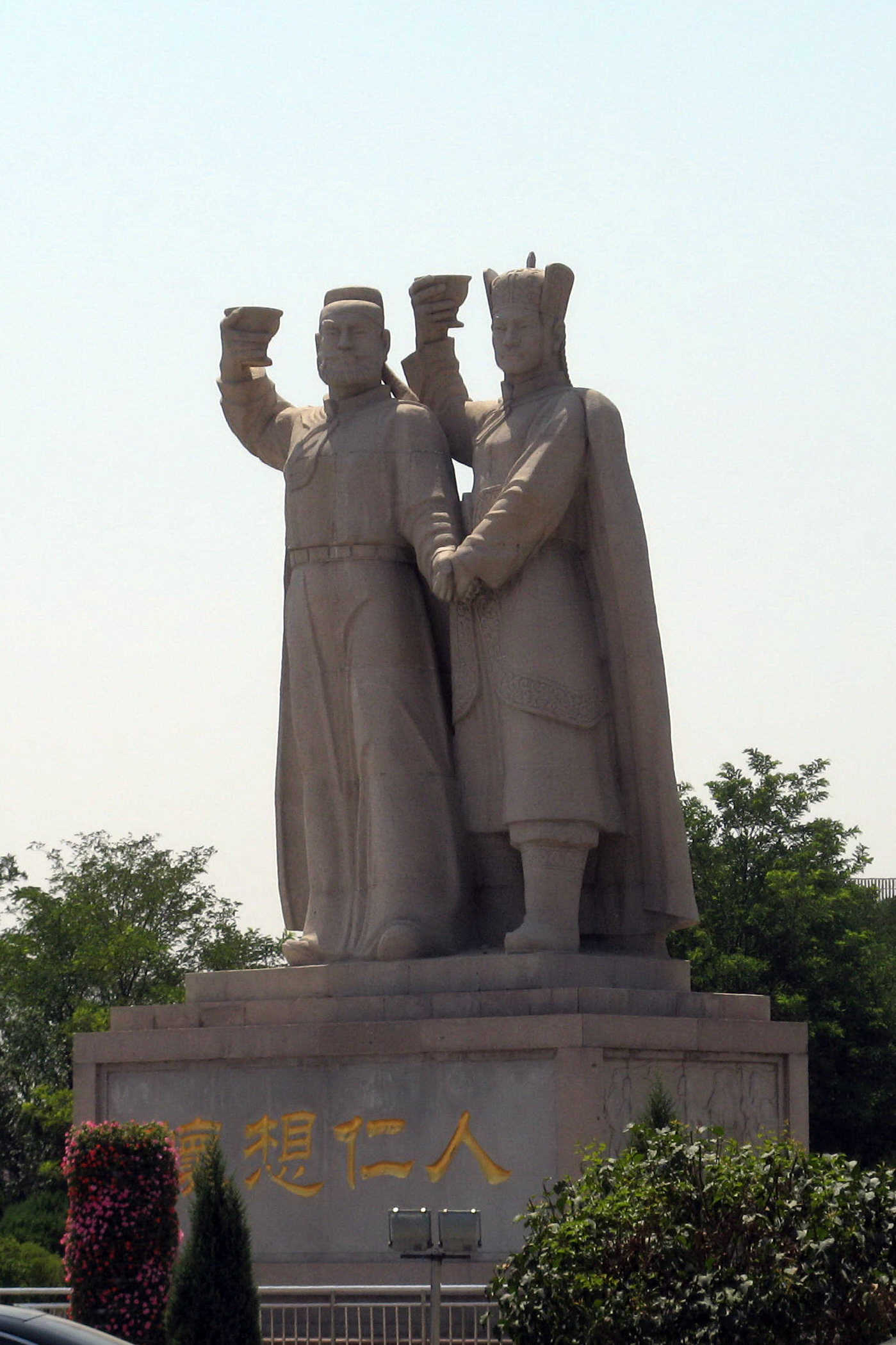
Statues in Huairen County, Shanxi, China, commemorating Abaoji and Li Keyong's meeting in 907

The location of the Khitans in relation to the other neighbouring tribes is of importance. The Khitans resided on the east slope of the Greater Khingan Mountains. West of the mountains were other nomadic pastoral tribes such as the Shiwei and the Xi, along with the Turkic Uighur tribe. These other tribes had inter-married with the Khitans. Further west were the Tatars, a warlike tribe on the Mongolian Plateau. East and north-east lay the Jurchens all the way to the Amur river. They were a peaceful people who resided in small villages and subsisted by hunting and fishing. Across the Liao River to the east and south-east as far as the Yalu River lay the Balhae people, the majority of whom comprised a settled agricultural society.

The Yaonian clan had dominated the leadership of the Khitan tribes since the 750s. They maintained good relations with the Tang dynasty to the south. However, by the end of the ninth century, leaders of the powerful Yila tribe were expressing dissatisfaction with the Yaonian khans. Abaoji's father had been the elected chieftain of the Yila tribe. As surnames were considered a marker of Han culture, they were not used by the Khitan people outside of the Yaonian imperial clan.

Abaoji became chieftain of the Yila tribe in 901, and in 903 he was named the Yuyue, commander of all of the Khitan military forces. This had the effect of making him second only to the great khan in the hierarchy of the Khitan state. He started making a name for himself in 905 when he led 70,000 cavalry into Shanxi to create a brotherhood with Li Keyong. Not only did he offer "brotherhood" but he pledged support against Zhu Wen. This showed that he was willing to be more aggressive than the Great Khan. In 907, he appeared at the triennial council and demanded to be named the khagan, the Khan of khans. His successes against the Han people in the north, against whom he had been raiding since 901, led to him receiving the support of seven tribal chiefs and even the acquiescence of the last Yaonian Great Khan.

From 907 until 916, Abaoji was beset with constant uprisings and rebellions, mostly instigated by his own family members (cousins and brothers). He eventually won them over by persuading them that they could become more successful as a dynasty. With his walled city showing off the tribe's wealth and power, he appointed all the usurpers to positions of influence which placated them. Abaoji's skilful manipulation of his enemies allowed him to increase his own and his tribe's power.

== Legacy ==
Abaoji's ongoing success was due to his ability to introduce innovations to Khitan society. Arguably the most important was the introduction of a dual administrative system in which nomadic steppe peoples would be governed by steppe traditions while sedentary populations in conquered Balhae and north China would be governed by a civil bureaucracy run largely on Han protocols. While this did not receive universal support from tribal leaders due to the erosion of their own powers, this became the model that later steppe peoples would use to govern their diverse empires.

Two other important innovations were introduced in 916. He adopted Han court formalities in which he declared himself Celestial Emperor in the Han style and adopted an era name, also in the Han manner of ruling. The second was to name his son, Yelü Bei, as his heir apparent, also a first in Khitan society and something that directly contrasted with Khitan notions of rule by merit. This second innovation did not take hold easily as only a few of his successors experienced simple successions.

He also organised his followers into warrior units known as orda, and then by joining 12 ordas together, he formed an administrative district.

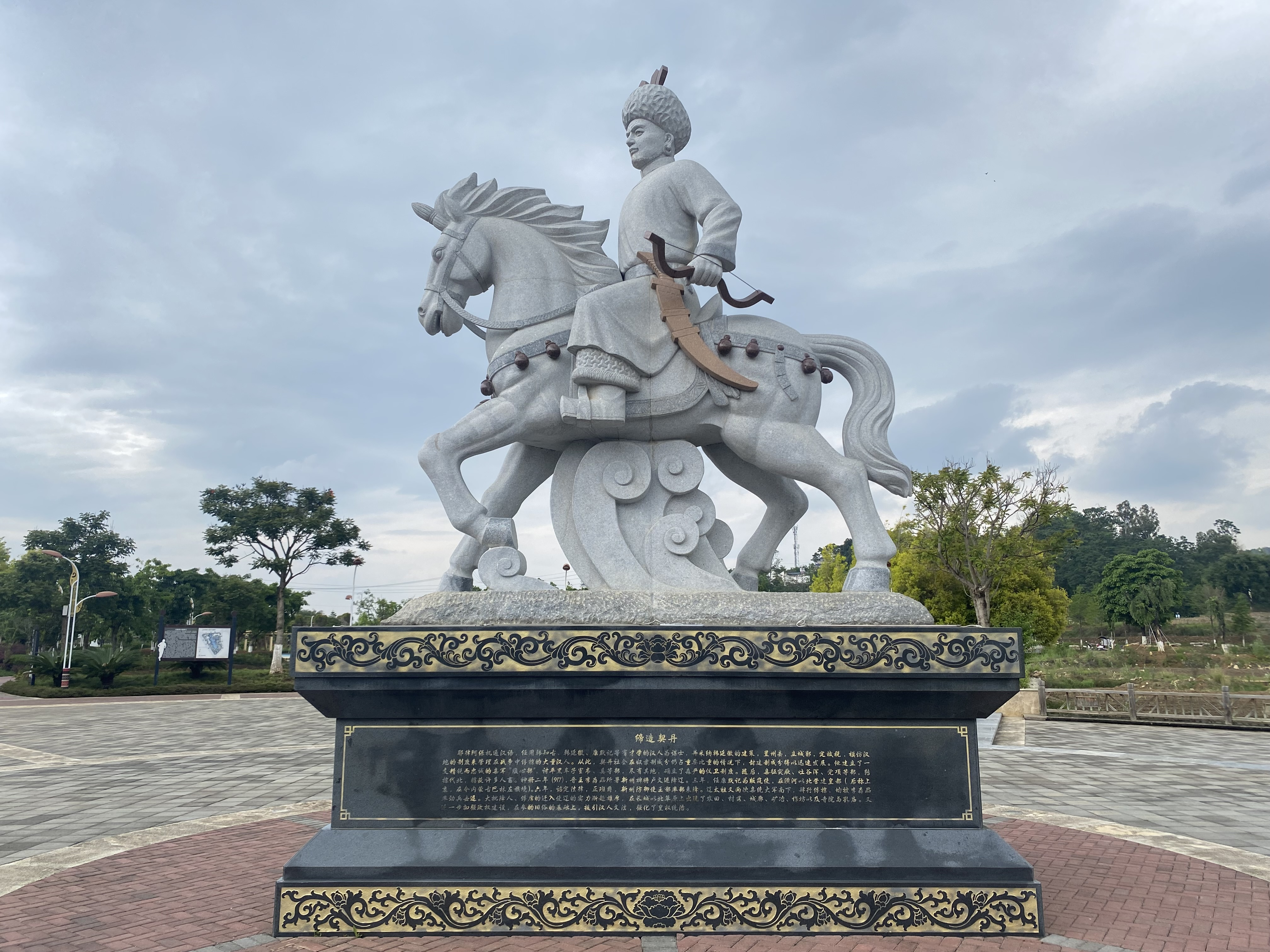
Statue of Yelü Abaoji at Taiyang Lake Park, Chifeng City, Inner Mongolia, China

In 918, Abaoji had a new walled city built. A Chinese city was built adjacent to this city in which artisans' shops, commercial shops and warehouses were constructed. Later, five capital cities would be built, including a Supreme Capital (上京), that served as the base of Khitan administration.

Abaoji ordered the development of a Khitan large script in 920. This script looks superficially like Chinese writing. However, it bears little resemblance to Chinese writing, and the two were mutually unintelligible. Five years later, the arrival of a Uyghur delegation led Abaoji to order his younger brother, Yelü Diela, to develop a new script on more syllabic principles. Unlike the Japanese and Koreans, the Khitans managed to adopt the cultural and administrative tool of writing without the baggage of Han culture and grammar that came with the wholesale adoption of Chinese characters.

By the time he died of typhoid fever at the age of 54, Abaoji had captured the entire Balhae state, keeping their ruling family as nobility ruling his new fiefdom. His eastern boundaries were the Yalu River and the Ussuri River. His westward progression had gone far onto the Mongolian Plateau. By the time of his death, he had not acted on his plan to move south.

== Relationship with the Later Tang ==
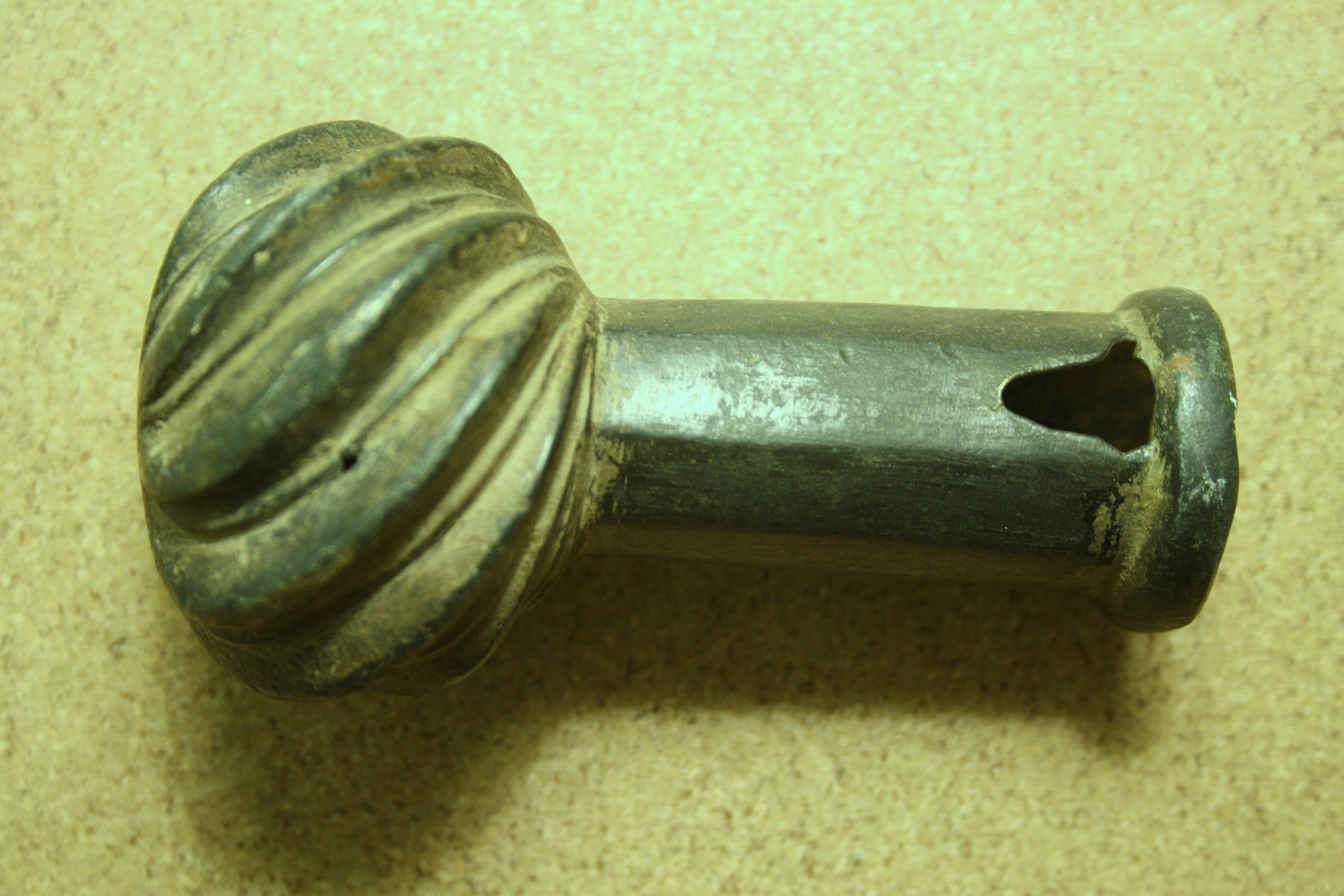
Hammer, Liao dynasty

Li Cunxu, the son of Li Keyong, who had formed a bond with Abaoji back in 905, founded the Later Tang on the ashes of the Later Liang in 923. On Li Cunxu's death, though relations between the two had soured, the proper forms were followed and an emissary was sent to the Khitan capital. The souring of relations occurred probably due to the aggressiveness of Abaoji, as in 922 and 923 he had led an army deep into Hebei, looting and taking prisoners along the way. This was in essence Later Tang territory.

=== Yao Kun ===
Yao Kun was sent by the Later Tang court to meet with Abaoji in 926. He caught up with the Khitan ruler in Manchuria while he was on campaign against the Balhae kingdom and while he was encamped at Fuyu in present-day Jilin Province. Abaoji demanded that the Later Tang surrender the Sixteen Prefectures. If they were given up, there would be no reason for Abaoji to invade China proper. Yao Kun stated that this demand was not in his power to grant. This response landed Yao Kun in prison, where he still was when Abaoji died from illness on 6 September 926.

== Succession ==
Though Yelü Bei was designated heir apparent in 916, the empress dowager Shulü Ping did not consider him to be worthy and managed to have her second son Deguang succeed to the throne. Deguang became known to history as Emperor Taizong and he reigned from 926 to 947.

== Family ==
Consort and issue(s):

- Empress Chunqin, of the Xiao clan (淳欽皇后 蕭氏, 19 October 879 – 1 August 953), personal name Shulü Ping (述律平)
  - Yelü Zhigu (耶律質古; d. 911), 1st daughter
    - Married Xiao Shilu (蕭室魯), half-nephew of Shülu Ping
  - Yelü Bei, Emperor Yizong (遼義宗 耶律倍, 889 – 7 January 937), 1st son
  - Yelü Deguang, Emperor Taizong (遼太宗 耶律德光, 25 November 902 – 18 May 947 ), 2nd son
  - Yelü Lihu, Emperor Zhangsu (章肅皇帝 耶律李胡, 911– 960), 3rd son
- Palace lady, of the Xiao clan (宮人 蕭氏)
  - Yelü Yaliguo (耶律牙里果), 4th son

== See also ==
- Liao dynasty
- Song dynasty
- Khitan
- Yelu clan
- Ambaghai khan of the Khamag Mongol

== Footnotes ==
Abaoji House of Yelü (916–1125) Born: 872 Died: 926
Regnal titles
Preceded by Dynasty created	Emperor of the Khitan; 916–926	Succeeded by Emperor Taizong of Liao
Preceded by Emperor Ai of Tang	Emperor of China (Eastern Inner Mongolia); 916–926	Succeeded by Emperor Taizong of Liao
