= Emperor Taizong of Liao =

Liao dynasty emperor of China from 927 to 947

Emperor Taizong of Liao 遼太宗

Emperor of the Liao dynasty
- Reign: 11 December 927 – 18 May 947
- Predecessor: Emperor Taizu
- Successor: Emperor Shizong
- Born: Yaogu (Khitan name); Yelü Deguang (sinicised name); 25 November 902
- Died: 18 May 947 (aged 44)
- Burial: Huailing Mausoleum (懷陵, in present-day Bairin Right Banner, Inner Mongolia)
- Spouse: Empress Xiao
- Issue: Emperor Muzong of Liao; Yelü Yanchege, Crown Prince (Imperial Uncle) Qinjing
Names
- Family name: Yēlǜ (耶律); Khitan given name: Yáogǔ (堯骨); Sinicised given name: Déguāng (德光)
Era dates
- Tianxian (天顯): 927–938; Huitong (會同): 938–947; Datong (大同): 947
Regnal name
- Emperor Sisheng (嗣聖皇帝)
Posthumous name
- Emperor Xiaowu Huiwen (孝武惠文皇帝)
Temple name
- Taizong (太宗)
- House: Yelü
- Dynasty: Liao
- Father: Emperor Taizu
- Mother: Empress Shulü

Emperor Taizong of Liao
- Traditional Chinese: 遼太宗
- Simplified Chinese: 辽太宗
Transcriptions
Standard Mandarin
- Hanyu Pinyin: Liáo Tàizōng

Yaogu (Khitan name)
- Traditional Chinese: 堯骨
- Simplified Chinese: 尧骨
Transcriptions
Standard Mandarin
- Hanyu Pinyin: Yáogǔ

Yelü Deguang (sinicised name)
- Chinese: 耶律德光
Transcriptions
Standard Mandarin
- Hanyu Pinyin: Yēlǜ Déguāng

Dejin (courtesy name)
- Traditional Chinese: 德謹
- Simplified Chinese: 德谨
Transcriptions
Standard Mandarin
- Hanyu Pinyin: Déjǐn

Emperor Taizong of Liao (25 November 902 – 18 May 947), personal name Yaogu, sinicised name Yelü Deguang, courtesy name Dejin, was the second emperor of the Khitan-led Liao dynasty of China.

== Background ==
Yelü Deguang was born in 902, before the founding of the Liao dynasty. His father was the Yelü clan chieftain Yelü Abaoji, and his mother was Yelü Abaoji's wife Shulü Ping; he was their second son. As a young adult, he was described by the History of Liao as serious in his appearance and kind in his disposition, and often participating in his parents' governance of the state.

In 922, by which time Yelü Abaoji was the emperor of the Liao dynasty, Yelü Deguang was given the title of Generalissimo of All Forces (天下兵馬大元帥, Tianxia Bingma Da Yuanshuai), and he was put in charge of commanding incursions into the territory of Khitan's southern neighbor Former Jin. In 923, under him, Liao forces captured Jin's Ping Prefecture (平州, in modern Qinhuangdao, Hebei), and also defeated the Huxun Tribe (胡遜) of the Xi. It was said that he later followed Emperor Taizu in defeating the Khitan Jueli Tribes (厥里), forcing the submission of the Dangxiang tribes in the Ordos Loop region, conquering the garrisons of the Hexi Corridor region, capturing the capital of the Gansu Uyghur Kingdom, defeating Balhae, and destroying the Dalugu Tribes (達盧骨).

In 926, Emperor Taizu decided to conquer Balhae. In a campaign, he captured the important Balhae city Fuyu (夫餘, in modern Siping, Jilin). (This appeared to have ended the Balhae state, even though Emperor Taizu did not at this time capture Balhae's capital Longquan.) Emperor Taizu set up a Dongdan Kingdom over the old Balhae territory, with its capital at Fuyu, and made Yelü Deguang's older brother Yelü Bei its king, with the title of "Imperial King of Man" (人皇王, Ren Huangwang), echoing the titles used by himself ("Imperial Emperor of Heaven," 天皇帝, Tian Huangdi) and his wife (Yelü Bei's mother) Empress Shulü ("Imperial Empress of Earth," 地皇后, Di Huanghou). He gave Yelü Deguang the title of "Generalissimo Crown Prince" and made Yelü Deguang in charge of the Liao capital Linhuang (臨潢), which Yelü Bei had previously been in charge of.

Shortly after conquering Fuyu, however, Emperor Taizu fell ill and died while still at Fuyu. Empress Shulü took over effective leadership of the Liao dynasty, and she and Yelü Bei began the trek of escorting Emperor Taizu's casket back to Linhuang, leaving one of Emperor Taizu's younger brother Yelü Anduan (耶律安端) temporarily in charge at Dongdan. Once then returned to Linhuang, she wanted to divert the succession away from Yelü Bei, as she had favored Yelü Deguang. However, formally, she called an assembly of the chieftains, along with Yelü Bei and Yelü Deguang, and stated to them, "I love both of my sons, and I do not know which one to make emperor. You can decide which one you wish to support by holding his rein." The chieftains, knowing that she favored Yelü Deguang, rushed to him and held to his rein. She thereafter declared him emperor (as Emperor Taizong). Yelü Bei, angry over this turn of events, took several hundred soldiers and wanted to flee to Later Tang (Jin's successor state), but was intercepted by Liao border guards. Empress Shulü did not punish him, but sent him to Dongdan.

== Initial years of reign ==
Emperor Taizong honored his mother Empress Shulü as empress dowager, and created his wife Lady Xiao Wen, who was a niece of Empress Shulü's, empress. It was said that he was filially pious toward his mother, such that if the empress dowager were ill and unable to eat, he would also not eat, and that if his mother were displeased at him, he would not dare to meet her until her temper had been soothed.

In 930, Emperor Taizong created his younger brother Yelü Lihu crown prince. Later in the year, apparently in reaction to being bypassed again, Yelü Bei fled from Dongdan to Khitan's southern neighbor Later Tang (Jin's successor state).

In 935, Empress Xiao, after giving birth to her and Emperor Taizong's second son Yelü Yansage (耶律罨撒葛), fell ill and died. There would not be another empress during the rest of Emperor Taizong's reign.

== Overlordship over Later Jin ==
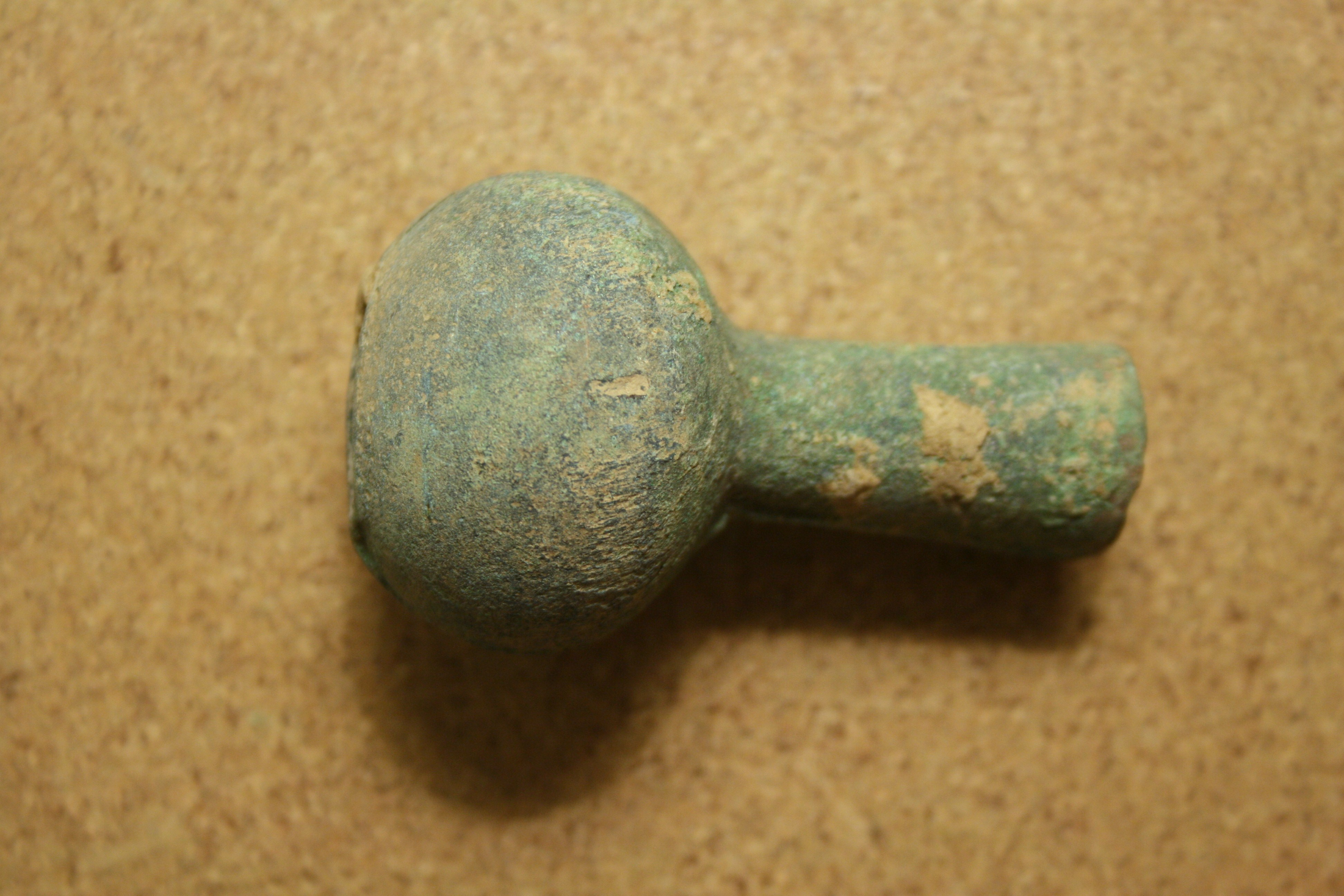
Hammer, Liao dynasty

=== During Later Jin's establishment ===
As of 936, Later Tang was embroiled in internal strife, as then-emperor Li Congke was suspicious that his brother-in-law Shi Jingtang the military governor (Jiedushi) of Hedong Circuit (河東, headquartered in modern Taiyuan, Shanxi), would rebel against him. At the advice of the imperial scholars Li Song and Lü Qi (呂琦), Li Congke considered entering an alliance with the Khitan to ward off the possibility that Shi would seek aid from Khitan. However, when another imperial scholar, Xue Wenyu (薛文遇), argued against it by predicting that Emperor Taizong would demand a marriage alliance, Li Congke changed his mind and never made the alliance proposal.

Not long after, in summer 936, Li Congke, under Xue's suggestion, issued an edict moving Shi from Hedong to Tianping Circuit (天平, headquartered in modern Tai'an, Shandong). This caused Shi to fear that he would be executed if he left Hedong, and so he rebelled. With Li Congke then sending an army, commanded by Zhang Jingda, to attack Hedong, Shi sent emissaries to Khitan to request aid, promising that, if Emperor Taizong would support him as the emperor of China, to serve Emperor Taizong as a father and to cede Lulong Circuit (盧龍, headquartered in modern Beijing) and Hedong's prefectures north of the Yanmen Pass to Khitan. When Shi's emissaries arrived at the Khitan court, Emperor Taizong was pleased, and he stated to Empress Dowager Shulü, "Your son had dreamt that Master Shi would be sending messengers here. Now it has happened. This was the will of heaven." He sent a reply that he would lead his entire empire's forces to aid Shi in the fall.

Meanwhile, Zhang put Hedong's capital Taiyuan under siege. Taiyuan was running low on food supplies, but its defenses held. In late fall, Emperor Taizong himself commanded 50,000 cavalry soldiers (but claimed publicly that it was 300,000) and headed for Taiyuan. When he arrived at Taiyuan's outskirts, Shi urged caution and not immediate engagement, but Emperor Taizong did not listen. Rather, he engaged Zhang's army immediately, crushing it and lifting the siege on Taiyuan. The remnants of Zhang's army took up position at Jin'an Base (晉安寨), near Taiyuan, but the combined Khitan/Hedong forces then put it under siege. While continuing to siege the Later Tang forces at Jin'an, Emperor Taizong created Shi emperor, having his state known as Jin (referred to by later historians as Later Jin. As part of Shi's enthronement announcement, he announced the agreement to cede Lulong and parts of Hedong, for a total of 16 prefectures, to Khitan, as well as to submit a large amount of silk each year as tribute.

Li Congke ordered Zhao Dejun the military governor of Lulong to command another army to rescue Zhang at Jin'an, but Zhao himself wanted Emperor Taizong's support to be emperor of China, and therefore halted some distance away at Tuanbo Valley (團柏谷, in modern Jinzhong, Shanxi), while he sent secret emissaries to Emperor Taizong's camp, negotiating with him. Zhao, who submitted bribes of gold and silk to Emperor Taizong, promised the terms of being fraternal states with Khitan and that Shi would be allowed to retain Hedong. As Zhao's army was still a strong one, Emperor Taizong was enticed. Shi, hearing of this, sent his close advisor Sang Weihan to plead with Emperor Taizong, arguing that the Khitan/Later Jin forces would prevail and that he should not turn his back on Shi. Emperor Taizong, after consideration, agreed with Sang and rejected Zhao's overture.

After Jin'an had been under siege for three months and ran out of supplies, Zhang's deputy Yang Guangyuan assassinated Zhang and surrendered the remaining Later Tang army, which Emperor Taizong turned over to Shi. Then they began to march toward the Later Tang capital Luoyang. With Yang having surrendered, Zhao's army lost its morale and also collapsed, and Zhao surrendered. At that time, Li Congke, who had himself led another Later Tang relief force northward, decided to return to Luoyang, but once he returned to Luoyang saw that the morale was crumbling and that many more generals were already surrendering to the combined Khitan/Later Jin forces. Emperor Taizong escorted Shi to Lu Prefecture (潞州, in modern Changzhi, Shanxi), and then, citing his belief that the Han Chinese would panic if Khitan forces actually arrived at Luoyang, stayed at Lu while Shi approached Luoyang. Li Congke, finding the situation hopeless, committed suicide with his family. Prior to the suicide, he had Emperor Taizong's older brother Yelü Bei executed. Shi entered Luoyang and established his authority there. He had Yelü Bei's casket escorted with honor back to Khitan.

=== After Later Jin's takeover of central China ===
Emperor Taizong returned to Khitan proper with a number of Later Tang generals that he had detained. He also established Lulong's capital You Prefecture (幽州) as the southern capital, to facilitate the governance of the newly received 16 prefectures. He respected the captured official Zhang Li and listened to much of Zhang's advice.

In 937, Xu Gao, the regent of Later Jin's southeastern neighbor Wu sent an emissary to Khitan to try to establish friendly relations. Emperor Taizong also sent an emissary to Wu in return. Later in the year, Emperor Taizong changed the name of his state from Khitan to Liao. He modeled his government after Chinese states', and made Zhao Dejun's son Zhao Yanshou a chief of staff (Shumishi) and chancellor. Later, after Xu seized the Wu throne and established Southern Tang as its emperor, he continued friendly relations with Liao, but on one occasion decided to assassinate the Liao emissary once the Liao emissary crossed into Later Jin territory, hoping to blame Later Jin for the assassination and disrupt Liao and Later Jin relations.

Meanwhile, Shi Jingtang, as Later Jin's emperor, continued to be very submissive to Liao. In 938, he offered honorific titles to Emperor Taizong and Empress Dowager Shulü, and sent his senior officials Feng Dao and Liu Xu to the Liao court to officially present the titles. During Shi's reign as Later Jin's emperor, he referred to himself as "subject" and "son," while referring to Emperor Taizong as "father emperor." Whenever Emperor Taizong issued edicts to him, he would receive them in a side hall rather than his own imperial hall, to show respect. Whenever at the Liao emperor's and empress dowager's birthdays or the deaths of key Liao officials, he would often present gifts, including also to Empress Dowager Shulü, Yelü Lihu, Yelü Anduan, the two chancellors in charge of Liao's southern and northern branches of government, and key Han officials such as Zhao Yanshou and Han Yanhui. Further, even when Emperor Taizong sent arrogantly-worded edicts, Shi would respond meekly. Therefore, throughout Shi's reign, there would be no disputes between Liao and Later Jin.

In late 938, Shi, fearing that Yang Guangyuan, then the military governor of Tianxiong Circuit (天雄, headquartered in modern Handan, Hebei), would be difficult to control, and therefore divided Tianxiong and moved Yang to be the military governor of Heyang Circuit (河陽, headquartered in modern Luoyang, Henan) and the defender of Luoyang. It was said that after this movement, Yang began to be resentful of the Later Jin imperial government and entered into secret communications with the Liao court.

In 939, fearing that An Chongrong the military governor of Chengde Circuit (成德, headquartered in modern Shijiazhuang, Hebei) would rebel, Shi moved An's potential ally Huangfu Yu (皇甫遇) the military governor of the neighboring Yiwu Circuit (義武, headquartered in modern Baoding, Hebei) to Zhaoyi Circuit (昭義, headquartered at Lu Prefecture). Emperor Taizong tried to use this opportunity to inject himself into the commissioning of Yiwu's military governor, proposing that the Liao official Wang Wei (王威), whose father Wang Chuzhi had previously ruled Yiwu in alliance with Later Tang's predecessor state Jin, be made Yiwu's military governor. When Shi refused (based on the rationale that Wang needed to go through several layers of promotions to qualify (from prefect to military prefect to defender to military governor), Emperor Taizong sent back the angry response of, "How many layers of promotion did you go through from being military governor to be the Son of Heaven?" Shi, in fear, sent a rich tribute and promised to make Wang Chuzhi's grandnephew Wang Tingyin (王廷胤) Yiwu's military governor. That somewhat placated Emperor Taizong.

An Chongrong, in addition to considering a rebellion against Later Jin, was particularly hostile to Liao. Whenever Liao emissaries passed through Chengde, he would curse them and sometimes even kill them. In 940, he seized a Liao emissary, and then submitted an arrogantly-worded petition to Shi, demanding that he terminate his submissiveness to Liao and turn against Liao for its mistreatment of the Chinese people. Sang secretly pointed out to Shi that turning against Liao could not yield any benefit — and, in his evaluation of Emperor Taizong, referred to Emperor Taizong as being "more intelligent and brave than other people." Shi listened to Sang, and instead tried to persuade An against provocative behaviors against Liao. He also sent Yang Yanxun (楊彥詢) the military governor of Anguo Circuit (安國, headquartered in modern Xingtai, Hebei) as an emissary to Liao, to explain to Emperor Taizong, who was angry over An's killing of Liao emissaries, to explain that An's provocative behavior did not reflect a chance in Later Jin's overall submission.

In winter 941, An Chongrong's ally, An Congjin the military governor of Shannan East Circuit (山南東道, headquartered in modern Xiangyang, Hubei) rebelled against Later Jin. Shortly after, An Chongrong, hearing of An Congjin's rise, also did so. The Later Jin army against An Chongrong, commanded by Shi's brother-in-law Du Chongwei, quickly defeated An Chongrong, and An Chongrong was killed by his own officers. Shi had An Chongrong's head delivered to Liao. (An Congjin, however, would not be destroyed until shortly after Shi's own death.)

Despite An Chongrong's defeat, Emperor Taizong continued to send emissaries to Later Jin, rebuking Shi for the fact that Tuyuhun tribesmen, whose grazing lands were part of the territory ceded by Later Jin to Liao, were often defecting from Liao back to Later Jin. It was said that this caused Shi much fear and caused him to fall ill. In summer 942, he died. After a discussion between Feng Dao and the Later Jin imperial guard general Jing Yanguang, they decided that the state needed an older emperor, so instead of supporting Shi's youngest and only surviving son Shi Chongrui (石重睿) as Later Jin's emperor, they supported his adoptive son and biological nephew Shi Chonggui, who was an adult, as Later Jin's emperor.

== Conflict with Later Jin ==
=== Initial deterioration of relations ===
Shortly after Shi Chonggui's succession to the Later Jin throne, the tone of the Liao-Later Jin relationship began to change, as Shi Chonggui, at Jing Yanguang's advice and against Li Song's, did not submit a petition but rather sent a letter to the Liao court to announce his succession, essentially declaring the states equal. Moreover, in the letter, he did not refer to himself as "subject" but only as "grandson." This caused Emperor Taizong to be angry and respond, "How do you dare not to first report to me before taking the throne?" Jing authored an insolent response on Shi's behalf. Thereafter, Zhao Yanshou, who was then Liao's military governor of Lulong, began to advocate that Emperor Taizong attack Later Jin, hoping that Emperor Taizong would replace Shi with Zhao himself. Emperor Taizong began to be enticed.

Meanwhile, Jing upped the hostility by arresting Qiao Rong (喬榮), the Liao commerce officer stationed at Later Jin's capital Kaifeng, and seizing Liao's commercial assets. Further, the Liao merchants were arrested and killed. When Qiao was released later in the year and allowed to return to Liao, Jing gave him an arrogant speech:

Tell your master: the deceased emperor [(i.e., Shi Jingtang)] was placed in his position by the northern dynasty [(i.e., Liao)], and that is why he claimed himself to be a subject and submitted reports. The current emperor was placed in his position by China itself. The only reason why he subordinated himself to the northern dynasty is that he did not forget the alliance the deceased emperor entered. It was enough for him to claim himself to be a grandson; there is no reason for him to claim himself to be a subject. The emperor of the northern dynasty should not be deluded by Zhao Yanshou such that he insults China. You have seen the soldiers and horses that China possesses. If the grandfather is angry, he can come and battle us. The grandson has 100,000 sharpened swords waiting for him. If he were defeated by his grandson, he would become the laughing stock of the entire world. Do not forget this!

As Qiao feared that Emperor Taizong would blame him for the loss of the Liao wealth, he flattered Jing and requested that Jing write his words down on paper. Jing had his secretary write down the words and give them to Qiao. When Qiao presented them to Emperor Taizong, Emperor Taizong was incensed, and therefore became resolute that he would attack Later Jin. He had the Later Jin emissaries detained at You Prefecture and refused to see them himself. Even though Sang Weihan repeatedly suggested that Shi Chonggui revert to subservience to Liao to avoid a war, Jing repeatedly stopped Shi from doing so.

By winter 943, Yang Guangyuan, who was then Later Jin's military governor of Pinglu Circuit (平盧, headquartered in modern Weifang, Shandong), was in a mutually-suspicious relationship with the Later Jin imperial government, and, while he had not yet rebelled, was in communication with Emperor Taizong, urging him to attack Later Jin due to Shi's defiant behavior. Emperor Taizong thereafter gave Zhao 50,000 soldiers from Lulong and Datong (大同, headquartered in modern Datong, Shanxi) Circuits, asking him to manage the campaign to capture central China, stating to him, "If you gained it, I will make you emperor." He also often stated to the Han people in pointing to Zhao, "This is your Lord."

=== Liao incursions into Later Jin territory ===
In spring 944, Emperor Taizong made a major incursion into Later Jin territory, using Zhao Yanshou and Zhao Yanzhao (趙延照) as his forward commanders. The Liao forces first captured Bei Prefecture (貝州, in modern Xingtai, Hebei), and then grouped near Yedu (鄴都, capital of the former Tianxiong Circuit). Shi Chonggui tried to respond diplomatically, but his emissaries could not get through the Liao army and reach Emperor Taizong to deliver his letters. He also sent a number of generals to respond, with Jing Yanguang in effective command of the overall operations, but also himself went to the frontline. The second Liao thrust, led by Yelü Andu toward Hedong, however, was repelled by Hedong's military governor Liu Zhiyuan. Later Jin's prefect of Bo Prefecture (博州, in modern Liaocheng, Shandong), Zhou Ru (周儒), who was in secret communications with Yang Guangyuan, surrendered Bo to Liao forces, and encouraged them to cross the Yellow River at Majiakou (馬家口, in modern Liaocheng), to join forces with Yang. Jing was convinced by Yan Kan (顏衎) the acting military governor of Tianping that if Liao forces were able to cross the river, disaster would ensue, so the Later Jin imperial forces concentrated on battling Liao forces at Majiakou to prevent them from successfully crossing, and were able to do so. In anger, Liao forces slaughtered Han civilians that they had captured, which led to fiercer resistance from the populace. Later in spring 944, the armies commanded by the two emperors confronted each other near Yedu, but did not engage each other. Eventually, the Liao forces withdrew, pillaging as it went along over Later Jin's territory north of the Yellow River. Yang led his own troops west from Pinglu's capital Qing Prefecture (青州), and tried to meet the Liao forces at the Yellow River, but by the time he reached there, Liao forces had already left. Shi then sent the imperial guard general Li Shouzhen to attack Yang, and in winter 944, Yang's son Yang Chengxun (楊承勳) put his father under house arrest and surrendered. (Yang Guangyuan was later secretly killed on Shi's orders.)

In winter 944, Emperor Taizong again made a major incursion into Later Jin territory, using Zhao Yanshou as his forward commander. Shi was initially going to lead the Later Jin army himself, but fell ill at that time. He sent a number of generals to try to cut off the Liao army movement, but then, in fear of the Liao army's strengths, pulled back to the Yedu region, allowing the Liao army to advance unimpeded to Yedu, pillaging the Later Jin territory as it went along. However, the Liao army then withdrew in spring 945. As the Liao army withdrew, Shi sent Du Wei (i.e., Du Chongwei, who changed his name to observe naming taboo for Shi) and Li in command of an army to give chase. They crossed into Liao territory and captured Qi (祁州) and Tai (泰州) (both in modern Baoding), but soon received news that the Liao army had turned around and was heading for them. They tried to withdraw, but became surrounded near Yangcheng (陽城, in modern Baoding). Du panicked and was reluctant to engage the Liao army, but at Fu Yanqing's advocacy, Fu, Zhang Yanze, Yao Yuanfu (藥元福), and Huangfu Yu (皇甫遇), attacked the Liao army fiercely, causing the Liao army to panic and flee. After Emperor Taizong was able to regroup at You, he caned each of the chieftains who were part of the operation several hundred times, with only Zhao Yanshou escaping punishment.

It was described that, by this point, the incessant Liao incursions were rendering Later Jin's imperial army fatigued and its border regions desolate. Liao itself had also suffered many casualties to its soldiers and animals, and the Khitan people tired of the campaigns. Empress Dowager Shulü tried to urge Emperor Taizong into a more conciliatory posture with Later Jin. Meanwhile, Sang Weihan, who had taken over much of the military responsibility from Jing by this point, also was urging Shi to take a reconciliatory approach. In summer 945, Shi sent the emissary Zhang Hui (張暉) to the Liao court, apologizing and begging forgiveness. Emperor Taizong responded, "Send Sang Weihan and Jing Yanguang to come see us, and cede the two circuits of Zhen (鎮州, i.e., Chengde, as Zhen was the capital of Chengde, now renamed Shunguo (順國)) and Ding (定州, i.e., Yiwu, as Ding was the capital of Yiwu) to us, then there will be peace." Shi found the response insulting, and cut off further communications. He considered an alliance with Goryeo's King Taejo against Liao, but then found out that Goryeo lacked the strength to attack Liao, and so abandoned the idea.

=== Liao's destruction of Later Jin ===
In 946, there were rumors that Zhao Yanshou was planning on defecting to Later Jin. This rumor was believed by the Later Jin chiefs of staff Li Song and Feng Yu. They had Du Wei write a letter to Zhao, encouraging him to do so, with the officer Zhao Xingshi (趙行實), who had previously served under Zhao Yanshou, delivering the letter. Zhao Yanshou wrote back (to try to lead Later Jin forces into a trap), stating, "I have long been in a foreign land, and I want to return to China. Please launch a major army to support me, so that I can pull myself out and return with it." Subsequently, under Emperor Taizong's orders, Liao's prefect of Ying Prefecture (瀛州, in modern Cangzhou, Hebei), Liu Yanzuo (劉延祚), also offered to defect to Later Jin. Shi thus put Du and Li Shouzhen in command of an army to attack north, with the stated objectives being to first recapture the prefectures previously ceded to Liao, and then to destroy Liao. When Du and Li advanced, though, they were met by a large army that Emperor Taizong personally commanded. The Liao army eventually surrounded the Later Jin army at Zhongdu Bridge (中度橋, in modern Baoding). After Emperor Taizong made the promise to Du to make him emperor if he surrendered, Du and Li surrendered their army. Emperor Taizong had Zhao comfort the Later Jin soldiers and told him that the Later Jin army was now his, and then prepared to advance south. With virtually the entire Later Jin army having been given to Du and Li for this northern campaign, then-Later Jin capital Daliang was left essentially defenseless, and Shi Chonggui felt compelled to surrender, ending Later Jin. Emperor Taizong subsequently entered Daliang.

== Temporary rule over central China ==
Emperor Taizong declared himself the emperor of China as well, reneging on his promises to Zhao Yanshou and Du Chongwei. He gave Shi Chonggui the title of Marquess of Fuyi (i.e., "marquess who turned against righteousness) and moved Shi and Shi's family to a desolate part of Liao proper, away from Shi's old realm. Nearly all of Later Jin's officials and military governors submitted petitions to him, acknowledging him as emperor, except for two circuits on the western periphery, whose military governors Shi Kuangwei (史匡威) and He Chongjian (何重建) refused to accept Liao rule. Fearing of the strength that the old Later Jin imperial army still possessed, he considered slaughtering the soldiers, but as Zhao pointed out that doing so would merely open the Later Jin realms open to attack and occupation by Later Jin's southwestern neighbor Later Shu and southeastern neighbor Southern Tang, he decided against the idea. He kept the Later Jin military governors who came to Daliang to pay him homage at Daliang, while commissioning a number of Liao generals (of both Khitan and Han ethnicities) to take over the circuits. Believing that his rule was firm, he spent much time feasting, and he stated to the former Later Jin officials, "We know everything there is to know about China, but you know nothing about our land." To congratulate him for this great victory, Empress Dowager Shulü sent wine, delicacies, and fruits from Khitan lands to Daliang. Whenever he drank the wine that she sent, he stood up and stated, "This was bestowed by the Empress Dowager. I do not dare to drink it sitting down."

However, in this jubilation, Emperor Taizong then carried out acts that alienated the people of the land that he just conquered. When Zhao pointed out that tax revenues needed to be collected to supply the Liao soldiers that came with Emperor Taizong, Emperor Taizong responded, "Our land has no such customs." Rather, he sent out the Liao soldiers into the countryside to pillage it, referring to it as "threshing the grass seeds" (打草穀). This caused many deaths of Han adults, and the Han young and old were forced to hide themselves in trenches to avoid the same fate. It was said that all civilian wealth and animals in a region that included Daliang and Luoyang, and Zheng (鄭州, in modern Zhengzhou, Henan), Hua (滑州, in modern Anyang, Henan), Cao (曹州, in modern Heze, Shandong), and Pu (濮州, in modern Puyang, Henan) were all destroyed. He also ordered that all in the capital, as well as in prefectures that he sent emissaries to, force the populace to turn over their wealths so that they could be (ostensibly) rewarded to the Liao soldiers, but in reality he planned to transport back to Liao proper. This led to resentment among the Han, and growing sentiment to expel the Liao forces.

One of the leading Later Jin military governors who, while submitting to Liao, did not go to Daliang to pay homage to him, was Liu Zhiyuan the military governor of Hedong, who made excuses to stay at Taiyuan but who also did not immediately declare resistance to Liao. Emperor Taizong tried to get him to commit by sending emissaries to him to award him a cane (which was only matched by what Emperor Taizong awarded to Yelü Anduan, as the emperor's uncle) and also having the emissaries state to him, "You did not serve the southern dynasty [(i.e., Later Jin, as Liu, while outwardly a vassal of Shi Chonggui's, made no attempt to save him)], and now you are not serving the northern dynasty [(i.e., Liao)]. What are you intending?" Meanwhile, Gao Conghui, the ruler of the semi-independent state of Jingnan, submitted tributes to Emperor Taizong, and Emperor Taizong sent awards of horses in return, but Gao also sent emissaries to Liu, encouraging him to declare himself emperor in resistance to Liao. Southern Tang's emperor Li Jing also sent emissaries to Emperor Taizong, congratulating him on destroying Later Jin, and requesting permission to send construction workers to repair the tombs of Tang emperors (as Li Jing claimed to be the legitimate successor to Tang). Emperor Taizong refused, but still sent emissaries to Southern Tang in response.

Meanwhile, with the original Later Jin-commissioned military governors no longer at their circuits, many circuits began to raise in rebellion against Liao, starting with Baoyi Circuit (保義, headquartered in modern Sanmenxia, Henan), whose officers assassinated the Liao-commissioned deputy military governor Liu Yuan (劉願) and supported one of their own, Zhao Hui (趙暉), in rebellion against Liao. Not long after, Liu Zhiyuan declared himself emperor at Hedong (initially without a new name for his state, but later known as Later Han. After Liu's declaration of himself as emperor, many of the circuits resisting Liao pledged allegiance to him. This included many agrarian rebels, causing Emperor Taizong to lament, "I did not know that the Chinese people are this difficult to rule." He sent some of the military governors back to their circuits with Liao soldiers escorting them, but was unable to stem these rebellions.

In late spring, tired of dealing with these rebellions, Emperor Taizong convened the officials at Daliang, stating to them, "It is soon to be summer. It is not easy for me to remain. Let me return to the greater empire [(i.e., Liao proper)] for me to pay homage to the Empress Dowager. I will leave a trusted person here to be the military governor." He prepared to take the entire Later Jin imperial administration's officials with him, but there were those who advised him that doing that may cause the situation at Daliang to go out of control, so he took only the highly honored officials with him, while leaving the rest at Daliang. He commissioned his brother-in-law (Empress Xiao Wen's brother) Xiao Han as the military governor of Xuanwu Circuit (宣武, headquartered at Daliang), and left Xiao in charge of Daliang, while withdrawing from Daliang himself.

== Attempt to return to Liao proper and Death ==
As Emperor Taizong withdrew, as he crossed the Yellow River, he lamented, "When I was at the greater empire, I was pleased to shoot and hunt. I am, instead, saddened here without so. Now as I am returning to the greater empire, I would not regret it even if I died." As he travelled past cities laid desolate by his army, he lamented, "The fact that I did all this to China was the fault of the Prince of Yan [(i.e., Zhao Yanshou)]." He also commented that it was also the contributions of his official Zhang Li.

Emperor Taizong's departure from Daliang, however, only continued to embolden the Han rebels, and soon, the key Yellow River ford of Heyang (河陽, in modern Luoyang) fell. When he heard of Heyang's fall, he lamented:

I made three errors, such it was right that the realm is rebelling against me! First, I extracted the money from the circuits. Second, I let the soldiers from the greater empire thresh the grass seeds. Third, I did not let the military governors return to their circuits quicker.

Meanwhile, when Emperor Taizong's train arrived at Lincheng (臨城, in modern Xingtai, he began to become ill. By the time that he reached Luancheng (欒城, in modern Shijiazhuang), his illness became worse, and he was running such a high fever such that he had ice stacked on his chest, abdomen, and limbs, and was chewing the ice, to try to relieve the fever. Shortly after, he died. The Khitan generals cut open his abdomen and stuffed it with salt, to allow continued transport north. The Han sarcastically referred to him as "dried emperor." The Khitan chieftains supported his nephew (Yelü Bei's son) Yelü Ruan to succeed him as emperor (as Emperor Shizong), and Emperor Shizong was able to take over the throne after fighting off challenges, first leveled by Zhao Yanshou, and then leveled by Empress Dowager Shulü and Yelü Lihu. However, Liao was unable to retain the lands that Emperor Taizong seized from Later Jin, which eventually all became part of Liu Zhiyuan's Later Han state.

== Family ==
Consort and issue(s):

- Empress Jing'an, of the Xiao clan (靖安皇后 蕭氏, d. 18 February 953), personal name Wen (溫), Taizong's first cousin
  - Yelü Jing, Emperor Muzong (遼穆宗 耶律璟; 19 September 931 – 12 March 969), 1st son
  - Yelü Yansage, Imperial Uncle Qinjing (欽靖皇太叔 耶律罨撒葛, 935 – 969), 2nd son
- Palace lady, of the Xiao clan (宮人 蕭氏)
  - Yelü Tiande (耶律天德, d. 948), 3rd son
  - Yelü Dilie, Prince of Ji (冀王 耶律敵烈, d. 978), 4th son
  - Yelü Bishe, Prince of Yue (越王 耶律必攝, d. 973), 5th son
- Unknown
  - Princess of Yan (燕國公主), personal name Lübugu (呂不古), 1 st daughter
    - Married Xiao Siwen (蕭思溫) and had issue (3 daughters including Empress Ruizhi)
  - Yelü Chaogui (耶律嘲瑰), 2nd daughter

Emperor Taizong of Liao House of Yelü (915–1125) Born: 902 Died: 947
Regnal titles
Preceded by Emperor Taizu	Emperor of the Liao Dynasty; 927–947	Succeeded by Emperor Shizong
Preceded by Li Congke of Later Tang	Emperor of China (Beijing/Tianjin/Northern Hebei/Northern Shanxi); 937–947	Succeeded by Emperor Shizong
Preceded by Shi Chonggui of Later Jin	Emperor of China (Central); 947	Succeeded by Emperor Shizong
Preceded by Shi Chonggui of Later Jin	Emperor of China (Central Shanxi); 947	Succeeded by Liu Zhiyuan of Later Han
