= Emperor Muzong of Liao =

Emperor of the Liao dynasty from 951 to 969

Emperor Muzong of Liao 遼穆宗

Emperor of the Liao dynasty
- Reign: 11 October 951 – 12 March 969
- Predecessor: Emperor Shizong
- Successor: Emperor Jingzong
- Born: Yelü Jing; Shulü (infant name); 19 September 931
- Died: 12 March 969 (aged 37)
- Burial: Huailing Mausoleum (懷陵, alongside his father; in present-day Bairin Right Banner, Inner Mongolia)
- Spouse: Lady Xiao (蕭妃)
Era dates
- Yingli (應曆; 951–969)
Regnal name
- Emperor Tianshun (天順皇帝)
Posthumous name
- Emperor Xiao'an Jingzheng (孝安敬正皇帝)
Temple name
- Muzong (穆宗)
- House: Yelü
- Dynasty: Liao
- Father: Emperor Taizong
- Mother: Empress Xiao Wen

Emperor Muzong of Liao
- Traditional Chinese: 遼穆宗
- Simplified Chinese: 辽穆宗
Transcriptions
Standard Mandarin
- Hanyu Pinyin: Liáo Mùzōng

Yelü Jing
- Chinese: 耶律璟
Transcriptions
Standard Mandarin
- Hanyu Pinyin: Yēlǜ Jǐng

Shulü (infant name)
- Chinese: 述律
Transcriptions
Standard Mandarin
- Hanyu Pinyin: Shùlǜ

Emperor Muzong of Liao (19 September 931 – 12 March 969), personal name Yelü Jing, infant name Shulü, was the fourth emperor of the Khitan-led Liao dynasty of China. He was the eldest son of the second Liao emperor, Emperor Taizong. He succeeded his cousin, Emperor Shizong, after the latter was murdered in 951.

== Rebellions ==
Emperor Muzong's reign was plagued by plots and rebellions against him from both the imperial clan and the Xiao consort clan. He fired many ministers who worked for Emperor Shizong, and used force against those who dared to rebel against him. However, his brutal use of force and repression was eventually able to restore stability and the authority of the throne.

== Relations with other Chinese dynasties ==
The Later Zhou dynasty took advantage of Emperor Muzong's troubles to consolidate its position in northern China, a region that had been under the influence of the Khitans since earlier in the century. Despite this, the Northern Han dynasty, who remained under the protection of the Liao dynasty were able to maintain their independence.

The Later Zhou dynasty attacked Liao positions in 958 in an attempt to regain the Sixteen Prefectures. This provoked Emperor Muzong to lead a large army to the southern capital (present-day Beijing). Military confrontation was averted with the death of the Later Zhou emperor Chai Rong. Early the next year, Emperor Muzong returned to the capital.

Midway through Emperor Muzong's reign, the Northern Song dynasty had supplanted the last of the Five Dynasties, the Later Zhou dynasty. Relations between the Liao dynasty and Northern Song dynasty were peaceful during the reign of Emperor Muzong. Despite this peace, there were two issues outstanding between the two states that would result in war after Emperor Muzong's reign: those of the Sixteen Prefectures and the Northern Han dynasty. Neither of these issues would be resolved during the reign of Emperor Muzong. The two states began exchanging annual visits during the Chinese New Year. Profitable trade also continued to grow between the two sides.

== In popular culture ==
- Portrayed by Li Ning in the 2020 Chinese TV series The Legend of Xiao Chuo.

Emperor Muzong of Liao House of Yelü (916–1125) Born: 931 Died: 969
Regnal titles
Preceded by Emperor Shizong	Emperor of the Liao Dynasty; 951–969	Succeeded by Emperor Jingzong
