= Ma Yinsun =

Ma Yinsun (Chinese: 馬胤孫) (died 953), courtesy name Qingxian (慶先), was an official of the Chinese Five Dynasties and Ten Kingdoms Period Later Tang state, serving briefly as a chancellor during the reign of its last emperor Li Congke. (Some traditional sources written during the subsequent Song dynasty referred to him as "Ma Yisun" (馬裔孫) to observe naming taboo for Song's founding emperor Zhao Kuangyin (Emperor Taizu).)

== Background ==
It is not known when Ma Yinsun was born, and all that is known about his family background was that he was from Shanghe (商河, in modern Jinan, Shandong). It was said that he had a weak personality. He was studious in his youth, and he particularly took after Han Yu in his writing style. At some point (although it is not known when), he passed the imperial examinations in the Jinshi class.

== Service under Li Congke ==
=== Before Li Congke's reign ===
During the reign of the Later Tang emperor Li Siyuan, Li Siyuan's adoptive son Li Congke served as the military governor (Jiedushi) of Huguo Circuit (護國, headquartered in modern Yuncheng, Shanxi). Ma Yinsun became Li Congke's assistant in Li Congke's role as governor (觀察使, Guanchashi). When Li Congke lost his governorship of Huguo due to the machinations of Li Siyuan's chief of staff An Chonghui in 930 and was forced to take up residence at the capital Luoyang with no real authorities, instead of leaving Li Congke, Ma followed Li Congke to Luoyang and continued to serve him. Later (after An's fall from grace and Li Congke's restoration to grace), Ma continued to follow Li Congke to his posts as the mayor of Jingzhao Municipality (京兆, in modern Xi'an, Shaanxi) and then as the military governor of Fengxiang Circuit (鳳翔, headquartered in modern Baoji, Shaanxi).

As of 934, Li Congke's adoptive brother (Li Siyuan's biological son) Li Conghou was emperor. Dominating his court were his chiefs of staff, Zhu Hongzhao and Feng Yun, who suspected both Li Congke and his brother-in-law (Li Siyuan's son-in-law) Shi Jingtang the military governor of Hedong Circuit (河東, headquartered in modern Taiyuan, Shanxi). They decided to dislodge both Li Congke and Shi by issuing a number of orders, transferring Li Congke from Fengxiang to Hedong, Shi from Hedong to Chengde Circuit (成德, headquartered in modern Shijiazhuang, Hebei), and Chengde's military governor Fan Yanguang to Tianxiong Circuit (天雄, headquartered in modern Handan, Hebei). Li Congke feared that this was a deathtrap, and he consulted his staff members, most of whom suggested that he rebel. When he consulted Ma, Ma advised heading to Luoyang to pay homage to Li Conghou and then report to Hedong — a suggestion that the other staff members were openly contemptuous to. Li Congke ultimately decided to rebel, but respected Ma for his faithfulness. Li Congke's army soon defeated the army Li Conghou sent against him, and marched on Luoyang, but was killed in flight. Li Congke became emperor.

=== During Li Congke's reign ===
Li Congke, once he took the throne, commissioned Ma Yinsun as imperial scholar (翰林學士, Hanlin Xueshi) as well as Hubu Langzhong (戶部郎中), a supervisory official at the ministry of census (戶部, Hubu), and put him in charge of drafting edicts. Within the span of a year, he continued to promote Ma — first to Zhongshu Sheren (中書舍人), a mid-level official at the legislative bureau of government (中書省, Zhongshu Sheng); then to deputy minister of rites (禮部侍郎, Libu Shilang); Ma also continued to serve as imperial scholar.

In spring 936, Li Congke commissioned Ma as the Zhongshu Shilang (中書侍郎, deputy head of the legislative bureau) and chancellor, with the designation Tong Zhongshu Menxia Pingzhangshi (同中書門下平章事). However, it was said that because Ma was overly careful, he did not handle many of the responsibilities of chancellorship, and also was not seeing guests. Therefore, people referred to him as, "the one who does not open three things" (三不開) — i.e., he did not open his mouth (to talk), did not open his seal (to handle official business), and did not open his gate (to welcome people in).

Shortly after Ma became chancellor, Shi Jingtang, then still at Hedong, rebelled. The forces that Li Congke sent against him, commanded by Zhang Jingda, was defeated by the joint army of Shi and Emperor Taizong of Later Tang's northern rival Khitan Empire, and soon became surrounded by Khitan/Hedong troops at Jin'an Base (晉安寨, near Hedong's capital Taiyuan). A second major general that Li Congke sent, Zhao Dejun, was not fully devoted to Li Congke's cause, and stopped well short of Taiyuan, while secretly negotiating with Emperor Taizong, hoping that Emperor Taizong would support him rather than Shi as Li Congke's replacement instead. Li Congke's own army stopped at Huai Prefecture (懷州, in modern Jiaozuo, Henan), as Li Congke became paralyzed by fear. At that time, Ma, whom Li Congke had left at Luoyang, arrived at Huai as well. The other chancellors, anticipating that Ma would have good suggestions, stated, "Chancellor Ma has arrived. He must have suggestions on how to secure the state." Instead, all Ma did was offer silk to Li Congke, and had nothing else in terms of suggestions.

Soon thereafter, Zhang's deputy Yang Guangyuan assassinated him and surrendered the army at Jin'an to the joint Khitan/Hedong army. Emperor Taizong declared Shi the emperor of a new Later Jin, and Shi advanced south toward Luoyang. Zhao's army collapsed, and he was forced to surrender. Li Congke, finding the situation hopeless, returned to Luoyang and committed suicide with his family, ending Later Tang. Shi entered Luoyang shortly after and took over Later Tang's territory.

== After Later Tang ==
In an edict that Shi Jingtang issued after entering Luoyang that declared a general pardon, he, excepting them from the general pardon, ordered the deaths of Li Congke's close associates Zhang Yanlang, Liu Yanhao, and Liu Yanlang (劉延朗). He singled out several officials whom he stated as not complicit with Li Congke (his justification for rebelling against Li Congke was that Li Congke, as an adoptive son, was an usurper of the Later Tang throne) — Ma Yinsun, Fang Gao, Li Zhuanmei (李專美), and Han Zhaoyin — such that they were removed from their posts but spared their lives.

In 939, Shi, apparently viewed his punishment of Ma, Fang, Han, and Li Zhuanmei to be too harsh (as he pitied them for being in poverty), commissioned them various offices — in Ma's case, Taizi Binke (太子賓客) — but then immediately ordered them into retirement (i.e., to allow them to draw pensions without allowing them to return to the government).

In retirement, Ma made a complete turn in his spiritual beliefs. Previously, he had been a critic of Buddhism, taking after Han Yu, whose writing style he followed. Now, in retirement, he lamented Li Congke's fate bitterly, as he was still thankful for Li Congke's grace toward him. He began to study Buddhist sutras, hoping to gain divine favor and have the favor transferred to Li Congke's soul. He was particularly fascinated with the Avatamsaka Sutra and the Śūraṅgama Sūtra. He took to copy those sutras personally, and he wrote poems summarizing their theology, which he collected in a work titled the Faxi Collection (法喜集), and further wrote a prose excerpt of key points from those sutras as well, titled the Fuguo Collection (佛國集). When someone mockingly asked him, "You, Lord, throughout your life, had viewed Fu Yi [(a Sui dynasty anti-Buddhist writer)] and Han Yu to have the better view. How is it that your arrogance has turned to abjectness? Is it that Buddha is flattering you? Or is it that you are flattering Buddha?" Ma smiled and responded, "It would be too much for me to say that Buddha is flattering me."

Throughout Later Jin and the succeeding Later Han, it was said that because the officials knew that Ma liked to write, they often requested him to write for them. Ma also favored calligraphy, and whenever he was he wrote greetings to others, he would write it himself to show up his calligraphic abilities. After Guo Wei founded Later Zhou, he gave Ma, in addition to the title of Taizi Binke, also the title of acting minister of rites (禮部尚書, Libu Shangshu), but with his office at Luoyang rather than then-capital Kaifeng — in other words, keeping him in de facto retirement. He died in 953, during Guo's reign.

== Notes and references ==
- Old History of the Five Dynasties, vol. 127.
- New History of the Five Dynasties, vol. 55.
- Zizhi Tongjian, vols. 279, 280, 282.
