= 937 =

Calendar year

937 in various calendars
- Gregorian calendar: 937; CMXXXVII
- Ab urbe condita: 1690
- Armenian calendar: 386; ԹՎ ՅՁԶ
- Assyrian calendar: 5687
- Balinese saka calendar: 858–859
- Bengali calendar: 343–344
- Berber calendar: 1887
- Buddhist calendar: 1481
- Burmese calendar: 299
- Byzantine calendar: 6445–6446
- Chinese calendar: 丙申年 (Fire Monkey); 3634 or 3427 — to — 丁酉年 (Fire Rooster); 3635 or 3428
- Coptic calendar: 653–654
- Discordian calendar: 2103
- Ethiopian calendar: 929–930
- Hebrew calendar: 4697–4698
- Hindu calendars
- Vikram Samvat: 993–994
- Shaka Samvat: 858–859
- Kali Yuga: 4037–4038
- Holocene calendar: 10937
- Iranian calendar: 315–316
- Islamic calendar: 325–326
- Japanese calendar: Jōhei 7 (承平７年)
- Javanese calendar: 837–838
- Julian calendar: 937; CMXXXVII
- Korean calendar: 3270
- Minguo calendar: 975 before ROC 民前975年
- Nanakshahi calendar: −531
- Seleucid era: 1248/1249 AG
- Thai solar calendar: 1479–1480
- Tibetan calendar: མེ་ཕོ་སྤྲེ་ལོ་ (male Fire-Monkey); 1063 or 682 or −90 — to — མེ་མོ་བྱ་ལོ་ (female Fire-Bird); 1064 or 683 or −89

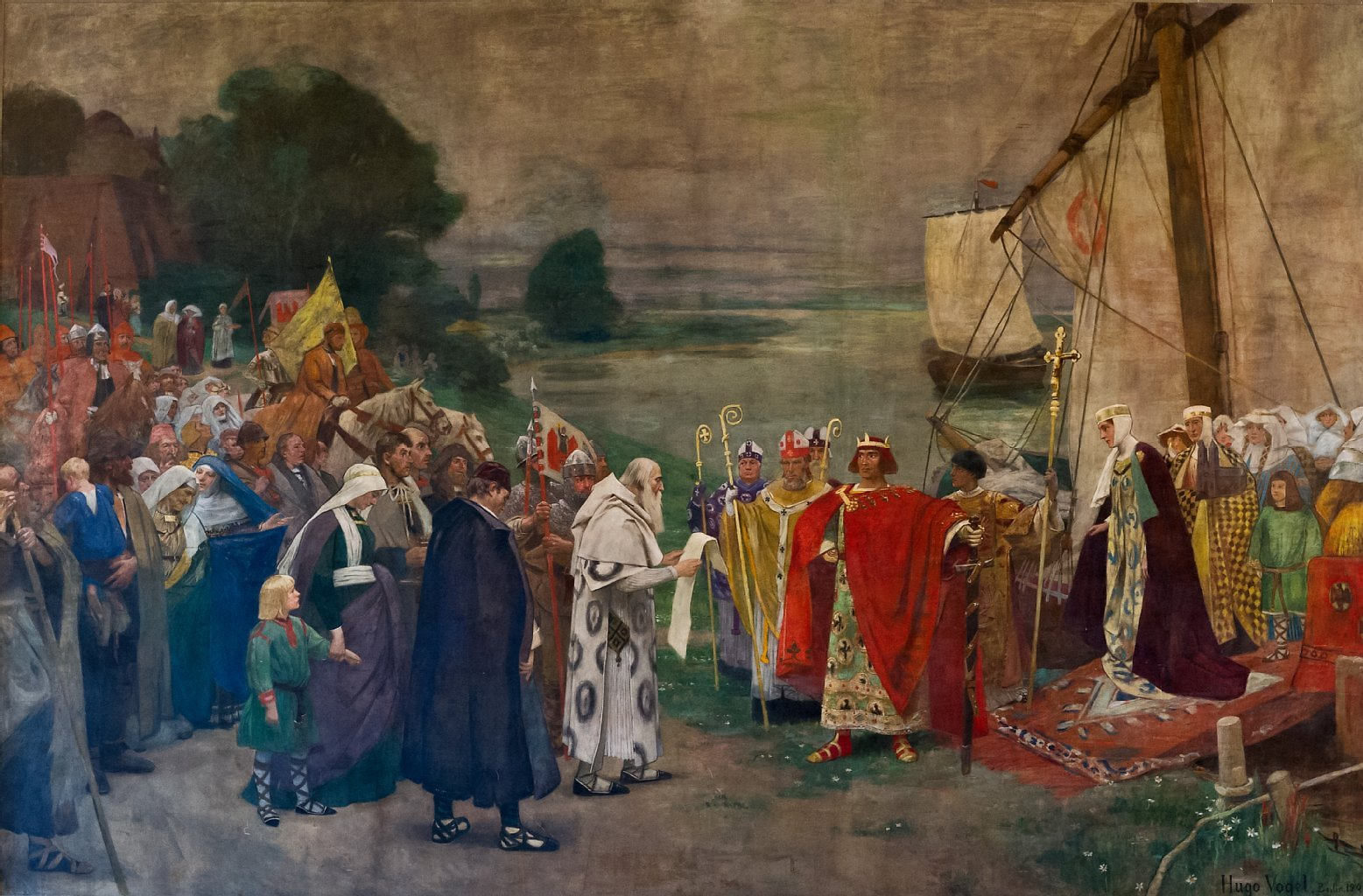
Otto I, Holy Roman Emperor and his wife Eadgyth arrive near Magdeburg, AD 937 (painted by Hugo Vogel 1898)

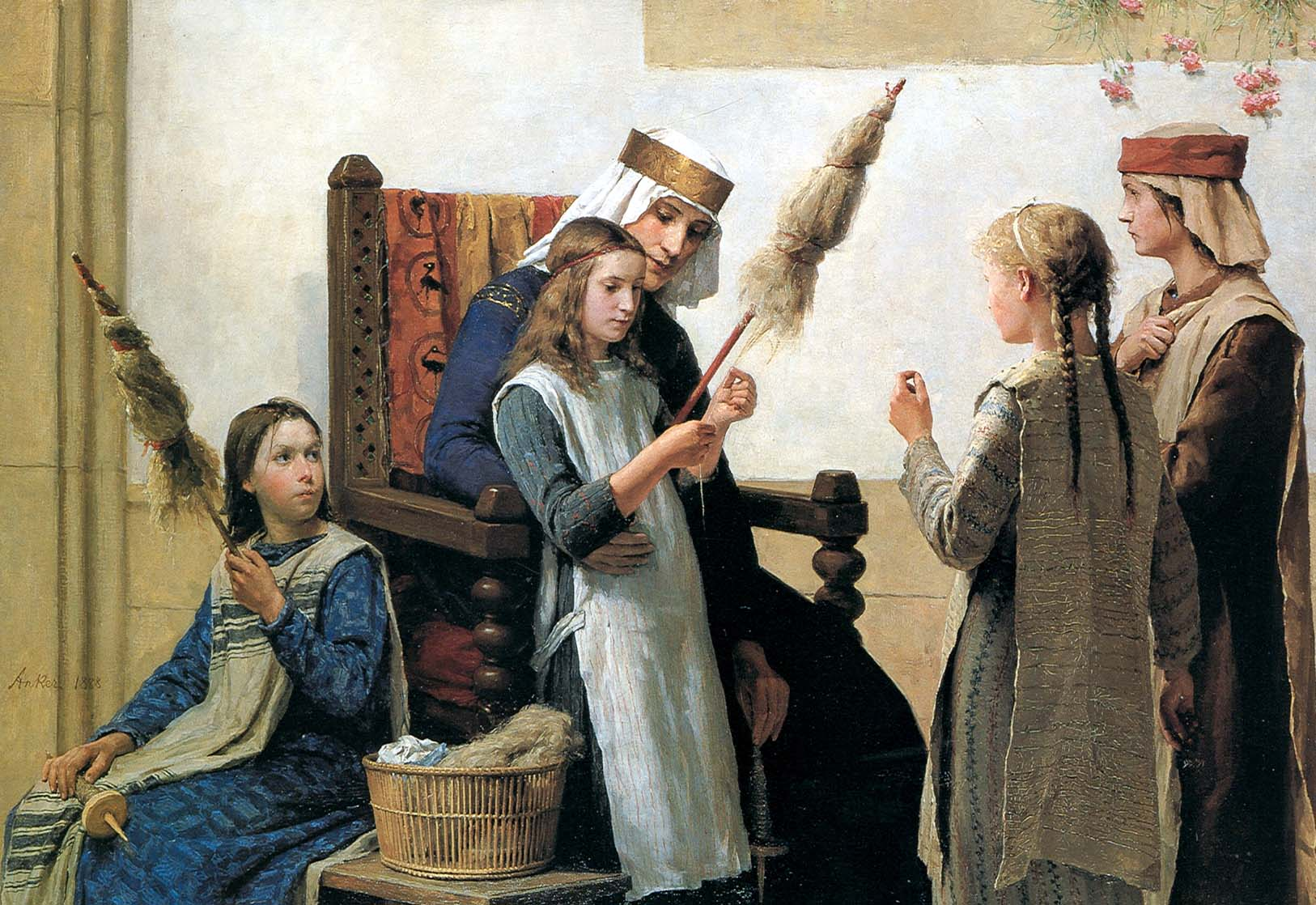
Queen Bertha and the Spinners (1888).

Year 937 (CMXXXVII) was a common year starting on Sunday of the Julian calendar.

== Events ==
=== By place ===
==== Europe ====
- A Hungarian army invades Burgundy, and burns the city of Tournus. Then they go southwards to Italy, pillaging the environs of Naples, Benevento and Monte Cassino. When the Hungarians return home, they are attacked in the Apennine Mountains by Lombard forces, losing their plunder (approximate date).
- July 11 – King Rudolph II of Burgundy dies after a 25-year reign, and is succeeded by his 12-year-old son Conrad I ("the Peaceful"). His wife, Queen Bertha, takes effective control of unified Burgundy, transferring its capital to Arles (that Burgundian kingdom was later known from the 12th century as the Kingdom of Arles).
- King Otto I refuses to give land to his older (illegitimate) half-brother Thankmar, who gains the support of Eberhard III (duke of Franconia) and Wichmann the Elder, and seizes the fortress of Eresburg. Otto assumes direct rule over Franconia, and dissolves it into smaller counties.
- King Hugh of Arles (king of Italy) travels to Colombier (Switzerland) and marries Rudolph's widow Bertha. He takes Conrad I under his tutelage and betroths Rudolph's 6-year-old daughter Adelaide with his own son and co-ruler Lothair II.
- Winter – Gero succeeds his brother Siegfried after his death. King Otto I appoints him as count and margrave of a vast border region around Merseburg that abuts the Wends on the River Saale (Lower Saxony).
- Magdeburg becomes the capital of the East Frankish Kingdom, after a Diet held by King Otto I (approximate date).

==== England ====
- Battle of Brunanburh: King Æthelstan defeats a combined Northern Army under the kings Olaf of Dublin, Constantine II of Scotland and Owain of Strathclyde. Though none of the British monarchs appear to have taken part, the people of Strathclyde were a major contingent under their Scottish king.

==== Asia ====
- November 10 – Li Bian usurps the throne and deposes Emperor Yang Pu. The Wu State is replaced and Li (called "Xu Zhigao") becomes the first emperor of Southern Tang, one of the Ten Kingdoms in southern China.
- Winter – The Later Tang falls to the Later Jin (during the Five Dynasties and Ten Kingdoms period) founded by Emperor Shi Jingtang (posthumously known as "Gaozu of Jin").

== Births ==
- Attilanus, bishop of Zamora (d. 1007)
- Bagrat II, king of Iberia and Kartli (d. 994)
- Gu Hongzhong, Chinese painter (d. 975)
- Haakon Sigurdsson, Viking ruler (d. 995)
- Khalaf ibn Ahmad, Saffarid emir (d. 1009)
- Li Yu, ruler of Southern Tang (approximate date)
- Meng Xuanzhe, prince of Later Shu (d. 991)
- William IV, duke of Aquitaine (d. 994)

== Deaths ==
- January 11
  - Cao, empress of Later Tang
  - Li Chongmei, prince of Later Tang
  - Li Congke, emperor of Later Tang (b. 885)
  - Liu, empress of Later Tang
- January 14 – Zhang Yanlang, Chinese official
- July 11 – Rudolph II, king of Burgundy
- July 14 – Arnulf I, duke of Bavaria
- October 10 – Wang Lingmou, chancellor of Wu
- December 3 – Siegfried, Frankish nobleman
- Ælfwine, bishop of Lichfield (approximate date)
- Abbo, adviser and bishop of Soissons
- Alphege, bishop of Wells (approximate date)
- David II, king of Iberia/Kartli (Georgia)
- David ibn Merwan, Jewish philosopher
- Dubacan of Angus, Scottish nobleman
- Ermengol, Frankish nobleman (b. 870)
- Gebeachan, king of the Isles (Hebrides)
- Liu Yanhao, general of Later Tang
- Marozia, Roman noblewoman (b. 890)
- Tidhelm, bishop of Hereford (approximate date)
- Xu Jingqian, official and regent of Wu (b. 919)
- Yang Meng, prince of Wu (Ten Kingdoms)
- Yelü Bei, prince of the Liao Dynasty (b. 899)
- Zhao Dejun, general of Later Tang
