= Han Zhaoyin =

Han Zhaoyin (韓昭胤) was an official of the Chinese Five Dynasties and Ten Kingdoms Period states Later Tang and Later Jin, serving as the chief of staff (Shumishi) for Later Tang's last emperor Li Congke.

== During Later Tang ==
Despite the high position Han Zhaoyin eventually achieved, virtually nothing is known about his personal background, as there was no biography of his in either the Old History of the Five Dynasties or the New History of the Five Dynasties. The first historical reference to him was in 934, as of which time he was serving as Li Congke's secretary in Li Congke's role as military governor (Jiedushi) of Fengxiang Circuit (鳳翔, headquartered in modern Baoji, Shaanxi). In spring of that year, Li Congke overthrew his adoptive brother Li Conghou, who was then emperor, and took the throne as emperor. After doing so, he commissioned Han as an imperial scholar at Duanming Hall (端明殿), and also gave him the title of Zuo Jianyi Daifu (左諫議大夫, a high-level consultant at the examination bureau of government (門下省, Menxia Sheng)).

In summer of that year, Li Congke made Han his chief of staff (Shumishi). At that time, an important decision for Li Congke to make was what to do with his brother-in-law Shi Jingtang (the husband of his adoptive sister the Princess of Wei), who was then the military governor of Hedong Circuit (河東, headquartered in modern Taiyuan, Shanxi) but who at that time was at the capital Luoyang. (Li Congke and Shi had long not liked each other even when they both served as officers under Li Congke's adoptive father Li Siyuan, and Shi had initially postured supporting Li Conghou in the civil war between Li Congke and Li Conghou, before submitting to Li Congke and being forced to go to Luoyang to confirm that submission.) Most of Li Congke's followers from Fengxiang advocated detaining Shi at Luoyang and not return him to Hedong. However, Li Siyuan's wife Empress Dowager Cao and the Princess of Wei were both begging on Shi's behalf. Han and another advisor, Li Zhuanmei (李專美), believed that detaining Shi would cause apprehension for another brother-in-law of Li Congke's, Zhao Yanshou the military governor of Xuanwu Circuit (宣武, headquartered in modern Kaifeng, Henan), and Zhao's adoptive father Zhao Dejun the military governor of Lulong Circuit (盧龍, headquartered in modern Beijing). Li Congke ultimately decided to allow Shi to return to Hedong.

Shortly after, Li Congke considered executing the officer Chu Kuangzuo (楚匡祚), who had, under Li Conghou's orders, executed Li Congke's son Li Chongji (李重吉) during the civil war. Han pointed out that Chu was merely following orders and that executing him would alienate others who had followed Li Conghou's orders. Li Congke agreed, and only exiled Chu.

At that time, the chancellor Liu Xu, who was in charge of the three financial agencies (taxation, treasury, and salt and iron monopolies), was conducting a major audit of the three agencies' accounts. He discovered that much of the purported treasury reserves were in fact uncollectible debts that the administrators kept on the books to use as excuses to harshly collect from the people. Liu reported this to Li Congke and advocated a two-pronged approach — that the government make all efforts to collect the collectible debts but forgive the uncollectible ones. Han agreed with Liu and advocated adoption of Liu's proposal. Li Congke issued an edict forgiving much of the debts that were accumulated from before Li Siyuan's Changxing era (930–933). This drew praise from the people but resentment from the administrators at the three agencies.

In summer 935, Han, who was then also carrying the title of minister of justice (刑部尚書, Xingbu Shangshu) in addition to chief of staff, was given the title of Zhongshu Shilang (中書侍郎, deputy head of the legislative bureau (中書省, Zhongshu Sheng)), and given the chancellor designation Tong Zhongshu Menxia Pingzhangshi (同中書門下平章事).

Around the new year 936, Han was sent out of Luoyang to serve as the military governor of Huguo Circuit (護國, headquartered in modern Yuncheng, Shanxi), still carrying the Tong Zhongshu Menxia Pingzhangshi title as an honorary title.

== During Later Jin ==
In 936, Shi Jingtang, with support from Later Tang's northern rival Khitan Empire, rebelled against Li Congke and declared his own state of Later Jin. After the Later Tang forces he sent against Shi were defeated by the Khitan/Later Jin forces, Li Congke committed suicide with his family, ending Later Tang and allowing Later Jin to take over its territory. In an edict that Shi issued after entering Luoyang that declared a general pardon, he, excepting them from the general pardon, ordered the deaths of Li Congke's close associates Zhang Yanlang, Liu Yanhao, and Liu Yanlang (劉延朗). He singled out several officials whom he stated as not complicit with Li Congke (his justification for rebelling against Li Congke was that Li Congke, as an adoptive son, was an usurper of the Later Tang throne) — Ma Yinsun, Fang Gao, Li Zhuanmei, and Han Zhaoyin — such that they were removed from their posts but spared their lives.

In 939, Shi, apparently viewed his punishment of Ma, Fang, Han, and Li Zhuanmei to be too harsh (as he pitied them for being in poverty), commissioned them various offices — in Han's case, minister of defense (兵部尚書, Bingbu Shangshu) — but then immediately ordered them into retirement (i.e., to allow them to draw pensions without allowing them to return to the government). That was the last historical reference to Han, and it is not known when he died.
