= Li Chongmei =

Chinese general and prince

Li Chongmei (Chinese: 李重美) (died January 11, 937), formally the Prince of Yong (雍王), was an imperial prince of the Chinese Five Dynasties and Ten Kingdoms Period state Later Tang, as a son of its last emperor Li Congke.

== Background ==
It is not known when Li Chongmei was born — although he was both described by historians as "young, but as intelligent and agile as an adult" and self-described as a "child" even as of his death year, suggesting that he was not yet of adult age at that point. It is not known who his mother was, including whether she was Li Congke's wife Lady Liu (later empress) or not. He was Li Congke's second son. He married a daughter of general Fan Yanguang.

== During Li Congke's reign ==
In 934, Li Chongmei's father Li Congke overthrew his adoptive brother (Li Chongmei's uncle) Li Conghou, who was then emperor, and took the throne himself. As Li Chongmei's older brother Li Chongji (李重吉) and sister Li Huiming (李惠明) were executed by Li Conghou during Li Congke's rebellion, Li Chongmei was effectively Li Congke's only son (or oldest — although historical records did not suggest that Li Congke had any younger sons). Apparently shortly after Li Congke took the throne, he gave Li Chongmei the title of imperial guard general, and shortly after gave him the titles of military governor (Jiedushi) of Chengde Circuit (成德, headquartered in modern Shijiazhuang, Hebei), honorary chancellor designation of Tong Zhongshu Menxia Pingzhangshi (同中書門下平章事), mayor of Henan Municipality (河南, i.e., the region of the capital Luoyang), and commander of the imperial guards. His military governorship was later moved from Chengde to Tianxiong Circuit (天雄, headquartered in modern Handan, Hebei). (He did not appear to have reported to either circuit, and Tianxiong was later given to Empress Liu's brother, Liu Yanhao.)

In spring 936, Li Congke created Li Chongmei the Prince of Yong.

Not long after, Li Chongmei's uncle (the husband of his aunt the Princess of Jin), Shi Jingtang the military governor of Hedong Circuit (河東, headquartered in modern Taiyuan, Shanxi), rebelled with aid from the Khitan Empire. When the main Later Tang forces Li Congke sent to attack Shi, commanded by Zhang Jingda, was defeated and surrounded by the combined Khitan/Hedong forces, Li Congke's high-level officials were all pushing for him to personally lead the imperial army against Shi. Li Chongmei volunteered to go in his stead, stating:

Your Imperial Majesty's eye ailment is not cured, and should not be exposed to distant travels with wind and sand. Although your subject is but a child, I am willing to head north myself instead of Your Imperial Majesty.

Li Congke, who was hesitant to face Shi, initially was inclined to grant Li Chongmei's request, but the chancellor Zhang Yanlang, Liu Yanhao, and the director of palace affairs Liu Yanlang (劉延朗) were all urging Li Congke himself to go, and therefore he launched his army, but he advanced slowly, fearful of Shi. He left Li Chongmei in charge of Luoyang.

As continued news of Later Tang defeats were arriving at Luoyang (including the assassination of Zhang Jingda by his deputy Yang Guangyuan and Yang's subsequent surrender to Khitan/Hedong forces, as well as the defeat of another Later Tang army, commanded by Zhao Dejun), the people in the city were panicking and trying to leave the city and hide in mountains and valleys nearby. The guards at the city gates were initially inclined to stop them. Li Chongmei, however, stated:

The state is suffering disasters and unable to protect the people. If we stop them from saving themselves, we will only be hurting our reputation. It is better to let them go. If things calm down, they will return.

He thus opened the gates and allowed the people to leave, which actually served to calm the people's hearts.

Shortly after, Li Congke returned to Luoyang, trying to mount a defense there, but with Shi approaching Luoyang and his generals submitting to Shi in droves, Li Congke gathered his family members and a number of officers still loyal to him and prepared to commit suicide by fire at Xuanwu Tower (玄武樓). Empress Liu, however, also planned to burn down the entire palace complex. Li Chongmei persuaded her not to, stating to her, "The new Son of Heaven surely cannot sleep under open air. He would only, at a future time, expend the energy of the people to rebuild. How is it that we should die and leave the people to hate us?" Shortly after, Li Congke's family, including Empress Liu and Li Chongmei, committed suicide by fire.

== Notes and references ==
- Old History of the Five Dynasties, vol. 51.
- New History of the Five Dynasties, vol. 16.
- Zizhi Tongjian, vols. 279, 280.
