= Fang Gao =

Chinese general and politician (d. 944)

Fang Gao (房暠) (died 944) was an official of the Chinese Five Dynasties and Ten Kingdoms period Later Tang and Later Jin states, serving as the chief of staff (Shumishi) for Later Tang's last emperor Li Congke.

== Background ==
It is not known when Fang Gao was born, but it is known that he was from the Tang dynasty capital Chang'an. In his youth, he served on staff at the mansion of the Tang chancellor Cui Yin. According to the Old History of the Five Dynasties, he later took up residence at Hezhong Municipality (河中, in modern Yuncheng, Shanxi) due to a disturbance. (This might be referring to Cui's death at the hands of the major warlord Zhu Quanzhong the military governor of Xuanwu Circuit (宣武, headquartered in modern Kaifeng, Henan), in 904.)

== During Later Tang ==
In 926, by which time Tang had long fallen, and the emperor of central China was the Later Tang emperor Li Siyuan, Li Siyuan commissioned his adoptive son Li Congke as the acting military governor of Huguo Circuit (護國, headquartered at Hezhong). Either at that time or shortly after, when Li Congke went to Hezhong to take over the circuit command, Fang Gao went to greet him on the road, and requested to serve on his staff. Li Congke was pleased with him and made him in charge of the guests in Li Congke's household.

In 934, Li Congke overthrew then-emperor, his adoptive brother (Li Siyuan's biological son) Li Conghou and became emperor. Apparently shortly after, Fang was made the acting secretary at the office of the chief of staff (樞密院, Shumi Yuan), and thereafter a director of palace affairs (宣徽使, Xuanhuishi). In fall 935, Fang was made one of the chiefs of staff, serving with Li Congke's brother-in-law Zhao Yanshou. However, Li Congke's close associate Liu Yanlang (劉延朗) served as deputy chief of staff, and it was said that Li Congke listened to Liu, as well as a scholar at the office of chief of staff, Xue Wenyu (薛文遇), far more than he did Zhao or Fang. Fang himself made few decisive suggestions, often acting ambiguously when presented proposals. Indeed, when intelligence reports and requests came from the two key commands on the border between Later Tang and its northern rival Khitan Empire—Lulong Circuit (盧龍, headquartered in modern Beijing), then commanded by Zhao's adoptive father Zhao Dejun, and Hedong Circuit (河東, headquartered in modern Taiyuan, Shanxi), then commanded by another brother-in-law of Li Congke's, Shi Jingtang, Fang would often fall asleep at the chief of staff meetings. As a result, the matters ended up being ruled on by Liu. It was said that Liu used the opportunity to extract bribes from military governors and prefects, giving them prize assignments for greater bribes, causing much resentment from the generals toward Li Congke, who was unaware of the situation. However, Fang (along with imperial scholars Li Song and Lü Qi (呂琦) did do what they could to dissuade Li Congke from an idea that he had that they believed would be disastrous—moving Shi from Hedong to Tianping Circuit (天平, headquartered in modern Tai'an, Shandong)—believing that Shi would rebel if he did so.

In summer 936, by which time Lü was no longer imperial scholar, there was a night when Li Song had the night off, and Xue was on duty, attending to Li Congke. Xue took the opportunity to persuade Li Congke that Shi would rebel anyway, and that it was better to let him rebel now. Li Congke agreed, and therefore issued an edict moving Shi from Hedong to Tianping. Shi did in fact rebel, and thereafter, with aid from the Khitan, defeated Later Tang forces Li Congke sent against him and then approached the capital Luoyang. Li Congke and his family committed suicide, ending Later Tang.

== During Later Jin ==
Shi Jingtang, whom Khitan's Emperor Taizong had declared to be emperor of a new state of Later Jin, entered Luoyang and took over Later Tang's territory. In an edict that Shi issued after entering Luoyang that declared a general pardon, he, excepting them from the general pardon, ordered the deaths of Li Congke's close associates Zhang Yanlang, Liu Yanhao, and Liu Yanlang. He singled out several officials whom he stated as not complicit with Li Congke (his justification for rebelling against Li Congke was that Li Congke, as an adoptive son, was an usurper of the Later Tang throne)—Ma Yinsun, Fang Gao, Li Zhuanmei (李專美), and Han Zhaoyin—such that they were removed from their posts but spared their lives.

In 939, Shi, apparently viewed his punishment of Ma, Fang, Han, and Li Zhuanmei to be too harsh (as he pitied them for being in poverty), commissioned them various offices—in Fang's case, a general of the imperial guards—but then immediately ordered them into retirement (i.e., to allow them to draw pensions without allowing them to return to the government). Fang would die in 944, during the reign of Shi's nephew and successor Shi Chonggui, at Luoyang.

== Notes and references ==
- Old History of the Five Dynasties, vol. 96.
- Zizhi Tongjian, vols. 279, 280, 282.
