= Gao Xingzhou =

Chinese military general, monarch and politician

Gao Xingzhou (高行周) (885 – September 10, 952), courtesy name Shangzhi (尚質), formally Prince Wuyi of Qin (秦武懿王), was a Chinese military general, monarch, and politician who served the Five Dynasties and Ten Kingdoms period Jin, Later Tang, Later Jin, Liao Dynasty, Later Han, and Later Zhou. dynasties. His son Gao Huaide was later a famed general in the succeeding Song Dynasty.

== Background ==
Gao Xingzhou was born in 885, during the reign of Emperor Xizong of Tang. His family was originally from You Prefecture (幽州, in modern Beijing), but his male-line ancestors had served for several generations (since his great-grandfather Gao Shunli (高順厲)) at Huairong Base (懷戎) at Gui Prefecture (媯州, in modern Zhangjiakou, Hebei), which belonged to Lulong Circuit (盧龍, headquartered at You Prefecture), and Gao Xingzhou was born at the fortress at Huairong. Gao Xingzhou's father Gao Siji (高思繼) and Gao Siji's two brothers (one older, one younger, whose names are lost to history) were all known in the region for being brave and capable in military matters. In 895, when the major warlord Li Keyong the military governor (Jiedushi) of Hedong Circuit (河東, headquartered in modern Taiyuan) was preparing to conquer Lulong, Li Keyong claimed to be avenging the prior military governor of Lulong, Li Kuangwei, as then-military governor of Lulong, Li Kuangchou, was a younger brother of Li Kuangwei's but had seized Li Kuangwei's circuit in a coup. The Gao brothers, believing in Li Keyong's assertions, joined the Hedong army and participated in the successful Hedong operations to conquer Lulong.

After the Hedong army conquered Lulong, Li Keyong left the former Lulong officer Liu Rengong in command of Lulong, while leaving a Hedong army at Lulong to assist and guard Lulong. Liu made the Gao brothers the commanders of the forward, the middle, and the rear armies of Lulong, respectively, but either he himself (per the History of the Five Dynasties) or Li Keyong (per the New History of the Five Dynasties) was deeply suspicious of the Gao brothers, believing that they would eventually try to take over the circuit. Meanwhile, the Gao brothers imposed strict discipline on both the Lulong army and the Hedong soldiers that Li Keyong left at Lulong, and many were executed for violating laws. Li Keyong was displeased at the killing of the Hedong soldiers and complained to Liu. Liu blamed this on the Gao brothers, killing them. Wanting to appease the people of the circuit, however, as the Gao brothers were popular with the people, Liu made the Gao brothers' sons officers, and at the time, the more prominent one was Gao Xingzhou's cousin Gao Xinggui (高行珪), the son of Gao Siji's older brother. Gao Xingzhou was still young at the time, but was also made an officer. (Liu would eventually turn against Li Keyong, turning his Lulong Circuit into a domain independent of Li Keyong's.)

In 913, by which time Tang had fallen, and neither Li Keyong nor Liu Rengong was ruling his domain (by this time known respectively as the states of Jin and Yan) any more (Li Keyong had died in 908 and been succeeded by his son Li Cunxu as the Prince of Jin, while Liu Rengong had been overthrown by his son Liu Shouguang and put under arrest, with Liu Shouguang subsequently claiming the title of Emperor of Yan) the Jin army was launching a major attack on Yan. Gao Xinggui was then the prefect of Wu Prefecture (武州, in modern Zhangjiakou), and, unable to stand the attack of the Jin general (Li Cunxu's adoptive brother) Li Siyuan, surrendered Wu to Li Siyuan. When the major Yan general Yuan Xingqin heard this, he attacked Wu Prefecture. Gao Xinggui then sent Gao Xingzhou as a hostage to Li Siyuan and sought emergency aid. Li Siyuan, with Gao Xingzhou serving as his guide, was subsequently able to defeat Yuan, forcing Yuan's surrender. Subsequently, both Yuan and Gao Xingzhou remained as officers under Li Siyuan, with Gao and Li Siyuan's adoptive son Li Congke often serving as commanders of Li Siyuan's personal guards.

In 915, Li Cunxu was trying to build an elite guard corps serving under himself, and he requisitioned Yuan to serve as an officer of the corps. Li Siyuan felt compelled to allow Yuan to do so, and Li Cunxu subsequently gave Yuan the royal surname of Li, with a new name of Shaorong. Subsequently, there was a battle where Li Shaorong was surrounded by enemy soldiers (presumably soldiers of Jin's archrival Later Liang), when Gao Xingzhou fought into the encirclement and rescued Li Shaorong. Impressed, Li Cunxu also wanted Gao to serve under him, but did not feel that he could make another request to Li Siyuan. Instead, he secretly sent messengers to Gao, trying to entice him with higher offices. Gao declined, stating:

The prefect (i.e., Li Siyuan, who was then the prefect of Dai Prefecture (代州, in modern Xinzhou, Taiyuan)) is fostering good soldiers on behalf of Your Royal Highness. For me, Gao Xingzhou, to serve the prefect, is the same as directly serving Your Royal Highness. The prefect had saved me and my cousins from death, and I do not have the heart to leave him.

== Service during Later Tang ==
In spring 923, Li Cunxu declared himself the emperor of a new Later Tang (as Emperor Zhuangzong). At that time, the Later Tang and Later Liang forces were stalemated on the Yellow River. Li Siyuan suggested a surprise attack on Later Liang's Tianping Circuit (天平, headquartered in modern Tai'an, Shandong), south of the Yellow River. Emperor Zhuangzong agreed, and in the subsequent surprise attack on Tianping's capital Yun Prefecture (鄆州), Gao Xingzhou served under Li Siyuan in capturing the city. (During the surprise attack on Yun, Li Siyuan's army was initially hindered by pouring rain, but Gao pointed out that this would make the defenders of Yun even less cautious about a potential attack, and encouraged the rest of the army to continue on.) Emperor Zhuangzong was thus able to use Yun as the base for another surprise operation later in 923, capturing Later Liang's capital Daliang and destroying Later Liang. After destroying Later Liang, Emperor Zhuangzong made Gao the prefect of Duan Prefecture (端州, in modern Zhaoqing, Guangdong) (i.e., an honorary position, as Duan was then the territory of Southern Han), and later the prefect of Jiang Prefecture (絳州, in modern Yuncheng, Shanxi).

Gao was still serving under Li Siyuan in 926, when the Later Tang realm was overrun with mutinies in light of Emperor Zhuangzong's recent killing of major generals Guo Chongtao and Zhu Youqian without justification. When Li Siyuan was sent to combat mutineers at Yedu (鄴都, in modern Handan, Hebei), according to traditional accounts, his own soldiers mutinied and forced him to join the Yedu mutineers. Subsequently, he tried to send a number of officers, including Gao, to nearby Li Shaorong, to try to get Li Shaorong to join him in jointly acting against the mutineers, but Li Shaorong, suspecting Li Siyuan's intentions, did not respond, and subsequently reported to Emperor Zhuangzong that Li Siyuan had joined the mutiny. Unable to show himself to be still faithful to Emperor Zhuangzong, Li Siyuan headed south toward the capital Luoyang, where Emperor Zhuangzong was then killed in a mutiny before Li Siyuan reached there. When Li Siyuan arrived, he declared himself regent, and later emperor (as Emperor Mingzong).

Emperor Mingzong was said to respect Gao's abilities, and in 928, when Wang Du the military governor of Yiwu Circuit (義武, headquartered in modern Baoding, Hebei), whose domain had been semi-independent from the Later Tang imperial government, openly broke with the Later Tang, Gao served under the general Wang Yanqiu in quelling Wang Du's rebellion and had much accomplishment during the campaign. After the campaign against Wang Du, he was made the military prefect (團練使, Tuanlianshi) of Ying Prefecture (潁州, in modern Fuyang, Anhui). Early in Emperor Mingzong's Changxing era (930–933), as at that time Later Tang's northern borders were often attacked by the Khitan Empire, Gao was made the military governor of Zhenwu (振武, headquartered in modern Shuozhou, Shanxi) to help defend the border. The next year, as Emperor Mingzong was preparing for an operation against the de facto independent Dingnan Circuit's military governor Li Yichao (李彝超), Gao was made the military governor of Zhangwu Circuit (彰武, headquartered in modern Yan'an, Shaanxi) to prepare for the operation.

Li Congke later became emperor after Emperor Mingzong's death, and early in his Qingtai era (934–937), Gao was made the military governor of Zhaoyi Circuit (昭義, headquartered in modern Changzhi, Shanxi). When, in 936, Li Congke's brother-in-law (Emperor Mingzong's son-in-law) Shi Jingtang the military governor of Hedong rebelled against Li Congke and solicited aid from Khitan's Emperor Taizong, Li Congke commissioned the general Zhang Jingda as the commander of the overall operations against Shi and had Gao serve under Zhang. Zhang's army quickly put Hedong's capital Taiyuan under siege, but was subsequently crushed by the Liao emperor's army and forced to retreat to Jin'an Fortress (晉安寨, near Taiyuan) and then was surrounded there by the joint Liao/Hedong army, unable to fight its way out, but Zhang refused to surrender. Another general serving under Zhang, Yang Guangyuan, wanted to assassinate Zhang and surrender to the Liao/Hedong army. Gao, knowing this, often followed Zhang around the camp to protect him, but Zhang, not knowing this, in fact became suspicious of Gao's intentions, such that Gao did not dare to continue this. Eventually, Yang was able to assassinate Zhang and then surrender the Later Tang army to the Liao/Hedong army. (As, during the Jin'an siege, the Khitan emperor had created Shi the emperor of a new Later Jin (as its Emperor Gaozu), the surrendered Later Tang army was then folded into the Hedong army to become the Later Jin army.)

== Service during Later Jin ==
The joint Liao/Later Jin forces (now enlarged with the remnants of the Later Tang army at Jin'an) then engaged another Later Tang army sent to combat it, commanded by Zhao Dejun the military governor of Lulong, at Tuanbo Valley (團柏谷, in modern Jinzhong, Shanxi), crushing it. Zhao Dejun and his son Zhao Yanshou fled to and tried to defend Zhaoyi's capital Lu Prefecture (潞州). The Later Jin emperor sent Gao Xingzhou back to Zhaoyi, and when he reached Lu, he persuaded Zhao Dejun and Zhao Yanshou to surrender. With the Zhaos out of the way, nothing was left to block the Liao/Later Jin forces from advancing on the Later Tang capital Luoyang, and so, as Emperor Gaozu did so (Liao's Emperor Taizong opined that if he advanced on Luoyang with Khitan troops, the people would panic, and therefore chose not to), Li Congke and his family committed suicide, ending Later Tang. Emperor Gaozu entered Luoyang and took over the rest of the Later Tang realm. He allowed Gao to return to his post at Zhaoyi, and bestowed on Gao the honorary chancellor designation of Tong Zhongshu Menxia Pingzhangshi (同中書門下平章事).

In 937, Fan Yanguang the military governor of Tianxiong Circuit (天雄, headquartered at Yedu) rebelled against Emperor Gaozu. Initially, Emperor Gaozu ordered Gao to attack Yedu from the west, but then decided to attack Fan himself, instead making Gao the defender of Luoyang and the mayor of Henan Municipality (河南, i.e., the Luoyang region) to defend it in Emperor Gaozu's absence. Gao wanted to carry out a major construction project to remodel the palaces at Luoyang, but at the urging of the official Xue Rong (薛融), Emperor Gaozu did not approve the project. After Fan surrendered later in the year, Emperor Gaozu initially made Yang Guangyuan the military governor of Tianxiong, but later, fearing that Tianxiong was too powerful of a military command and Yang was difficult to control, decided to divide Tianxiong — carving out Yedu itself out as Guangjin Municipality (廣晉) and making Gao its defender and mayor, while dividing the rest of Tianxiong into two circuits.

In 941, as Emperor Gaozu went to Yedu, in anticipation of a rebellion by An Chongrong the military governor of Chengde Circuit (成德, headquartered in modern Shijiazhuang, Hebei), he apparently moved Gao back to Luoyang — for Gao was referred to as the defender of Luoyang when, shortly afterwards, An Congjin the military governor of Shannan East Circuit (山南東道, headquartered in modern Xiangyang, Hubei) rebelled. Emperor Gaozu's nephew Shi Chonggui the Prince of Zheng, whom Emperor Gaozu left in charge of then-capital Kaifeng (i.e., Daliang), commissioned Gao to head the army to be sent against An Congjin. The monitor of Gao's army, Zhang Cong'en (張從恩), quickly engaged An Congjin's army, surprising it and defeating it, forcing An Congjin to flee back to Shannan East's capital Xiang Prefecture (襄州). Gao put it under siege. In fall 942, Xiang Prefecture fell, and An Congjin committed suicide with his family. A few months earlier, Emperor Gaozu had died and was succeeded by Shi Chonggui as emperor. Shi Chonggui moved Gao to Guide Circuit (歸德, headquartered in modern Shangqiu, Henan), and gave him the greater honorary chancellor title of Shizhong (侍中).

Upon taking the throne, Shi Chonggui took a hardline position in relations with Khitan — refusing to subjugate Later Jin to Khitan, like Emperor Gaozu did. As a result, war began between the two states. In 944, during a major Khitan incursion (which, for some time, captured and held Yedu) to aid Yang (who had rebelled at Tianping Circuit), Gao was put in titular charge of the overall operations, but it was said that Shi Chonggui's trusted general Jing Yanguang, the commander of the imperial guards, was actually the one giving orders, causing the other generals to be displeased. During one of the battles, Khitan forces had Gao, Fu Yanqing, and Shi Gongba (石公霸) under siege at Qicheng (戚城, in modern Puyang, Henan). The city almost fell, and Jing did not come to its aid, but when three generals' request for emergency assistance reached Shi Chonggui, Shi Chonggui himself went to the city's rescue and lifted the siege. Shortly after this battle, Shi Chonggui relieved Jing of his post as the commanding general of the imperial guards, putting Gao in that position instead.

In 946, Shi Chonggui launched a major attack against Khitan, putting his uncle (husband of Emperor Gaozu's sister the Princess Song), Du Wei, in command of the army. Du, however, was not fully intending to attack Khitan. He advanced only half-heartedly, and his army was shortly thereafter trapped by the Khitan army under Emperor Taizong at Zhongdu Bridge (中度橋, in modern Baoding, Hebei). Shi Chonggui commissioned Gao to head a rescue force, with Fu serving as his deputy, but it appeared that before the army could be launched, Du surrendered to the Khitan emperor and subsequently served as the guide for the Khitan army south. Emperor Taizong shortly after approached Kaifeng. Shi Chonggui tried to commit suicide, but was stopped by his general Xue Chao (薛超). Subsequently, he surrendered to the Khitan, ending Later Jin.

== Between Later Jin's destruction and Later Han's firm establishment ==
After Shi Chonggui's surrender, both Gao Xingzhou and Fu Yanqing also went to the Khitan emperor's headquarters to surrender as well. Emperor Taizong changed the name of the Khitan state to Liao and declared himself the emperor of China as well as Khitan. Distrusting the Later Jin-commissioned military governors who came to Kaifeng to submit to him, he initially kept them at Kaifeng and did not send them back to their circuits. Further, he allowed the Khitan soldiers to pillage the circuits around Kaifeng, causing the people of the former Later Jin realm to rise in agrarian rebellions against Liao. As an attempt to quell these rebellions, he began to send military governors back to their circuits, but had Khitan soldiers escort them. Gao was apparently allowed to return to Guide during this wave of redeployments. Eventually, apparently sick of the rebellions and the heat, in summer 947, Emperor Taizong decided to head back to Khitan proper, leaving his brother-in-law Xiao Han in command at Kaifeng as the military governor of Xuanwu Circuit (宣武).

On the way back to Khitan proper, Emperor Taizong died near Heng Prefecture (恆州, Chengde's capital). By this time, the Later Jin general Liu Zhiyuan the military governor of Hedong had declared himself the emperor of a new Later Han, as its Emperor Gaozu. Further, the Liao imperial succession question was unsettled — as Zhao Yanshou tried to take over the southern realm (i.e., the parts of Later Jin that Liao still controlled) but was then arrested by Emperor Taizong's nephew Yelü Ruan the Prince of Yongkang (who then claimed the throne as Emperor Shizong), but whose succession was then still opposed by Emperor Taizong's powerful mother (Emperor Shizong's grandmother) Empress Dowager Shulü Ping. With more of the realm rising against Liao control, Xiao decided to extract himself from Kaifeng. He forced Emperor Mingzong of Later Tang's youngest son Li Congyi to accept the title of emperor, and then fled from Kaifeng.

Kaifeng was then virtually defenseless, as Xiao only left 1,000 soldiers from Lulong to serve as Li Congyi's guards. Li Congyi's adoptive mother (Emperor Mingzong's concubine) Consort Dowager Wang knew that the situation was untenable, but initially unsure what to do. She initially sent messengers to summon Gao from Guide and Wu Xingde (武行德) from Heyang Circuit (河陽, headquartered in modern Jiaozuo, Henan), hoping that they would support Li Congyi, but neither responded. (Gao did so by claiming an illness, and privately stated, "A fallen dynasty cannot be assisted, particularly when it is a child's game.") (Without support from Gao or Wu, Consort Dowager Wang decided to submit to the Later Han emperor. She had Li Congyi take the lesser title of Prince of Liang and sent emissaries to Emperor Gaozu, welcoming him to Kaifeng — but upon his arrival at Kaifeng, he had her and Li Congyi executed anyway.)

== Service during Later Han ==
After Emperor Gaozu entered Kaifeng, Gao Xingzhou went to Kaifeng to pay homage to him. Most former Later Jin generals formally submitted to Emperor Gaozu, including Du Chongwei (i.e., Du Wei, who by this point had restored his name to Du Chongwei, which had been changed to Du Wei to serve naming taboo for Shi Chonggui), who was then the military governor of Tianxiong. Du, in order to test Emperor Gaozu's attitude toward him, also offered to be moved to another circuit. Emperor Gaozu accepted his invitation and moved him to Guide and Gao to Tianxiong.

However, as Du was only using the offer to move to test Emperor Gaozu, he rebelled against Later Han as soon as he received news of the movement. Emperor Gaozu commissioned Gao as the commander of the army against Du and made Murong Yanchao (Emperor Gaozu's half-brother) the military governor of Zhenning Circuit (鎮寧, headquartered in modern Puyang) to be Gao's deputy. They headed to Yedu, but soon had major disagreements as to strategy — Gao wanted to siege the city patiently, while Murong wanted to attack it aggressively, with Murong claiming that Gao's strategy was motivated by the fact that Gao's daughter married Du's son. With Gao and Murong having disagreement, Emperor Gaozu decided to personally head to Yedu to oversee the campaign. When he arrived there, Gao continued to advocate the slow siege strategy, wanting to wear out the city's food supply and pointing out that the city was well-defended, so an aggressive attack would cause many casualties. With Murong continuing to accuse him, he also went to Emperor Gaozu's chief assistants Su Fengji and Yang Bin to plead his case — stuffing feces and dirt into his mouth as he was doing so, to analogize it to the kind of humiliation that he suffered from Murong. Emperor Gaozu believed Gao, went to his tent to thank him, and rebuked Murong.

Du agreed to surrender in winter 947, but Gao initially declined the Tianxiong command, as it neighbored Zhenning and he did not want further dealing with Murong. In response, Emperor Gaozu moved Murong to Tianping. He also created Gao the Prince of Linqing. In 950, by which time Emperor Gaozu had been succeeded by his son Emperor Yin (Emperor Gaozu's having died in 948), Emperor Yin moved Gao to Tianping. Emperor Yin also created him the Prince of Ye, and then changed the title to Prince of Qi upon the Tianping commission.

Emperor Yin, meanwhile, was displeased that much of the power, several years after Emperor Gaozu's death, was still in the hands of several generals/officials that Emperor Gaozu designated to assist him — Yang, Guo Wei, Shi Hongzhao, and Wang Zhang, with Yang overseeing general governance, Guo overseeing military campaigns, Shi overseeing the imperial guards, and Wang overseeing the financial matters. Later in 950, Emperor Yin decided to act against them; he ambushed Yang, Shi, and Wang, killing them, while sending secret orders to Yedu (where Guo was then stationed) to kill Guo and Guo's army monitor Wang Jun (which were intercepted by Guo and not carried out) while having Guo's and Wang Jun's families, which remained at Kaifeng, slaughtered. He summoned a number of military governors, including Gao, to Kaifeng, to help defend against any disturbances, but there were no records of Gao trying to intervene on either the emperor's side or Guo's side when Guo subsequently marched on Kaifeng, defeated the imperial troops, and took over the imperial government. (Guo initially declared that he was going to have Emperor Gaozu's nephew Liu Yun the military governor of Wuning Circuit (武寧, headquartered in modern Xuzhou, Jiangsu) made emperor, but with the soldiers supporting him to be emperor instead, soon declared himself emperor of a new Later Zhou as its Emperor Taizu.)

== Service during Later Zhou ==
The new Later Zhou emperor formally took the throne in spring 951, and most Later Han military governors formally submitted to him as emperor, including Gao Xingzhou and Murong Yanchao. (The main exception was Liu Chong the military governor of Hedong, the younger brother of Later Han's Emperor Gaozu (and father to Liu Yun, who was executed by Later Zhou), who declared himself the new emperor of Later Han, but whose state was subsequently known historically as Northern Han and not traditionally considered part of Later Han's history.) Murong, however, was apprehensive under Emperor Taizu due to his status as Emperor Gaozu's half-brother, so he gathered soldiers and food, considering a rebellion, and was in communications with Northern Han, Liao, and Southern Tang. To try to assuage concerns that Emperor Taizu may have about him, he repeatedly sent his attendant Zheng Lin (鄭麟) to Kaifeng to claim loyalty and to also spy on the imperial court, while submitting letters that he claimed were written by Gao in which the writer defamed the Later Zhou imperial government and offered an alliance with Murong. Emperor Taizu, however, did not believe that Gao had written these letters, and sent the letters to Gao. Gao responded by submitting a petition thanking the new emperor. Murong subsequently rebelled against Later Zhou, but his rebellion was put down by summer 952.

Gao died in fall 952. He was remembered as being brave and righteous, having great accomplishments but not arrogant, willing to personally face enemies in battle, and approachable with his staff members. He was given posthumous honors, including the title of Prince of Qin.

== Notes and references ==
- History of the Five Dynasties, vol. 123.
- New History of the Five Dynasties, vol. 48.
- Zizhi Tongjian, vols. 268, 269, 272, 274, 280, 281, 282, 283, 284, 285, 287, 288, 289, 290.
