= Li Congyi =

Emperor of China (Kaifeng region)
- In office 947–947
- Preceded by: Emperor Shizong of Liao
- Succeeded by: Liu Zhiyuan (Emperor Gaozu of Later Han)

Li Congyi (Chinese: 李從益) (931 – June 23, 947), known as the Prince of Xu (許王), was an imperial prince of the Later Tang dynasty of China. He was the youngest son of its second emperor, Li Siyuan (Emperor Mingzong). During the chaos following the destruction of the Later Tang's successor state, the Later Jin dynasty, he was forced to claim imperial title by Xiao Han, a general of the Liao dynasty (whose forces had destroyed the Later Jin), and was subsequently killed by Liu Zhiyuan, the founder of the succeeding Later Han dynasty.

== During Later Tang ==
Li Congyi was born in 931. He was Li Siyuan's youngest son and the only one born after he became emperor. His biological mother was a concubine of Li Siyuan's, but nothing further is known in history about her identity. Li Siyuan gave Li Congyi to his favorite concubine, Consort Wang, to raise. (Similarly, Consort Wang raised Li Congyi's younger sister, the later Princess Yong'an.)

In 933, Li Siyuan created Li Congyi the Prince of Xu, at the same time that he created his adoptive son Li Congke and nephews Li Congwen (李從溫), Li Congzhang (李從璋), and Li Congmin (李從敏) princes. (He already created his older biological sons Li Congrong and Li Conghou princes in 930, before Li Congyi's birth.)

Later in 933, Li Congrong tried to seize power in Li Siyuan's illness, but was defeated and killed. When Li Siyuan died shortly after, Li Conghou succeeded to the throne. Subsequently, Li Congyi's wet nurse Lady Wang was exposed to have had an affair with Li Congrong and put to death. Because of this, Li Conghou also suspected Li Congyi's adoptive mother Consort Wang, but did not take further actions against her.

In 934, Li Conghou was overthrown by Li Congke, who took the throne. In 936, Shi Jingtang — who had married Li Congyi's (and Li Congke's) sister the Princess of Jin and therefore was a brother-in-law — in turn, rebelled against Li Congke, initially declaring that as an adoptive son, Li Congke was unfit for the throne and should pass it to Li Congyi, but shortly after, with the support of the Khitan Liao Dynasty's Emperor Taizong, declared himself emperor of a new Later Jin, and attacked south toward the Later Tang capital Luoyang from his power base in Taiyuan after the joint Liao/Later Jin forces defeated the Later Tang forces Li Congke sent against him. The situation at Luoyang appeared hopeless, and Li Congke prepared for a mass suicide of his family members by fire. Li Congyi's mother Consort Wang (who then carried the title of consort dowager) tried to persuade Li Siyuan's wife, Empress Dowager Cao, who was the birth mother of the Princess of Jin, not to join in the mass suicide, but was unable to persuade the empress dowager. The empress dowager, however, urged her to live on, and so she took Li Congyi and Princess Yong'an, and hid in a polo field, while Empress Dowager Cao, Li Congke, Li Congke's immediate family members, and a number of officers loyal to him committed suicide by fire. Shi arrived at Luoyang shortly after and took over the realm.

== During Later Jin ==
After Later Jin's takeover of Later Tang territory, Shi Jingtang created Li Congyi's sister, the Later Tang Princess of Jin, empress. The empress took Li Congyi and Consort Dowager Wang into the palace, personally raised Li Congyi, and honored Consort Dowager Wang like a mother. In 939, Shi Jingtang created Li Congyi the Duke of Xun and had him be in charge of offering sacrifices to five emperors of the Tang dynasty (which the Later Tang claimed to be the legitimate successor to) and Later Tang — Emperor Gaozu of Tang, Emperor Taizong of Tang, Emperor Zhuangzong of Later Tang, Emperor Mingzong of Later Tang, and Emperor Min of Later Tang — at Zhide Palace (至德宮), where Consort Dowager Wang and Li Congyi resided.

Shi Jingtang died in 942, and was succeeded as emperor by his nephew Shi Chonggui. After Shi Chonggui's succession, Consort Dowager Wang and Li Congyi returned to Luoyang and took up residence there.

In contrast to Shi Jingtang's view of the Emperor Taizong of Liao (who had changed the name of his state to Liao by this point) as a benefactor — going as far as referring to himself as "Son Emperor" and "subject" while honoring the Emperor Taizong of Liao as "Father Emperor" — Shi Chonggui, at the advice of the general Jing Yanguang, took a confrontational stance against the Liao dynasty, initially only referring to himself as "grandson" and not as subject, and eventually went as far as closing the Liao trade office, seizing its assets, and killing Khitan merchants. This led to repeated Liao incursions. In 946, Shi Chonggui launched a punitive expedition, commanded by the generals Du Wei (the husband of one of Shi Jingtang's sisters) and Li Shouzhen, but the Emperor Taizong of Liao defeated and then induced Du and Li Shouzhen to surrender to him. He then attacked south. With nearly the entire Later Jin army given to Du and Li Shouzhen for the expedition, Kaifeng was defenseless, and Shi Chonggui surrendered, ending the Later Jin.L dynasty.

== After Later Jin's destruction ==
After the Emperor Taizong of Liao entered Kaifeng, he claimed to be the orthodox emperor of China (i.e., the former Later Jin realm) as well. Meanwhile, the wife of the Liao general Zhao Yanshou (who was previously a Later Tang general — having married a daughter of Li Siyuan's (sister of Li Congyi's), the Princess of Yan — but who had served Liao ever since his capture by Emperor Taizong in the campaign of Later Tang's destruction) had died by this point, and Emperor Taizong thus wanted to give Princess Yong'an to Zhao in marriage as his next wife. As her mother, Consort Dowager Wang went to Kaifeng for the ceremony. When Emperor Taizong saw her, he, claiming that he and Li Siyuan had previously agreed to be blood brothers, bowed to her, greeting her as a sister-in-law. Meanwhile, Liu Suining (劉遂凝), whose father, the Later Liang general Liu Xun, had been Consort Dowager Wang's master, asked her to intercede for him to ask for a military governorship, and she did. Emperor Taizong thus commissioned Liu Suining as the military governor of Anyuan Circuit (安遠, headquartered in modern Xiaogan, Hubei). He also commissioned Li Congyi as the military governor of Weixin Circuit (威信, headquartered in modern Heze, Shandong) and created Li Congyi the Prince of Xu. Believing that Li Congyi was still too young, Consort Dowager Wang declined the opportunity to have him report to the post, and took him back to Luoyang.

Emperor Taizong, despite his desire to rule over the former Later Jin realms, treated it poorly, allowing his soldiers to pillage the realm. This led to many armed rebellions against him, and he, troubled by the situation, decided to head back to Khitan territory, leaving his brother-in-law Xiao Han in charge at Kaifeng. He became ill on the way, and died near Heng Prefecture (恆州, in modern Shijiazhuang), plunging the succession into a battle between his nephew Yelü Ruan (supported by the army that attacked south, and who then declared himself emperor, as Emperor Shizong) and his brother Yelü Lihu (supported by his mother Empress Dowager Shulü). Xiao wanted to abandon Kaifeng himself, particularly with one of the rebellion leaders, the Later Jin general Liu Zhiyuan (who had declared himself the emperor of a new Later Han) bearing down toward Luoyang and Kaifeng, but feared that, with Han rebellions already overtaken the realm, if he simply abandoned Kaifeng, he might be caught in such a disturbance that he could not withdraw safely. He sent the officer Gao Mohan (高謨翰) to Luoyang under the name of the deceased Emperor Taizong, summoning Consort Dowager Wang and Li Congyi to Kaifeng. Consort Dowager Wang and Li Congyi tried to hide themselves at Li Siyuan's tomb, but were discovered by Gao and his soldiers and forced to report to Kaifeng. Once there, Xiao declared Li Congyi emperor and, after leaving some of the soldiers from Lulong Circuit (盧龍, headquartered in modern Beijing, ceded by Shi Jingtang to Liao in appreciation of its support of him) to help defend Kaifeng, departed.

Consort Dowager Wang realized that this left her and Li Congyi in a disastrous position, and when the officials left at Kaifeng greeted her, she wept and stated, "We, mother and son, are left in such a vulnerable position, but you, lords, pushed us to this position; this will bring disaster on our household!" She tried to firm up Kaifeng's defenses by summoning Gao Xingzhou the military governor of Guide Circuit (歸德, headquartered in modern Shangqiu, Henan) and Wu Xingde (武行德) the military governor of Heyang Circuit (河陽, headquartered in modern Jiaozuo, Henan), but neither paid her any heed. She, in fear, stated to the officials, "We, mother and son, had been forced by Xiao Han into destruction. But you, lords, are sinless. You should quickly welcome the new emperor to seek your own fortune. Do not worry about us!" The officials were touched by her, and none left. When she subsequently consulted them, some advocated resisting Liu, arguing that if they could hold out for a month, Liao would send reinforcements. Consort Dowager Wang, however, believed that resistance would be useless and that a siege would be disastrous to the people of Kaifeng, and therefore resolved to surrender. She thus had Li Congyi, using the lesser title of Prince of Liang, submit a petition welcoming Liu to Kaifeng, and they moved out of the palace into a private residence.

This overture, however, could not save her or Li Congyi. Liu subsequently entered Luoyang and, receiving the petition, sent his officer Guo Congyi (郭從義) to Kaifeng with instructions to kill Consort Dowager Wang and Li Congyi. As Consort Dowager Wang was facing death, she wept and stated, "My son was put into this position by the Khitan. What crime did he have to deserve death? Why not allow him to live, such that each year, at Cold Food Festival, he could sacrifice a bowl of wheat grains to the tomb of Emperor Mingzong?" It was said that whoever heard of what she said were touched to weep for their fate.

== Notes and references ==
- History of the Five Dynasties, vol. 51.
- New History of the Five Dynasties, vol. 15.
- Zizhi Tongjian, vols. 278, 280, 282, 286, 287.

Preceded by Emperor Shizong of Liao	Emperor of China (Kaifeng region); 947	Succeeded by Liu Zhiyuan (Emperor Gaozu of Later Han)
