= Wu Zhen (historian) =

11th-century Chinese historian

- Traditional Chinese: 吳縝
- Simplified Chinese: 吴缜
Transcriptions
Standard Mandarin
- Hanyu Pinyin: Wú Zhěn
- Wade–Giles: Wu^{2} Chên^{3}

Wu Tingzhen
- Traditional Chinese: 吳廷珍
- Simplified Chinese: 吴廷珍
Transcriptions
Standard Mandarin
- Hanyu Pinyin: Wú Tíngzhēn
- Wade–Giles: Wu^{2} T'ing^{2}-chên^{1}

Wu Zhen (fl. 11th century), courtesy name Tingzhen, was a historian of the Chinese Northern Song dynasty. He is known for writing two books enumerating mistakes found in the New Book of Tang and Historical Records of the Five Dynasties, both of which were authored by Ouyang Xiu (Ouyang had several co-authors with New Book of Tang). As pointed out in the 18th-century Siku Quanshu, Wu Zhen was "inclined to criticise for the sake of criticism".

== Works ==
Although he apparently wrote other works (including a monograph on the Five Dynasties period Later Liang dynasty), Wu Zhen's only 2 surviving books are:

- Xin Tang Shu Jiumiu (新唐書紏謬; "Correcting Mistakes in the New Book of Tang"), published in 1089, in 20 chapters. It enumerated 400 mistakes of the New Book of Tang.
- Wudai Shiji Zuanwu (五代史記纂誤; "Compendium of Errors in the Historical Records of the Five Dynasties"), published c. 1090, in 3 chapters, later lost but partly recovered in the 18th century. It enumerated 200 mistakes of the Historical Records of the Five Dynasties, but the recovered version only contained 112.

Both were published after Ouyang Xiu's death in 1072. In the first book's preface, Wu Zhen blasted the New Book of Tang as the worst official history book ever written.
