= Zhao Yanshou =

Chinese general and politician

Zhao Yanshou (Chinese: 趙延壽; died November 10, 948), né Liu Yanshou (劉延壽), formally the Prince of Wei (魏王), was a Chinese military general, monarch, poet, and politician. He served as major general of Later Tang of the Chinese Five Dynasties and Ten Kingdoms period, as well as the Khitan Liao dynasty. He first became prominent as a son-in-law of Later Tang's second emperor Li Siyuan, but was captured by Liao's Emperor Taizong when Later Tang fell. He subsequently served Emperor Taizong, who promised him that he would be made the emperor of China if helped Emperor Taizong destroy Later Tang's successor state Later Jin. Emperor Taizong reneged on the promise after doing so, however, leading to Zhao's attempt to seize Liao's Chinese territory after Emperor Taizong's death. He was, however, arrested by Emperor Taizong's nephew and successor Emperor Shizong and held until his death.

== Background ==
It is not known when Zhao Yanshou—then carrying the birth surname of Liu and probably already using the personal name Yanshou—was born. However, it is known that his birth father Liu Yuan (劉邧) served as the magistrate of Xiu County (蓨縣, in modern Hengshui, Hebei), and that his mother was a Lady Zhong. Sometime during the Kaiping era (907-910) of Zhu Quanzhong the emperor of Later Liang, Zhao Xingshi, then an officer under Liu Shouwen the military governor (Jiedushi) of Yichang Circuit (義昌, headquartered in modern Cangzhou, Hebei), raided Xiu and captured both Liu Yanshou and his mother Lady Zhong. Zhao then took Liu Yanshou as an adoptive son.

Zhao Yanshou was said to be handsome in his youth. He studied the Confucian classics and history, and was capable in writing poems. He also favored hosting guests. After his adoptive father Zhao Xingshi (after Liu Shouwen had been defeated and captured by his brother Liu Shouguang, who later declared himself the emperor of Yan), defected to Jin, Zhao Xingshi was treated well by Jin's prince Li Cunxu, who bestowed Tang dynasty imperial clan name Li on Zhao Xingshi and gave him a new name of Shaobin. Meanwhile, Zhao Yanshou married a daughter of Li Cunxu's adoptive brother, the major general Li Siyuan.

== Service during Later Tang ==
=== Before and during Li Siyuan's reign ===
Sometime after Li Cunxu claimed the title of emperor of a new Later Tang and subsequently destroyed Later Liang, taking over its territory, Zhao Yanshou was commissioned a military commander at Bian Prefecture (汴州, in modern Kaifeng, Henan).

In 926, Li Cunxu was killed in a mutiny at the capital Luoyang. Li Siyuan subsequently claimed imperial title. The generals that Li Cunxu previously had bestowed the surnames of Li on all requested to return to their original names, Li Shaobin included. Li Siyuan allowed Li Shaobin, who was then the military governor of Lulong Circuit (盧龍, headquartered in modern Beijing), to again take his original surname of Zhao, but gave him a new name of Dejun. Meanwhile, Zhao Yanshou's wife was created the Princess Xingping, and on the account of that marital relationship, Zhao Dejun became much favored by Li Siyuan. Zhao Yanshou himself was commissioned the prefect of Ru Prefecture (汝州, in modern Pingdingshan, Henan). He later successively served as the military governor of Heyang Circuit (河陽, in modern Jiaozuo, Henan) and Guide Circuit (歸德, headquartered in modern Shangqiu, Henan), and then was recalled to the imperial government to serve as the director of palace affairs (宣徽使, Xuanhuishi).

In 931, Zhao Yanshou was promoted to serve as Li Siyuan's chief of staff (Shumishi), serving with Fan Yanguang. However, as Zhao was replacing the long-time chief of staff An Chonghui, whose domination of the court scene eventually led to his downfall and death, both he and Fan feared the same fate and therefore avoided ruling on important matters. That allowed LI Siyuan's favorite concubine Consort Wang and the eunuch Meng Hanqiong to take control over much of the important affairs of state. While serving as chief of staff, Zhao also carried the military governorship of Wuning Circuit (武寧, headquartered in modern Xuzhou, Jiangsu).

In 932, Zhao was given the chancellor designation of Tong Zhongshu Menxia Pingzhangshi (同中書門下平章事), and later, both he and Fan were given the greater chancellor title of Shizhong. By that time, Li Siyuan's then-oldest-surviving son Li Congrong the Prince of Qin, who was considered Li Siyuan's likely heir, was showing so much contempt for the imperial officials such that both Liu and Fan requests to leave the imperial administration to avoid conflict with Li Congrong. However, Li Siyuan was angered by their requests, believing that they were abandoning him. After further requests on his behalf by his wife (who by then was carrying the title of Princess of Qi), Li Siyuan relented, and allowed Zhao to leave to serve as the military governor of Xuanwu Circuit (宣武, headquartered at Bian Prefecture), replacing him with Zhu Hongzhao. (Fan was later also allowed to leave to serve as the military governor of Chengde Circuit (成德, headquartered in modern Shijiazhuang, Hebei); he was replaced by Feng Yun.) Subsequently, in Li Siyuan's illness, Li Congrong tried to seize control of the imperial government, but was defeated and killed by the imperial guards under Zhu's and Feng's orders. When Li Siyuan subsequently died, another son of Li Siyuan's, Li Conghou the Prince of Song, succeeded him as emperor.

=== After Li Siyuan's reign ===
After Li Conghou took the throne, Zhu Hongzhao and Fen Yun remained the most powerful figures at court. They were suspicious of Li Conghou's older adoptive brother Li Congke the Prince of Lu, who was then the military governor of Fengxiang Circuit (鳳翔, headquartered in modern Baoji, Shaanxi), and brother-in-law Shi Jingtang who was then the military governor of Hedong Circuit (河東, headquartered in modern Taiyuan, Shanxi). In spring 934, they, not wanting Shi to remain at Hedong for long and wanting to recall Meng Hanqiong from Tianxiong Circuit (天雄, headquartered in modern Handan, Hebei) (where Meng had been ever since being sent there to temporarily overseeing the circuit when Li Conghou, then the military governor of Tianxiong, was recalled to inherit the throne), issued a number of orders in their capacities as chiefs of staff, transferring Li Congke from Fengxiang to Hedong, Shi from Hedong to Chengde, and Fan Yanguang from Chengde to Tianxiong. However, Li Congke, believing that these moves were intended to target him, rebelled. He quickly fought his way to Luoyang. Zhu committed suicide; Feng was killed by the imperial guard general An Congjin; and Li Conghou fled, but was later killed by emissaries sent by Li Congke. Li Congke took the throne as emperor.

After Li Congke's victory, he considered keeping Shi at Luoyang, as the two of them also did not get along previously. (Shi had launched his own troops from Hedong toward Luoyang, initially intending to support Li Conghou, but with Li Congke quickly becoming victorious, he not only failed to support Li Conghou but, when encountering Li Conghou in flight, killed Li Conghou's guard soldiers and leaving Li Conghou subsequently unable to escape Li Congke's emissaries.) However, his officials Han Zhaoyin and Li Zhuanmei (李專美), believing that showing that he distrusted Shi would cause fear in Zhao Yanshou and Zhao's father Zhao Dejun as well (as both Shi and Zhao were his brothers-in-law), urged against detaining Shi. Li Congke thus sent Shi back to Hedong.

In 935, Li Congke recalled Zhao Yanshou from Xuanwu and made him chief of staff again. He was also given the military governorship of Zhongwu Circuit (忠武, headquartered in modern Xuchang, Henan). (He replaced Fan, who had previously been recalled to serve as chief of staff but was at this point made the military governor of Tianxiong.) Around this time, he was also created the Duke of Lu.

When Zhao was commissioned, he was initially serving as chief of staff concurrently with Han Zhaoyin. However, shortly after he became chief of staff, Han was sent out to serve as the military governor of Huguo Circuit (護國, headquartered in modern Yuncheng, Shanxi), and replaced by Fang Gao. It was said that, though, while Zhao and Fang served as chiefs of staff, their opinions were actually not being listened to much, with the deputy chief of staff Liu Yanlang (劉延朗) and Xue Wenyu (薛文遇), a scholar in residence at the office of the chief of staff, making more of the actual decisions.

In 936, in order to test Shi's loyalty, Li Congke issued an edict moving him to Tianping Circuit (天平, headquartered in modern Tai'an, Shandong) and moving Song Shenqian (宋審虔) the military governor of Heyang to Hedong, to replace him. In response, Shi rebelled and sought aid from Khitan Empire's Emperor Taizong. (The Khitan Empire would later be known as Liao dynasty, but at that time was not yet known as Liao.) Initially, the general that Li Congke sent to attack Hedong, Zhang Jingda, was quite successful, putting Hedong's capital Taiyuan under siege, but after Liao relief force, personally commanded by Emperor Taizong, arrived there, Zhang's army was crushed and itself surrounded by the combined Liao/Hedong forces at Jin'an Base (晉安寨, near Taiyuan). Li Congke ordered Zhao Dejun to aid Zhang's surrounded army, and, at the suggestion of the chancellor Zhang Yanlang and the imperial scholar He Ning, sent Zhao Yanshou with an army to rendezvous with his father.

Emperor Taizong declared Shi the emperor of China, as the founding emperor of a new Later Jin, intending to have him replace Li Congke. (In return, Shi agreed to cede 16 northern prefectures—modern northern Hebei, northern Shanxi, Beijing, and Tianjin—including all of Lulong, to Liao.) Zhao Dejun, however, was also secretly intending to replace Li Congke, and he sent secret communications with Emperor Taizong, offering peace with Shi if Emperor Taizong would support him instead. He did not try to advance to Jin'an as the negotiations were ongoing, but Emperor Taizong eventually cut off negotiations with him and intensified the siege on Jin'an. Zhang's army's food supplies ran out, and his deputy, the general Yang Guangyuan, killed him and then surrendered. The combined Liao/Later Jin forces then advanced on Zhao's position, and Zhao's army also collapsed. Zhao Dejun and Zhao Yanshou fled and took up position at Lu Prefecture (潞州, in modern Changzhi, Shanxi), but when the Liao/Later Jin forces advanced there, one Later Tang general who had surrendered to Liao/Later Jin with Yang, Gao Xingzhou, persuaded them that defending Lu was futile, so they opened the city gates and surrendered. Emperor Taizong had the two of them locked up and delivered to his capital Linhuang (臨潢, in modern Chifeng, Inner Mongolia), to pay homage to his mother Empress Dowager Shulü Ping. Empress Dowager Shulü rebuked Zhao Dejun for his hypocrisy, and Zhao Dejun, in depression, died in 937, while Zhao Yanshou remained at the Khitan court. (Meanwhile, Shi advanced south to Luoyang. Li Congke, finding the situation hopeless, committed suicide with his family, ending Later Tang and allowing Shi's Later Jin to take over the Later Tang territory.)

== Service during Liao dynasty ==
=== During Emperor Taizong's reign ===
After Zhao Dejun's death 936, Emperor Taizong commissioned Zhao Yanshou the military governor of Lulong, and created him the Prince of Yan.

According to the Zizhi Tongjian, when Emperor Taizong changed Khitan's name to Liao in 937 (although in various sources, there are substantial disagreements as to when this name change occurred), he adopted much of the Chinese governmental structure, and he commissioned Zhao Yanshou as his chief of staff. He also shortly after commissioned him as a chancellor—with the Liao-unique title of Zhengshi Ling (政事令).

In 938, Emperor Taizong sent an emissary to Luoyang, ordering that Shi Jingtang release Zhao Yanshou's wife—whom Shi had, as a sister-in-law, created the Grand Princess of Yan—to Liao. The emissary subsequently brought her back to Liao to reunite with Zhao. It was said that Zhao appreciated Emperor Taizong's doing this that he subsequently was even more dedicated to the Liao cause.

Shi Jingtang died in 942, and was succeeded by his nephew Shi Chonggui. Shi Chonggui immediately took a more confrontational stance toward Liao, as opposed to the submissive stance that Shi Jingtang took. (In particular, while Shi Jingtang submitted petitions to Emperor Taizong (showing himself to be a subject), he also referred to himself as "subject" and "son" when communicating with Emperor Taizong, whom he referred to as "father," while Shi Chonggui wrote letters (i.e., not as a subject) and referred to himself only as "grandson" and Emperor Taizong as "grandfather," refusing to acknowledge a subservient position on a state-to-state basis.) Emperor Taizong was displeased, and Zhao, who wanted to replace Shi Chonggui as emperor of China, repeatedly suggested that Emperor Taizong attack Later Jin. Emperor Taizong agreed and put Zhao in charge of the project of an eventual invasion against Later Jin, promising that if he succeeded, he would be made emperor.

In 944, Emperor Taizong launched his attack, with Zhao Yanshou and Zhao Yanzhao (趙延照) serving as forward commanders. The Liao army quickly reached Tianxiong, upon which Emperor Taizong created Zhao Yanshou the Prince of Wei and commissioned him the military governor of Weibo Circuit (魏博, i.e., Tianxiong). Hearing of the Liao attack, Yang Guangyuan, who had been in secret communications with Liao, openly rebelled against Shi Chonggui at Pinglu Circuit (平盧, headquartered in modern Weifang, Shandong). Liao forces' attempts to cross the Yellow River to aid Yang, however, repeatedly failed, and Emperor Taizong decided to withdraw. Yang's son Yang Chengxun (楊承勳) subsequently arrested his father and surrendered.

In winter 944, Emperor Taizong launched a second invasion into Later Jin territory, again with Zhao Yanshou serving as his forward commander. Subsequently, when Zhao could not capture Xiang Prefecture (相州, in modern Handan) quickly, the Liao army withdrew. Believing this to be a sign of weakness on Liao's part, Shi ordered the Later Jin forces to attack north, with most of the army under his uncle-by-marriage, Du Wei, and Li Shouzhen. They captured Liao's Tai Prefecture (泰州, in modern Baoding, Hebei). However, a major Liao counterattack subsequently surrounded the Later Jin army. A Later Jin charge, led by the general Fu Yanqing, however, led to a general collapse of the Liao army, with Emperor Taizong barely escaping the battle, although Du and Li then judged it inadvisable to chase the Liao forces further, and withdrew back to Ding Prefecture (定州, in modern Baoding). As a result of this defeat, Emperor Taizong caned all of his general several hundred times, but did not punish Zhao.

In 946, there were rumors that Zhao Yanshou was planning on defecting to Later Jin. This rumor was believed by the Later Jin chiefs of staff Li Song and Feng Yu. They had Du write a letter to Zhao, encouraging him to do so, with the officer Zhao Xingshi (sharing the name that Zhao Yanshou's father used to use), who had previously served under Zhao Yanshou, delivering the letter. Zhao Yanshou wrote back (to try to lead Later Jin forces into a trap), stating, "I have long been in a foreign land, and I want to return to China. Please launch a major army to support me, so that I can pull myself out and return with it." Subsequently, under Emperor Taizong's orders, Liao's prefect of Ying Prefecture (瀛州, in modern Cangzhou), Liu Yanzuo (劉延祚), also offered to defect to Later Jin. Shi thus put Du and Li Shouzhen in command of an army to attack north, with the stated objectives being to first recapture the prefectures previously ceded to Liao, and then to destroy Liao. When Du and Li Shouzhen advanced, though, they were met by a large army that Emperor Taizong personally commanded. The Liao army eventually surrounded the Later Jin army at Zhongdu Bridge (中度橋, in modern Baoding). After Emperor Taizong made the promise to Du to make him emperor if he surrendered, Du and Li Shouzhen surrendered their army. Emperor Taizong had Zhao comfort the Later Jin soldiers and told him that the Later Jin army was now his, and then prepared to advance south. With virtually the entire Later Jin army having been given to Du and Li Shouzhen for this northern campaign, then-Later Jin capital Daliang was left essentially defenseless, and Shi Chonggui felt compelled to surrender, ending Later Jin. Emperor Taizong subsequently entered Daliang.

Rather than creating Zhao emperor, as he had promised, however, Emperor Taizong postured to the Later Jin officials and the general population that he was now their emperor. Distrusting the Later Jin army that surrendered to him, he considered slaughtering the entire army. Zhao, however, pointed out to him that doing so would leave Later Jin's borders with Later Shu to the southwest and Southern Tang to the southeast completely unguarded, and was able to persuade him not to carry out a massacre. Emperor Taizong thereafter made Zhao's son Zhao Kuangzan (趙匡贊) the military governor of Huguo. Meanwhile, though, when Zhao suggested that tax revenues be used to purchase food supplies for the Liao soldiers, Emperor Taizong instead had his soldiers pillage the surrounding regions for food, causing them to kill many Han civilians and thereafter causing much Han resistance to Liao rule.

Meanwhile, having realized that Emperor Taizong had no intention to fulfill his promise, Zhao Yanshou became upset. He, through Li Song, expressed to Emperor Taizong the sentiment that he no longer wished to be emperor, but would be satisfied being Crown Prince. Emperor Taizong, rejecting the idea, stated, "When it comes to the Prince of Wei, I would not even hesitate to cut my own flesh. However, the Crown Prince needs to be the son of the Son of Heaven. How can the Prince of Wei be Crown Prince?" He then ordered that additional honors be considered for Zhao. At the suggestion of the imperial scholar Zhang Li (張礪), he gave Zhao the titles of defender of the central capital (i.e., Heng Prefecture (恆州, in modern Shijiazhuang, Hebei)), and Grand Chancellor, in addition to continuing to have him be chief of staff. Also around the same time, with his wife the Princess of Yan's having died in 942, he married her younger sister as his second wife.

Shortly after, tired of Han rebellions, Emperor Taizong decided to return to Liao proper. He left his brother-in-law Xiao Han in charge at Daliang, and returned with the main Liao forces north. Zhao accompanied Emperor Taizong back north. Emperor Taizong became ill on the way, however, and died at Shahu Forest (殺胡林, in modern Shijiazhuang) in summer 947.

=== After Emperor Taizong's death ===
The traditional sources' description of what Zhao Yanshou's actions were after Emperor Taizong's death were divergent.

=== History of the Five Dynasties/Zizhi Tongjian account ===
In the "Chinese" version of the events, as characterized by the History of the Five Dynasties and later as adopted by the Zizhi Tongjian, Zhao Yangshou, still angry over Emperor Taizong's failure to honor his promise, swore never to again return to Liao proper, and, upon Emperor Taizong's death, took his own forces and entered Heng Prefecture, not far from Shahu Forest. However, the Khitan generals, including Emperor Taizong's nephew Yelü Ruan the Prince of Yongkang and the overseers of Liao's northern and southern headquarters, each then also entered Heng. Zhao considered closing the gates to stop them from entering, but also feared of losing their support, and therefore allowed them in.

Meanwhile, the Khitan generals had already conferred with each other and decided to support Yelü Ruan as Emperor Taizong's successor, and as part of that decision, Yelü Ruan accepted submissive bows from his uncles and younger cousins. (This constituted a diversion of the succession plans previously laid by Empress Dowager Shulü and Emperor Taizong, who designated his younger brother (also born of Empress Dowager Shulü), Yelü Lihu, as his heir; during the campaign against Later Jin, Yelü Lihu remained at Linhuang with Empress Dowager Shulü and did not participate.) Not knowing this, Zhao only supplied Yelü Ruan with the same level of supplies as any other Liao general, causing Yelü Ruan to be displeased. Zhao also claimed that Emperor Taizong had left a will making him in charge of the Southern Court (i.e., the former Later Jin territory).

Over the next few days, Zhao requested that Yelü Ruan turn over the control of the gates and the storages at Heng—as Yelü Ruan had his soldiers take control of the gates and the storages as soon as he entered the city. Yelü Ruan refused. He also continued to meet with the other Khitan generals. Zhao's strategists suggested to him that there must be something that the Khitan generals were up to, and suggested that he act against them first, using the Han troops that he had with him. He hesitated, however. Meanwhile, he also prepared for a grand ceremony where he would apparently ascend a throne and, while not taking imperial title, he would let the other officials, including as high-level officials as chancellors, bow to him. Li Song, pointing out that it was unclear yet whether the Khitan generals would agree to this, urged him not to carry out this ceremony. Zhao agreed.

Shortly after, Yelü Ruan invited Zhao, Zhang Li, and the former Later Jin chancellors He Ning, Li Song, and Feng Dao to a feast. At the feast, Yelü Ruan told Zhao that Yelü Ruan's wife, who had previously agreed to a brotherly-sisterly relationship with Zhao and called him "older brother," had arrived from Linhuang, and wanted to see him. Zhao, not suspecting anything, entered Yelü Ruan's living quarters to meet her. Once inside the living quarters, he was seized and put under arrest. Several days later, Yelü Ruan public declared himself emperor (as Emperor Shizong). (He subsequently defeated an army that Empress Dowager Shulü launched to resist him, and forced her into relinquishing her powers and staying for the rest of her life at the tomb of her husband (his grandfather) Emperor Taizu of Liao.) When Zhao's son Zhao Kuangzan was later informed of these events and further heard rumors that Emperor Shizong had killed Zhao Yanshou, he first submitted to Later Shu, but then to Later Han (founded by the Later Jin general Liu Zhiyuan the military governor of Hedong and which then took over most of Later Jin's former territory); Zhao Kuangzan would subsequently serve Later Han's successor states Later Zhou and Song dynasty as well, never returning to Liao. In reality, though, Zhao had not been killed, and would not die until 948.

=== History of Liao account ===
The History of Liao, however, described none of these conflicts. Rather, it had a terse assertion that after Emperor Shizong took the throne, he rewarded Zhao Yanshou for having supported him in taking the throne, and had Zhao remain as his chief of staff, until Zhao's death in 948. Indeed, the chronicles of Emperor Shizong's reign indicated that Zhao also remained as the defender of the southern capital (i.e., Lulong's capital Youdu (幽都)) until his death.

== Notes and references ==
- History of Liao, vol. 76.
- History of the Five Dynasties, vol. 98.
- Zizhi Tongjian, vols. 275, 277, 278, 279, 280, 281, 283, 284, 285, 286, 287.
