= Fan Yanguang =

Chinese general and politician

- 范延光
- Died: 30 September 940
- Other name: Zihuan
- Military career
- Rank: General

Fan Yanguang (范延光) (died 30 September 940), courtesy name Zihuan (子環) (per the History of the Five Dynasties) or Zigui (子瓌) (per the New History of the Five Dynasties), formally the Prince of Dongping (東平王), was a general from the state of Later Tang and Later Jin during the Chinese Five Dynasties and Ten Kingdoms period. He was a close associate of the Later Tang's second emperor Li Siyuan, serving three terms as Li Siyuan's chief of staff (Shumishi), and subsequently continued to serve as a general. After the Later Tang's final emperor Li Congke (Li Siyuan's adoptive son) was overthrown by Li Siyuan's son-in-law Shi Jingtang, who founded Later Jin, Fan initially formally submitted, but later rebelled against Shi. His rebellion, however, was not successful, and after Shi promised to spare him, he surrendered. He was, nevertheless, later killed by Shi's general Yang Guangyuan, probably with Shi's implicit, if not explicit, approval.

== Background ==
It is not known when Fan Yanguang was born, but it is known that he was from Linzhang (臨漳, in modern Handan, Hebei). In his youth, he came to serve as a guard at the prefectural government of Xiang Prefecture (相州), which Linzhang belonged to. When Li Siyuan, then a general of Jin under his adoptive brother Li Cunxu the Prince of Jin, was serving as the prefect of Xiang Prefecture, Fan became part of his guard corps.

By 923, Li Cunxu had declared himself emperor of a new Later Tang, and at that time was facing off against the army of archrival Later Liang across the Yellow River. In spring 923, he sent Li Siyuan to launch a surprise attack across the Yellow River against Later Liang's Tianping Circuit (天平, headquartered in modern Tai'an, Shandong), and Li Siyuan was able to surprise Tianping's garrison and capture it. In the aftermaths of Tianping's fall, the Later Liang officer Kang Yanxiao, formerly a Jin subject, sent a secret letter to Li Siyuan, offering to surrender. Li Siyuan believed that it was important to inform Li Cunxu right away, but as Tianping was deep in Later Liang territory, he did not know whom he could send to deliver the letter. Fan volunteered, and was able to deliver the letter to Li Cunxu. As the Later Liang general Wang Yanzhang at that time was attacking the Yangliu (楊劉, in modern Liaocheng, Shandong), a fort on the Yellow River then held by Later Tang, hoping to cut off the supply route between Tianping and Later Tang proper entirely, Fan argued that Yangliu's defense was strong and suggested to Li Cunxu that another fort be built at Majiakou (馬家口, also in modern Liaocheng) while Yangliu was being sieged, rather than to go to Yangliu's aid immediately. Li Cunxu agreed and built Majiakou, which Wang then attacked. Li Siyuan again sent Fan to suggest to Li Cunxu to reinforce Majiakou, but Fan was captured by Later Liang sentry soldiers on the way and taken to the Later Liang capital Daliang. There, he was whipped several hundred times and threatened with swords, but did not reveal Later Tang military secrets. After Li Cunxu captured Daliang in a surprise attack later in the year and the Later Liang emperor Zhu Zhen committed suicide, ending Later Liang, Li Cunxu rewarded him with the honorary titles Yinqing Guanglu Daifu (銀青光祿大夫) and minister of public works (工部尚書, Gongbu Shangshu).

== During Li Siyuan's reign ==
In 926, Li Cunxu was killed in a mutiny at then-Later Tang capital Luoyang. Li Siyuan, who had led one of the rebellions against him, quickly arrived at Luoyang and claimed imperial title. He commissioned Fan Yanguang as one of the directors of palace affairs (宣徽使, Xuanhuishi).

Meanwhile, one of the rebel leaders against Li Cunxu at Yedu (鄴都, in modern Handan), Zhao Zaili (趙在禮), had wanted to accept Li Siyuan's subsequent commission as military governor (Jiedushi) of Yicheng Circuit (義成, headquartered in modern Anyang, Henan), but was coerced by the Yedu troops into not accepting it. However, he sent secret messengers to Li Siyuan, again requesting to be moved. In spring 927, Li Siyuan thus commissioned his own son Li Congrong as the defender of Yedu and had Fan command troops to escort him to Yedu, while commissioning Zhao Zaili as the military governor of Henghai Circuit (橫海, headquartered in modern Cangzhou, Hebei) and two of the main rebel officers under him, Huangfu Hui (皇甫暉) and Zhao Jin (趙進) as prefectural prefects elsewhere. Apparently in fear of the troops that Fan and Li Congrong had with them, the Yedu troops did not dare to resist. Upon Fan's arrival, nine corps of Yedu troops were dispatched to Lutai Base (蘆臺軍, in modern Cangzhou) to defend against a possible Khitan incursion, but mutinied once they reached there and killed the commander of the base, Wu Zhen (烏震). During the mutiny (which was induced by the general Fang Zhiwen (房知溫), who however subsequently suppressed it with An Shentong (安審通)), Fan requisitioned Yicheng troops to help defend a potential mutineer return to Yedu.

Fan appeared to have then returned to Luoyang to again serve as a director of palace affairs, for that was the office he was described as having in winter 927. At that time, Li Siyuan publicly declared that he was going from Luoyang to Bian Prefecture (汴州, i.e., Daliang), and there were rumors that he was either intending to attack Later Tang's southeastern neighbor Wu, or to strike at one of the military governors in the east that he suspected the loyalty of. In fear, Zhu Shouyin the military governor of Xuanwu Circuit (宣武, headquartered at Bian Prefecture) decided to resist his arrival, and put up defenses to do so. Li Siyuan was initially sending Fan to try to see if he could persuade Zhu not to resist, but Fan believed that he needed to attack the Bian defenses quickly so that the defenses could not be solidified, and so, at his request, he was given 500 soldiers to accompany him. When he arrived at Bian, he launched an attack with his limited number of troops, surprising the Bian defenders. When Li Siyuan's son-in-law Shi Jingtang subsequently also arrived with reinforcements, followed by Li Siyuan himself, the Bian defenders began surrendering in droves. Zhu, finding the situation hopeless, killed his family and then committed suicide.

In 928, Fan was made one of Li Siyuan's chiefs of staff (Shumishi). He was soon thereafter made the military governor of Chengde Circuit (成德, headquartered in modern Shijiazhuang, Hebei). He was also given the honorary title of acting Taibao (太保). He was apparently subsequently recalled to the imperial government, for, as of fall 930, he was referred to as the former military governor of Chengde without being referred to by other titles. At that time, Li Siyuan was considering replacing then-chief of staff An Chonghui (who was the most dominating figure at court for Li Siyuan's entire reign up to that point) due to accusations that An was overly domineering of the political scene. Fan urged against removing An, and when Li Siyuan responded, "Can you not do so?" Fan responded, "I, your subject, have not served you as long, and I am not as talented as An Chonghui. How would I dare replace him?" Li Siyuan subsequently kept An as chief of staff, but also made Fan a chief of staff, serving with An. After An was finally removed (and subsequently killed) in 931, Zhao Yanshou, also a son-in-law of Li Siyuan's, took over as the other chief of staff, serving with Fan. Nevertheless, it was said that because An had suffered his fate due to his domination of the political scene, neither Fan nor Zhao dared to overly involve themselves with policy decisions, such that the eunuch Meng Hanqiong (who took over as the director of palace affairs), and Li Siyuan's favorite concubine Consort Wang, became highly influential in policy decisions. In fall 931, Fan was given the designation Tong Zhongshu Menxia Pingzhangshi (同中書門下平章事), thus also designating him as a chancellor.

In 932, it was said that it was at Fan's urging that Li Siyuan sent the generals Yao Yanchou (藥彥稠) and Kang Fu (康福) against Dangxiang tribesmen, to try to stop them from pillaging against imperial messengers and foreign ambassadors in the region between Ling (靈州, in modern Yinchuan, Ningxia) and Bin (邠州, in modern Xianyang, Shaanxi) Prefectures. Yao and Kang were said to be successful in their mission in defeating and capturing Dangxiang tribesmen, although the long-term maintenance of peace in the region was not mentioned. Also in 932, Dong Zhang the military governor of Dongchuan Circuit (東川, headquartered in modern Mianyang, Sichuan) was attacking Meng Zhixiang the military governor of Xichuan Circuit (西川, headquartered in modern Chengdu, Sichuan). (Both Dong and Meng were by that point de facto independent from the imperial government, although Dong was in a confrontational posture with the imperial government while Meng was more conciliatory.) Fan advocated trying to take advantage of Dong's attack to try to recapture both circuits. However, when Meng quickly defeated Dong thereafter, Fan changed his recommendation and recommended taking a conciliatory posture with Meng, which Li Siyuan accepted. Subsequently, Meng became nominally submissive to the imperial government again.

By late 932, it was said that Li Congrong, as Li Siyuan's oldest son and presumed heir, as well as the Prince of Qin, as well as the commander of the imperial guards, was becoming very dominant at court, and used that domination to bully the imperial officials. Shi (who was then the deputy to Li Congrong as the deputy commander of the imperial guards), Zhao, and Fan were all wanting to leave the imperial court to avoid confrontations with Li Congrong, but Li Siyuan would not allow them to leave. However, when Khitan apparently was preparing an incursion, Li Siyuan, at Fan's and Zhao's recommendation that the only appropriate commanders would be Shi or Kang Yicheng (康義誠), relented at least as to Shi, making Shi the military governor of Hedong Circuit (河東, headquartered in modern Taiyuan, Shanxi), to defend against the Khitan.

Despite Li Congrong's honored status, Li Siyuan did not want to name him Crown Prince, believing that if he had a crown prince, it would effectively be a sign that he was old and should be retiring. When the official He Ze (何澤), trying to ingratiate Li Congrong, nevertheless suggested it in summer 933, Li Siyuan was saddened, but nevertheless felt compelled to have the matter discussed with the chancellors and chiefs of staff. Li Congrong, however, thought that it was Fan and Zhao who drove the proposal, and was not happy himself with it, both because he knew it displeased his father and because he saw as an attempt to have him confined to the crown prince's palace and unable to command troops. Fan and Zhao, knowing that both Li Siyuan and Li Congrong were displeased, moved to withdraw the proposal, and further to have Li Congrong named the commander of all armed forces. Shortly after, Fan and Zhao were both given the greater chancellor designation Shizhong (侍中, head of the examination bureau of government (門下省, Menxia Sheng)).

Despite this, Fan and Zhao were continuing to be fearful of Li Congrong, who was privately threatening to act against them once he was in power. They continued to try to resign, but this drew Li Siyuan's anger, believing that they were trying to abandon him. Finally, at the urging of Zhao's wife the Princess Qi, Li Siyuan agreed to let one of them leave—and made Zhao the military governor of Xuanwu Circuit and replacing him with Zhu Hongzhao. Subsequently, in winter 933, Fan was also allowed to resign, and was made the military governor of Chengde; he was replaced by Feng Yun. (Only as Li Siyuan was sending him off did Fan dare to bring up the fact that Meng Hanqiong was being too dominant in the palace, but even then he only did so circumspectly).

Not long after Fan's departure, Li Siyuan fell seriously ill. Li Congrong, believing that Li Siyuan's associates, including Zhu and Feng, might try to divert the succession away from him, tried to seize the throne by force, but was defeated and killed. Li Siyuan thereafter summoned Li Congrong's younger brother Li Conghou the Prince of Song, who was then the military governor of Tianxiong Circuit (天雄, headquartered at Yedu), from there, and left Meng temporary in charge of Tianxiong. When Li Siyuan died shortly after, Li Conghou became emperor.

== During Li Conghou's and Li Congke's reigns ==
It was said that Zhu Hongzhao and Feng Yun, then the dominant figures at court, did not want Shi Jingtang to stay long at Hedong, and also wanted to recall Meng Hanqiong back to the imperial government. In spring 934, without officially having Li Conghou issue edicts to those effects, issued a series of transfer orders—transferring Fan Yanguang from Chengde to Tianxiong; transferring Li Conghou's adoptive brother Li Congke the Prince of Lu from Fengxiang Circuit (鳳翔, headquartered in modern Baoji, Shaanxi) to Hedong; and transferring Shi from Hedong to Chengde. While Fan's reaction to these transfers was not clearly stated in history, Li Congke suspected that this series of orders were targeted toward him, and therefore rebelled. The imperial forces sent against him, commanded by the general Wang Sitong, was initially successful against Li Congke, but during the siege of Fengxiang, a group of soldiers turned against Wang and submitted to Li Congke, leading to a collapse of the imperial army in general. Li Conghou fled, but was eventually killed in flight. Li Congke took the throne. Shortly after taking the throne, Li Congke recalled Fan from Tianxiong to again serve as chief of staff. In spring 935, however, he sent Fan back out to serve as the military governor of Xuanwu, also giving him the greater honorary chancellor title of Zhongshu Ling (中書令).

In the aftermaths of Li Conghou's death, Li Congke returned Shi to Hedong. However, they had long had a rivalry, and the rivalry led to suspicion between them. Shi repeatedly tried to test Li Congke by offering to yield Hedong in favor of a smaller circuit. In 936, Li Congke decided to agree, and issued an edict transferring Shi to Tianping. Shi immediately rebelled. Shortly after, the Tianxiong officer Zhang Lingzhao (張令昭) also mutinied against Tianxiong's military governor Liu Yanhao (a brother of Li Congke's wife Empress Liu) and seized the circuit. Li Congke commissioned Fan as the military governor of Tianxiong and the commander of the forces against Zhang, with Li Zhou (李周) serving as his deputy. Fan quickly defeated and killed Zhang, ending that rebellion.

The rebellion by Shi, however, was much stronger and difficult to defeat. Moreover, Shi resolved to seek Khitan aid, offering to cede to Khitan's Emperor Taizong (Yelü Deguang) 16 prefectures on Later Tang's northern borders (in effect, Lulong Circuit (盧龍, headquartered in modern Beijing) and other prefectures north of Yanmen Pass) if Emperor Taizong would help him overthrow Li Congke. Emperor Taizong agreed, and went to aid Shi, while the general commissioned by Li Congke to attack Shi, Zhang Jingda, put Hedong's capital Taiyuan under siege. Once Emperor Taizong arrived at Taiyuan, the joint Khitan/Hedong forces defeated Zhang, and subsequently had Zhang's forces surrounded at Jin'an Base (晉安寨, in modern Taiyuan). The news of Zhang's defeat and envelopment greatly troubled Li Congke, and he ordered Fan, Zhao Dejun the military governor of Lulong, and Pan Huan (潘環) the defender of Yao Prefecture (耀州, in modern Tongchuan, Shaanxi), to all launch troops toward Jin'an to aid Zhang. Fan therefore took his army and advanced to Liao Prefecture (遼州, in modern Jinzhong, Shanxi). Zhao, however, had other ideas—he wanted to take over other armies to join his own, so that he could then use the joint armies as his own, and therefore, instead of directly heading toward Jin'an, he advanced south, requisitioning troops of Yiwu (義武, headquartered in modern Baoding, Hebei), Chengde, and Zhaoyi (昭義, headquartered in modern Changzhi, Shanxi) Circuits and merging them into his own army, before also requesting to rendezvous with Fan's army. Fan, however, was suspicious of Zhao's intentions, and refused the overture, claiming that his army was deep in enemy territory already and could not rendezvous with Zhao's, preventing his army from being merged into Zhao's. Zhao thereafter advanced to Tuanbo Gorge (團柏谷, in modern Jinzhong), but stopped there, not advancing further toward Jin'an, while engaging in secret negotiations with Emperor Taizong, hoping that Emperor Taizong would support him, instead of Shi, in overthrowing Li Congke. Emperor Taizong was tempted, but eventually turned down Zhao's overture. To further affirm his support of Shi, he created Shi emperor of China, founding a new Later Jin.

With Zhao not heading to aid the Later Tang imperial army at Jin'an, Zhang was killed by his deputy Yang Guangyuan, who then surrendered to the joint Khitan/Later Jin forces. The Khitan/Later Jin forces then attacked Zhao, defeating him and forcing him to surrender as well. Li Congke, who had by that point departed Luoyang and was at Huai Prefecture (懷州, in modern Jiaozuo, Henan), received this news, and considered heading to Tianxiong to rendezvous with Fan, but soon gave up the idea and returned to Luoyang. Once back at Luoyang, however, he saw that his own army generals were surrendering to the new Later Jin emperor in droves. Finding the situation hopeless, he gathered his family, ascended a tower in the palace, and committed suicide by burning the tower, ending Later Tang. Shi thereafter entered Luoyang and took over Later Tang territory.

== During Shi Jingtang's reign ==
After Zhao Dejun's defeat, Fan Yanguang returned from Liao Prefecture to Yedu, and sent a petition to Shi Jingtang, submitting to him as a subject. However, he continued to be uncomfortable with the situation because he had resisted Shi and because he was friendly with Li Congke, with his daughter having married Li Congke's son Li Chongmei Prince of Yong, who had committed suicide along with Li Congke. He sent a secret letter to Mi Qiong (祕瓊), who had taken over Chengde Circuit after Chengde's military governor Dong Wenqi (董溫琪) had, at Zhao's invitation, joined Zhao's army and was then detained by Khitan along with Zhao, by slaughtering Dong's family and seizing Dong's considerable wealth. Shi subsequently refused to let Mi stay at Chengde, but gave him another post, as the defender of Qi Prefecture (齊州, in modern Jinan, Shandong). Mi decided to carry his wealth (originally seized from Dong's family) with him. Fan, wanting to silence him and seize his wealth, sent soldiers and surprised Mi on the way, killing him and seizing his wealth, while claiming to Shi that the killing was accidental. Shi chose not to react to Mi's killing.

Meanwhile, Fan was also enticed by the fact that when he was still a common citizen, one fortuneteller named Zhang had predicted that he would become general and chancellor, and then once he reached those positions, Zhang visited him again and, when interpreting a dream that Fan had where a snake entered his navel, predicted that because snakes and dragons were of the same kind, it was a sign of enthronement. He decided to gather his troops, and he summoned all the prefects of the prefectures within Tianxiong, preparing to rebel. In reaction, Shi decided to move the capital from Luoyang to Daliang, which was closer to Yedu, to prepare for the eventuality of Fan's rebellion, but also created Fan the Prince of Linqing to try to assuage him.

Fan's subordinates Sun Rui (孫銳) and Feng Hui (馮暉), however, continued to press him to rebel, and Fan, continuing to be enticed by what fortuneteller Zhang said, agreed. He launched his troops in summer 937 and headed toward the Yellow River ford at Liyang (黎陽, in modern Hebi, Henan), with Sun and Feng serving as his commanders. Shi's general Zhang Congbin (張從賓) joined Fan's rebellion, killing Shi's son Shi Chongxin (石重信) the military governor of Heyang Circuit (河陽, headquartered in modern Luoyang) and Shi Chong'ai (石重乂) the defender of Luoyang, taking over both Heyang Circuit and Luoyang itself. A number of former aristocrats who had lost power under Shi's new regime also joined the rebellion. However, as Fan's army was crossing the Yellow River, Yang Guangyuan attacked Sun and Feng, crushing Fan's army, which he then was forced to withdraw to Yedu. Shi's other generals Du Chongwei and Hou Yi (侯益) then defeated and killed Zhang Congbin, quelling that part of the rebellion.

Believing the situation to be hopeless, Fan blamed the rebellion on Sun and slaughtered him and his family, and submitted a petition to surrender to Yang. Yang relayed it to Shi, but Shi initially rejected it. However, a subsequent siege of Yedu by Later Jin forces dragged on to fall 938 and wore out the Later Jin forces. Shi decided to allow Fan to surrender, and he sent his associate Zhu Xian (朱憲) to meet Fan, promising to transfer Fan to another large circuit and swearing to the sun that if Fan surrendered and was killed anyway, his own state would not last. Fan agreed, sending his sons Fan Shoutu (范守圖) and Fan Shouying (范守英) to Daliang to serve as hostages, and then opened the city and surrendered. Shi commissioned Fan as the military governor of Tianping and bestowed on him an iron certificate, promising to pardon a future death sentence. He was also created the Prince of Dongping. In winter 938, however, he went to Daliang to pay homage to Shi and repeatedly asked to retire. Shi allowed him to retire as a senior advisor to the Crown Prince (a completely honorary post as there was no crown prince at the time) and kept him at Daliang, while treating him no differently from any other senior official.

In fall 940, Fan asked to retire to his mansion at Heyang, and Shi agreed. Fan carried the treasures that he had accumulated through the years with him. Yang Guangyuan, who was then Luoyang's defender as well as Heyang's military governor, repeatedly submitted petitions to have Fan killed, as he coveted Fan's treasures and also feared that Fan would create problems for him. Shi refused, but when Yang subsequently requested to have Fan moved to Luoyang, Shi agreed. Shortly after, Yang had his son Yang Chenggui (楊承貴) take soldiers and surround Fan's mansion, trying to force him to suicide. Fan, citing Shi's promise to him, refused. Yang Chenggui then forced Fan to march to the Yellow River, and then had him pushed into the river to drown, while Yang Guangyuan submitted a report claiming that Fan committed suicide. While it was said that Shi did not dare to pursue the matter because of Yang's military strength, he posthumously honored Fan. (However, even at the time it was believed that this fit within what Shi wanted.)

== Notes and references ==
- History of the Five Dynasties, vol. 97.
- New History of the Five Dynasties, vol. 51.
- Zizhi Tongjian, vols. 272, 275, 276, 277, 278, 279, 280, 281, 282.
