= Zhang Yanlang =

Zhang Yanlang (Chinese: 張延朗) (died January 14, 937?) was an official of the Chinese Five Dynasties and Ten Kingdoms Period states Later Liang and Later Tang. He had his most powerful positions during the reign of Later Tang's last emperor Li Congke, as both chancellor and the director of the three financial agencies (taxation, treasury, and salt and iron monopolies). After Li Congke was overthrown by his brother-in-law Shi Jingtang, who established his own Later Jin, Shi ordered Zhang be put to death.

== Background and service during Later Liang ==
It is not known when Zhang Yanlang was born, but it is known that he was from Kaifeng. During Later Liang, he served as an administrator under the director of material pricing, later becoming the material pricing adjustor at Yun Prefecture (鄆州, in modern Tai'an, Shandong).

== During Later Tang ==
=== During Li Cunxu's reign ===
In 923, Li Siyuan, a major general for Later Liang's archrival Later Tang, which was then ruled by Li Siyuan's adoptive brother Li Cunxu, captured Yun Prefecture in a surprise attack, and was subsequently commissioned by Li Cunxu as the military governor (Jiedushi) of Tianping Circuit (天平, headquartered at Yun). Zhang Yanlang came under his command, and he had Zhang continue to serve as the material pricing adjustor. Later (after Later Tang destroyed Later Liang later in 923), when as Li Suyuan was moved to Xuanwu Circuit (宣武, headquartered at Kaifeng) (in 924) and later Chengde Circuit (成德, headquartered in modern Shijiazhuang, Hebei) (in 925), Zhang followed him to those assignments and served as the circuit treasurer. At some point, Zhang fostered his relationship with Li Siyuan's chief strategist An Chonghui by giving a daughter in marriage to An's son.

=== During Li Siyuan's reign ===
In 926, Li Cunxu was killed in a mutiny at the capital Luoyang. Li Siyuan claimed the throne thereafter. He made An Chonghui his chief of staff, and An, on account of the marital relationship between his son and Zhang Yanlang's daughter, had Zhang made the deputy chief of staff.

Meanwhile, Li Siyuan had executed Li Cunxu's director of material pricing, Kong Qian, under the rationale that Kong's harsh taxes had driven the people against Li Cunxu. The directorate of material pricing — which Later Liang had established to replace Tang's three financial agencies (taxation, treasury, and salt and iron monopolies) and merge them into one — was abolished. Rather, the three agencies were reestablished, at least in name, as separate agencies, and typically placed under the command of a chancellor. In 927, Zhang, who was then also carrying the title of director of palace affairs (宣徽使, Xuanhuishi), was made the acting director of the three agencies, but continued to also serve as the director of palace affairs. He was also apparently, at the same time, serving as the military governor of Zhongwu Circuit (忠武, headquartered in modern Xuchang, Henan). In 928, when Li Siyuan was preparing to launch a general campaign against the warlord Wang Du, the military governor of Yiwu, after Wang Du had tried—but failed—to assassinate the imperial general Wang Yanqiu, it was Zhang that Li Siyuan sent to the front to consult with Wang Yanqiu and the other generals stationed nearby to determine the strategy. Later, when the Khitan Empire sent an army to try to aid Wang Du, Zhang and Wang Yanqiu both commanded armies in defeating the joint Yiwu and Khitan army.

In 930, Zhang Yanlang was given the titles of acting minister of public works (工部尚書, Gongbu Shangshu) and director of the three agencies (三司使, Sansishi). This was the first time that anyone was given the title of Sansishi. (He was later, though, made the military governor of Taining Circuit (泰寧, headquartered in modern Jining, Shandong), and then of Xiongwu Circuit (雄武, headquartered in modern Tianshui, Gansu), although it was unclear whether these assignments were made during or after Li Siyuan's reign.)

=== During Li Congke's reign ===
In 934 — by which time Li Siyuan's adoptive son Li Congke was emperor — Zhang Yanlang was serving as the military governor of Xiongwu. That year, the commander of the army at Wen Prefecture (文州, in modern Longnan, Gansu), Cheng Yangui (成延龜), surrendered the prefecture to Later Shu. Zhang launched his army and put Wen Prefecture under siege. When the Later Shu general Li Yanhou (李延厚) sent a relief force, however, Zhang lifted the siege and withdrew, allowing Later Shu to retain Wen. Shortly after, Li Congke recalled him from Xiongwu, made him Zhongshu Shilang (中書侍郎, the deputy head of the legislative bureau of government (中書省, Zhongshu Sheng)), and made him a chancellor with the designation Tong Zhongshu Menxia Pingzhangshi (同中書門下平章事), as well as acting director of the three financial agencies.

In early 936, Li Congke, concerned that his brother-in-law (the husband of Li Siyuan's biological daughter the Princess of Jin), Shi Jingtang the military governor of Hedong Circuit (河東, headquartered in modern Taiyuan, Shanxi), would rebel, consulted a number of imperial officials on what to do to ward off a Hedong rebellion. Lü Qi (呂琦) advocated entering into an alliance with the Khitan by submitting a large financial gift to the Khitan. Zhang was very supportive of Lü's proposal, believing that not only would it ward off a Hedong rebellion, but it would create great savings in border defenses. He and Lü therefore drafted a proposed communique to the Khitan. However, when Li Congke consulted the imperial scholar Xue Wenyu (薛文遇), Xue not only opposed, but persuaded Li Congke that it would be humiliating, particularly because the Khitan Emperor Taizong may insist on marrying Li Congke's daughter (or have a Khitan prince do so) under the Heqin system. Li Congke thus rejected the proposal. Meanwhile, over the years he served as Li Congke's acting director of the three agencies, Zhang, apprehensive of a possible Hedong rebellion, tried to reduce the amount of revenues Shi had access to by strictly examining the tax revenues from Hedong, allowing the circuit to retain only the amount of revenues it was entitled to keep legally and requiring it to submit all other tax revenue to the imperial government, drawing Shi's resentment.

Later in the year, when Li Congke tried to test Shi's loyalty by transferring him to Tianping, Shi rebelled and, with a Khitan force commanded by Emperor Taizong himself aiding him, defeated the Later Tang force Li Congke sent against him, commanded by Zhang Jingda. The remnants of Zhang Jingda's army was surrounded by the Hedong/Khitan forces at Jin'an Base (晉安寨, near Taiyuan). Upon Zhang Jingda's defeat, Li Congke's young son Li Chongmei the Prince of Yong volunteered to command another Later Tang army against the combined Hedong/Khitan forces, and initially Li Congke was inclined to agree. However, Zhang Yanlang, Liu Yanlang (劉延朗), and Li Congke's brother-in-law Liu Yanhao (brother of Li Congke's wife Empress Liu), all advocated that Li Congke himself command the army, despite Li Congke's own lack of desire to do so. Li Congke felt compelled to do so. Zhang, not trusting Li Congke's chief of staff Zhao Yanshou, also had Zhao removed from the scene by supporting fellow chancellor Lu Wenji's proposal to have Li Congke send Zhao north to rendezvous with Zhao's father Zhao Dejun the military governor of Lulong Circuit (盧龍, headquartered in modern Beijing) to jointly face the Hedong/Khitan army, and Li Congke did so. Meanwhile, also under Zhang Yanlang's suggestion, Li Congke issued a general conscription order, requiring a collection of the people's horses, as well as the requirement to have one man enter the military for every seven households. The result of the conscription order only yielded 5,000 soldiers and 2,000 horses, creating no real help for the imperial army but causing the people much alarm.

Subsequently, Zhang Jingda's army, which was then facing starvation, surrendered after Zhang Jingda's deputy Yang Guangyuan killed him. The Later Jin/Khitan army (Shi having been created the emperor of a new Later Jin by Emperor Taizong by this point) also defeated Zhao Dejun and Zhao Yanshou's army, and was heading for Luoyang. Li Congke, believing the situation to be hopeless, committed suicide with his family by fire, ending Later Tang. Shi subsequently entered Luoyang.

== Death ==
Shi Jingtang summoned the Later Tang officials to an imperial gathering. At the gathering, he declared a general pardon for all present — except for Zhang Yanlang, whom he arrested and put into jail. He subsequently issued an edict, reaffirming the pardon, but excepting Zhang, Liu Yanlang, and Liu Yanhao from the pardon. Zhang was then executed. It was said, though, that later when Shi was trying to find a suitable person to head the three financial agencies but could not find one, he regretted killing Zhang.

== Notes and references ==
- History of the Five Dynasties, vol. 69.
- New History of the Five Dynasties, vol. 26.
- Zizhi Tongjian, vols. 275, 276, 277, 279, 280.
