= Empress Liu (Li Congke's wife) =

Empress Liu (劉皇后, personal name unknown) (died January 11, 937), was an empress of the Chinese Five Dynasties and Ten Kingdoms Period state Later Tang. Her husband was Later Tang's last emperor Li Congke.

== Background ==
It is not known when Lady Liu was born, but it is known that she was from Ying Prefecture (應州, in modern Shuozhou, Shanxi). Her father's name was given as Liu Maowei (劉茂威) in her biography in the New History of the Five Dynasties, and she had a younger brother named Liu Yanhao, whose biography in the Old History of the Five Dynasties gave their father's name as Liu Maocheng (劉茂成). It is not known when she married Li Congke. She was said to be strong and fierce in her personality, such that Li Congke was fearful of her. His eldest known son Li Chongji (李重吉) was born of her; but it was not known whether his another known son Li Chongmei, or his daughter Li Huiming (李惠明) or another unnamed daughter, were born of her. During the reign of Li Congke's adoptive father Li Siyuan, she carried the title of Lady of Pei.

== As empress ==
In 934, Li Congke overthrew his younger adoptive brother Li Conghou and became emperor. Later in the year, he created Lady Liu empress.

In summer 936, Liu Yanhao, who was then the military governor (Jiedushi) of Tianxiong Circuit (天雄, headquartered in modern Handan, Hebei) and who had alienated his soldiers by being arrogant, by improperly seizing properties, and by decreasing his bestowments on soldiers, was expelled from Tianxiong by his mutineering officer Zhang Lingzhao (張令昭). Li Congke had to put down the rebellion by commissioning the more senior general Fan Yanguang as the military governor of Tianxiong and having Fan destroy the mutineers. When Liu Yanhao reached the capital Luoyang, Li Congke, in anger, considered exiling him, but with Empress Liu interceding for him, he was merely removed from his offices and returned to his mansion.

By that time, Li Congke was facing the rebellion of his brother-in-law Shi Jingtang the military governor of Hedong Circuit (河東, headquartered in modern Taiyuan, Shanxi), who, with the support of Later Tang's northern rival Khitan Empire, declared himself emperor of a new state of Later Jin. The situation turned against Later Tang late in the year, as the combined Khitan/Later Jin forces had crushed the forces Li Congke sent against Shi. Around the new year 937, Shi was approaching Luoyang, and the Later Tang generals were submitting to him in droves. Li Congke gathered his family members and a number of officers still loyal to him and prepared to commit suicide by fire at Xuanwu Tower (玄武樓). Empress Liu, however, also planned to burn down the entire palace complex. Li Chongmei persuaded her not to, stating to her, "The new Son of Heaven surely cannot sleep under open air. He would only, at a future time, expend the energy of the people to rebuild. How is it that we should die and leave the people to hate us?" Shortly after, Li Congke's family, including Empress Liu and Li Chongmei, committed suicide by fire.

== Notes and references ==
- Old History of the Five Dynasties, vol. 49.
- New History of the Five Dynasties, vol. 16.
- Zizhi Tongjian, vols. 279, 280.

Preceded by Empress Kong	Empress of Later Tang; 934–937	Succeeded by None (dynasty destroyed)
Preceded by Empress Kong	Empress of China (Central); 934–936	Succeeded by Empress Li of Later Jin
Preceded by Empress Kong	Empress of China (Beijing/Tianjin/Northern Hebei/Northern Shanxi); 934–937	Succeeded by Empress Xiao Sagezhi and Empress Zhen of Liao Dynasty
Preceded by Empress Kong	Wife to Sovereign of China (Zhejiang); 934–937	Succeeded by Lady Ma of Wuyue
