= Liu Yanhao =

Liu Yanhao (Chinese: 劉延皓) (died 937) was an official and general of the Chinese Five Dynasties and Ten Kingdoms Period state Later Tang, serving briefly as the chief of staff (Shumishi) for its last emperor and his brother-in-law Li Congke.

== Background ==
It is not known when Liu Yanhao was born, but it is known that he was from Ying Prefecture (應州, in modern Shuozhou, Shanxi). His grandfather Liu Jianli (劉建立) and father Liu Maocheng (劉茂成) both had accomplishments as army officers. (The biography of his older sister Lady Liu, who married Li Congke at some point, in the New History of the Five Dynasties, gave their father's name as Liu Maowei (劉茂威).) When Li Congke was commissioned the military governor (Jiedushi) of Fengxiang Circuit (鳳翔, headquartered in modern Baoji, Shaanxi) by his adoptive father, then-emperor Li Siyuan, in 932, he had Liu Yanhao made an officer at Fengxiang. Liu Yanhao, while serving under Li Congke at Fengxiang, developed a reputation for being kind and tolerant.

== During Li Congke's reign ==
In 934, Li Congke overthrew then-emperor Li Conghou (his adoptive brother and Li Siyuan's biological son) and became emperor. He created Liu Yanhao's sister Lady Liu empress. Because of his status as the empress' brother, as well as his reputation for being kind and tolerant, Li Congke initially commissioned Liu Yanhao as the director of palace grounds (宮苑使, Gongyuanshi), and then the more important office of director of palace affairs (宣徽使, Xuanhuishi). In 935, he commissioned Liu as the minister of justice (刑部尚書, Xingbu Shangshu) and chief of staff. Shortly after, he commissioned Liu as the military governor of Tianxiong Circuit (天雄, headquartered in modern Handan, Hebei).

It was said that, after Liu took over the Tianxiong command, his disposition changed. He seized many people's properties and spent much time in feasts. He also did not regularly provide salaries to his soldiers, leading to much resentment from them. In summer 936, by which time Li Congke's brother-in-law Shi Jingtang (the husband of Li Siyuan's daughter Princess of Jin) the military governor of Hedong Circuit (河東, headquartered in modern Taiyuan, Shanxi) had rebelled against Li Congke, Liu's officer Zhang Lingzhao (張令昭), seeing the soldiers' resentment, led a mutiny against him, intending to seize Tianxiong and join the Hedong rebellion. Liu fled to the capital Luoyang. Li Congke, in anger, wanted to exile him. However, with Empress Liu interceding for him, Li Congke only removed him from his posts and ordered him back to his mansion. (Zhang's mutiny was later suppressed by Fan Yanguang.) However, he did not appear to completely fall out of favor with Li Congke, as later in the year, after the general Zhang Jingda, whom Li Congke had initially sent against Shi, was defeated by the joint forces of Shi and his backer, Emperor Taizong of Later Tang's northern rival Khitan Empire, Liu, along with Zhang Yanlang and Liu Yanlang (劉延朗), were said to be proponents of Li Congke personally leading an army against Shi.

== Death ==
However, after another general Li Congke had sent, Zhao Dejun, was also defeated by the joint Khitan/Hedong forces, the morale in Li Congke's own army collapsed. Li Congke, finding the situation hopeless, returned to Luoyang, and committed suicide by fire with his family, including Liu Yanhao's sister Empress Liu. Liu Yanhao initially hid. However, after Shi (who had declared himself emperor of a new state of Later Jin) entered Luoyang, Shi issued an edict that largely pardoned Li Congke's subjects, but condemning Zhang Yanlang, Liu Yanlang, and Liu Yanhao. Liu Yanhao, apparently finding it impossible to continue his hiding, committed suicide by hanging several days later.

== Notes and references ==
- Old History of the Five Dynasties, vol. 69.
- Zizhi Tongjian, vols. 279, 280.
