= Zhang Jingda =

Zhang Jingda (張敬達; died December 25, 936), courtesy name Zhitong (志通), nickname Shengtie (生鐵, "raw iron"), was a Chinese military general and politician of the Five Dynasties and Ten Kingdoms period Later Tang state. At the end of Later Tang, when Shi Jingtang rebelled against Later Tang's last emperor Li Congke, Zhang commanded the Later Tang army against Shi, but was defeated by the joint forces of Shi and Emperor Taizong of Liao. His deputy Yang Guangyuan then killed him and surrendered, leading to Later Tang's fall.

== Background and service under Li Cunxu ==
It is not known when Zhang Jingda was born, but it is known that his family was from Dai Prefecture (代州, in modern Xinzhou, Shanxi). His father Zhang Shen (張審) was known to be a ferocious warrior, and served as an officer under the major late-Tang dynasty warlord Li Keyong the military governor of Hedong Circuit (河東, headquartered in modern Taiyuan, Shanxi), who carried the title of Prince of Jin. After Li Keyong's death — by which time Tang had fallen and Li Keyong ruled his own state of Jin — Zhang Shen continued to serve under Li Keyong's son and successor Li Cunxu.

In 923, Li Cunxu declared himself the emperor of a new Later Tang. Shortly after, Zhang Shen died, while still serving in the army — possibly in battle. By that point, Zhang Jingda was already known for his riding and archery skills. Li Cunxu heard this, and summoned him, giving him his father's old position. After Li Cunxu subsequently successfully destroyed archrival Later Liang and took over its territory, Zhang Jingda was given an honorary minister title.

== Service under Li Siyuan ==
Li Cunxu was killed in a mutiny at the capital Luoyang in 926, and Li Cunxu's adoptive brother Li Siyuan became emperor. Zhang Jingda continued to serve in the imperial army. In the middle of Li Siyuan's Changxing era (930-933), Zhang became the commander of the cavalry and infantry soldiers at Hedong and was given the honorary title of acting Situ (司徒), as well as the prefect of Qin Prefecture (欽州, in modern Qinzhou, Guangxi) — an honorary post as well, as Qin was then under the rule of Southern Han. In 932, he was made the military governor (Jiedushi) of Zhangguo Circuit (彰國, headquartered in modern Shuozhou, Shanxi), and given the honorary title of acting Taibao. In 933, he was made the military governor of Datong Circuit (大同, headquartered in modern Datong, Shanxi). At that time, it was frequent that the tribal forces of the Khitan Empire would send herds into Later Tang territory to graze. Zhang put sufficient garrisons on the border such that the Khitan did not dare to enter Datong territory, and it was said that the people in the border regions relied on him for protection.

== After Li Siyuan's reign ==
By 935, Li Siyuan's adoptive son Li Congke had become emperor. That year, there was an incident in which his brother-in-law (Li Siyuan's son-in-law) Shi Jingtang, then the military governor of Hedong and who also carried the title of the commander of the armies in the north (i.e., on the Khitan border), was hailed by his soldiers with, "May you live 10,000 years!" (traditionally a hail for the emperor only) while he led his troops at Xin Prefecture (忻州, in modern Xinzhou) in defending against a potential Khitan attack. While Shi executed 36 soldiers who led the hail, it nevertheless caused Li Congke, who had already been previously suspicious of Shi's intentions, to be more concerned. He thus commissioned Zhang Jingda, who was then serving as the military governor of Wuning Circuit (武寧, headquartered in modern Xuzhou, Jiangsu), as the deputy commander of the armies in the north, stationed at Dai, to divide Shi's army. (Either at the same time or thereafter, his own military governorship was transferred from Wuning to Jianxiong Circuit (建雄, headquartered in modern Linfen, Shanxi).

In spring 936, in order to test Li Congke's intentions toward him, Shi requested to be transferred. Believing that Shi would rebel if he transferred Shi but that he could defeat the rebellion, Li Congke issued an edict transferring Shi to Tianping Circuit (天平, headquartered in modern Tai'an, Shandong) and a close associate, Song Shenqian (宋審虔) the military governor of Heyang Circuit (河陽, headquartered in modern Jiaozuo, Henan) to Hedong. He also ordered Zhang to go to Hedong to "escort" Shi from Hedong to Tianping, to put pressure on Shi. Shi thereafter rebelled, issuing a declaration claiming that as Li Congke was an adoptive son, he should not be emperor, and that he should pass the throne to a younger brother, Li Congyi the Prince of Xu (Li Siyuan's youngest biological son). Li Congke, in response, put Zhang in command of an army to attack Hedong, with Yang Guangyuan the military governor of Yiwu Circuit (義武, headquartered in modern Baoding, Hebei) serving as his deputy.

Zhang quickly put Taiyuan under siege, building a wall around it to plan for a lengthy siege. However, by this time, Shi had received promise from Khitan's Emperor Taizong that he would come to Shi's aid in the fall, and Li Congke, hearing of this, ordered Zhang to intensify the siege. Zhang did, but due to weather issues, his offensive bulwarks had difficulty being completed, and while the situation in Hedong's capital Taiyuan was becoming desperate, with food supplies dwindling, the city did not fall. In fall 936, Emperor Taizong arrived with a Khitan army, and quickly engaged the Later Tang army under Zhang. When the two armies engaged, the Khitan feigned weakness and appeared to withdraw, and led the Later Tang forces into a trap where they were cut in two by the subsequent Khitan charge. Half of the army was slaughtered. Zhang took the other half and retreated to Jin'an Base (晉安寨), near Taiyuan. The Khitan/Hedong armies thereafter surrounded his army.

Zhang's army was sieged for several months there, and made several attempts to fight its way out of the encirclement, led by Zhang's subordinates Gao Xingzhou and Fu Yanqing, but was unsuccessful. Its food supplies became drained, and the situation became desperate. Zhang, however, refused to surrender, believing that other Later Tang generals would eventually come to his aid. When Yang and another general, An Shenqi (安審琦), urged him to surrender, he responded:

I have received the deep grace of both Emperor Mingzong [(i.e., Li Siyuan)] and the current emperor. Being the overall commander and suffering defeat are already crimes enough. How can I surrender to the enemy? Relief forces will soon arrive, and we should wait for them. If our energies have been drained such that there was nothing else to do, then other generals could cut off my head and surrender, and it would not be too late to do so.

== Death ==
Yang thereafter tried to get An to join him in assassinating Zhang, but An did not have the heart to do so. Gao became aware that Yang was considering assassinating Zhang, and often tried to stay close to Zhang to protect him, but Zhang did not realize this and in fact became suspicious of Gao's being too close to him, so Gao was forced to distance himself. One morning, when the generals were to meet for briefing, Yang arrived first before the other generals, and proceeded to kill Zhang. He cut off Zhang's head and surrendered the army to Emperor Taizong. Emperor Taizong had long respected Zhang for his reputation and his faithfulness, and he had Zhang buried with honor.

== Notes and references ==
- History of the Five Dynasties, vol. 70.
- New History of the Five Dynasties, vol. 33.
- Zizhi Tongjian, vols. 278, 279, 280.
