= Zhao Dejun =

Zhao Dejun (Chinese: 趙德鈞) (died 937), né Zhao Xingshi (趙行實), known as Li Shaobin (李紹斌) during the reign of Li Cunxu, formally the Prince of Beiping (北平王), was a general of the Chinese Five Dynasties and Ten Kingdoms period state Later Tang (and Later Tang's predecessor state Former Jin). Toward the end of Later Tang, he was ordered by Later Tang's final emperor Li Congke to combat Li Congke's brother-in-law, Shi Jingtang, who had rebelled against Li Congke's reign and established his own Later Jin, as well as Shi's Khitan allies, led by Khitan's Emperor Taizong. However, after failed negotiations in which Zhao himself tried to get Emperor Taizong's support to overthrow Later Tang, the joint Khitan/Later Jin forces defeated him, forcing him to surrender to Khitan. He died in captivity.

== Background ==
It is not known when Zhao Xingshi was born, but it is known that he was from You Prefecture (幽州, in modern Beijing). In his youth, he became a cavalry soldier capable in archery, and he became a soldier under Liu Shouwen the military governor of Yichang Circuit (義昌, headquartered in modern Cangzhou, Hebei). While he was serving under Liu Shouwen during the Kaiping era of Later Liang's emperor Zhu Quanzhong, there was an occasion when Liu Shouwen's army was raiding Xiu County (蓨縣, in modern Hengshui, Hebei). As part of the raid, Zhao captured a child named Liu Yanshou, who was a son of Xiu's county magistrate Liu Yuan (劉邧), as well as Liu Yanshou's mother Lady Zhong. He then adopted Liu Yanshou as his own son.

In 909, Liu Shouwen, who was then in a rivalry with his brother Liu Shouguang after Liu Shouguang had imprisoned their father Liu Rengong and seized Lulong Circuit (盧龍, headquartered at You Prefecture), which Liu Rengong had controlled, was captured by Liu Shouguang and subsequently killed. Zhao came under Liu Shouguang's command and thereafter served at You Prefecture. As Liu Shouguang, who later claimed the title of Emperor of Yan, came under attack by his southwestern neighbor Jin's prince Li Cunxu in 912, Zhao, believing that Liu Shouguang was doomed to defeat, escaped from Yan and surrendered to Jin. Li Cunxu treated Zhao Xingshi well. Indeed, he bestowed on Zhao the imperial clan name of Li, and gave him a new name of Shaobin. Thereafter, he served several successive terms as prefectural prefects under Li Cunxu. Apparently during this time, his son Zhao Yanshou also married a daughter of Li Cunxu's adoptive brother Li Siyuan (the later Princess Xingping).

== During Later Tang ==
=== During Li Cunxu's reign ===
In 923, Li Cunxu declared himself the emperor of a new Later Tang. At that time, Li Shaobin carried the title of commander of the guard corps from Zhending (真定, in modern Baoding, Hebei), serving under Li Cunxu himself. That year, Li Jitao, the son of Li Cunxu's deceased cousin Li Sizhao, surrendered Anyi Circuit (安義, headquartered in modern Changzhi, Shanxi), to Later Liang's then-emperor Zhu Zhen. Li Jitao's subordinate Pei Yue (裴約) the prefect of Ze Prefecture (澤州, in modern Jincheng, Shanxi) refused to follow his betrayal of Later Tang, but was subsequently put under siege at Ze by the Later Liang general Dong Zhang. Pei sought emergency aid from Li Cunxu, who sent Li Shaobin to aid him, with the explicit instructions to make saving Pei the first priority — that the city may be given up if Pei could be saved. However, before Li Shaobin could arrive, the city had already fallen, and Pei was killed.

Later that year, though, in a campaign that Li Shaobin served in, Li Cunxu launched a surprise attack on Later Liang's capital Daliang itself, capturing it. Zhu committed suicide as the city fell, ending Later Liang and allowing Later Tang to take over its territory. After the campaign, Li Shaobin was made the military governor of Henghai Circuit (橫海, headquartered in modern Cangzhou, Hebei). In spring 924, in response to a Khitan incursion, both he and Li Siyuan, as well as Li Siyuan's adoptive son Li Congke, were dispatched to the border. However, despite that, Khitan forces were repeatedly able to pillage supplies that Later Tang sent to Lulong. Perhaps in response, in spring 925, Li Cunxu made Li Shaobin the military governor of Lulong. Further, because while Li Shaobin was considered a capable officer, he had not yet had great battlefield reputation, Li Siyuan, who was a senior general and who was then serving as the commander of both Han and non-Han soldiers of Li Cunxu's own imperial army, was also given the title of military governor of neighboring Chengde Circuit (成德, headquartered at Zhending), to aid by reputation.

=== During Li Siyuan's reign ===
In 926, Li Cunxu was killed in a mutiny at then-capital Luoyang. Li Siyuan, who had earlier himself rebelled against Li Cunxu, quickly arrived at Luoyang and claimed the throne. After Li Siyuan's ascension, Li Shaobin requested (as many other generals whom Li Cunxu had bestowed the imperial Li name on) to have his original surname restored. Li Siyuan agreed to let Li Shaobin reassume the original surname of Zhao, but also gave him a new personal name of Dejun. It was said that because of the marriage between Zhao's son Zhao Yanshou and Li Siyuan's daughter Princess Xingping, that Zhao Dejun became greatly trusted by the new emperor.

In or shortly before 928, as the relationship between the imperial government and the semi-independent warlord Wang Du the military governor of neighboring Yiwu Circuit (義武, headquartered in modern Baoding, Hebei) was deteriorating, Wang sought an alliance with Zhao by requesting a marriage between their children, although there was no indication that Zhao agreed to either a marriage or an alliance. Indeed, when Li Siyuan subsequently declared a general campaign against Wang Du (over Wang Du's failed assassination attempt against the imperial general Wang Yanqiu, who refused his overtures) and Khitan forces entered Later Tang territory to try to aid Wang Du but were crushed by Wang Yanqiu, Zhao intercepted the fleeing Khitan forces and slaughtered most of them while capturing others. He presented the captives to Li Siyuan, who pardoned the officers but slaughtered the soldiers, believing that it would help restore the relationship with Khitan. After Wang Du was eventually defeated, Li Siyuan rewarded both Zhao and Wang Yanqiu by granting them the honorary chancellor designation of Shizhong (侍中). Later, when Khitan repeatedly requested that the officers be returned, it was at the urging of Zhao and Yang Tan (under the rationale that the pardoned Khitan officers would give intelligence information back to their own government if returned to Khitan) that Li Siyuan did not do so.

Regardless of the officially friendly relations, however, the Khitan army still repeatedly pillaged the territory of Lulong Circuit. As You Prefecture relied on the food supplies sent north by the imperial government, from Zhuo Prefecture (涿州, in modern Baoding) north, to You, the Khitan soldiers were accustomed to set up ambushes at Yangou (閻溝, in modern Beijing), on the way between Zhuo and You, to pillage the food supply shipments. Zhao reacted by building a fort at Yangou, establishing it as the seat of Liangxiang County (良鄉), with a garrison, to guard against such ambushes. Zhao also rebuilt an old fort formerly known as Lu County (潞縣) east of You proper, to allow the people to farm in relative safety, and a new fort known as Sanhe County (三河) further east, to allow the food transport to Ji Prefecture (薊州, in modern Tianjin) to proceed in relative safety.

=== During Li Congke's reign ===
Li Siyuan died in 933, and was initially succeeded by his son Li Conghou. In 934, Li Conghou's adoptive brother Li Congke, believing that Li Conghou's senior officials were planning to act against him, rebelled, defeating the imperial army sent against him and becoming the new emperor. In the aftermaths, a mutual suspicion developed between Li Congke and Li Siyuan's son-in-law Shi Jingtang the military governor of Hedong Circuit (河東, headquartered in modern Taiyuan, Shanxi), and it was said that because of frequent Khitan incursions, both Zhao and Shi used the opportunity to claim the need to build up their armies, causing further tension between Li Congke and Shi.

In 936, Li Congke decided to test Shi's loyalty by moving (as Shi requested) him from Hedong to Tianping Circuit (天平, headquartered in modern Tai'an, Shandong). However, upon receiving the order, Shi rebelled. Li Congke commissioned the imperial general Zhang Jingda as the commander of the army against Shi, with Yang Guangyuan (i.e., Yang Tan, whose name had been changed by this point) as his deputy. As part of Later Tang's campaign plans, Zhao and Dong Wenqi (董溫琪) the military governor of Chengde were ordered to intercept Khitan forces that were anticipated to head south to aid Shi, but apparently, Zhao never launched his troops to do so, and the Khitan forces, under the direct command of Khitan's Emperor Taizong, were able to reach Hedong's capital Taiyuan without being intercepted. The joint Khitan/Hedong forces subsequently defeated Zhang's army and then surrounded it at Jin'an Fortress (晉安寨).

Hearing of the siege of Jin'an, Zhao volunteered to lead an army to try to lift the siege. However, it was said that Zhao's actual intent was to gather up as much of an army as possible (by merging in the armies of the nearby circuits) and then use it to negotiate with the Khitan emperor to support him, instead of Shi, as the emperor of China. To that end, instead of directly heading for Jin'an, he took his army south, first going through Yi Prefecture (易州, in modern Baoding), where he rendezvoused with the imperial army garrisoned there, commanded by the imperial general Liu Zaiming (劉在明), and had Liu join his army. He then headed south to Chengde, and had Dong take his Chengde army with him. He then headed southwest to Zhaoyi Circuit (昭義, headquartered in modern Changzhi, Shanxi), where he rendezvoused with Zhao Yanshou (whom Li Congke had sent north to meet him) and took over the soldiers that Li Congke put under Zhao Yanshou's command as well as the Zhaoyi forces. He then sought to rendezvous with Fan Yanguang the military governor of Tianxiong Circuit (天雄, headquartered in modern Handan, Hebei), but Fan, suspicious of Zhao Dejun's intentions, refused, citing the fact that he was already deeply in enemy territory, at Liao Prefecture (遼州, in modern Jinzhong, Shanxi), and could not retreat to meet Zhao. Zhao subsequently advanced toward Jin'an, to Tuanbo Gorge (團柏谷, in modern Jinzhong), but stopped there, not advancing further toward Jin'an, while engaging in secret negotiations with Emperor Taizong, hoping that Emperor Taizong would support him, instead of Shi, in overthrowing Li Congke. Emperor Taizong was tempted, but eventually turned down Zhao's overture. To further affirm his support of Shi, he created Shi emperor of China, founding a new Later Jin. Meanwhile, Zhao Dejun also sought to have Zhao Yanshou made the military governor of Chengde, which Li Congke refused.

Eventually, the Later Tang forces at Jin'an ran out of food and was in a desperate state. Yang assassinated Zhang (who refused to consider surrendering), and then surrendered. Having taken over the Later Tang forces, the joint Khitan/Later Jin forces then headed south, toward Tuanbo. Zhao's army crumbled in fear, and Zhao himself, along with Zhao Yanshou, fled to Zhaoyi's capital Lu Prefecture (潞州) and initially put up defenses there. Shi sent Gao Xingzhou the military governor of Zhaoyi back there to point out to Zhao that Lu's defenses could not hold long, and Zhao thereafter surrendered. Khitan's Emperor Taizong arrested Zhao Dejun and Zhao Yanshou, sending them back to Khitan proper, while continuing south with Shi. Li Congke, finding the situation hopeless, committed suicide with his family, ending Later Tang. Shi's Later Jin state took over the Later Tang territory.

== After capture by Khitan forces ==
Upon arrival at the Khitan court, Zhao Dejun and Zhao Yanshou, in order to show submission, submitted their treasures and land deeds (of their property at You Prefecture) to Emperor Taizong's mother Empress Dowager Shulü Ping. Empress Dowager Shulü pointed out Zhao Dejun's hypocrisy in claiming loyalty to Later Tang yet at the same time wanting to be emperor himself, and then also pointed out that as You had become her territory (as Shi had agreed to cede 16 prefectures, including all of Lulong Circuit) to Khitan, there was nothing for him to offer her. Zhao Dejun could not respond to her rebuke, and became severely distressed thereafter. He died in captivity in 937. After his death, however, Zhao Yanshou would become a trusted advisor for Emperor Taizong.

== Notes and references ==
- History of the Five Dynasties, vol. 98.
- Zizhi Tongjian, vols. 272, 273, 275, 276, 277, 278, 279, 280.
