= Historical Records of the Five Dynasties =

1073 book by Ouyang Xiu

- Title page for Historical Records of the Five Dynasties, English language translation from 2004
- Author: Ouyang Xiu
- Language: Classical Chinese
- Subject: history of the Five Dynasties period
- Publication date: 1073
- Publication place: Song dynasty
- Original text: Historical Records of the Five Dynasties at Chinese Wikisource

Historical Records of the Five Dynasties
- Traditional Chinese: 五代史記
- Simplified Chinese: 五代史记
Transcriptions
Standard Mandarin
- Hanyu Pinyin: Wǔdài Shǐjì
- Wade–Giles: Wu-tai shi-chi
Southern Min
- Hokkien POJ: Ngó-tāi Sú-kì

New History of the Five Dynasties
- Chinese: 新五代史
Transcriptions
Standard Mandarin
- Hanyu Pinyin: Xīn Wǔdài Shǐ
- Wade–Giles: Hsin Wu-tai shih

The Historical Records of the Five Dynasties (Wudai Shiji) is a Chinese history book on the Five Dynasties period (907–960), written by the Song dynasty official Ouyang Xiu in private. (Note: Of the Twenty-Four Histories compiled after the Tang dynasty, this work was the only one compiled as a private project.) It was drafted during Ouyang's exile from 1036 to 1039 but not published until 1073, a year after his death. An abridged English translation by Richard L. Davis was published in 2004. The history book is a typical representative of the use of Spring and Autumn style (春秋笔法).

One of the official Twenty-Four Histories of China, the book is frequently referred to as the New History of the Five Dynasties (Xin Wudai Shi) in order to distinguish it from the Old History of the Five Dynasties which was published in 974. Though both books follow a similar format, Ouyang's book is more concise and markedly more analytical.

== Contents ==
New History of the Five Dynasties covers the Later Liang, Later Tang, Later Jin, Later Han, and Later Zhou dynasties. The book consists of 74 chapters total. It includes biographies, annuals, case studies, family histories, genealogies, and coverage about Chinese tribes. The layout of the work was inspired by the style of Li Yanshou (李延寿) and it pulls content from Xue Juzheng's work. It has been described as being more important than the work that Xue Juzheng created and upon its discovery "Xue Juzheng's earlier history was largely forgotten and nearly lost to the world."

- Chapters 1–3: Basic Annals of Liang (梁本紀)
- Chapters 4–7: Basic Annals of Tang (唐本紀)
- Chapters 8–9: Basic Annals of Jin (晉本紀)
- Chapter 10: Basic Annals of Han (漢本紀)
- Chapters 11–12: Basic Annals of Zhou (周本紀)
- Chapter 13: Biographies of the Royal Families: Liang (梁家人傳)
- Chapter 14: Biographies of the Royal Families: Taizu of Tang (唐太祖家人傳)
- Chapter 15: Biographies of the Royal Families: Mingzong of Tang (唐明宗家人傳)
- Chapter 16: Biographies of the Royal Families: Emperor Fei of Tang (唐廢帝家人傳)
- Chapter 17: Biographies of the Royal Families: Jin (晉家人傳)
- Chapter 18: Biographies of the Royal Families: Han (漢家人傳)
- Chapter 19: Biographies of the Royal Families: Taizu of Zhou (周太祖家人傳)
- Chapter 20: Biographies of the Royal Families: Shizong of Zhou (周世宗家人傳)
- Chapters 21–23: Biographies of Liang Subjects (梁臣傳)
- Chapters 24–28: Biographies of Tang Subjects (唐臣傳)
- Chapter 29: Biographies of Jin Subjects (晉臣傳)
- Chapter 30: Biographies of Han Subjects (漢臣傳)
- Chapter 31: Biographies of Zhou Subjects (周臣傳)
- Chapter 32: Biographies of Martyrs to Virtue (死節傳)
- Chapter 33: Biographies of Martyrs in Service (死事傳)
- Chapter 34: Biographies of Consistent Conduct (一行傳)
- Chapter 35: Biographies of Six Courtiers of Tang (唐六臣傳)
- Chapter 36: Biographies of Righteous Sons (義兒傳)
- Chapter 37: Biographies of Court Musicians and Actors (伶官傳)
- Chapter 38: Biographies of Eunuchs (宦者傳)
- Chapters 39–57: Miscellaneous Biographies (雜傳)
- Chapters 58–59: Treatise on Astronomy (司天考)
- Chapter 60: Treatise on Administrative Geography (職方考)
- Chapter 61: Hereditary House of Wu (吳世家)
- Chapter 62: Hereditary House of Southern Tang (南唐世家)
- Chapter 63: Hereditary House of Former Shu (前蜀世家)
- Chapter 64: Hereditary House of Later Shu (後蜀世家)
- Chapter 65: Hereditary House of Southern Han (南漢世家)
- Chapter 66: Hereditary House of Chu (楚世家)
- Chapter 67: Hereditary House of Wuyue (吳越世家)
- Chapter 68: Hereditary House of Min (閩世家)
- Chapter 69: Hereditary House of Nanping (南平世家)
- Chapter 70: Hereditary House of Eastern Han (東漢世家)
- Chapter 71: Timeline for the Hereditary Houses of the Ten Kingdoms (十國世家年譜)
- Chapters 72–74: Appendixes on the Four Barbarians (四夷附錄)

The book has been partially translated into English:

- Ouyang Xiu (2004) [1077]. Historical Records of the Five Dynasties. (transl. Richard L. Davis). New York: Columbia University Press. ISBN 0-231-12826-6.

== Derivative works ==
Several decades later (c. 1090), Wu Zhen published a 3-chapter Wudai Shiji Zuanwu (五代史記纂誤; "Compendium of Errors in the Historical Records of the Five Dynasties") which was appended to the original. This new work was considered lost in 18th-century Qing dynasty, but partly recovered by compilers of the Complete Library of the Four Treasuries from indications quoted in the 15th-century Yongle Encyclopedia. Thereafter, in 1778 Wu Lanting (吳蘭庭) published a 4-chapter Wudai Shiji Zuanwu Bu (五代史記纂誤補; "An Addendum to the Compendium of Errors in the Historical Records of the Five Dynasties"), and in 1888 Wu Guangyao (吳光耀) published a 6-chapter Wudai Shiji Zuanwu Xubu (五代史記纂誤續補; "Further Addendum to the Compendium of Errors in the Historical Records of the Five Dynasties").
