= Liu Churang =

Liu Churang (Chinese: 劉處讓) (881-April 6, 943), courtesy name Deqian (德謙), was a general of the Chinese Five Dynasties and Ten Kingdoms Period states Later Tang (including Later Tang's predecessor state Jin) and Later Jin, serving as a chief of staff (Shumishi) during the reign of Later Jin's founding emperor Shi Jingtang.

== Background ==
Liu Churang was born in 881, during the reign of Emperor Xizong of Tang. It is known that he was from Cang Prefecture (滄州, in modern Cangzhou, Hebei), but all that is known about his family background were the names of his grandfather Liu Xin (劉信) and father Liu Yu (劉喻). Based on his geographic origin and subsequent service under Zhang Wanjin (張萬進), it appeared likely that he first came under Zhang's service around the time that Zhang, then a general of the post-Tang state of Yan, was serving as the commander of the army of Yan's Yichang Circuit (義昌, headquartered at Cang Prefecture) as, in 912, Zhang, angry over the violence and licentiousness of Yichang's military governor (Jiedushi) Liu Jiwei (劉繼威, a son of Yan's emperor Liu Shouguang) — including Liu Jiwei's (likely forcible) sexual relations with women at Zhang's household — killed Liu Jiwei and then submitted petitions of submission to Yan's rival states Later Liang and Jin (which were archrivals of each other). Later Liang's emperor Zhu Quanzhong subsequently changed Yichang's name to Shunhua (順化) and commissioned Zhang as its military governor. It also appeared likely that Liu Churang then followed Zhang when he was transferred by Later Liang to Pinglu Circuit (平盧, headquartered in modern Weifang, Shandong) in 913, and then to Taining Circuit (泰寧, headquartered in modern Jining, Shandong). While Zhang served as the military governor of Taining, Liu Churang became a close associate of his.

== During Jin and Later Tang ==
As of 918, Later Liang was ruled by Zhu Quanzhong's son and successor Zhu Youzhen, and was steadily losing territory to Jin. It was also said that Zhu Youzhen's close associates often demanded bribes from regional governors, including Zhang Wanjin. In fall 918, when Zhang heard (incorrectly) that there was going to be a major Jin invasion into Later Liang territory south of the Yellow River (which, then, served as the rough boundary of the two states), he sent messengers to Jin, offering to submit to its prince Li Cunxu, and seeking aid. When this became known to Zhu Youzhen, he sent the general Liu Xun against Zhang. Liu Xun quickly put Taining's capital Yan Prefecture (兗州) under siege. By winter 919, the city was in desperate situation, but as the Jin and Later Liang forces were battling intensely on the Yellow River border, Jin was unable to send a relief force deep into Later Liang territory to save Zhang. Zhang sent Liu Churang to Li Cunxu's camp to beg relief. Li initially did not agree. Liu Churang went to the threshold of Li's tent and cut off one of his own ears, wailing, "If my request is not listened to, to live is worse than to die!" Li was impressed and was set to, despite the dangers, launch an army to try to save Zhang, but news arrived at that time that Liu Xun had already captured Yan and slaughtered Zhang's household, so the Jin army was never launched. Still, impressed with Liu Churang, Li made him a general in the Jin army. Shortly after, he was made the deputy protocol officer.

In 923, Li Cunxu declared himself the emperor of a new state of Later Tang (as, he claimed, the legitimate successor to Tang), and shortly after conquered Later Liang. Liu received an honorary minister title, and was often put in charge of delivering orders to major generals on Li Cunxu's behalf. He continued to serve in that role after Li Cunxu's death and succession by his adoptive brother Li Siyuan, and soon was given the title of director of protocol (引進使, Yinjinshi). In 932, he was given an imperial guard general title in addition to being director of protocol. In 933, with the warlord Meng Zhixiang the military governor of Xichuan Circuit (西川, headquartered in modern Chengdu, Sichuan) having cut off communications with the imperial government, Li Siyuan sent Liu on a mission to Xichuan to persuade Meng to at least nominally submit.

In 934, by which point Li Siyuan had died and been succeeded by his son Li Conghou, Liu was made the prefect of Xin Prefecture (忻州, in modern Xinzhou, Shanxi) as well as the director of the military storage on the northwest front, to help defend against the Khitan Empire. However, after Li Conghou was shortly after overthrown by his adoptive brother Li Congke, Liu was recalled to the capital in 935 to continue to serve as a general of the imperial guards. In 936, when Li Congke was facing two rebellions — one by his brother-in-law (Li Siyuan's son-in-law) Shi Jingtang the military governor of Hedong Circuit (河東, headquartered in modern Taiyuan, Shanxi) and the Tianxiong Circuit (天雄, headquartered in modern Handan, Hebei) officer Zhang Lingzhao (張令昭) (who had mutinied and expelled the military governor Liu Yanhao), Li Congke sent the general Fan Yanguang to attack the Tianxiong mutineers and commissioned Liu Churang as the director of supplies for the army north of the Yellow River, to aid Fan's campaign.

== During Later Jin ==
Shi Jingtang, who thereafter was declared the emperor of a new state of Later Jin by his ally, Khitan's Emperor Taizong, shortly after defeated, with Khitan aid, the Later Tang forces sent against him, and then headed toward the Later Tang capital Luoyang. Finding the situation hopeless, Li Congke committed suicide, ending Later Tang. Liu Churang returned to Luoyang and submitted to Shi. Shi made him one of the directors of palace affairs (宣徽使, Xuanhuishi).

In 937, Fan Yanguang, who had initially submitted to Shi, rebelled against him at Tianxiong. Initially, Liu was to serve under Yang Guangyuan in attacking Fan, but when shortly after, under Fan's inducement, Zhang Congbin (張從賓) also rebelled at Luoyang (by this point, Shi had moved the capital to Daliang), Liu was diverted to attack Zhang instead. After Zhang was defeated, the Later Jin forces put Tianxiong's capital Guangjin (廣晉) under siege. Fan considered surrendering, as Shi promised him that he would live, but was still hesitating. Liu entered the city to persuade him, and he subsequently surrendered. For the time being, Yang, who was in charge of the operations, left Liu temporarily in charge of Tianxiong.

Meanwhile, Shi had turned away from the Later Tang tradition of having generals serve in the powerful positions of chief of staff, and had his civilian chancellors Sang Weihan and Li Song assume those positions. This displeased Liu (who had design on the position himself) and the eunuchs. During the Guangjin siege, when Sang often rejected Yang's requests, Yang complained to Liu. Liu told Yang that this was all decided by the chancellors (and not by the emperor). Once Fan surrendered, Yang, who was then the preeminent general of the realm, submitted a secret list of policy proposals in which he severely criticized Sang and Li. Not wanting to alienate Yang, Shi removed Sang and Li from their chiefs of staff positions, making Liu the chief of staff instead.

However, this ran against Shi's own wishes, as he had long been averse to the idea of a powerful general serving as chief of staff, remembering the example of Li Siyuan's chief of staff An Chonghui. Further, while Liu served as chief of staff, most of his proposals were not to Shi's liking. In 939, when Liu took leave from governmental service to observe a mourning period for his stepmother, Shi took the opportunity to disband the office of chief of staff, transferring its authority to the office of the chancellors. Liu spent a mourning period of over a year before being recalled to governmental service to serve as the military governor of Zhangde Circuit (彰德, headquartered in modern Anyang, Henan).

It was said that while serving at Zhangde, Liu was diligent in carrying out his duties, and was not overly harsh in dealing with subordinates and the people. When Shi visited Yedu (鄴都, i.e., Guangjin) in 941 in anticipation of reacting to a rebellion by An Chongrong the military governor of Chengde Circuit (成德, headquartered in modern Shijiazhuang, Hebei), Liu, whose Zhangde Circuit was nearby, expended the resources of his circuit to make sure that the imperial army was well-supplied. He was subsequently recalled to the imperial government, and he initially thought that he would be given a prominent position given his seniority and experience, but was only made the general of the imperial guards, which he was not pleased about.

Shi died in 942 and was succeeded by his nephew Shi Chonggui. After Shi Chonggui became emperor, Liu went to see the chancellors and, citing his contributions, sought higher position, but was not given such position. One day when visiting the chancellors Feng Dao, Zhao Ying, Li Song, and He Ning, he was drunk and complained about them. It was said that Feng laughed the criticism off, although it was not stated what the other chancellors' reactions were. After a month, he claimed to be ill and apparently took a leave from his general position. When Shi Chonggui returned from Yedu to Daliang in 943, Liu accompanied him, and took residence at Fengshan Temple (封禪寺). While there, he became ill and died. He was given posthumous honors.

== Notes and references ==
- Old History of the Five Dynasties, vol. 94.
- New History of the Five Dynasties, vol. 47.
- Zizhi Tongjian, vols. 271, 281, 282.
