= Wang Jingchong (Five Dynasties) =

Chinese official and general (died 950)

Wang Jingchong (Chinese: 王景崇; died 15 January 950) was an official and general of China's Later Tang, Later Jin, Later Han, and Later Shu dynasties during the Five Dynasties and Ten Kingdoms period. During the reign of Emperor Yin of Later Han, Wang Jingchong, fearing defamation by the official Hou Yi (侯益), rebelled against the Later Han dynasty in conjunction with Li Shouzhen and Zhao Siwan (趙思綰), and submitted to the Later Shu dynasty. After repeated defeats, however, he committed suicide.

== Background ==
It is not known when Wang Jingchong was born, but it is known that he was from Xing Prefecture (邢州, in modern Xingtai, Hebei). He was said to be intelligent and capable of debating, as well as being good at serving others. During the time that the Jin general Li Siyuan served as the military governor (Jiedushi) of Anguo Circuit (安國, headquartered at Xing Prefecture), Wang served as an officer at his headquarters. He subsequently followed Li on his campaigns.

== During Later Tang ==
After Li Siyuan became emperor of Jin's successor state Later Tang in 926, Wang Jingchong became a protocol officer (通事舍人, Tongshi Sheren). He was often given responsibilities of welcoming emissaries from the circuits, delivering imperial edicts to the circuits, and monitoring armies on campaigns.

== During Later Jin ==
During the time of Later Tang's successor state Later Jin, founded by Li Siyuan's son-in-law Shi Jingtang, Wang Jingchong continued to serve the imperial government. In 937, when Shi was commissioning the general An Chongrong as the military governor of Chengde Circuit (成德, headquartered in modern Shijiazhuang, Hebei) to displace the Chengde officer Mi Qiong (秘瓊), who had seized control of the circuit in the confusion of Later Tang's fall and Later Jin's founding, Shi sent Wang to Chengde to persuade Mi to yield the control of the circuit to An. He was able to persuade Mi to do so.

Wang was eventually promoted to be a general of the imperial guards, but apparently had little actual authority. He was often distressed about not being given greater authority by the Later Jin emperors (Shi Jingtang and his nephew and successor Shi Chonggui).

== During the Liao dynasty ==
In 947, Later Jin was destroyed by its northern neighbor, the Liao dynasty. Emperor Taizong initially claimed to be the emperor of China as well, but soon tired of the uprisings against him. He left his brother-in-law Xiao Han in charge of the Later Jin capital Kaifeng (as military governor of Xuanwu Circuit (宣武)). During the time that Xiao was at Kaifeng, Wang tried to bribe Xiao's subordinate Gao Muohan (高謨翰), hoping that Xiao would give him greater authority. However, soon thereafter, Emperor Taizong died on the way back to Liao proper, and was succeeded by his nephew Emperor Shizong. The anti-Liao uprisings intensified, and Xiao wanted to abandon Xuanwu and return to Liao proper as well, but wanted to keep some resemblance of a continuation of government. He therefore forced Li Siyuan's son Li Congyi the Prince of Xu to assume the title of emperor, and then left Kaifeng in Li Congyi's control. Li Congyi commissioned Wang as the director of palace affairs (宣徽使, Xuanhuishi).

However, Li Congyi's court was not supported by the Han uprisings, and instead, the former Later Jin general Liu Zhiyuan, who had claimed the title of emperor of a new state of Later Han, was gaining strength. Liu was thereafter advancing toward Kaifeng. Wang took the money in the imperial treasury and left Kaifeng, submitting to Liu. Li Congyi subsequently submitted to Liu as well, allowing him to enter Kaifeng and take over control of the realm.

== During Later Han ==
After Liu Zhiyuan entered Kaifeng, he commissioned Wang Jingchong as a general of the imperial guards, but was not impressed by Wang at that point. He did not have Wang accompany him when, shortly after, Du Chongwei the military governor of Tianxiong Circuit (天雄, headquartered in modern Handan, Hebei), rose and resisted him and he then attacked Tianxiong's capital Yedu (鄴都) in response. Wang, however, volunteered to deliver the reports of the defender of Kaifeng (apparently, Liu's son Liu Chengxun (劉承訓)) to Liu Zhiyuan's camp. When he met Liu Zhiyuan to deliver the reports, he requested that he be allowed to remain in the imperial army and participate in the siege of Yedu. He also made many tactical proposals to Liu Zhiyuan and argued persuasively for his proposals, impressing Liu Zhiyuan.

During the time of Du's resistance against Liu Zhiyuan (which was not successful, and Du eventually surrendered to Liu), two Liao-commissioned military governors to the west, Hou Yi (侯益) the military governor of Fengxiang Circuit (鳳翔, headquartered in modern Baoji, Shaanxi) and Zhao Kuangzan (趙匡贊) the military governor of Jinchang Circuit (晉昌, headquartered in modern Xi'an, Shaanxi), were unsure of how they would be received by the Later Han emperor, and therefore submitted their realms to Later Shu's emperor Meng Chang. However, after Du's defeat, they both became fearful, offering to submit to Later Han and to head to Kaifeng to pay homage to the Later Han emperor, even as Later Shu forces were on the way to put those circuits firmly into Later Shu hands. Liu Zhiyuan decided to dispatch Wang and another general, Qi Cangzhen (齊藏珍) to the region, ostensibly against Dangxiang tribesmen who were intercepting Uyghur emissaries, but in reality to take control of Jinchang and Fengxiang. Before Wang departed Kaifeng, Liu summoned him into the emperor's bedroom and stated to him privately:

It is yet to be seen what are in Zhao Kuangzan's and Hou Yi's hearts. If, by the time you reach their circuits, they have already left to come to the imperial court, then do not question them further. If they were trying to delay to see what the situation might be, you are authorized to take whatever necessary actions there may be.

By the time that Wang and Qi arrived at Jinchang's capital Chang'an in spring 948, Zhao had already left for Kaifeng. Wang mobilized the Jinchang troops, as well as Zhao's personal guards (which he left in Chang'an in order to alleviate fears about him), to prepare to resist Later Shu forces, although he was concerned that Zhao's personal guards might flee, and therefore considered tattooing their faces to mark them. Zhao's officer Zhao Siwan was enthusiastic about the idea and volunteered to be tattooed first. Qi found this to be a sign of treachery, and therefore suggested that Wang kill Zhao Siwan; Wang refused. Wang subsequently defeated the Later Shu generals Li Tinggui (李廷珪), and the Later Shu forces withdrew, particularly after Hou changed his mind and resisted them.

During the meantime, though, Liu Zhiyuan died and was succeeded by his son Liu Chengyou. (Liu Chengxun was older, but had died earlier.) When Wang arrived at Fengxiang's capital Fengxiang Municipality, Hou had not yet left for Kaifeng. Wang quickly had the imperial guard soldiers under him take control of the city gates, and he considered, as his staff members suggested to him, killing Hou. However, he hesitated because the instructions he had were given by Liu Zhiyuan, without Liu Chengyou's knowledge, and that if he killed Hou, Liu Chengyou might believe that he had killed Hou wrongfully. Meanwhile, though, Hou had heard rumors that Wang might kill him, and therefore slipped out of the city and headed for Kaifeng. This upset Wang for not having anticipated Hou's action.

== Rebellion against Later Han and death ==
Upon Hou Yi's arrival at Kaifeng, he expended his wealth to bribe the major officials and generals that Liu Zhiyuan had left to be in charge of Liu Chengyou's administration, and therefore was made the mayor of Kaifeng. He then used his new influence in the Later Han imperial administration to repeatedly defame Wang Jingchong. Wang, hearing this, became disappointed and fearful. At that time, it happened that the imperial government sent the imperial attendant Wang Yi (王益) to summon Zhao Kuangzan's personal guards to Kaifeng. These guard soldiers became fearful, and Wang Jingchong encouraged them into mutinying. They therefore did, under Zhao Siwan's leadership, and seized control of Chang'an.

Meanwhile, Wang Jingchong himself enticed the people and officials at Fengxiang to petition the imperial government to have him (Wang) made military governor of Fengxiang. The imperial government, apprehensive about Wang Jingchong's intentions, refused, and issued orders transferring Wang Shou'en (王守恩) the military governor of Jingnan Circuit (靜難, headquartered in modern Xianyang, Shaanxi) to Jinchang (which was renamed Yongxing (永興)) and Zhao Hui (趙暉) the military governor of Baoyi Circuit (保義, headquartered in modern Sanmenxia, Henan) to Fengxiang. The same orders also commissioned Wang Jingchong as the acting military governor of Jingnan.

Wang Jingchong found excuses to delay his departure from Fengxiang, and for some time tried to order the Jingnan troops to join him. He also made overtures to Later Shu, testing out Later Shu's willingness to aid him. Meanwhile, around the same time, Li Shouzhen the military governor of Huguo Circuit (護國, headquartered in modern Yuncheng, Shanxi) rebelled and claimed the title of Prince of Qin. Wang thereafter accepted both commissions from Li Shouzhen and Later Shu, with Later Shu renaming Fengxiang to Qiyang (岐陽) and making him its military governor.

The Later Han imperial government sent the major general Guo Wei against the three rebels. Guo, under the advice of Hu Yanke (扈彥珂) and seeing Li as the main threat, decided to act against Li first, believing that once he destroyed Li, Zhao Siwan and Wang would be more easily defeated. He therefore marched directly to Huguo's capital Hezhong Municipality (河中) and put it under siege. Meanwhile, Zhao Hui advanced to Fengxiang and put it under siege. He defeated the Later Shu army that Meng Chang sent to aid Wang, and then had a corps of his army pretend to be the Later Shu army. When Wang exited Fengxiang to try to join his army with the "Later Shu" army, he was caught in a trap and defeated. He fled back inside the city and continued to defend it. Another subsequent attempt by the Later Shu general An Siqian (安思謙) to aid Wang was also repelled by Zhao.

By late 949, Wang's potential allies were all destroyed or repelled – with Zhao Siwan's having first surrendered to Later Han but then reconsidering a rebellion, and then was killed; Li's city of Hezhong having fallen to Guo and Li's having committed suicide; and Later Shu forces making no inroads into aiding him. Wang's strategist Zhou Can (周璨) suggested to him that he surrender to Later Han. Wang hesitated. Several days later, with the city close to falling to Zhao Hui, Wang ordered his officers Gongsun Nian (公孫輦) and Zhang Silian (張思練) to pretend to surrender to Zhao by heading out the east gate and setting fire to it, while he and Zhou would attack Zhao's forces at the north gate. When Gongsun and Zhang were carrying out their part of the orders, they received news that Wang had set his own headquarters on fire, and his family had died in the fire. They, and Zhou, all surrendered to Zhao Hui.

== Notes and references ==
- New History of the Five Dynasties, vol. 53.
- Zizhi Tongjian, vols. 281, 287, 288.
