= Liu Zhiyuan =

Later Han emperor from 947 to 948

Emperor Gaozu of Later Han 後漢高祖
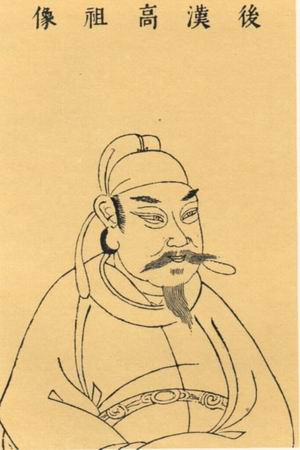

Emperor of the Later Han dynasty
- Reign: March 10, 947 – March 10, 948
- Successor: Liu Chengyou
- Born: March 4, 895
- Died: March 10, 948 (aged 53)
- Burial: Rui Mausoleum (睿陵; in modern Yuzhou, Henan)
- Consort: Empress Li
Full name
- Family name: Liú (劉); Given name: Initially Zhīyuǎn (知遠), later Gǎo (暠) (changed 948)
Era dates
- Tiānfú (天福) (adopted from Shi Jingtang (Emperor Gaozu of Later Jin): 947; Qiányòu (乾祐): 948
Posthumous name
- Emperor Ruìwén Shèngwǔ Zhāosù Xiào (睿文聖武昭肅孝皇帝)
Temple name
- Gāozǔ (高祖)
- House: Liu
- Dynasty: Later Han

Liu Zhiyuan (Chinese: 劉知遠) (March 4, 895 – March 10, 948), later changed to Liu Gao (劉暠), also known by his temple name as the Emperor Gaozu of Later Han (後漢高祖), was the founding emperor of the Shatuo-led Chinese Later Han dynasty, the fourth of the Five Dynasties during the Five Dynasties and Ten Kingdoms period. He was the older brother of the Northern Han founder Liu Min (Emperor Shizu).

== Background ==
Liu Zhiyuan was born in 895, during the reign of Emperor Zhaozong of Tang, at Taiyuan. His ancestors were of Shatuo extraction. His father Liu Dian (劉琠) served as an officer under the major late-Tang warlord Li Keyong the military governor of Hedong Circuit (河東, headquartered at Taiyuan). His mother was a Lady An, likely Liu Dian's wife. He had at least one other brother of the same father (and possibly of the same mother), Liu Chong. Lady An — likely after Liu Dian's death — bore a son to a man with the surname of Murong. This half-brother of Liu Zhiyuan's was named Murong Yanchao. Liu Zhiyuan was said to be serious in his disposition as a young man. He became a guard soldier for Li Keyong's adoptive son Li Siyuan.

== During Jin and Later Tang ==
In 907, Li Keyong's archrival Zhu Quanzhong the military governor of Xuanwu Circuit (宣武, headquartered in modern Kaifeng, Henan), who then had the Tang imperial court under his control, seized the throne from Emperor Zhaozong's son and successor Emperor Ai, ending Tang and starting a new dynasty known as Later Liang. Li Keyong and several other warlords refused to recognize him as the new emperor, and Li Keyong, from that on, became effectively the ruler of an independent state of Jin, which, under him and his biological son and successor Li Cunxu, engaged in numerous wars with Later Liang. In 919, there was a battle at Desheng (德勝, in modern Puyang, Henan), a fortress on the Yellow River that Li Cunxu was trying to enlarge. During the battle, Li Siyuan's son-in-law Shi Jingtang, who served as one of the commanders under him, was stricken by a Later Liang soldier, and his horse's armor was broken. Liu Zhiyuan, who was near Shi at that time, gave Shi his own armored horse, while taking Shi's horse and moving gradually, such that the Later Liang soldiers in pursuit believed that he was leading them into a trap, and broke off the pursuit. From this point on, he became close to Shi.

By 932 — at which point Jin had destroyed Later Liang and taken over its territory as a new state of Later Tang, and Li Siyuan was its emperor — Shi was made the military governor of Hedong. He made Liu and Zhou Gui (周瓌) the commanders of his guards, entrusting military matters to Liu and financial matters to Zhou.

In 934, by which time Li Siyuan's biological son Li Conghou was emperor, Li Conghou's chiefs of staff Zhu Hongzhao and Feng Yun, suspicious of both Shi and Li Siyuan's adoptive son Li Congke, then the military governor of Fengxiang Circuit (鳳翔, headquartered in modern Baoji, Shaanxi), decided to move them to other circuits. They issued a number of orders, moving Li Congke from Fengxiang to Hedong, Shi from Hedong to Chengde Circuit (成德, headquartered in modern Shijiazhuang, Hebei), and Chengde's military governor Fan Yanguang to Tianxiong Circuit (天雄, headquartered in modern Handan, Hebei). Li Congke, fearful of what the consequences might be if he gave up his military command, rebelled. He defeated the first army Li Conghou sent against him, commanded by Wang Sitong, and a second army that Li Conghou sent against him, commanded by Kang Yicheng (康義誠), defected and submitted to him. Li Conghou fled the capital Luoyang and headed north, while Shi, hearing of Li Congke's rebellion, was heading toward Luoyang himself, with the intent of bolstering Li Conghou. They encountered each other near Wei Prefecture (衛州, in modern Puyang). Li Conghou was initially pleased at Shi's arrival, but Shi, realizing that it would be difficult to defeat Li Congke at this point, changed his mind and refused to support Li Conghou. Angry at Shi's betrayal, Li Conghou's guards She Shourong (沙守榮) and Ben Hongjin (奔洪進) rebuked Shi and tried to attack him, resulting in a melee in which Sha and Shi's guard Chen Hui (陳暉) killed each other, and Ben committed suicide. Hearing of the melee, Liu led Shi's guard soldiers in and slaughtered all of Li Conghou's guards. Shi then departed for Luoyang to pay allegiance to Li Congke, while leaving Li Conghou, by himself, at Wei. (Li Congke subsequently declared himself emperor, and ordered Li Conghou's death.) While Li Congke had long disliked and was apprehensive of Shi, he, at the urging of Shi's wife (his sister) the Princess of Wei, and the princess' mother Empress Dowager Cao, returned Shi to Hedong.

In 935, there was an incident where Shi, then with the Hedong army at Xin Prefecture (忻州, in modern Xinzhou, Shanxi) to defend against a potential Khitan incursion, was present with an imperial messenger, who was delivering Li Congke's edict issuing the soldiers summer clothing. As the messenger read the edict, the soldiers instead were chanting, "May you live 10,000 years!" at Shi — a blessing that should have been reserved to the emperor. Shi, in fear that he would be seen as contending to the throne, considered what to do. At the urging of the staff member Duan Xiyao (段希堯), Shi had Liu arrest 36 of the leading chanters and execute them. Still, these executions did not calm Li Congke's apprehension of Shi.

In 936, believing that Shi might rebel anyway and that he should catch Shi unprepared, Li Congke issued an edict moving Shi from Hedong to Tianping Circuit (天平, headquartered in modern Tai'an, Shandong) and making the imperial guard general Song Shenqian (宋審虔) the military governor of Hedong. Fearful of the consequences, Shi summoned his key officers and sought their advice. Zhao Ying recommended that he report to Tianping. Xue Rong (薛融) was noncommittal. Liu recommended resistance, a recommendation that joined by Sang Weihan, who further suggested that he seek aid from Khitan's Emperor Taizong. Shi agreed, and had Sang draft a petition for him in which he offered to submit to Emperor Taizong as subject and son and to cede Lulong Circuit (盧龍, headquartered in modern Beijing) and Hedong's prefectures north of the Yanmen Pass (Yanyun 16 Prefectures) to Khitan. Liu argued against the contents of the petition, finding it too humiliating to submit as a son in addition to be subject, and also finding the cession to be unnecessary, but Shi did not listen to him.

When the Later Tang army, commanded by Zhang Jingda, subsequently arrived at Taiyuan, it put Taiyuan under siege. Shi put Liu in charge of Taiyuan's defenses. It was said that Liu carried out discipline fairly and treated the soldiers equally, such that none resented it and all stayed loyal to Shi. When Shi climbed up the city walls to review its defenses, Liu stated to him, "I see that Zhang Jingda and his ilk built tall fortresses and deep trenches, hoping to make the siege last a long time. They have no other special tactics for us to worry about. May you, Lord, send out messengers to try to manage the external relations. Defending this city is easy, and I, Liu Zhiyuan, can do it myself." Shi held his hand and caressed his back, greatly appreciating him.

Later in the year, Emperor Taizong arrived with a Khitan relief army, which engaged the Later Tang army. Shi sent Liu to aid the Khitan army in the engagement, in which the joint Khitan/Hedong forces eventually routed the Later Tang army, killing many. The remnants of the Later Tang army withdrew to Jin'an Base (晉安寨), near Taiyuan, and the Khitan and Hedong armies then had Jin'an surrounded. Under Liu's suggestion, Shi slaughtered the 1,000 Later Tang soldiers that the Hedong army captured.

== During Later Jin ==
=== During Shi Jingtang's reign ===
In winter 936, Emperor Taizong declared Shi Jingtang the emperor of a new state of Later Jin. As part of Shi's orders establishing an imperial administration, Liu Zhiyuan was made the commander of his guards. Subsequently, after the Later Tang army at Jin'an finally capitulated, and the joint Khitan/Later Jin forces prepared to head south toward the Later Tang capital Luoyang, the former Later Tang general Yang Guangyuan (who had assassinated Zhang Jingda and surrendered) was made the commander of the imperial guards, and Liu made the discipline officer of the guards, but was also given the military governorship of Baoyi Circuit (保義, headquartered in modern Sanmenxia, Henan). Eventually, when the joint army reached Lu Prefecture (潞州, in modern Changzhi, Shanxi), Emperor Taizong decided to head back to Liao with his Khitan army to avoid the Han Chinese from being shocked by the presence of Khitans. As he prepared to leave, he stated to Shi, "Liu Zhiyuan, Zhao Ying, and Sang Weihan are all great contributors to your establishment of the empire. Do not abandon them unless they had major faults."

As Shi headed for Luoyang, Li Congke, finding defeat inevitable, committed suicide by immolation with his family and officers closed to him. Shi subsequently entered Luoyang. As part of his initial preparations, he put Liu in charge of the city. It was said that Liu was effective in making sure that the Han soldiers were all properly housed in their camps and that the Khitan support soldiers that Emperor Taizong left for Shi were housed at a temple, with neither the Han nor the Khitan pillaging the people. Within a few days, the city was back in order.

In 937, Fan Yanguang, who had initially submitted to Shi, rebelled at Tianxiong. Soon, the general Zhang Congbin (張從賓) also rebelled near Luoyang and seized control of the city. Shi, who had made Kaifeng his capital, sent Yang to lead the army against Fan and Shi's brother-in-law Du Chongwei against Zhang. At that time, it was said that because of these rebellions (as well as a suppressed mutiny at Hua Prefecture (滑州, in modern Anyang, Henan), the people of the new Later Jin state were in great shock. When Shi asked Liu for his opinions on what to do, Liu responded:

For an emperor to rise, it must be by the Mandate of Heaven. When Your Imperial Majesty was at Jinyang [(i.e., Taiyuan)], you did not have more than five days of food left, but you were able to eventually establish your empire. Now the state is firm; we have elite forces internally, and we have a northern alliance with strong barbarians [(i.e., the Khitan)]. How can these rodents do much? May it be that you, Your Imperial Majesty, can comfort generals and chancellors with grace. I ask you to allow me to govern the soldiers with force. When there is both grace and force, the capital will be pacified. Once the root is secure, there will be no harm to branches or leaves.

Liu subsequently imposed strict discipline on the soldiers, such that the imperial guard soldiers did not dare to violate his regulations. Subsequently, Zhang was defeated in battle and died in flight, while Fan surrendered. In fall 937, Liu's military governorship was moved to Zhongwu Circuit (忠武, headquartered in modern Xuchang, Henan), and he remained the discipline officer of the imperial guards. In winter 938, he was made the commander of the imperial guards, after Yang was made the military governor of Tianxiong. His military governorship was shortly after moved to Guide Circuit (歸德, headquartered in modern Shangqiu, Henan). When, subsequently, Shi bestowed — in the same edict — honorary chancellorships (with the title of Tong Zhongshu Menxia Pingzhangshi (同中書門下平章事) on both him and Du, Liu felt insulted that he was named in the same edict as Du, whom he considered to be lacking in achievement and receiving honors only because of his marital relationship with Shi. He therefore initially declined. Knowing that Liu felt insulted, Shi was angered, and considered relieving Liu of his military command. Zhao, however, pointed out Liu's great contribution in defending Taiyuan, urged against Shi's doing so. Shi thereafter had the imperial scholar He Ning visit Liu to deliver the edict again. Liu, realizing the seriousness of the situation, this time accepted with humility.

In 940, Liu was made the defender of Yedu (鄴都, i.e., formerly Tianxiong's capital Wei Prefecture (魏州)). In 941, with Shi being apprehensive that An Chongrong the military governor of Chengde, who continuously made an issue of Shi's alliance with Khitan (now known as Liao) would rebel, Liu was moved to Hedong to serve as its military governor. Du, who was Liu's deputy as the commander of the imperial guards at that point, was made the commander of the imperial guards. As this change came at the endorsement of the chancellors Feng Dao and Li Song, Liu became resentful of them.

In late 941, as An Chongrong prepared to rebel (in alliance with An Congjin the military governor of Shannan East Circuit (山南東道, headquartered in modern Xiangyang, Hubei)), he declared to nearby circuits that he had the support of Tuyuhun, Dada (達韃), and Qibi (契苾) tribes. In order to divert the Tuyuhun support from An Chongrong, Liu sent his close associate Guo Wei to meet with the Tuyuhun chieftain Bai Chengfu (白承福), offering to give his people good grazing land (as their prior grazing land, in the northern part of Hedong, had been ceded to Liao) and pointing out that An Chongrong's rebellion was not likely to succeed. Bai was enticed, and left An Chongrong to submit to Liu. Liu settled Bai's Tuyuhun people between Taiyuan and Lan (嵐州) and Shi (石州) Prefectures (both in modern Lüliang, Shanxi), took Bai's elite soldiers under his own command, and endorsed having Bai be given the military governorship of Datong Circuit (大同, headquartered in modern Datong, Shanxi — but honorary at that time, as Datong had been ceded to Liao). This, as well as the Dada's and Qibi's failure to join An Chongrong, weakened An Chongrong's rebellion, which soon failed.

At this time, Shi Jingtang was very ill. He intended to have his only surviving biological son, Shi Chongrui (石重睿), succeed him, and have Feng be the chief chancellor for Shi Chongrui in the coming administration. As part of what he planned, he also drafted an order summoning Liu from Hedong to assist. However, Shi Jingtang's biological nephew and adoptive son Shi Chonggui the Prince of Qi suppressed that order and did not have it actually issued. When Shi Jingtang died shortly after, Feng, after consulting the imperial guard discipline officer Jing Yanguang, believed that an older emperor would more appropriate for the state at that time given the frequent rebellions. They thus supported Shi Chonggui as the new emperor. When Liu later found out about this sequence of events, he came to resent the new emperor.

=== During Shi Chonggui's reign ===
Under Jing Yanguang's advice, Shi Chonggui took a hard line against Liao, including refusing to submit as a subject (referring to himself only as "grandson," as Shi Jingtang had referred to himself as "son emperor" and honored Liao's Emperor Taizong as "father emperor"), and arresting Liao merchants in Later Jin territory and seizing their assets. It was said that Liu Zhiyuan knew that Jing's advice would eventually bring disaster on the state, but because Jing was the leading chancellor at that point, he did not dare to speak. Instead, he recruited more soldiers to add to the Hedong army, establishing more than 10 corps to defend against the potential Liao attack.

In 944, Liao launched a major invasion into Later Jin, anticipating that Yang Guangyuan, then the military governor of Pinglu Circuit (平盧, headquartered in modern Weifang, Shandong) and in secret communications with Liao, would rebel and join the Liao operations. As part of the operations, Emperor Taizong, whose main forces headed toward Tianxiong, sent his uncle Yelü Anduan (耶律安端) the Prince of Wei to attack Hedong. As part of the Later Jin defense, Shi Chonggui commissioned Liu as the commander of the operations against You Prefecture (幽州, capital of Lulong) with Du Wei (i.e., Du Chongwei, who changed his name to Du Wei to observe naming taboo for Shi Chonggui), then the military governor of Shunguo Circuit (順國, i.e., Chengde, the name of which was changed to Shunguo after An Chongrong's rebellion) serving as his deputy and Ma Quanjie (馬全節) the military governor of Yiwu Circuit (義武, headquartered in modern Baoding, Hebei) serving as the disciplinary officer, apparently to try to distract the main Liao operations. However, after Liu, in cooperation with Bai Chengfu, repelled Yelü Anduan's incursion, Liu made no additional action against Liao despite Shi Chonggui's orders to have him join forces with Du and Ma at Xing Prefecture (邢州, in modern Xingtai, Hebei) and to send forces north to attack Liao. Still, after the eventual Liao withdrawal (and Yang's defeat and death), Liu was given the title of the commander of the armies to the north, although he had no actual participation in the overall strategies, as Shi was suspicious of him, stating to close associates, "Given that Taiyuan is not aiding me, he [(i.e., Liu)] must have other plans. If so, it would be good it he carried out soon!" Liu was aware of the alienation, and decided to just be careful and defend Hedong. When Guo Wei saw Liu with worried expressions, he stated to Liu, "Hedong's mountains and rivers are secure to defend. Its people have a military tradition, and it is full of soldiers and horses. When they are at peace, they are diligent in tending the fields. When they are active, they get trained in military matters. This is your asset in becoming the lord of the people. Why do you worry?" Shi also created him the title of Prince of Taiyuan, later changed to Prince of Beiping.

Meanwhile, due to Bai's contributions in the resistance against Liao, Shi often summoned him to the imperial court and awarded him greatly. As of 946, Bai was defending Hua Prefecture with Zhang Cong'en (張從恩), while his Tuyuhun tribespeople were grazing in the Taiyuan-Lan-Shi region. When they violated the law, Liu did not treat them with grace. The tribespeople, knowing that the Later Jin imperial forces were weak and fearing Liu's strictness, considered fleeing back to their former lands (now possessed by Liao). One of the tribal leaders, Bai Kejiu (白可久), whose position in the tribe was only second to Bai Chengfu, first took his own people and fled to Liao. Emperor Taizong commissioned him as the governor of Yun Prefecture (雲州, in modern Datong), to try to entice Bai Chengfu. Liu began to be apprehensive of Bai Chengfu, and he, in consulting with Guo, decided to act against Bai, who, at that point, was said to be so rich that his horses had silver-lined stables. Guo suggested that Liu kill Bai and confiscate his assets for military use. Liu thereafter submitted a secret petition to Shi, stating, "The Tuyuhun keep changing positions, and it is difficult to keep them loyal. Please move them to the interior." Shi ordered that some 1,900 of the Tuyuhun tribespeople be moved to the interior prefectures. Liu then tricked Bai and some of his key followers into the city of Taiyuan, and then falsely accused Bai and four other tribal leaders of planning a rebellion. He had soldiers surround and kill them and their clans, for a total of some 400 people. He seized their assets. Shi issued an edict praising Liu for his actions. It was said that from that point on, the Tuyuhun people were weakened.

Around the same time, Liu's half-brother Murong Yanchao the prefect of Pu Prefecture (濮州, in modern Puyang, Henan), was accused of collecting an unauthorized tax, and making an unauthorized withdrawal from the wheat storage to give to his soldiers. The imperial guard general Li Yantao (李彥韜) long had an adversarial relationship with Murong, and tried to persuade Shi's chief of staff Feng Yu to have Murong executed. Liu submitted a petition to try to save Murong's life. The other chief of staff, Li Song believed that Murong's offenses were shared by many generals throughout the realm, and that if Murong were executed, no one would feel secure. As a result, Murong was spared of his life, but he was stripped of his offices and exiled to Fang Prefecture (房州, in modern Shiyan, Hubei).

In 946, Emperor Taizong decided to create a trap for Later Jin. He spread false news that Zhao Yanshou was intending to defect to Later Jin, rumors that were believed by Feng and Li Song. After discussions between Shi Chonggui, Feng, and Li Song, it was agreed that a large army would be launched, commanded by Du, with Li Shouzhen serving as his deputy. Du's army was soon launched, but as it approached Liao territory, was met by a large, highly mobile Liao army commanded by Emperor Taizong himself. It tried to retreat, but became encircled by the Liao army at Zhongdu Bridge (中度橋, in modern Baoding, Hebei). After Emperor Taizong made a promise (which he would eventually repudiate) to have Du made emperor, Du and Li Shouzhen surrendered with their army. As virtually the entire Later Jin imperial army was under Du's command, Kaifeng was left defenseless, and the Liao army advanced quickly toward it. Shi Chonggui, after initially considering summoning Liu but then deciding against it, surrendered, ending Later Jin.

== During brief Liao rule of Central Plain ==
Liao's Emperor Taizong declared himself emperor of China, and most Later Jin military governors submitted to him and went to Kaifeng to pay homage to him; two exceptions were Shi Kuangwei (史匡威) the military governor of Zhangyi Circuit (彰義, headquartered in modern Pingliang, Gansu), who refused his orders, and He Chongjian (何重建) the military governor of Xiongwu Circuit (雄武, headquartered in modern Tianshui, Gansu), who executed his messengers and submitted the circuit to Later Shu. As for Liu Zhiyuan, he firmed up Hedong's defenses and then sent his subordinate Wang Jun to submit three petitions to Emperor Taizong, showing submission. First, he congratulated the Liao emperor on entering Kaifeng. Second, he claimed that he could not leave Taiyuan to come pay homage because Taiyuan was where the Han and the non-Han were mixed and where many soldiers were stationed. Third, he claimed that he was ready to submit tributes to the emperor, but that the Liao general Liu Jiu (劉久) was just outside Taiyuan and watching the city, causing the people of the city to be apprehensive, so (he claimed) if Liu Jiu's army were withdrawn, he would submit tributes immediately.

In response to Liu's petitions, Emperor Taizong issued an edict praising him, referring to him as "son" in the edict. He also bestowed a wooden cane on Liu — a special award that he had only previously bestowed on Yelü Anduan, as his uncle. Subsequently, Liu sent the deputy defender of Taiyuan, Bai Wenke (白文珂), to submit an unusual horse as a tribute. However, Emperor Taizong realized that Liu was still observing the situation and not committing to Liao, and therefore had Bai return and deliver the message from him, stating, "You did not serve the southern dynasty [(i.e., Later Jin)], and now you are not serving the northern dynasty [(i.e., Liao)]. What are you intending?" Guo Wei advised against fully submitting to Liao, stating to Liu, "Barbarians hate us deeply. As Wang Jun opined, the Khitan are greedy and cruel, and they will not have China for long." There were also others who suggested that Liu rise against Liao immediately, but he responded:

Sometimes you have to use force quickly, and sometimes you have to use it slowly, depending on the situation. Currently, the Khitan possess newly surrendered Jin forces numbering 100,000, and are occupying the capital like a tiger. If there were no new developments, how could we act suddenly? It appears to me that what they wanted are goods and wealth. Once they are satisfied with goods and wealth, they will return to the north. In particular, the ice and snow have melted, so they cannot stay for long. We should wait until they leave, and then seize the territory. That is the perfect strategy.

However, when Zhang Cong'en, then the military governor of Zhaoyi Circuit (昭義, headquartered in Changzhi, Shanxi), whose territory was close to Luoyang, which Liao controlled, considered going to Kaifeng to pay homage to Emperor Taizong but secretly consulted Liu, Liu stated to him, "I have but a small piece of territory, so how would I dare to oppose the great realm? You, Lord, should go first. I will follow you." Zhang therefore went to Kaifeng. Meanwhile, Gao Conghui, the ruler of the semi-independent realm Jingnan, offered tributes to Emperor Taizong, but also sent messengers to Hedong to encourage Liu to declare himself emperor.

When Liu subsequently received the news of He Chongjian's submission to Later Shu and lamented that it was the lack of a Chinese emperor that led to He's submission, his staff members encouraged him to take the throne himself, but he hesitated. Hearing that Emperor Taizong was having Shi Chonggui delivered north to Liao proper, Liu declared that he would launch a campaign and intercept the Later Jin emperor and welcome him back to Taiyuan. Guo Wei and Yang Bin, however, argued to him that right now the people's minds are unsettled, and that if he continued to hesitate, someone else might take advantage of the situation. He agreed, and on March 10 declared himself emperor. (This state would later be known as Later Han, but Liu himself did not declare the name of the state at this point; in fact, stating that he did not want to forget Later Jin, he used Shi Jingtang's era name of Tianfu at this point (while ignoring Shi Chonggui's era name of Kaiyun).)

== Reign as emperor of Later Han ==
=== March to Kaifeng ===
Upon hearing the news that Liu Zhiyuan had declared himself emperor, Liao's Emperor Taizong initially stationed several generals to prepare to impede him. However, the nearby circuits soon began to declare loyalty to Liu. Finding the Han Chinese to be turning against him, Emperor Taizong decided to return to Liao proper, although he left his cousin (his mother Empress Dowager Shulü's nephew) Xiao Han in command at Kaifeng as Xuanwu Circuit's military governor. He fell ill on the way back to Liao proper, and died near Heng Prefecture (恆州, Shunguo's capital). His nephew Yelü Ruan the Prince of Yongkang, after a power struggle with the Han Chinese general Zhao Yanshou, claimed the Liao throne (as Emperor Shizong).

Meanwhile, Liu created his wife Empress Li empress. Hearing of Emperor Taizong's departure from Kaifeng, he decided to march toward it, with Shi Hongzhao serving as his forward commander. He marched toward the Luoyang-Kaifeng region. Xiao became fearful and decided that he should withdraw from the region as well, but also believed that if there were no one in command at Kaifeng, the region would fall into turmoil and it would be impossible for him to withdraw. He therefore seized Li Siyuan's youngest son Li Congyi and declared Li Congyi emperor, before departing Kaifeng. Li Congyi's mother Consort Dowager Wang, however, finding the situation hopeless, had Li Congyi demote his own title to Prince of Liang after Xiao left, and submitted a petition welcoming Liu to Kaifeng. Liu subsequently arrived at Luoyang, and sent the general Guo Congyi (郭從義) to Kaifeng to kill Li Congyi and Consort Dowager Wang, before he headed to Kaifeng himself.

=== Reign at Kaifeng ===
Once at Kaifeng, Liu Zhiyuan declared it the eastern capital and Luoyang the western capital. He also declared the name of his state to be Han, but (for the time being) continued to use the era name of Tianfu, stating, "I do not yet have the heart to forget Jin." Meanwhile, the military governors of various circuits continued to submit to him. That included Du Chongwei, who was then the military governor of Tianxiong, but Du was apprehensive because of his prior submission to Liao. When Liu then issued an edict moving him to Guide Circuit and moving Guide's military governor Gao Xingzhou to Tianxiong, Du rebelled and sought aid from the Liao general Yelü Mada (耶律麻荅), who had been left in control of Heng by Emperor Shizong. Liu declared a campaign against Du and commissioned Gao as the commander of the army against Du, with Murong Yanchao serving as Gao's deputy. Shortly after, the Han soldiers at Heng rose against Yelü Mada, and he was forced to flee himself, leaving Du supportless.

However, Du continued to hold Yedu's defenses, aided by the Liao general Zhang Lian (張璉), who commanded Han Chinese soldiers from You Prefecture and who was particularly against Liu, because Liu had, upon entering Kaifeng, slaughtered the You Prefecture soldiers stationed there. Gao decided to try to surround the city for a long time to force its surrender, rather than force a costly battle. When Liu decided to go to the front himself to oversee the situation (as Du had previously claimed that if Liu came, he would surrender), Du continued to hold the defenses, and an attack advocated by Murong was unsuccessful, so Gao continued his strategy of surrounding the city. By the end of the year, the city was starving, and Du surrendered. Liu, against his own promise that Zhang would be spared, executed Zhang and his officers, although the soldiers were allowed to leave for You. Du was spared, but his assets were confiscated and awarded to the Later Han soldiers. This episode brought a strong criticism from the Song historian Sima Guang, the lead editor of the Zizhi Tongjian:

Han's Emperor Gaozu killed 1,500 innocent soldiers from You; this showed a lack of compassion. He enticed Zhang Lian and then executed Zhang; this showed a lack of faith. He pardoned Du Chongwei despite Du's great crimes; this showed a lack of proper punishment. Compassion is used to unite the people; faith is used to properly command others; and punishment is used to punish the wicked. If one did not have these three things, how does one protect a state? It is appropriate that the life of his state was not long.

Meanwhile, on Later Han's western border, there was the issue that Zhao Yanshou's son Zhao Kuangzan (趙匡贊) the military governor of Jinchang Circuit (晉昌, headquartered in modern Xi'an, Shaanxi) and Hou Yi (侯益) the military governor of Fengxiang, both having apprehensions about how they might be received by the Later Han emperor, submitted to Later Shu. In spring 948, Liu sent the imperial guard general Wang Jingchong west to attack Zhao and Hou. As Zhao was preparing to leave his own circuit and head to Later Shi's capital Chengdu, Zhao's staff member Li Su (李恕), however, persuaded Zhao that he should submit to Later Han, pointing out that Later Shu was a smaller state. Zhao therefore sent Li to Kaifeng to pay homage to Liu and to explain his prior actions. After receiving assurances from Liu that he would be accepted, Zhao offered to submit. Hou also changed his mind and resubmitted to Later Han. Liu decided to nevertheless send Wang to the west, under the excuse that the Ganzhou Huigu's emissaries were being intercepted by the Dangxiang (i.e., Dingnan Circuit) and needed escort. He gave Wang secret instructions, "The hearts of Zhao Kuangzan and Hou Yi still cannot be known. When you get there, if they have already departed to come pay homage to me, then do not act further. If they were delaying and observing developments, act as you see fit." When Wang reached the Jinchang capital Chang'an, Zhao had already departed, so Wang took his soldiers as well while trying to decide what to do with Hou, who resisted Later Shu but was also not immediately departing for Kaifeng.

While Liu Zhiyuan was on the campaign against Du, his oldest son Liu Chengxun (劉承訓), who was said to be kind, faithful, gentle, and capable, died. It was said that the people were saddened by Liu Chengxun's passing. Liu Zhiyuan himself was greatly saddened, and it caused him to begin to be ill. By spring 948, he was extremely ill. He entrusted his younger son Liu Chengyou to Su Fengji, Yang Bin, Shi Hongzhao, and Guo Wei, stating, "My remaining breaths are getting short, and I cannot speak much. Chengyou is young and weak, so what happens after my death has to be entrusted to you." He also told them to guard against Du Chongwei. After Liu Zhiyuan died the same day, these officials, without announcing his death, had Du and his sons put to death. Liu Chengyou was created the Prince of Zhou, and shortly after, when Liu Zhiyuan's death was announced, Liu Chengyou succeeded him as emperor.

== Family ==
- Father
  - Liu Dian (劉琠), posthumously honored Emperor Zhangsheng with the temple name of Xianzu
- Mother
  - Lady An, Lady Dowager of Wu, posthumously honored Empress Zhangyi
- Wife
  - Empress Li (created 947), mother of Prince Chengyou
- Children
  - Liu Chengxùn (劉承訓, note different tone than his brother) (922–948), posthumously created the Prince of Wei
  - Liu Chengyou (劉承祐) (931–950), the Prince of Zhou (created 948), later Emperor Yin of Later Han
  - Liu Chengxūn (劉承勛, note different tone than his brother) (d. 951), name later changed to Liu Xun (劉勛), posthumously created the Prince of Chen by Guo Wei
  - Princess Yongning (created 947), posthumously created Princess Qin (created 949)
- Adopted Child
  - Liu Yun (劉贇), biological child of Emperor Gaozu's brother Liu Chong (Emperor Shizu of Northern Han), the Duke of Huaiyin (created 951, executed by Guo Wei 951)

Liu Zhiyuan House of Liu (947–950) Born: 895 Died: 948
Regnal titles
| Preceded by None (dynasty founded) | Emperor of Later Han; 947–948 | Succeeded by Liu Chengyou (Emperor Yin) |
| Preceded by Emperor Taizong of Liao | Emperor of China (Central Shanxi); 947–948 | Succeeded by Liu Chengyou (Emperor Yin) |
| Preceded by Li Congyi | Emperor of China (Kaifeng region); 947–948 | Succeeded by Liu Chengyou (Emperor Yin) |
| Preceded by Emperor Shizong of Liao | Emperor of China (Central); 947–948 | Succeeded by Liu Chengyou (Emperor Yin) |
