= He Ning =

He Ning (Chinese: 和凝; 898 – July 23, 955), courtesy name Chengji (成績), noble title Duke of Lu (魯公), was an official of the Later Liang, Later Tang, Later Jin, Liao, Later Han, and Later Zhou dynasties, serving as a chancellor during the reigns of both Later Jin emperors, Shi Jingtang and Shi Chonggui, as well as during the Liao dynasty's brief rule over the Central Plains.

== Background ==
He Ning was born in 898, during the reign of Emperor Zhaozong of Tang. His family was from Xuchang (須昌, in modern Tai'an, Shandong). He claimed ninth-generation ancestry from He Fengyao (和逢堯), an imperial censor during the reign of Emperor Gaozong of Tang, early during Tang. However, his male-line ancestors were not in prominent governmental services after that, including his great-grandfather He Chang (和敞), grandfather He Ru (和濡), and father He Ju (和矩). He Ju was said to be a drinker who lacked adherence to social protocols, and was not learned, but was said to respect scholars such that he spent his wealth in receiving and aiding them. (This suggested that He Ju was a man of some wealth.)

He Ning himself was said to be intelligent and dextrous in his youth, and also had a handsome appearance. He was also studious, and it was said that he read books quickly and could understand their basics even when reading quickly.

== During Later Liang ==
When He Ning was 16 (914) — by which time Tang had fallen, and He Ning's home territory was under the rule of Tang's successor state Later Liang — he was set to submit to the imperial examinations in the Mingjing class. When he went to the capital Daliang to do so, however, he dreamed of a man who gave him a number of five-colored pens, and stating to him, "You, son, have such great talent; why do you not submit yourself for the Jinshi class?" (Jinshi was a more prestigious class of imperial examinations than Mingjing.) It was said that after that dream, He became even more impressive academically, and in 916, at age 18, he passed the imperial examinations in the Jinshi class.

After He passed the imperial examinations, then-military governor (Jiedushi) of Xuanyi Circuit (宣義, headquartered in modern Anyang, Henan), He Gui (賀瓌 — note different surname despite their identical rendition), who had heard of him by reputation, invited him to serve on staff. While serving on staff, He Ning also became known for his capability in archery.

As of late 918, He Gui was the supreme commander of the Later Liang troops against Later Liang's archrival to the north, Jin. Around new year 919, Jin's prince Li Cunxu, wanting to carry out a decisive attack to destroy Later Liang, crossed the Yellow River and tried to head for Daliang. He Gui tried to intercept him, and the armies engaged at Huliu Slope (胡柳陂, in modern Heze, Shandong). Both armies suffered tremendous losses during the battle. At one point during the battle, He Gui's army had suffered a crushing defeat, and no one was left to follow him other than He Ning. He Gui, believing doom to be coming, stated to He Ning, "Son, do not follow me. You should strive for yourself." He Ning wept and responded, "It is not my aspiration to be a man who was trusted by another but who then abandons him in disaster. I only would regret not dying in the right place." When a Jin cavalry soldier subsequently did try to chase He Gui down, He Ning first tried to scare him off but when the soldier persisted, He Ning fired an arrow and killed him. When they returned to headquarters the next day, He Gui told his sons, "Yesterday, but for Lord He, I would not be here. Lord He is capable in both civilian and military matters, and also has great ambition. He will surely be in an important position in the future. You should serve him carefully." He Gui thereafter gave He Ning a daughter in marriage, leading to He Ning's reputation becoming known. He later served three terms as secretary to military governors.

== During Later Tang ==
During the subsequent Tiancheng era (926-930), during the reign of Li Siyuan (Li Cunxu's adoptive brother) as emperor of Later Tang (as Li Cunxu's Jin state had been transformed into Later Tang, and then destroyed Later Liang), He Ning was recalled to the imperial government, then at Luoyang, to serve as an imperial censor with the title of Dianzhong Shi Yushi (殿中侍御史), and then served successively as Yuanwailang (員外郎) at the ministries of rites (禮部, Libu) and justice (刑部, Xingbu). He later served as Zhuke Yuanwailang (主客員外郎) at the ministry of rites but was also simultaneous put in charge of drafting edicts. Not long after, he was promoted to be an imperial scholar (翰林學士, Hanlin Xueshi) as well as the higher supervisory position of Zhuke Langzhong (主客郎中) at the ministry of rites. He was also put in charge of the imperial examinations. It had become custom at the office of the imperial examinations that on the day the results were announced, the doors would be tightly closed and protected by fences, to prevent rowdy examinees from charging the door. However, with He Ning in charge, he ordered that the fences be removed, and the doors be opened; despite that, because the examinees were respectful of him, no disturbance occurred. It was said that he was discerning and selected a number of examinees who were capable. As a result, Li Siyuan respected him more. He was subsequently promoted to be Zhongshu Sheren (中書舍人, a mid-level official at the legislative bureau of government (中書省, Zhongshu Sheng)), and then deputy minister of public works (工部侍郎, Gongbu Shilang), while continuing to serve as imperial scholar.

== During Later Jin ==
=== During Shi Jingtang's reign ===
In 936, Li Siyuan's son-in-law Shi Jingtang, then the military governor of Hedong Circuit (河東, headquartered in modern Taiyuan, Shanxi), rose in rebellion against then-emperor, Li Siyuan's adoptive son Li Congke, and, with aid from Later Tang's northern rival Khitan Empire, defeated Later Tang armies that Li Congke sent against him. Li Congke committed suicide, ending Later Tang, while Khitan's Emperor Taizong declared Shi the emperor of a new Later Jin state, which then took over the former Later Tang lands. He Ning initially continued to serve Shi as imperial scholar, and was in 937 given the greater title of imperial scholar at Duanming Hall (端明殿). After his promotion, he initially posted a notice on his door that he would no longer receive any guests (apparently to avoid people's making requests to him). A former low level official, Zhang Yi (張誼), however, wrote him and pointed out that, in serving as the emperor's eyes and ears, if he cut himself off from the public, he would not be able to observe what was occurring in the public properly. He Ning was impressed, and recommended Zhang to the chancellor Sang Weihan. In addition to being imperial scholar at Duanming Hall, he was also put in charge of the imperial treasury. Not long after, when the Duanming Hall positions were abolished, he was made chief imperial scholar (翰林學士承旨, Hanlin Xueshi Chengzhi). It was said that Shi often consulted him on key decisions and found his advice helpful.

In 940, He Ning was made Zhongshu Shilang (中書侍郎, deputy head of the legislative bureau) and chancellor, with the designation Tong Zhongshu Menxia Pingzhangshi (同中書門下平章事). In late 941, when Shi was preparing to depart then-capital Kaifeng to head to Yedu (鄴都, in modern Handan, Hebei) in anticipation of a rebellion by An Chongrong the military governor of nearby Chengde Circuit (成德, headquartered in modern Shijiazhuang, Hebei) so that he could react quickly, He Ning pointed out to him that after he left Kaifeng, another rebellious military governor, An Congjin of Shannan East Circuit (山南東道, headquartered in modern Xiangyang, Hubei), would surely rebel as well, and that Shi should prepare for it. Shi asked him was his advice was. He advised Shi that Shi should leave a number of blank edicts with Shi's adoptive son (biological nephew) Shi Chonggui the Prince of Zheng, whom Shi left in charge of Kaifeng, so that when An Congjin did rebel, Shi Chonggui could react quickly and commission appropriate generals to counterattack. Shi Jingtang agreed. Subsequently, when An Congjin did rebel, Shi Chonggui was quickly able to mobilize a number of generals to command the imperial army against him, with Gao Xingzhou in overall command. An Congjin was quickly defeated and forced to return to Shannan East's capital Xiang Prefecture (襄州) to defend it, and later committed suicide when the city fell.

=== During Shi Chonggui's reign ===
Shi Jingtang died in later 942. He was succeeded by Shi Chonggui. He Ning continued to serve as chancellor, and received the additional title of You Pushe (右僕射, one of the heads of the executive bureau (尚書省, Shangshu Sheng). In fall 945, He Ning was removed from his chancellor position and served only as You Pushe from this point on; he was replaced in the chancellorship by Feng Yu, the brother of Shi Chonggui's wife Empress Feng, who was already serving as a chief of staff. He was shortly after given the slightly higher title of Zuo Pushe (左僕射).

Contrary to Shi Jingtang's submissive posture toward Khitan (whose state's name had been changed to Liao by this point), Shi Chonggui took a confrontational stance against Liao, resulting in military confrontations between the two states. In late 946, Emperor Taizong made a major attack south, and, after forcing the surrender of the major Later Jin general Du Wei (Shi Jingtang's brother-in-law, Shi Chonggui's uncle), approached Kaifeng. Shi Chonggui, believing defeat to be inevitable, surrendered, ending Later Jin. Emperor Taizong entered Kaifeng.

== During the Liao occupation ==
Emperor Taizong claimed to be the emperor of China as well, and he took over the imperial administration structure left over from Later Jin, the territory of which largely submitted to him as emperor at that point. He commissioned He Ning as chancellor again with the titles of Zhongshu Shilang and Tong Zhongshu Menxia Pingzhangshi, serving along with Zhang Li, a formerly Later Tang imperial scholar whom he had captured during Later Tang's fall and who then served him after that point. However, the subsequent misrule by Emperor Taizong over the former Later Jin territory caused many rebellions to break out through the realm, and he decided to withdraw back Liao proper. He took many of the ethnically Han Chinese officials with him, including He Ning, leaving his brother-in-law Xiao Han in charge of Kaifeng as the military governor of Xuanwu Circuit (宣武, headquartered at Kaifeng). However, Emperor Taizong fell ill on the way and would not reach Liao proper alive, dying near Heng Prefecture (恆州, Chengde's capital).

In the aftermaths of Emperor Taizong's death, the Liao general Zhao Yanshou (also a son-in-law of Li Siyuan's, who was also captured by Emperor Taizong when Later Tang fell), to whom Emperor Taizong had previously promised the Chinese throne but then reneged on the promise, tried to take over Heng and claim the title of regent over the southern court (i.e., the former Later Jin domain). The ethnically Khitan Liao generals, however, had already resolved to support Emperor Taizong's nephew Yelü Ruan the Prince of Yongkang, and they quickly tricked Zhao and arrested him. Yelü Ruan then took the throne (as Emperor Shizong) at Heng.

Believing that his grandmother (Emperor Taizong's mother) Empress Dowager Shulü would not agree to his ascension (as she favored his uncle (Emperor Taizong's younger brother) Yelü Lihu), Emperor Shizong headed north to contend with her. Most of the ethnically Han officials accompanying Emperor Taizong were left at Heng, and he left Emperor Taizong's cousin Yelü Mada (耶律麻荅) in charge of Heng. Subsequently, Emperor Shizong sent an edict to Heng, ordering He Ning and a number of other Han officials, including fellow chancellors Feng Dao and Li Song, to rendezvous with him for Emperor Taizong's burial. However, at that time, a rebellion by the Han soldiers against Yelü Mada, led by the officers Bai Zairong (白再榮) and Li Rong, broke out at Heng. Initially, Yelü Mada's Khitan soldiers had the upper hand in street battles, but a turning point came when the official Li Gu, asked He Ning, Feng, and Li Song to visit the battle scene to encourage the Han soldiers. When the soldiers saw the three senior chancellors, they were encouraged, and they fought harder, eventually expelling the Khitan soldiers out of the city. Subsequently, the soldiers supported Bai to be the acting military governor of Chengde, so that he could submit to Later Han and seek aid. Meanwhile, Bai, who was greedy, wanted to kill Li Song and He Ning to seize their wealth. Li Gu rebuked him, pointing out that if he did so, the new Later Han emperor would surely have him punished, so Bai did not do so. Bai subsequently submitted the region to the sovereignty of Liu Zhiyuan, a former Later Jin military governor of Hedong who had declared himself emperor of Later Han.

== During Later Han ==
He Ning, along with Feng Dao and Li Song, shortly after returned to Kaifeng. Liu Zhiyuan gave him the honorary title of Taizi Taibao (太子太保). Sometime later, He Ning was also created the Duke of Lu.

== During Later Zhou ==
After Later Han was later displaced by Later Zhou, He Ning was given the honorary title of Taizi Taifu (太子太傅). He died in 955 after suffering an ulcer on his back. He was given posthumous honors.

== Personality and literary/musical works ==
He Ning was said to be meticulous in details. Ever since he began to serve as a junior official, to the time that he served as a chancellor, he made sure that his wagons and clothes were all properly decorated such that they impressed the onlookers. He was also intent on helping junior officials, such that he dealt humbly with those in lower positions no matter how able or not they were. He wrote all his life, and was particularly good at writing short, exotic songs. He created a 100-volume collection of his works, and he personally wrote them out for the purpose of creating printing woodblocks. He printed several hundred copies and distributed them.
