= Feng Yu =

Chinese politician

Feng Yu (Chinese: 馮玉) (died 952/953?), courtesy name Jingchen (璟臣), was a Chinese politician of the Later Tang, Later Jin, and the Liao dynasties of China. He was powerful during the reign of Later Jin's second emperor Shi Chonggui, as Shi's Empress Feng was his sister, and he became both chancellor and chief of staff (Shumishi). After Shi was defeated and taken captive by Liao's Emperor Taizong, Feng was taken to Liao as well and died there.

== Family background ==
It is not known when Feng Yu was born. His family was from Ding Prefecture (定州, in modern Baoding, Hebei), but it is (based on his father's career) unclear whether he was born there. His father Feng Meng (馮濛) was the liaison officer for Yiwu Circuit (義武, headquartered at Ding) to the Later Tang court early during the reign of the second Later Tang emperor Li Siyuan. Feng Meng was described to be intelligent but wicked, and he gained the favor of Li Siyuan's powerful chief of staff An Chonghui, and was eventually promoted to be the deputy defender of Yedu (鄴都, in modern Handan, Hebei). When Li Siyuan's son-in-law Shi Jingtang later became the defender of Yedu in 928, he became friendly with Feng Meng, and decided to take Feng Meng's daughter as the wife for his younger brother Shi Chongyin, whom he had adopted as a son. Shi Chongyin died early, however, and Lady Feng became widowed. (The historical sources are not in accord as to whether Feng Yu was older or younger than she was; Feng Yu's biography in the Old History of the Five Dynasties described her as a younger sister, as did her biography in the New History of the Five Dynasties; his biography in the New History of the Five Dynasties, however, described her as an older sister.)

== During Later Tang and/or early Later Jin ==
It was said that Feng Yu took the imperial examinations in the Jinshi class multiple times, but was unable to pass. When Feng Yun served as the military governor (Jiedushi) of Hedong Circuit (河東, headquartered in modern Taiyuan, Shanxi), he invited Feng Yu to serve as his secretary. Feng Yu later served as an imperial censor with the title of Jiancha Yushi (監察御史); he later served as Libu Langzhong (禮部郎中), a supervisory official at the ministry of rites (禮部, Libu); and then as an assistant to the director of salt and iron monopolies. (It is unclear whether Feng Yu's progression of offices would be still during Later Tang, or after Shi Jingtang had overthrown Later Tang and founded Later Jin as its emperor.)

== During Shi Chonggui's reign as Later Jin emperor ==
In 942, Shi Jingtang died and was succeeded as emperor by his adoptive son (biological nephew) Shi Chonggui. Shi Chonggui had long been attracted to Feng Yu's sister Lady Feng, and married her shortly after succeeding to the throne. In 943, he further created her empress. She soon became heavily involved in his governance. As the empress' brother, Feng Yu's power also rose quickly, as he became Zhongshu Sheren (中書舍人) and became in charge of drafting imperial edicts. However, as he himself lacked the necessary skills to do so, he often had another Zhongshu Sheren, Yin Peng (殷鵬), draft the edicts for him. Apparently in short order, he became the military prefect (團練使, Tuanlianshi) of Ying Prefecture (潁州, in modern Fuyang, Anhui), and then quickly promoted to be imperial scholar at Duanming Hall and deputy minister of census (戶部侍郎, Hubu Shilang), becoming often involved in Shi's policy-decision process.

Both Feng Yu and Li Yantao (李彥韜) became close associates of the emperor, and then resented the power wielded by the emperor's chief of staff (Shumishi), Sang Weihan, who was also chancellor. They therefore often defamed Sang, leading to Shi's wanting to remove Sang from his chancellor position, although Shi was dissuaded from doing so by the chancellors Li Song and Liu Xu. When Sang became aware of this, he requested to have Feng be deputy chief of staff — a request that Feng was not happy about. In response, in spring 945, Shi made Feng chief of staff as well (serving with Sang) and minister of census (戶部尚書, Hubu Shangshu), to divert some of Sang's power. In fall 945, the chancellor He Ning was removed from his post, and Feng was given the additional designations of chancellor (同中書門下平章事, Tong Zhongshu Menxia Pingzhangshi) and Zhongshu Shilang (中書侍郎). It was said that because he was particularly capable of pleasing the emperor, he became even more powerful, such that on an occasion when he was on leave due to illness, Shi stated to the other chancellors, "For all posts that are at the prefect level or greater, wait until Feng Yu returned to fill them." Feng used the emperor's trust for personal benefit, such that those who wanted posts all went to his mansion to bribe him, leading to a degradation of the Later Jin governance. (Yin, as a close associate of Feng's, also took many bribes.)

In winter 945, after Feng accused Sang of wanting to use Shi's then-illness to replace him with Shi Jingtang's biological son Shi Chongrui (石重睿) and Sang's other political enemies Li Yantao and Li Shouzhen compounding the accusations, Shi Chonggui deposed Sang and made him the mayor of the capital Kaifeng. (When Feng Yu's associates tried to argue to him that being mayor of the capital, with many minute responsibilities, was an inappropriate post for someone with Sang's accomplishments and that he should be given a military governorship, Feng stated that he was fearful that Sang might rebel. When they pointed out that Sang was a civilian and could not rebel, Feng stated, "Even if he did not rebel himself, he might encourage someone else to do so," alluding to Sang's having encouraged Shi Jingtang to rebel.)

In fall 946, there were rumors that Zhao Yanshou, a major general of Later Jin's northern neighbor Liao — whose Emperor Taizong had been instrumental in Shi Jingtang's success in overthrowing Later Tang but with whom Shi Chonggui had engaged in wars — was planning to defect to Later Jin. Feng and Li Song (who was by this point also chief of staff) believed the rumors, and had Shi Chonggui's uncle-by-marriage Du Wei the military governor of Tianxiong Circuit (天雄, headquartered in modern Handan, Hebei), write to Zhao to further entice him. At Emperor Taizong's instruction, Zhao wrote back to "confirm" his intention to do so, in order to set a trap for Later Jin forces. Shi, believing that this was time to launch a major attack against Liao, commissioned Du and Li Shouzhen to command a large army against Liao. (This was despite chancellor Zhao Ying's misgivings, pointing out that Du was always dissatisfied despite his honored position, and suggesting that Li Shouzhen be put in command alone — a suggestion that Feng and Li Song gave no heed.) However, even before Du and Li Shouzhen reached Liao territory, they were encountered by the Liao army, commanded by Emperor Taizong himself, and were surrounded at Zhongdu Bridge (中度橋, in modern Baoding, Hebei). When Emperor Taizong promised to have Du made the emperor of China instead, Du and Li Shouzhen surrendered. With them accompanying him, Emperor Taizong quickly headed for Kaifeng. With nearly the entire Later Jin imperial army having been given to Du and Li Shouzhen earlier, Kaifeng was left virtually undefended, and Shi, judging that he could not resist, surrendered, ending Later Jin. When Emperor Taizong sent the former Later Jin general Zhang Yanze into Kaifeng first to accept the surrender, the soldiers pillaged Feng's mansion and took much of the massive wealth that he had accumulated. Meanwhile, Feng tried to ingratiate both Zhang and Emperor Taizong, offering to personally surrender the Later Jin imperial seal to Emperor Taizong; Zhang declined.

== During Liao ==
Emperor Taizong of Liao ordered that Shi Chonggui and his entire family be moved to Liao territory. Among the Later Jin officials ordered to be part of Shi's train were Zhao Ying, Feng Yu, and Li Yantao. After Feng arrived at the Liao court, he was given the honorary title of Taizi Taibao (太子太保). In either 952 (according to the Old History of the Five Dynasties) or 953 (according to the New History of the Five Dynasties), by which time the Central Plains was under the rule of Later Zhou, Feng Yu's son Feng Jie (馮傑) fled from Liao and defected to Later Zhou. Feng, in fear, died not long after.

== Notes and references ==
- Old History of the Five Dynasties, vol. 89.
- New History of the Five Dynasties, vol. 56.
- Zizhi Tongjian, vols. 283, 284, 285, 286.
