= An Congjin =

An Congjin (Chinese: 安從進; died 942) was a general of the Chinese Five Dynasties and Ten Kingdoms period states Later Tang and Later Jin. In 941, he rebelled against the rule of Later Jin's founding emperor Shi Jingtang, but was defeated, and he then committed suicide.

== Background and service under Li Cunxu ==
It is not known when An Congjin was born. He was said to be of Sogdian stock, but his family had settled at the Tang dynasty's Zhenwu Circuit (振武, headquartered in Hohhot, Inner Mongolia). Both his grandfather and father (whose names were not recorded in history) were cavalry officers during Tang. At some point, An became an officer under Li Cunxu, Later Tang's founding emperor, although it is not known whether that was after Li Cunxu's founding of Later Tang or prior, perhaps during Li Cunxu's rule as the prince of Later Tang's predecessor state Jin. While serving under Li Cunxu, he reached the positions of commander of Li Cunxu's cavalry guards, as well as prefect of Gui Prefecture (貴州, in modern Guigang, Guangxi). (The latter position was a completely honorary position, as Gui Prefecture was then under the rule of Southern Han.)

== During Li Siyuan's reign ==
During the subsequent reign of Li Cunxu's adoptive brother and successor Li Siyuan, An Congjin successively served as the military governor (Jiedushi) of Baoyi (保義, headquartered in modern Sanmenxia, Henan) and Zhangwu (彰武, headquartered in modern Yan'an, Shaanxi) Circuits, but it was said that during those terms he did not conduct any campaigns.

In 933, Li Renfu, the military governor of Zhangwu's neighboring circuit, the de facto independent Dingnan Circuit (定難, headquartered in modern Yulin, Shaanxi), died. Li Renfu's son Li Yichao claimed the title of acting military governor. As the Later Tang imperial government had long suspected Li Renfu of being in secret communications with Later Tang's northern rival Khitan Empire, Li Siyuan wanted to use this chance to dislodge Li Renfu's family from Dingnan. He issued an edict commissioning Li Yichao as the acting military governor of Zhangwu and An the acting military governor of Dingnan, and had Yao Yanchou (藥彥稠) the military governor of Jingnan Circuit (靜難, headquartered in modern Xianyang, Shaanxi) command 50,000 to try to escort An to Dingnan. Li Yichao resisted the imperial edict, however, and while the Later Tang army put Dingnan's capital Xia Prefecture (夏州) under siege, the siege was unsuccessful. Eventually, after Li Yichao and his brothers begged An to relay their articulated desire to hold on to their ancestral circuit, Li Siyuan ordered An to withdraw, presumably returning him to Zhangwu.

== During Li Conghou's and Li Congke's reign ==
Li Siyuan died in 933 and was succeeded by his biological son Li Conghou the Prince of Song. An Congjin was recalled to the capital Luoyang to serve as the commander of the cavalry guards, and also given the title of military governor of Shunhua Circuit (順化, headquartered in modern Huai'an, Jiangsu). (That latter title was honorary, as Shunhua was part of Wu territory at that time.)

Li Conghou's court scene was dominated by his chiefs of staff (Shumishi) Zhu Hongzhao and Feng Yun. The two distrusted Li Siyuan's adoptive son Li Congke the Prince of Lu, who was then the military governor of Fengxiang Circuit (鳳翔, headquartered in modern Baoji, Shaanxi), and Li Siyuan's son-in-law Shi Jingtang the military governor of Hedong Circuit (河東, headquartered in modern Taiyuan, Shanxi). In early 934, they tried to dislodge Shi and Li Congke by issuing orders transferring Li Congke from Fengxiang to Hedong, Shi from Hedong to Chengde Circuit (成德, headquartered in modern Shijiazhuang, Hebei), and Fan Yanguang from Chengde to Tianxiong Circuit (天雄, headquartered in modern Handan, Hebei). Li Congke, believing that these moves were intended to target him, rebelled, and after the imperial army commanded by Wang Sitong largely mutinied against Wang and surrendered to Li Congke. Li Congke then advanced toward Luoyang. Li Conghou, panicking, considered surrendering to Li Congke, but the imperial general Kang Yicheng (康義誠) opposed and volunteered to command the remaining imperial troops against Li Congke. Li Conghou agreed, and prepared for a defense of Luoyang. As part of the defense arrangement, An was put in charge of the general patrol at Luoyang itself, but it was said that at that time, he had already received a letter from Li Congke, and was planning to submit to Li Congke; he thus assigned his close associates to positions that would allow him to act quickly in doing so. When Kang shortly after surrendered to Li Congke without a fight, Zhu committed suicide. Hearing of Zhu's death, An acted, sending his troops to Feng's mansion and slaughtered his clan. He had Zhu's and Feng's heads delivered to Li Congke. Li Conghou fled Luoyang shortly after, and at An's urging, the chancellors Feng Dao, Liu Xu, and Li Yu led the officials in welcoming Li Congke into Luoyang. Li Siyuan's wife Empress Cao shortly after declared Li Congke the new emperor. (Li Conghou was subsequently killed by emissaries sent by Li Congke.) Subsequently, in the middle of Li Congke's Qingtai era (934-937), An was commissioned the military governor of Shannan East Circuit (山南東道, headquartered in modern Xiangyang, Hubei).

== During Later Jin ==
In 936, Shi Jingtang, with aid from Khitan's Emperor Taizong, rebelled against Li Congke, and after the Later Tang forces were defeated by joint forces of Khitan and Shi's newly established Later Jin, Li Congke committed suicide, ending Later Tang and allowing Later Jin to take over its territory. Shi allowed An Congjin to remain at Shannan East, and bestowed on him the honorary chancellor designation Tong Zhongshu Menxia Pingzhangshi (同中書門下平章事).

It was said that because Shi took imperial title with Khitan aid, he himself was humiliated and therefore did not dare to act against various warlords. In addition, among the warlords themselves, some were fearful of Shi, and some believed that they, like Shi, could launch successful rebellions. After Fan Yanguang rebelled in 937, Wang Hui (王暉), an officer at Anyuan Circuit (安遠, headquartered in modern Xiaogan, Hubei), assassinated Anyuan's military governor Zhou Gui (周瓌), intending to support Fan's rebellion. When Shi subsequently sent the general Li Anquan (李安全) against Wang, Wang pillaged Anyuan's capital An Prefecture (安州) and prepared to flee to Wu. An Congjin sent his officer Zhang Fei (張朏) to try to intercept Wang, but Wang was then killed by his own subordinate Hu Jin (胡進). (The Later Jin troops subsequently put Fan under siege, and after the siege was prolonged with both sides worn out, Shi accepted Fan's surrender.)

It was said that after Fan's rebellion, An began to also consider rebelling. He often intercepted the tributes sent by Later Jin's vassal state Chu; he also received many desperate people to increase the number of his troops. His officers Wang Lingqian (王令謙) and Pan Zhilin (潘知麟) both tried to dissuade him, and he killed them. Shi wanted to move him away from Shannan East but did not dare to forcibly issue an order. When, in 940, Shi moved Wang Jianli from Pinglu Circuit (平盧, headquartered in modern Weifang, Shandong) to Zhaoyi Circuit (昭義, headquartered in modern Changzhi, Shanxi), he considered moving An from Shannan East to Pinglu. He sent a messenger to Shannan East to inquire of An, "We are leaving the post at Qing Prefecture [(青州, Pinglu's capital)] open for you, sir. If you are willing, I will issue an edict." An irreverently responded, "Move Qing Prefecture to south of the Han River, and I, your subject, will report to it." Shi did not dare to rebuke him. Meanwhile, An also tried to communicate with Meng Chang, the emperor of Later Jin's southwestern rival Later Shu, and Gao Conghui, the ruler of Later Jin's vassal state Jingnan, trying to get support from both. Meng declined to support him, on account of the distance between Shannan East and Later Shu proper, while Gao tried to dissuade him from a rebellion. Instead, An, in anger, falsely reported to Shi that Gao was considering a rebellion. Gao, at the suggestion of his general Wang Baoyi (王保義), reported the contents of An's communications with him to Shi, and offered to support the Later Jin imperial government in any action against An. An Chongrong the military governor of Chengde, who was also considering a rebellion, however, entered into an alliance with him, as both prepared for rebellion.

In winter 941, both An Congjin and An Chongrong were preparing to launch their rebellions. Believing An Chongrong to be the greater threat, Shi prepared to take an army north from then-capital Kaifeng, preparing to engage An Chongrong as soon as he rebelled, leaving his nephew Shi Chonggui the Prince of Zheng in charge at Kaifeng. As he departed Kaifeng, the chancellor He Ning pointed out that An Congjin was also about to rebel. At He's suggestion, Shi Jingtang secretly left a number of blank, but pre-signed, edicts with Shi Chonggui, to allow Shi Chonggui to commission generals against An Congjin as soon as An Congjin launched his rebellion.

An Congjin, unaware of this development, launched his rebellion shortly after, and he first attacked neighboring Weisheng Circuit (威勝, headquartered in modern Nanyang, Henan). Shi Chonggui quickly sent the imperial guard generals Zhang Cong'en (張從恩), Jiao Jixun (焦繼勳), Guo Jinhai (郭金海), and Chen Sirang (陳思讓) to command imperial guard troops toward Weisheng's capital Deng Prefecture (鄧州) to intercept An. Shortly after, he also prepared a larger army with senior general Gao Xingzhou in command, and Song Yanyun (宋彥筠) serving as Gao's deputy. Before the imperial guard generals could arrive at Deng, An, unable to capture Deng quickly, was already withdrawing toward Shannan East's capital Xiang Prefecture (襄州). Zhang intercepted him at Mount Hua (花山, in modern Zhumadian, Henan), catching him by surprise. Zhang defeated him in battle and captured his son An Hongyi (安弘義). An Congjin fled back to Xiang and prepared to defend the city. He also sent his brother An Conggui (安從貴) to attack Cai Xingyu (蔡行遇) the prefect of Jun Prefecture (均州, in modern Shiyan, Hubei). Jiao, however, intercepted and defeated An Conggui; An Conggui was captured, but Jiao cut off his feet and then released him back to Xiang, apparently to terrorize An's army.

Gao Xingzhou put Xiang Prefecture under siege for several months, until his food supplies ran out. Gao's officers Wang Qing (王清) and Liu Ci (劉詞) then led the soldiers in scaling the walls, causing the city to fall. An committed suicide with his family by fire.

== Notes and references ==
- History of the Five Dynasties, vol. 98.
- New History of the Five Dynasties, vol. 51.
- Zizhi Tongjian, vols. 278, 279, 281, 282, 283.
