= Xiao Han (Liao dynasty) =

- Traditional Chinese: 蕭翰
- Simplified Chinese: 萧翰
Transcriptions
Standard Mandarin
- Hanyu Pinyin: Xiāo Hàn
- Wade–Giles: Hsiao Han

Shulü Han
- Traditional Chinese: 述律翰
- Simplified Chinese: 述律翰
Transcriptions
Standard Mandarin
- Hanyu Pinyin: Shùlǜ Hàn
- Wade–Giles: Shu-lü Han

Courtesy name Xiao Hanzhen
- Traditional Chinese: 蕭寒真
- Simplified Chinese: 萧寒真
Transcriptions
Standard Mandarin
- Hanyu Pinyin: Xiāo Hánzhēn
- Wade–Giles: Hsiao Han-chên

Dilie
- Traditional Chinese: 敵烈
- Simplified Chinese: 敌烈
Transcriptions
Standard Mandarin
- Hanyu Pinyin: Díliè
- Wade–Giles: Ti-lieh

Xiao Han (died 949), originally named Shulü Han, courtesy name Hanzhen, childhood nickname Dilie, was a general and consort kin of the Khitan-led Liao dynasty of China. After Emperor Taizong conquered the Later Jin dynasty, Xiao was left in control of the Later Jin's former capital Daliang (now Kaifeng), but he was unable to hold it. He later plotted against Emperor Taizong's nephew and successor Emperor Shizong and was executed.

== Life ==
=== Early years ===
It is not known when Xiao Han was born. His father was Xiao Dilu (蕭敵魯)—probably still using the surname Shulü at the time—who was a chancellor of the Liao dynasty's northern court and who was a brother of the empress Shulü Ping, the wife of Khitan's first emperor Taizu and a son of Emperor Taizu's aunt. Despite this close relationship, at some point, Xiao Han's mother was put to death by Empress Shulü, causing him to resent the empress from that point on.

The earliest reference to Xiao Han's military career was in 922, when Zhang Wenli, then military governor (jiedushi) of Chengde around modern Shijiazhuang, Hebei, was under attack from the army of Khitan's southern neighbor Jin and sought Khitan aid. While the Chinese accounts were that the Jin commander Li Sizhao (adoptive cousin of Jin's prince Li Cunxu) died in battle with Zhang's army, Xiao's biography in the History of Liao contained a different narrative: that it was Xiao, whom Emperor Taizu sent to aid Zhang, who killed Li Sizhao.

In either case, after Emperor Taizu's death and succession by his son Emperor Taizong—who had married Xiao Han's sister Xiao Wen as his empress and whose sister, according to the Zizhi Tongjian, Xiao Han might have married, (although this might have been a confusion with Xiao Han's later marriage)—Xiao Han became the commander of Emperor Taizong's Han guards. By 945, Emperor Taizong had changed the name of his Khitan state to Liao and central China was ruled by Later Jin. In a battle, Emperor Taizong's army initially prevailed over Later Jin general Du Wei, but Xiao convinced Emperor Taizong to have the Liao cavalry dismount to attack Du's army with their bows and a Later Jin counterattack then caused the battle to go against Liao with heavy losses.

=== Brief control of central China ===
By the spring of 947, Emperor Taizong had entered Later Jin's capital Daliang (now Kaifeng) and taken its emperor Shi Chonggui captive. He initially declared himself the emperor of China as well, but soon tired of Han rebellions. He decided to return to Liao proper, leaving Xiao Han in charge of Daliang as the military governor (jiedushi) of Xuanwu (宣武). Xiao wanted to seize some 50 remaining Later Jin ladies-in-waiting from Zide Palace (滋德宮), but the palace's chief eunuch Zhang Huan (張環) refused. Xiao forcibly broke down the palace door and seized the women and then burned Zhang to death by holding heated iron against Zhang's body.

By the summer of 947, Emperor Taizong had died on the way back to Liao proper and had been succeeded by his nephew Yelü Ruan (posthumously known as Emperor Shizong). Xiao himself was facing increasing pressure from Han rebellions, and he considered how he could withdraw from Daliang safely, particularly with Liu Zhiyuan—who had declared himself emperor of a new state later known as the Later Han—bearing down on him. He decided to claim that Emperor Taizong had ordered him to turn over central China to Li Congyi, a prince of Later Jin's predecessor state Later Tang. He forcibly seized Li and Li's mother Consort Dowager Wang from Luoyang and had them brought to Daliang, declared Li emperor, and withdrew. Li later surrendered to Liu and was executed.

During his return to Liao proper, Xiao reached Chengde's capital Hengzhou (modern Zhengding). There, he and another Liao general, Yelü Mada (耶律麻荅), had their soldiers surround the mansion of the Han chancellor, Zhang Li, whom they both disliked. Xiao wanted to kill Zhang and, though Yelü Mada persuaded him not to, Zhang died soon thereafter in anger. Xiao then joined Emperor Shizong as the emperor was preparing to return to Liao and to confront the army of Empress Dowager Shulü, who wanted Emperor Taizong's younger brother Yelü Lihu to rule instead. As the two armies met, Empress Dowager Shulü inquired of Xiao, "What resentment do you have that you rebelled against me?" He responded, "Your subject's mother was sinless, but the Empress Dowager killed her. I cannot fail to have anger toward you." The Empress Dowager Shulü subsequently followed the advice of Yelü Wuzhi (耶律屋質) and capitulated, allowing Emperor Shizong to take the throne.

=== Death ===
In 948, Xiao married Emperor Shizong's sister Yelü Abuli (耶律阿不里). He then entered into a conspiracy against Emperor Shizong with Emperor Taizong's son Yelü Tiande (耶律天德) and Emperor Taizong's cousins Yelü Liuge (耶律劉哥) and Yelü Pendu (耶律盆都). When their plot was discovered, Yelü Tiande was executed; Yelü Liuge was exiled; and Yelü Pendu was sent as an emissary to Xiajiasi. Xiao was caned but, still swearing that he was not involved, was released. In 949, however, he and Yelü Abuli tried to write Emperor Taizu's younger brother Yelü Anduan (耶律安端) to try to persuade Yelü Anduan to join a new conspiracy. Their letter was intercepted by Yelü Wuzhi, who presented it to Emperor Shizong. As a result, Xiao was executed and Yelü Abuli was imprisoned, dying of illness while in custody.
