= An Chongrong =

Chinese general (died 942)

An Chongrong (安重榮) (died January 21, 942), nickname Tiehu (鐵胡), was a major general of the Chinese Five Dynasties and Ten Kingdoms Period state Later Jin. Late in the reign of Later Jin's founding emperor Shi Jingtang, An, discontented with the friendly relations between Later Jin and the Khitan Liao state, often provoked Liao and eventually decided to rebel against Later Jin. He was quickly defeated, however, and then was killed by his own subordinates.

== Background ==
It is not known when An Chongrong was born. His family was from Shuo Prefecture (朔州, in modern Shuozhou, Shanxi). His grandfather An Congyi (安從義) served as the prefect of Li Prefecture (利州, in modern Guangyuan, Sichuan), while his father An Quan (安全) served as the prefect of Sheng Prefecture (勝州, in modern Ordos, Inner Mongolia) and the commander of the infantry and cavalry soldiers at Zhenwu Circuit (振武, then probably headquartered in modern Hohhot, Inner Mongolia). An Chongrong himself was said to be strong and good at both archery and horsemanship.

== During Later Tang ==
During the Changxing era (930-933) of the Later Tang emperor Li Siyuan, An Chongrong served as a military commander at Zhenwu (which was then headquartered in modern Shuozhou). He had once committed an offense and was imprisoned, and then-military governor (Jiedushi) of Zhenwu, Gao Xingzhou, wanted to put him to death. An Chongrong's mother went to the Later Tang imperial government, then located at Luoyang, to appeal for his life. Li Siyuan's chief of staff An Chonghui protected An Chongrong, and An Chongrong was not put to death. It was not known what the aftermaths of that incident exactly were, but apparently at some point An Chongrong was free and became an officer at Zhenwu again.

In 936, Shi Jingtang (Li Siyuan's son-in-law), the military governor of Hedong Circuit (河東, headquartered in modern Taiyuan, Shanxi) rebelled against then-emperor Li Congke (Li Siyuan's adoptive son). He sent his officer Zhang Ying (張穎) to entice An Chongrong to join his rebellion. Both An Chongrong's older brother and mother tried to stop him from doing so, and tried to kill Zhang. However, An Chongrong persuaded his older brother and mother that if he could use two arrows to hit targets 100 steps away, they would be signs that Shi would become emperor and that he would be a military governor. He then hit the targets, so his older brother and mother allowed him to take his soldiers and join Shi's army. Shi was pleased, and promised him that he would be made a military governor. An subsequently served under Shi's general Liu Zhiyuan in defending Hedong's capital Taiyuan against the siege by the Later Tang general Zhang Jingda, whom Li Congke sent to attack Shi.

== During Later Jin ==
Shi Jingtang sought aid from Later Tang's northern rival Khitan Empire, promising to cede 16 prefectures to the north to the Khitan if the Khitan would support him as the emperor of China. Khitan's Emperor Taizong agreed and, in fall 936, arrived at Taiyuan and crushed Zhang Jingda's troops. He then declared Shi emperor of a new state of Later Jin. The joint Khitan/Later Jin forces then advanced toward Luoyang. Believing defeat to be inevitable, Li Congke committed suicide with his family, ending Later Tang. Shi entered Luoyang and took over the Later Tang lands.

During the transition from Later Tang to Later Jin, the Chengde Circuit (成德, headquartered in modern Shijiazhuang, Hebei) officer Mi Qiong (秘瓊) used the opportunity to seize control of the circuit (with Chengde's military governor Dong Wenqi (董溫琪)'s having been captured by the Khitan) while trying to aid Zhang). In spring 937, Shi commissioned An Chongrong as the military governor of Chengde and Mi as the defender of Qi Prefecture (齊州, in modern Jinan, Shandong), sending An to seize control from Mi. He also first sent the officer Wang Jingchong to Chengde's capital Zhen Prefecture (鎮州) to persuade Mi to submit, while sending the Khitan officer Zhao Siwen (趙思溫) with An to intimidate Mi. However, he secretly told An, "If Mi Qiong refuses to receive you, I will give you a different circuit. Do not forcibly seize the circuit, in case it creates other problems." This caused An to lose respect for Shi, believing that if Shi was easily intimidated by Mi — viewed by An to be an aged administrator — then he himself could more easily intimidate the emperor with his military abilities. Mi did not dare to resist An, however, and he allowed An to take control of the circuit and departed himself for Qi. (Mi was subsequently ambushed and killed by Fan Yanguang the military governor of Tianxiong Circuit (天雄, headquartered in modern Handan, Hebei), as Fan had unsuccessfully tried to persuade Mi into a joint rebellion against Later Jin and feared that Mi would leak the news, and was also enticed by the wealth — which Mi gained by killing Dong's family and seizing Dong's wealth — that Mi was carrying.)

At Chengde, An was said to be diligent — whereas the other military governors of the time often took bribes and ruled according to the amount of bribes they received, An was attentive to the administration of laws and often used logic in ruling on cases. His subordinates therefore also did not dare to receive bribes. There was one occasion when a couple was claiming that their son was not filially pious. An gave the father a sword and said, "Kill him yourself." The father wept and stated, "I do not have the heart to do so." The mother cursed at the father and took the sword herself, chasing the father away. An, finding this illogical, inquired further, and found out that she was a stepmother, not the son's birth mother. He chased her out and then shot her to death with an arrow. This much impressed the people of the realm, and he initially enjoyed popularity. As a result, however, he became arrogant, and he began to gather troops, believing that he could seek the throne (just as Li Congke and Shi did), stating, "The Son of Heaven's throne is based on those who have strong armies and healthy horses, not based on preordination." However, the people began to see him as overly harsh when, on one occasion, he, out of anger, killed his officer Jia Zhang (賈章) on false excuse of Jia's committing treason, and slaughtered Jia's entire household, except for Jia's daughter. Jia's daughter, however, did not want to live alone, and sought to share her father's fate, so he killed her as well.

Part of the territory that Shi ceded to the Khitan (which, by this point, has renamed their state Liao) included territory inhabited by the Tuyuhun tribespeople. The Tuyuhun were mistreated by the Liao. An enticed them to join his army, and so large Tuyuhun contingents fled to his territory in or about 940. Subsequently, Emperor Taizong angrily rebuked Shi, and Shi, under Liao pressure, forcibly expelled the Tuyuhun and sent them back to Liao.

This aggravated An, who had long been (at least publicly) ashamed of how Shi had submitted to Emperor Taizong, not only as subject, but also titularly as son. (However, despite public protestations against Liao, he was also in secret communications with the Liao military governor of Lulong Circuit (盧龍, headquartered in modern Beijing), Liu Xi (劉唏).) He himself was arrogant to Liao emissaries whenever they passed through Chengde, and, if they were particularly distasteful to him, would kill them. In 941, he submitted a lengthy, public petition to Shi, in which he urged, in harsh terms, the repudiation of the alliance with Liao. He also wrote letters with similar contents to the important officials at the imperial court and the military governors throughout the Later Jin realm. Shi's advisor Sang Weihan, then the military governor of Taining Circuit (泰寧, headquartered in modern Jining, Shandong), wrote him and suggested that he (Shi) head to Yedu (鄴都, Tianxiong's capital) and take up court there, so that he could react quickly if An did rebel. Shi did so. Once he reached Yedu, he wrote An, stating:

You are an honored official. You have a mother at home. Why is it that, in anger, you do not think of the troubles you may cause, and think of neither your sovereign and mother? I gained the realm because of the Khitan. You gained honor and wealth because of me. Why do you forget this? I serve the Khitan even though I have the entire realm. How can you resist them with just one circuit? You should carefully think about this, so that you do not regret this in the future.

The letter, however, did not change An's mind, and he became even more arrogant. He also heard that An Congjin the military governor of Shannan East Circuit (山南東道, headquartered in modern Xiangyang, Hubei) was also planning to rebel against Shi, and therefore sent secret messengers establishing an alliance with An Congjin.

At the same time, Shi sent Liu Zhiyuan to Hedong to serve as its military governor, to also monitor the situation with An. Liu enticed the Tuyuhun chieftain Bai Chengfu (白承福), who had previously submitted to An Chongrong, into joining the Hedong army with his tribesmen. That, and the failure of Dada and Qibi (契苾) tribesmen to join An Chongrong (as he had claimed that they would), hampered the impact of An's public pronouncements.

Nevertheless, when An Congjin shortly after rebelled against Later Jin, An Chongrong resolved to rebel anyway. Shi sent his brother-in-law Du Chongwei against An Chongrong, with Ma Quanjie (馬全節) serving as Du's deputy. When the armies encountered each other, An's officer Zhao Yanzhi (趙彥之) surrendered to Du (although he was nevertheless killed after the surrender), causing a general rout of An's army. An fled back to Zhen and took up defense there. In spring 942, a Chengde officer opened a water gate and allowed Du's army into the city, and An was captured and executed. Shi had An's head painted (for preservation) and delivered it to Emperor Taizong.

== Notes and references ==
- Old History of the Five Dynasties, vol. 98.
- New History of the Five Dynasties, vol. 51.
- Zizhi Tongjian, vols. 280, 281, 282, 283.
