= Lingyin Temple =

Buddhist temple in Hangzhou, China

Lingyin temple
- 灵隐寺
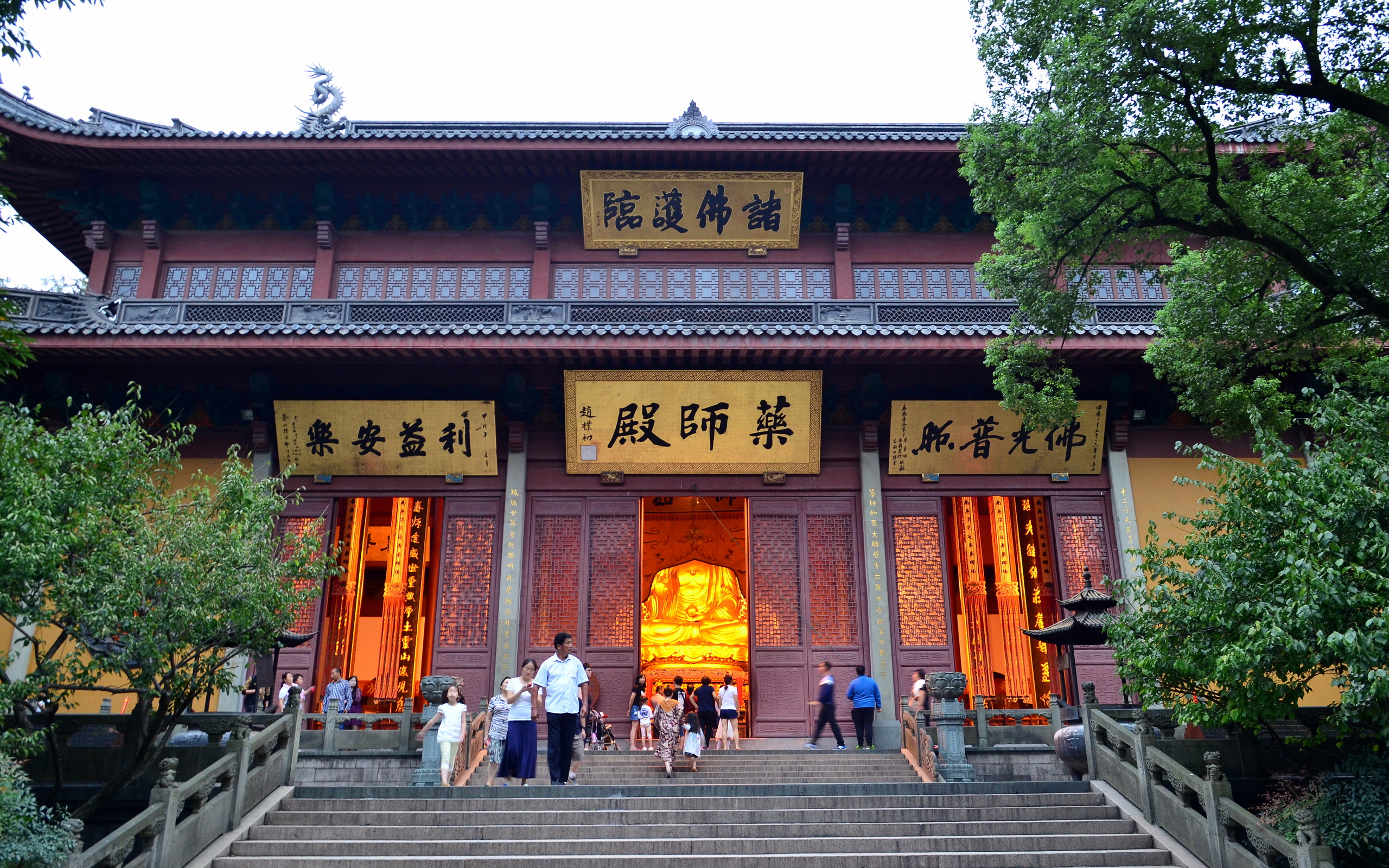
- Hall of Bhaisajyaguru in the Temple

- Location within Zhejiang Location within China

Religion
- Affiliation: Buddhism
- Sect: Chan Buddhism
- Leadership: Shi Guangquan (释光泉)

Location
- Location: Hangzhou, Zhejiang
- Country: China
- Interactive map of Lingyin temple
- Coordinates: 30°14′34″N 120°05′48″E

Architecture
- Style: Chinese architecture
- Founder: Huili
- Established: 328; 1698 years ago
- Completed: Qing dynasty (reconstruction)

Website
- www.lingyinsi.org

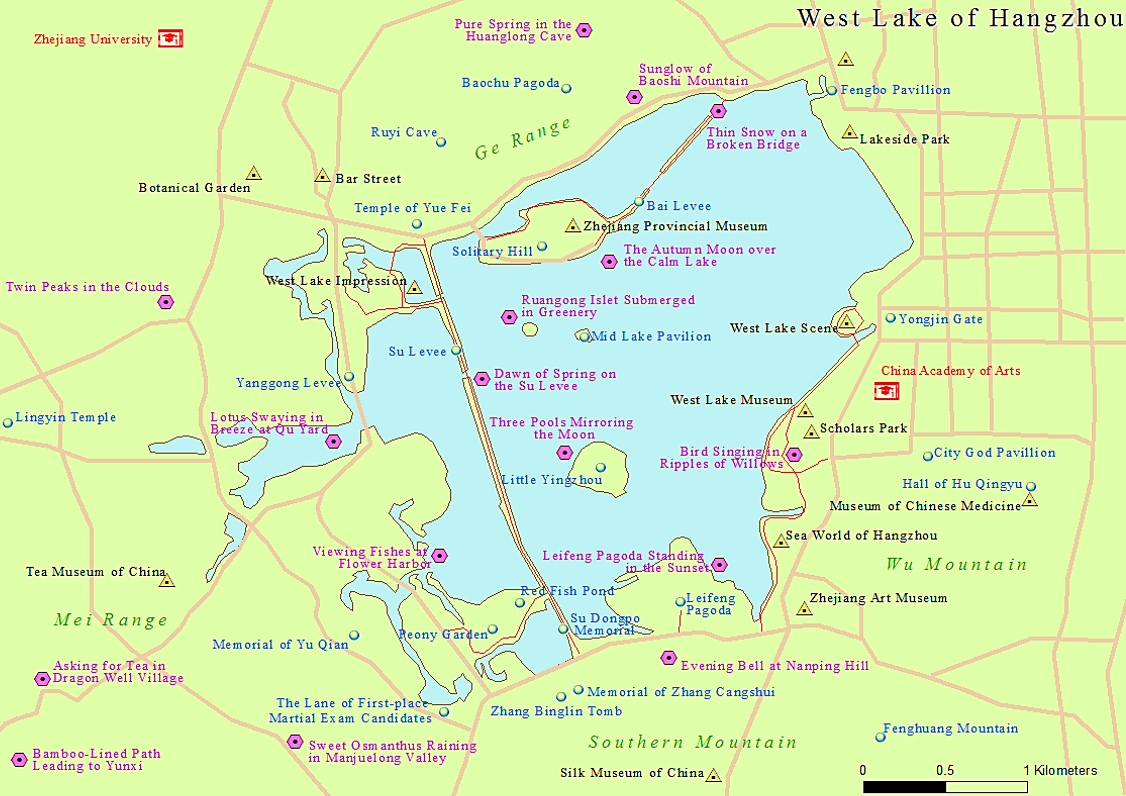
Map of the West Lake in Hangzhou, China, with the location of Lingyin Temple

Buddhist monks chanting at Lingyin Temple, Hangzhou, October 2010.

Lingyin Temple (simplified Chinese: 灵隐寺; traditional Chinese: 靈隱寺; pinyin: Língyǐn Sì) is a prominent Chan Buddhist temple near Hangzhou that is renowned for its many pagodas and grottos. Its name is commonly and literally translated into English as Temple of the Soul's Retreat.

The monastery is the largest of several temples in the Wulin Mountains (Chinese: 武林山; pinyin: Wǔlínshān), which feature renowned grottos and religious rock carvings.

== History ==
According to tradition, the monastery was founded in 328 AD during the Eastern Jin dynasty (266–420) by an Indian monk, named Huili in Chinese. From its inception, Lingyin was a famous monastery in the Jiangnan region. At its peak under the Wuyue Kingdom (907–978), the temple boasted 18 pavilions, 72 halls, more than 1300 dormitory rooms, inhabited by more than 3000 monks. Many of the rich Buddhist carvings in the Feilai Feng grottos and surrounding mountains also date from this era.

During the Southern Song (1127–1279), the monastery was regarded as one of the ten most important temples of the Chan sect in the Jiangnan region. However, its prominence has not saved the temple from marauders. It has been rebuilt no less than sixteen times since then. While certain existing buildings date from previous Chinese dynasties, much of the current buildings are modern restorations from the late Qing (1644–1911) period.

Over the course of the Cultural Revolution, the temple and grounds suffered damage from Hangzhou's Red Guards but the planned destruction of the temple in 1966 was successfully stopped by locals and students from Zhejiang University, who had been shocked and galvanized by the Guards' ransacking of the patriotic general Yue Fei's tomb. Subsequently, the temple was offered a measure of protection by direct instructions from Premier Zhou Enlai.

Today the temple is thriving as a destination for both pilgrims and tourists. It is regarded as one of the wealthiest monasteries in China, and regular pilgrims have included former paramount leader Deng Xiaoping.

== Surroundings ==
The Wuling Mountains are a renowned site for Chan Buddhism in Southern China. A number of smaller temples are also located in the area. Today, Lingyin and the surrounding areas are marketed as the Lingyin-Feilai Feng Scenic Area, with ticketed admission. Visitors enter from a screen wall marked with a four character inscription "the Western Heaven is within reach" (咫尺西天; zhíchǐ Xītiān; 'Western Heaven is between 0.8 and one foot away'). Proceeding down the road from the entrance, the visitor first sees Feilai Feng on the left, then Lingyin Hill on the right. The entire scenic area is dotted with historic buildings and artwork, including pagodas, pavilions, bridges, and statues. The largest stone pagoda is located near the entrance. Called Elder Li's Pagoda (Chinese: 理公塔), it houses the ashes of Huili. The area is thickly wooded.

== Feilai Feng grottos ==
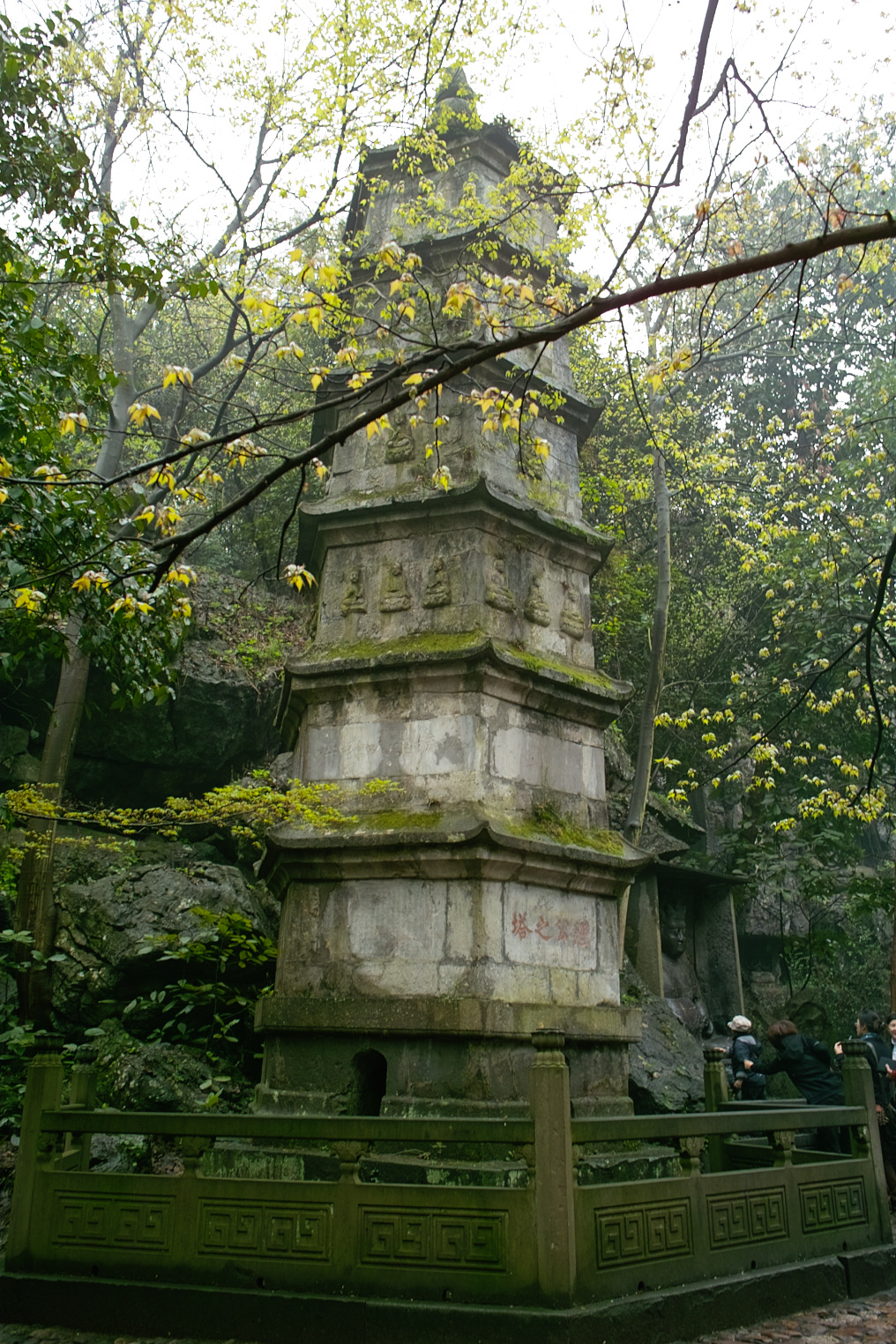
Pagoda containing Huili's ashes at the foot of Feilai Feng.

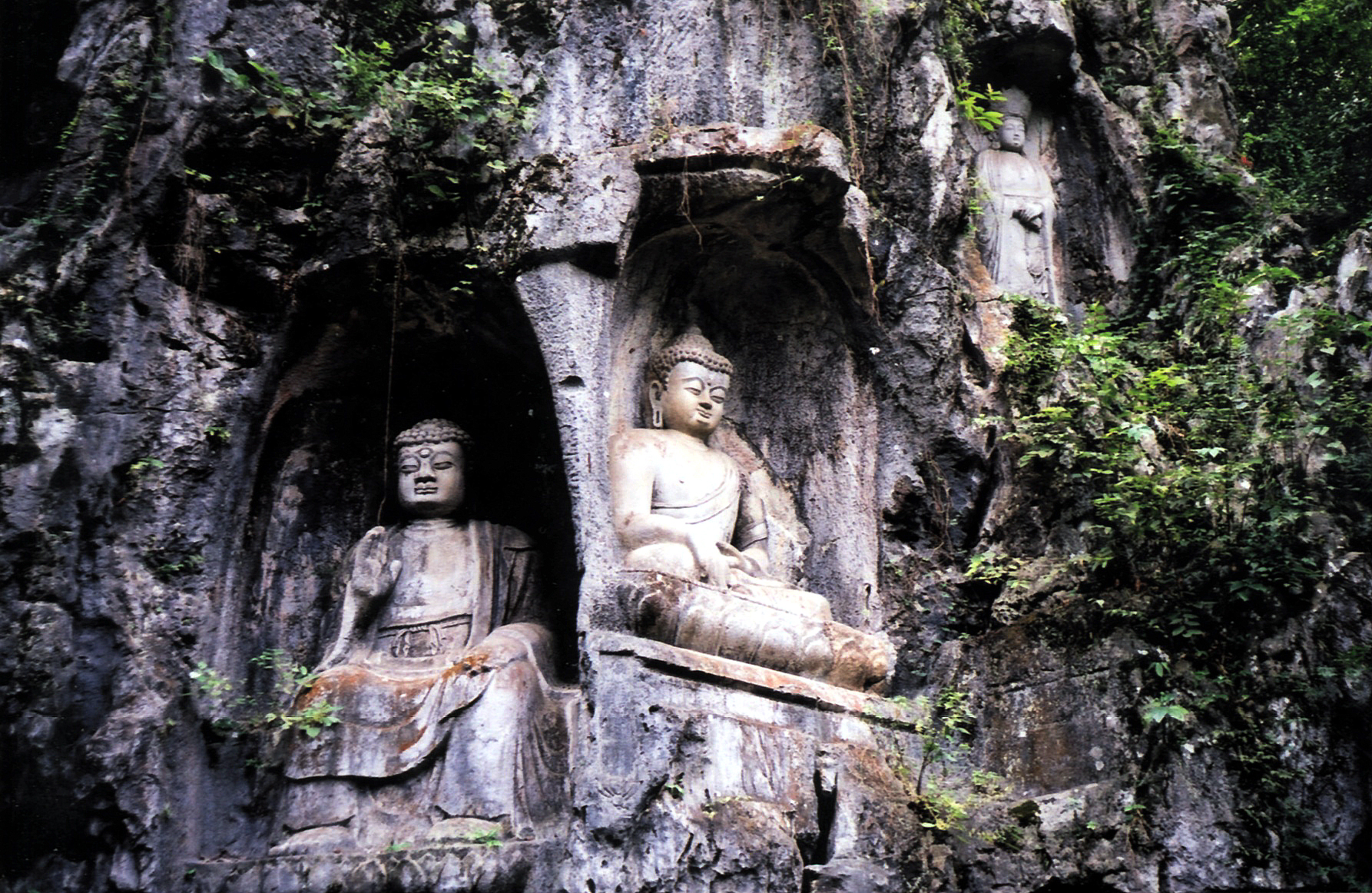
Feilai Feng grottos

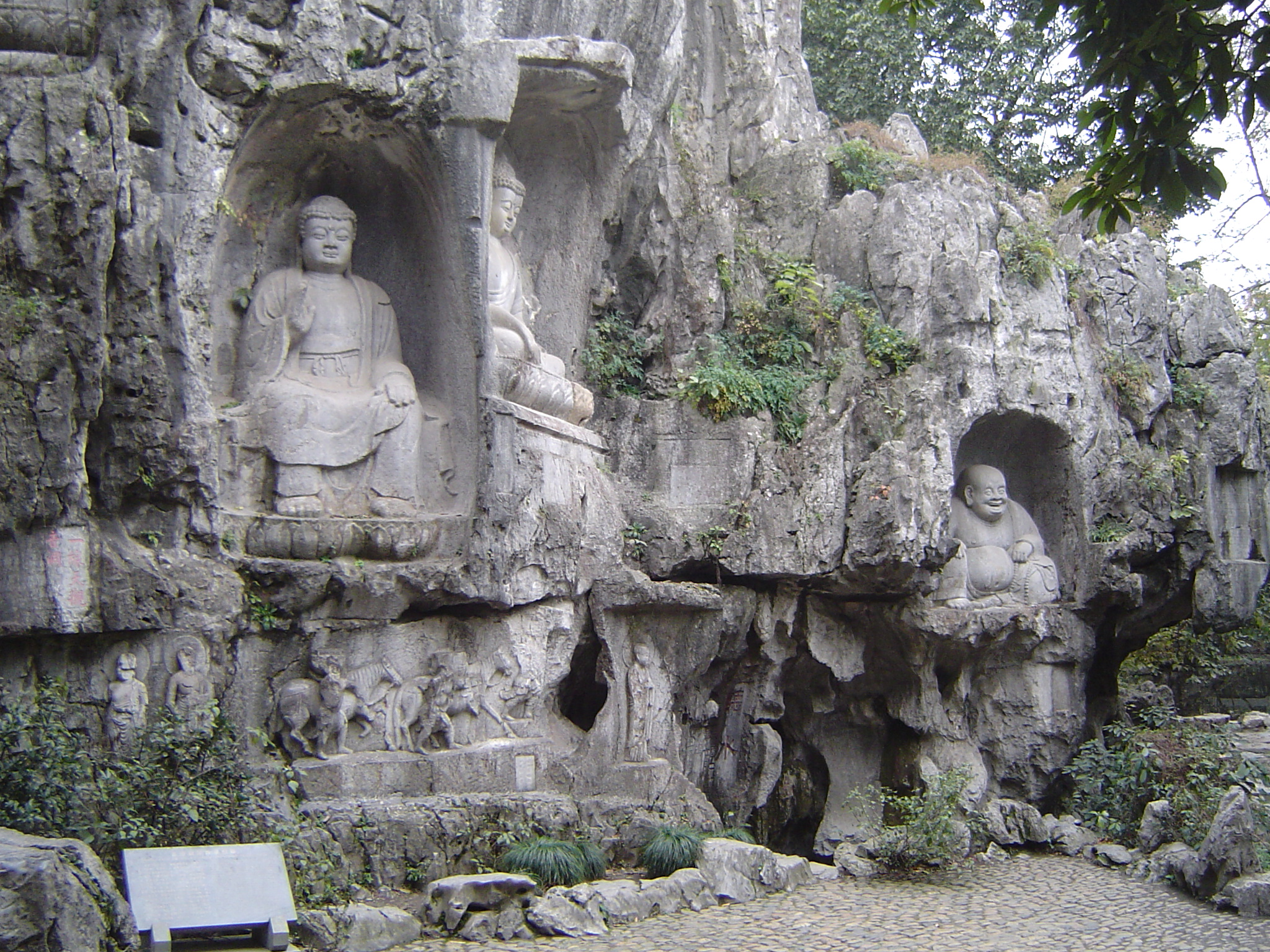
Rock reliefs at Feilai Feng; the panel at lower left depicts the pilgrims of the Journey to the West

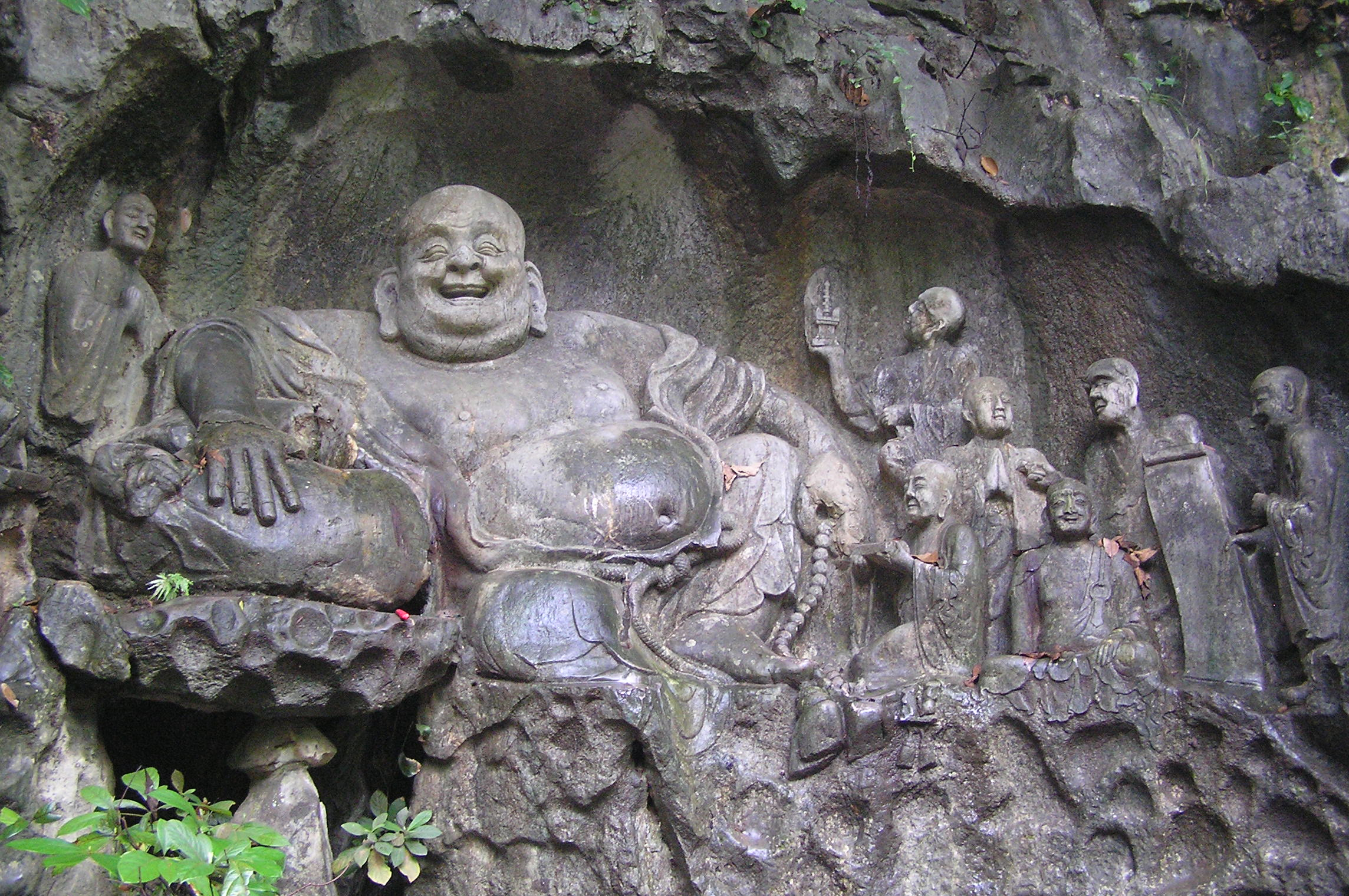
Relief of Budai as the bodhisattva Mi Le, with disciples

Feilai Feng, or "the Peak that Flew Hither", also commonly translated as "Flying Peak" (Traditional Chinese: 飛來峰石窟; Simplified Chinese: 飞来峰石窟), is located in front of the temple proper. The peak is so-named because it is made of limestone, giving it a craggy appearance very different from the surrounding mountains. Legend holds that the peak was originally from India (with some versions suggesting that it is Vulture Peak), but flew to Hangzhou overnight as a demonstration of the omnipotence of Buddhist law. Many grottos can be found on the peak, such as Qinglin Grotto, Yuru Grotto and Longhong Grotto. Many rock reliefs dot the peak surface, and more are located in the various caves and grottos throughout the peak. Within the main cave, dedicated to the bodhisattva Guanyin, there is a crack in the ceiling of the cave that stretches up to the surface, so that a person standing at a certain position can see a sliver of sunlight. This is known as the "one thread of heaven" (Traditional Chinese: 一線天; Simplified Chinese: 一线天; Pinyin: Yīxiàn Tiān).

The stone carvings on Feilai Feng are located in an area measuring 600 meters long and 200 meters wide. In total, there are 153 shrines and more than 470 pieces of carvings, among which 338 are relatively well-preserved, 96 carvings from the Yuan Dynasty as well as several from the Ming Dynasty.

Around 11 carvings date to the late Tang Dynasty and Five Dynasties and Ten Kingdoms Period. These carvings dot the top of the peak and the mouth of Qinglin Grotto and they all prominently feature the “Three Saints of the West”, which refers to the triad of the Buddha Amituofo and the Bodhisattvas Guanyin and Dashizhi from Pure Land Buddhism.

A total of 222 carvings were produced in the Northern Song Dynasty period, which feature a diverse range of Buddhist figures including the Six Patriarchs of Chan (or Zen) Buddhism, various arhats, Bodhisattvas and Buddhas such as Vairocana. One of the more prominent carvings from this period is a shrine to Budai, a monk who is traditionally regarded as an incarnation of Mi Le, surrounded by the Eighteen Arhats. This shrine stands at 3.6 meters high and 9.9 meters long, making it the largest shrine on Feilai Feng.

Most of the nearly 100 carvings produced during the Yuan Dynasty are located on the southern bank of Lengquan Stream and on the cliff near Qinglin Grotto and Yuru Grotto. The carvings from this period resembles the art styles of the Tang and Song dynasties, while also reflecting influences from Tibetan and Mongolian art.

== Architecture ==
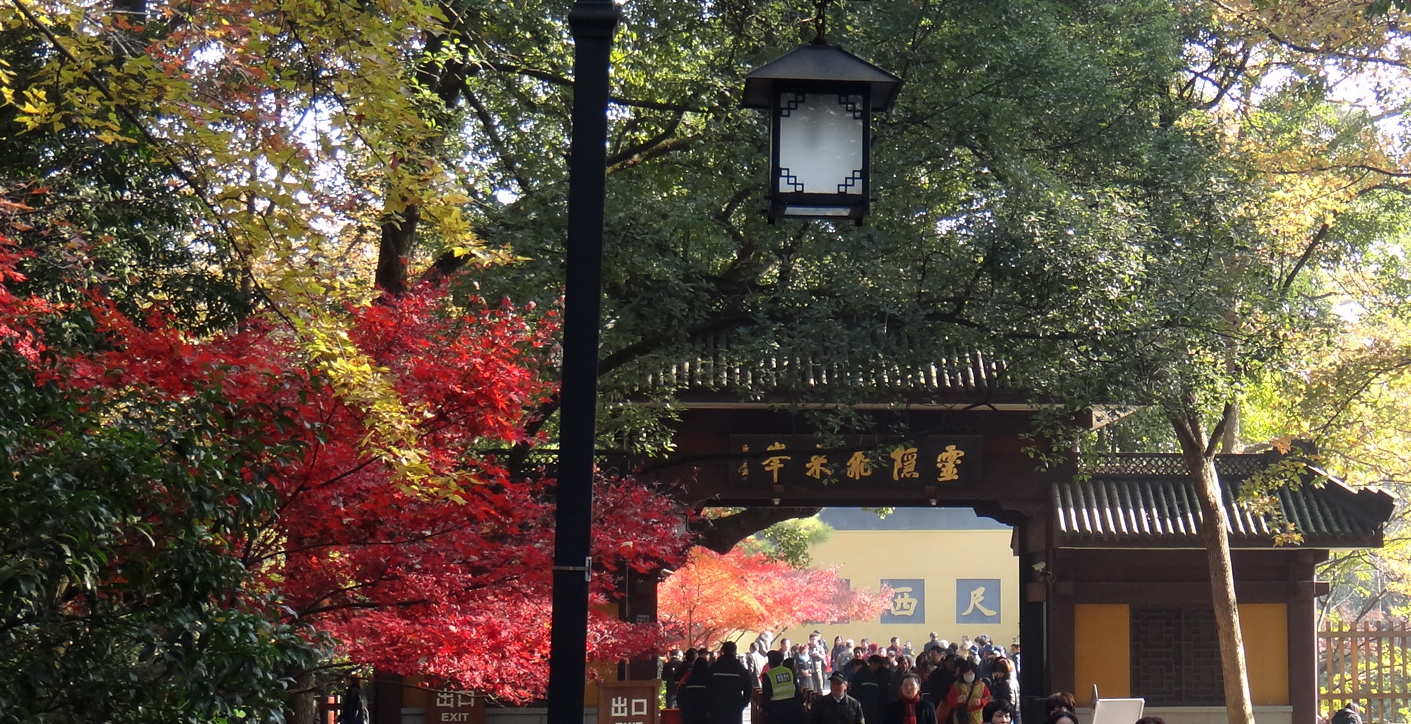
Shanmen of the temple

The main axis of Lingyin follows a traditional Song dynasty five-hall Chan sect structure. The main axis stretches up the Lingyin Hill. However, the five-hall axis is a recent recreation. Only the front three halls are a part of the Qing dynasty axis.

=== Tianwang Dian ===
The formal entrance of the temple is the Tianwang Dian, or Hall of the Four Heavenly Kings. This hall is a double-eaved building. The front of the building carries a plaque (雲林禪寺; Yúnlín Chán Sì; 'Chan temple of the Clouds and Forests'), written by the Kangxi Emperor. The principal statue in this hall is that of the Buddha of the future, Mi Le, in his manifestation as Budai, or the Laughing Buddha. At the back, facing up the hill, is the dharmapala Weituo. This statue dates from the Southern Song Dynasty. Being 800 years old this is the oldest and most important statue in the temple. Arranged along the left and right are the Four Heavenly Kings. The ceiling is ornately painted and decorated with phoenixes and dragons.

The statues of Four Heavenly Kings are imposing. Visitors to the temple are often impressed by the size and majesty of the entrance hall and its statues of the heavenly kings. Indeed, the Tianwang Dian at Lingyin Temple is as large or larger than the main hall at many temples, reflecting its status as the center of Buddhism in Southern China.

The Tianwang Dian is the formal entrance to the temple. However, this entry has been closed in recent years, with visitors funneled instead through side doors, where separate ticket offices are set up for admission to the temple.

=== Mahavira Hall ===
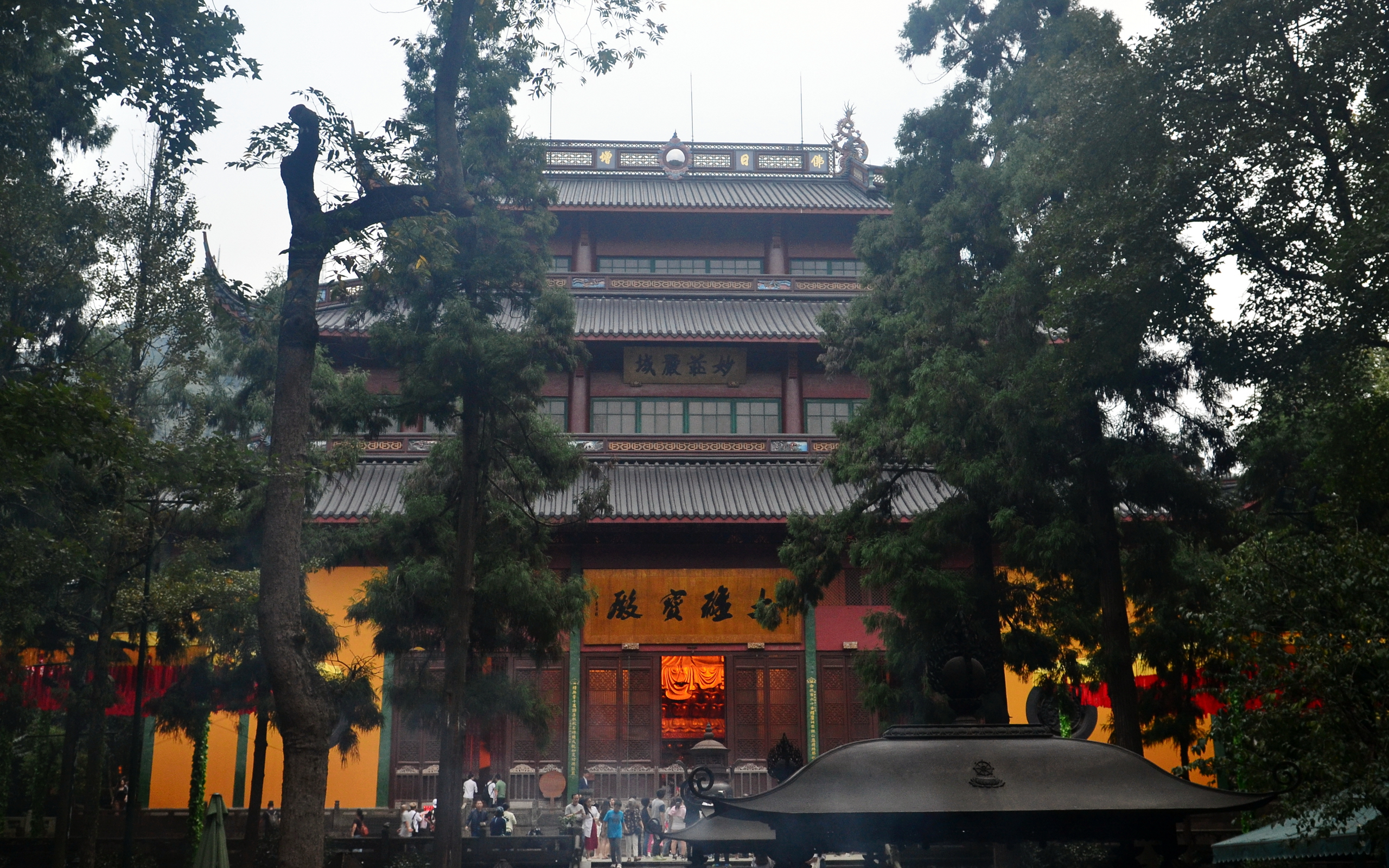
The Mahavira Hall

The second and principal hall is the Mahavira Hall (also referred to as the Grand Hall of the Great Sage). It is separated from the Hall of the Heavenly Kings by a large courtyard, featuring a raised lawn bordered with trees. To the left of the courtyard stands the Luohan Tang, or Hall of the Five Hundred Arhats. The Mahavira Hall stands at 33.6 meters tall and has a roof that is triple-eaved. The interior of the hall reaches about 30 meters, with a gold-painted ceiling featuring bas-relief images of traditional Buddhist symbols.

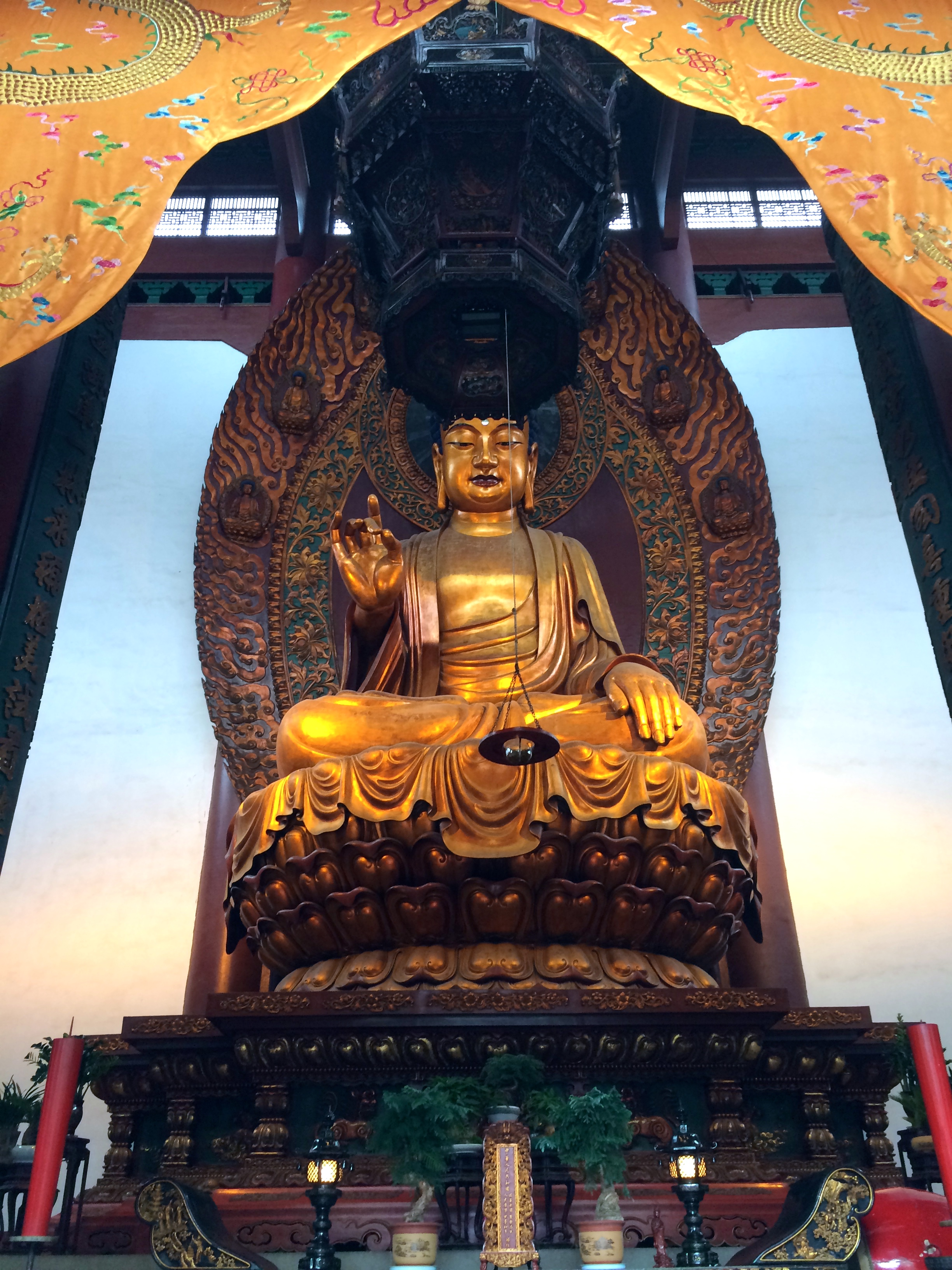
The Shijiamoni Buddha statue at the Mahavira Hall.

The main statue enshrined within this hall is one of Shijiamouni, the historical Buddha, with his right hand forming the vitarka mudrā. The present statue was carved in 1956 from camphor wood in Tang dynasty style and coated with 60 taels of gold. At 24.6 meters high (including the throne on which the statue sits), it is the largest wooden Buddhist statue in China. Arranged along each side of the hall are statues of the Twenty-Four protective deities of Chinese Buddhism, their hands carrying various Buddhist instruments of salvation as well as weapons. Statues of the Eighteen arhats and other prominent Buddhist figures, such as the Bodhisattva Zhunti, line the walls of the hall as well.

Behind the hall are twelve statues of various different bodhisattvas lining each wall, with six of each side. The statues include those of Wenshu (Manjusri), Puxian (Samantabhadra), Mi Le (Maitreya) and Jingangzang (Vajragarbha).

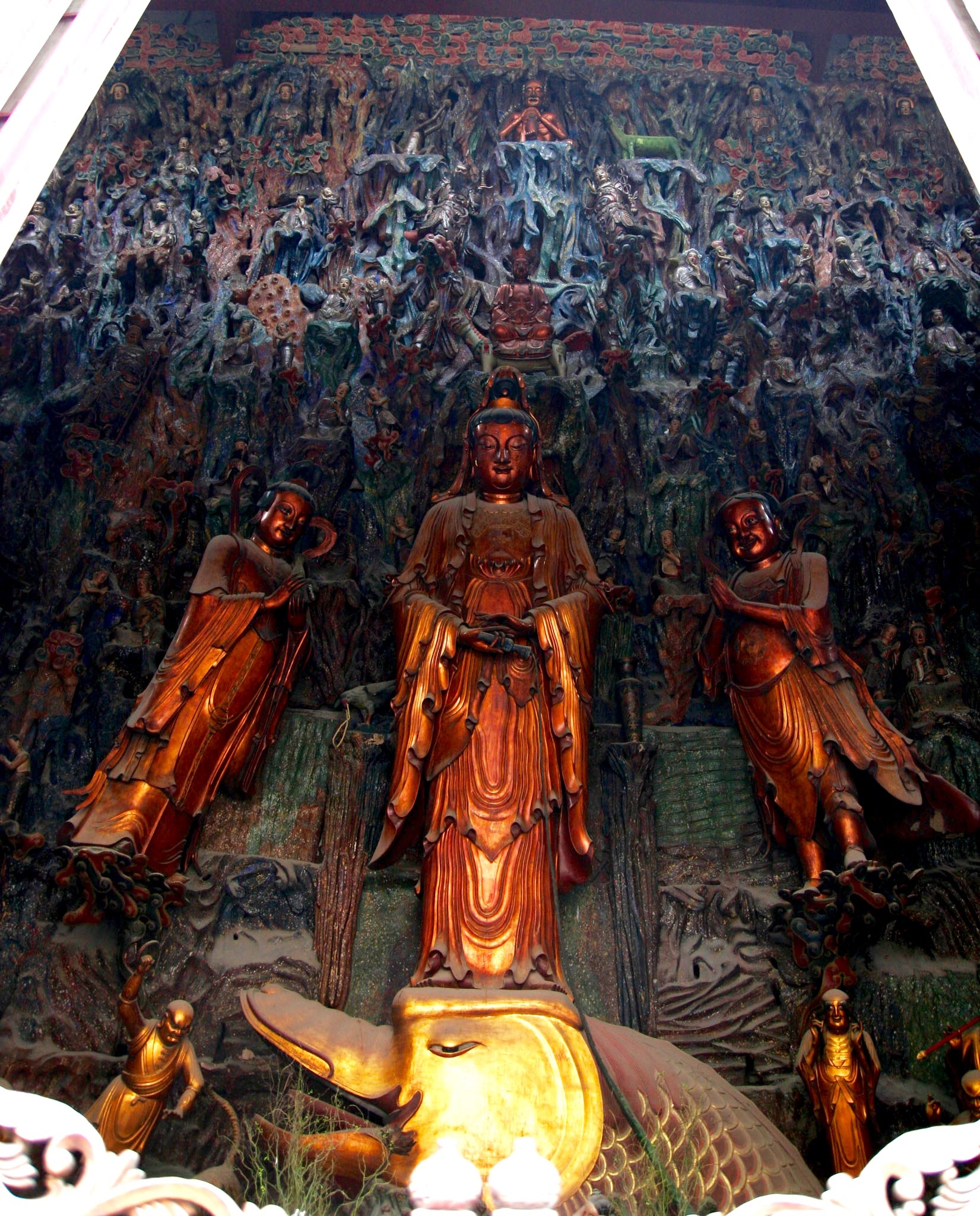
Panorama enshrining a main statue of Guanyin, a manifestation of the Bodhisattva Avalokiteśvara, at the back of the Mahavira Hall

At the rear wall of the hall is a panorama depicting the penultimate chapter of the Avatamsaka Sutra, centering on Shancai (Chinese: 善財童子; pinyin: Shàncáitóngzǐ). In the chapter, Shancai, in pursuit of enlightenment, goes on a pilgrimage to 53 different spiritual teachers (ranging from non-Buddhists to Bhikkhunīs to kings to devas to Bodhisattvas). The central statue of the panorama is one of the Bodhisattva Guanyin (one of the 53 teachers). Statues of Shancai and Longnü stand at both sides of this statue. The rest of the panorama behind the three main statues consists of more than 150 clay sculptures depicting the other spiritual teachers of Sudhana as well as other Buddhist figures such the main characters of Journey to the West, the Four Heavenly Kings and Ji Gong. Figures of the Bodhisattva Dizang and Shijiamoni Buddha (depicting his cultivation prior to becoming the Buddha) are also incorporated into the top and middle portions of the panorama respectively.

=== Yaoshi Dian ===
Further uphill and behind the main hall is the Yaoshi Dian, or the Hall of Bhaisajyaguru (藥師殿; Yàoshī Diàn), housing a statue of the Buddha Yaoshi, commonly called the Medicine Buddha. Statues of the Bodhisattvas Riguang and Yueguang, who are traditionally regarded as the attendants of Yaoshi, stand on the left and right side of Yaoshi's statue respectively.

Twelve statues of the Twelve Heavenly Generals, who are protective yaksha attendants of Bhaisajyaguru, stand on both sides of the Hall of Bhaisajyaguru, with 6 situated on each side. The names of each General along with their associated iconography are: Kumbhira (armed with a yellow vajra), Vajra (armed with a white sword), Mihira (armed with a yellow vajra), Andira (armed with a green mallet), Anila (armed with a red trident), Sandila (armed with a black sword), Indra (armed with a red staff or halberd), Pajra (armed with a red mallet), Makura (armed with a white ax), Kinnara (armed with a yellow rope), Catura (armed with a green mallet), and Vikarala (armed with a red three-pointed vajra).

=== Jigong Dian ===
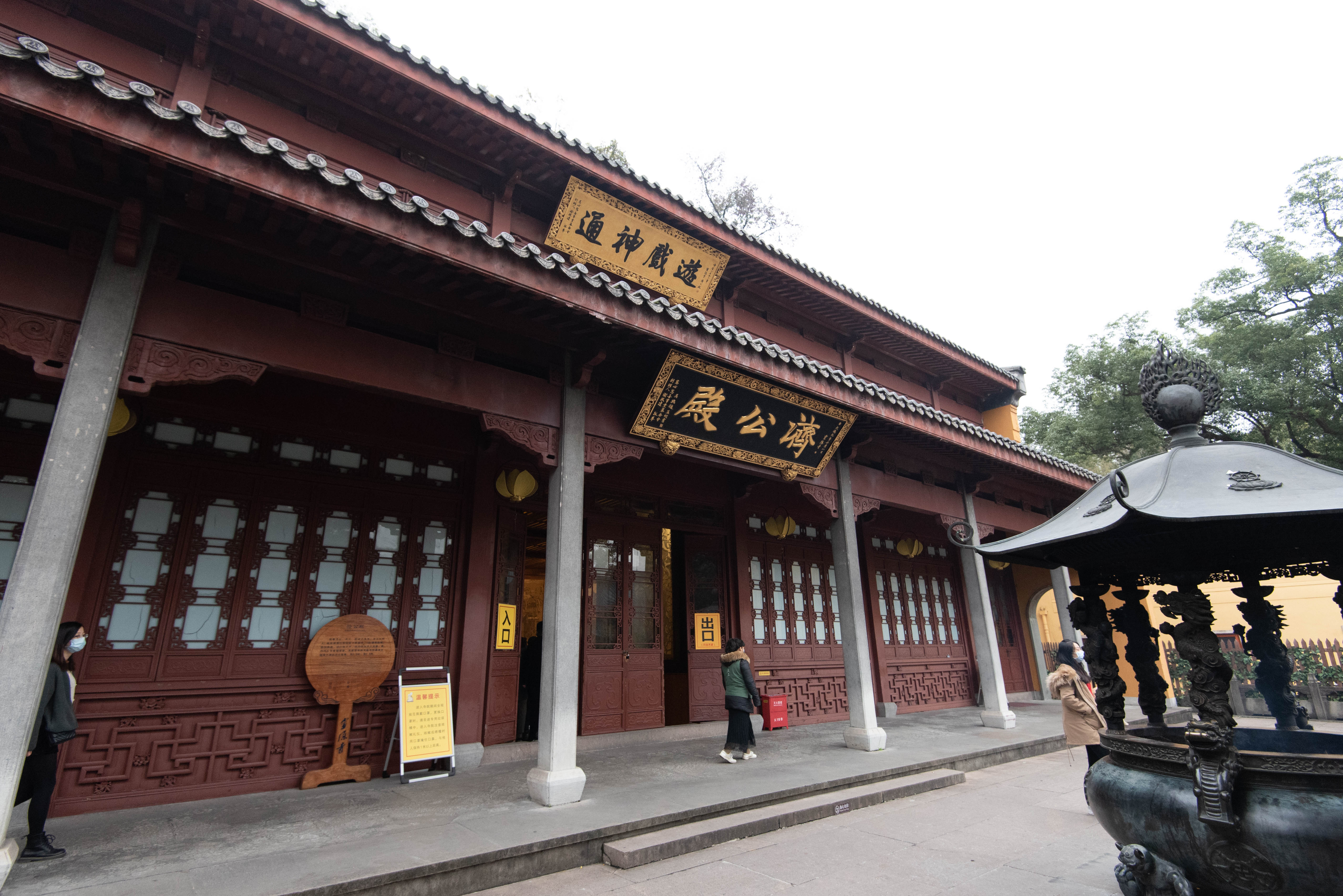
The Hall of Ji Gong

The Jigong Dian, or the Hall of Ji Gong, is situated to the east of the Yaoshi Dian and enshrines a statue of the Song dynasty monk Ji Gong (also known as "Daoji"). The statue is made of bronze, with a height of 2.3 meters and a weight of 2.5 tons. The right hand of the statue holds a broken fan, the left hand carries Buddhist prayer beads, and the right foot is shown dipping into a wine jar. Eighteen huge murals depicting a narration of Ji Gong's life are painted on the walls at both sides of the hall. Each mural is 3 meters high and 3 meters long, with the entire display being 50 meter long.

=== Fatang ===
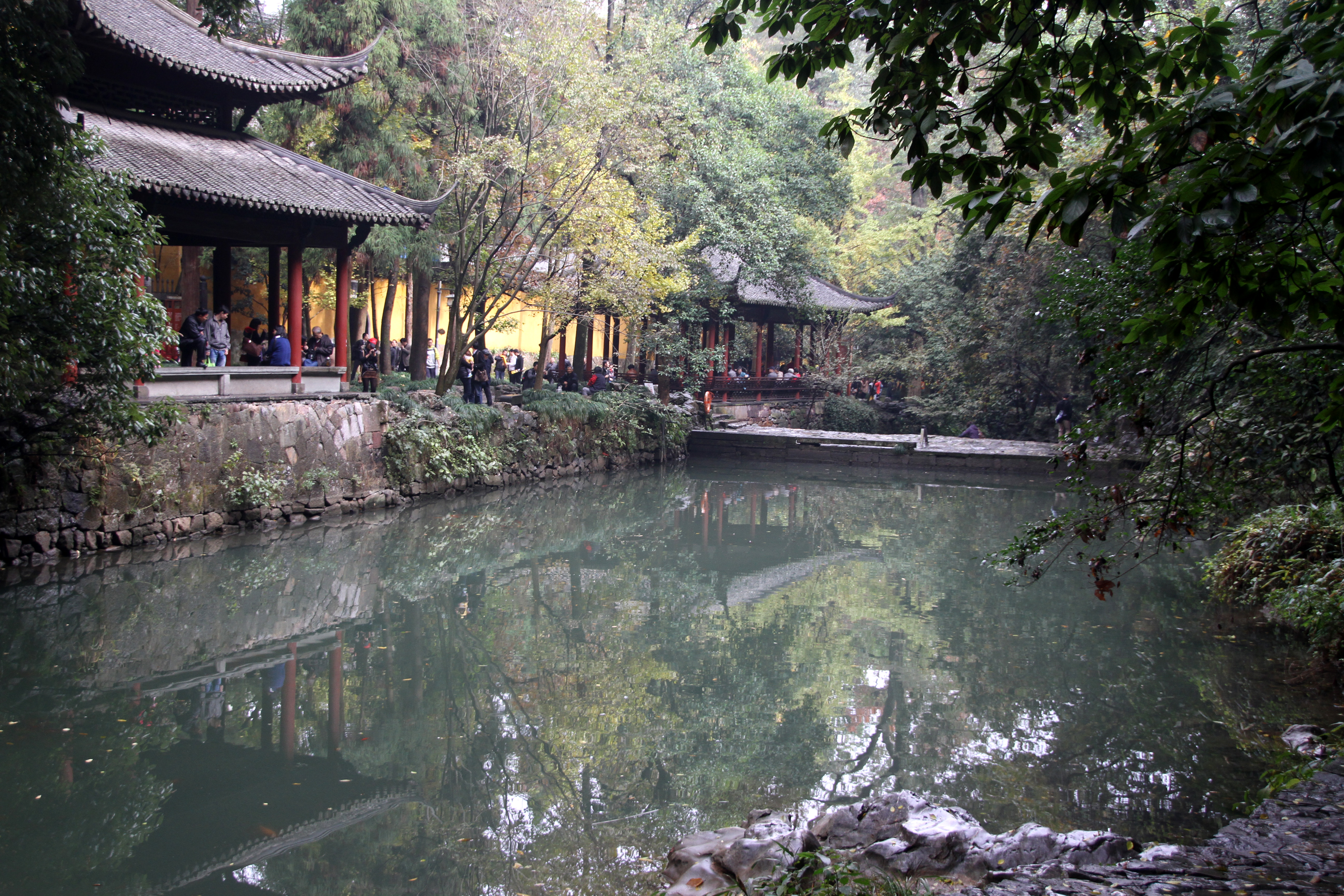
Free Life Pond of the temple

The Fatang, or Dharma Hall, is located behind the Yaoshi Dian and is the main place where the Buddhist sutras are expounded by the resident monastics. The present Dharma Hall building was constructed by a monk from the temple named Xuanli in 1446.

=== Cultural Relics Exhibition Hall ===
The Cultural Relics Exhibition Hall lies on the basement floor of the Dharma Hall and displays the collection of Buddhist cultural relics maintained by the temple.

The hall covers a total area of 638 square meters and is installed with waterproof, fireproof, damp-proof, electronic surveillance and air-conditioning systems. It houses an exhibition of over 40 showcases with collections of cultural relics that have been treasured by the temple for many years. These cultural relics are categorized by the temple into four categories: first, Buddhist ritual implements used by successive abbots of Lingyin Temple, such as horsetail whisks and ruyi scepters; second, common antiques such as porcelain vases from the Southern Song Dynasty; third, Buddhist antiques such as sutras written by Tang dynasty Chinese Buddhists and unearthed Buddhist statues; fourth, ancient paintings and calligraphy, such as calligraphy scrolls in seal characters by Wu Changshuo, fan paintings by Ren Bonian and couplets by Sha Menghai.

=== Zangjing Ge ===
Uphill from the Hall of the Medicine Buddha is the Zangjing Ge, or the Tower of Buddhist Texts. This, and the Huayan Dian behind it, were built from 2000 to 2002 to recreate the five-hall main axis. The Zangjing Ge does not house a major statue and is not open for worship.

=== Huayan Dian ===
The fifth and last hall on the main axis is the Huayan Dian, or the Huayan (Avatamsaka) Hall (华严殿; Huáyán Diàn). Also built in 2002, this hall houses statues of the three sages of the Avatamsaka Sutra, known as the Huayan Sutra in Chinese – Shijiamoni, Wenshu, and Puxian.

A 3 meter high bronze statue of the Japanese Buddhist monk Kūkai, who traveled to China during the Tang Dynasty to study Chinese Esoteric Buddhism and who visited Lingyin Temple during his travels, stands in a bamboo grove between the Fatang and the Huayan Dian. The statue portrays Kūkai in monastic robes, holding Buddhist prayer beads in his left hand, and a walking stick in his right hand. The statue was erected in 2002 as a symbol of the friendship between Buddhist circles in both China and Japan.

=== Luohan Tang ===
The Luohan Tang, or the Hall of Five Hundred Arhats (五百羅漢堂; Wǔbǎi Luóhàn Táng), also a modern addition, faces onto the western side of the courtyard in front of the main hall. The building has a complex floor plan, shaped like a Buddhist swastika. Bronze statues of the five hundred arhats are arranged along the arms of the swastika, with each statue seated on a unique ornate seat. Each statue measures 1.7 meters in height, 1.3 meters in width, and weighs around 1 ton.

At the center of the hall, where the arms of the swastika join, stands a bronze canopy housing statues of the four main bodhisattvas in Chinese Buddhism: Guanyin, Dizang, Wenshu and Puxian, who represent the four cardinal directions. This canopy is 12.62 meters in height, 7.77 meters wide and occupies 5 square meters. It is currently the tallest solid bronze structure in the world.

=== Two Sutra Pillars ===
The two sutra pillars are located in the eastern and western sides of the Hall of the Four Heavenly Kings. The eastern pillar stands at 7.17 meters high and the western pillar stands at 11 meters high. Both pillars are engraved with the Uṣṇīṣa Vijaya Dhāraṇī Sūtra, as well as reliefs of various Buddhist figures and tales. Both pillars were built in the year 969 in the state of Wuyue during the end of the Five Dynasties and Ten Kingdoms Period and the beginning of the Song Dynasty and were moved to their present location in the temple in the year 1053.

== Notable monks ==
- Huili – An Indian monk who founded the temple
- Daoji – A saintly Buddhist monk who is highly venerated in Chinese folk religion and popularly known as "Ji Gong".
- Dachuan Lingyin Puji (1179–1253) – compiler of the Wudeng Huiyan (Compendium of Five Lamps)

== Gallery ==
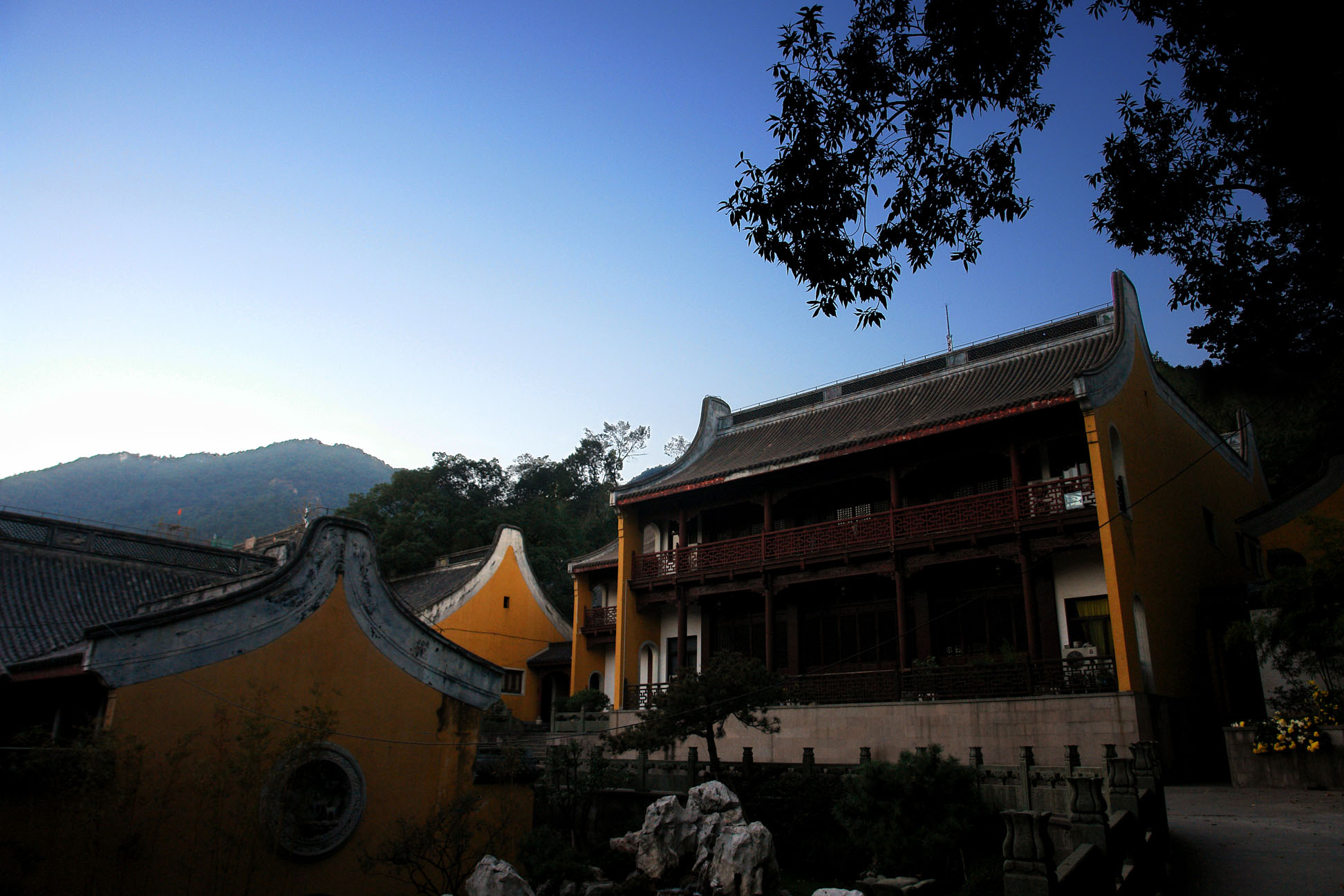
Living quarters for monastics in the temple

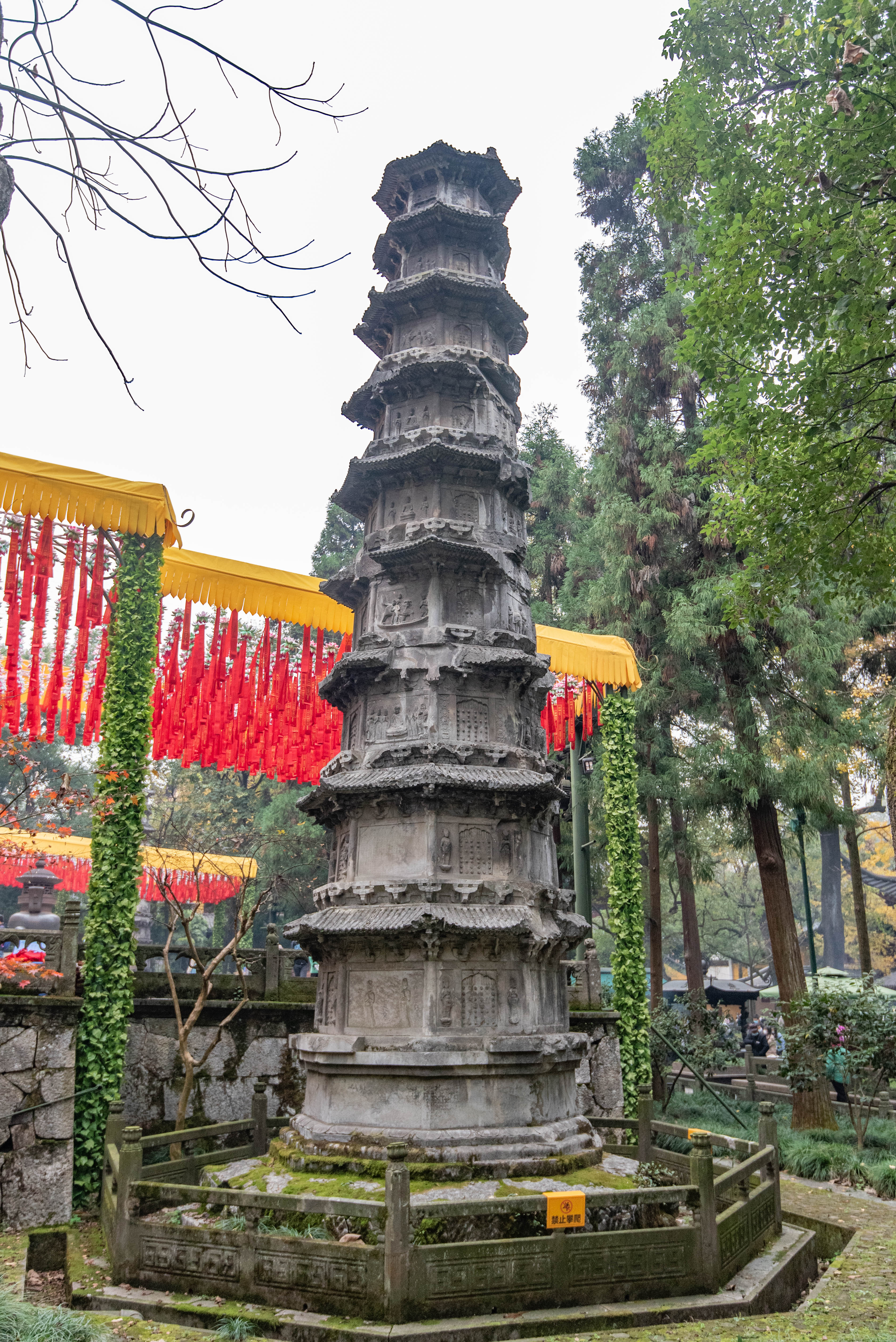
The western sutra pillar

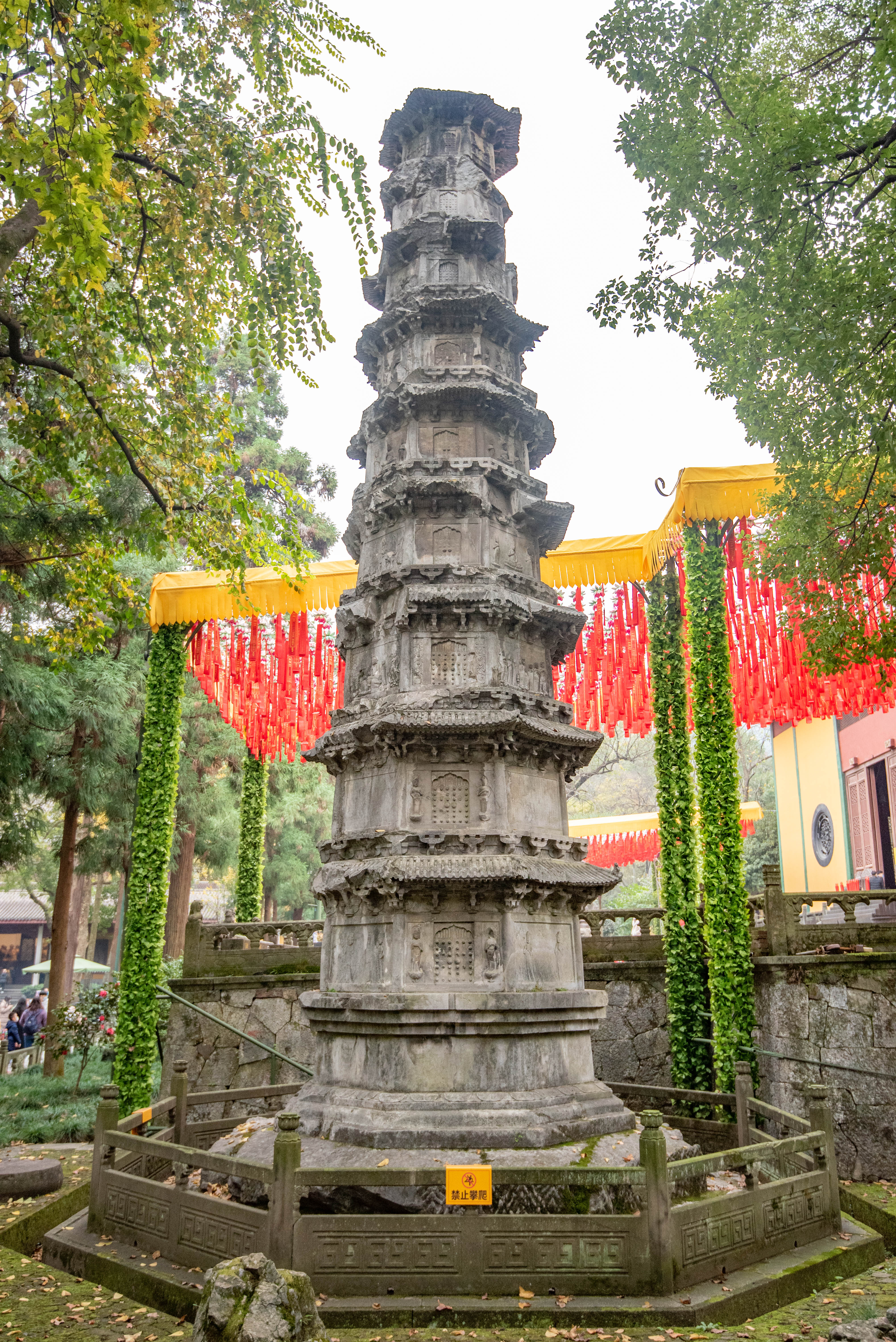
The eastern sutra pillar

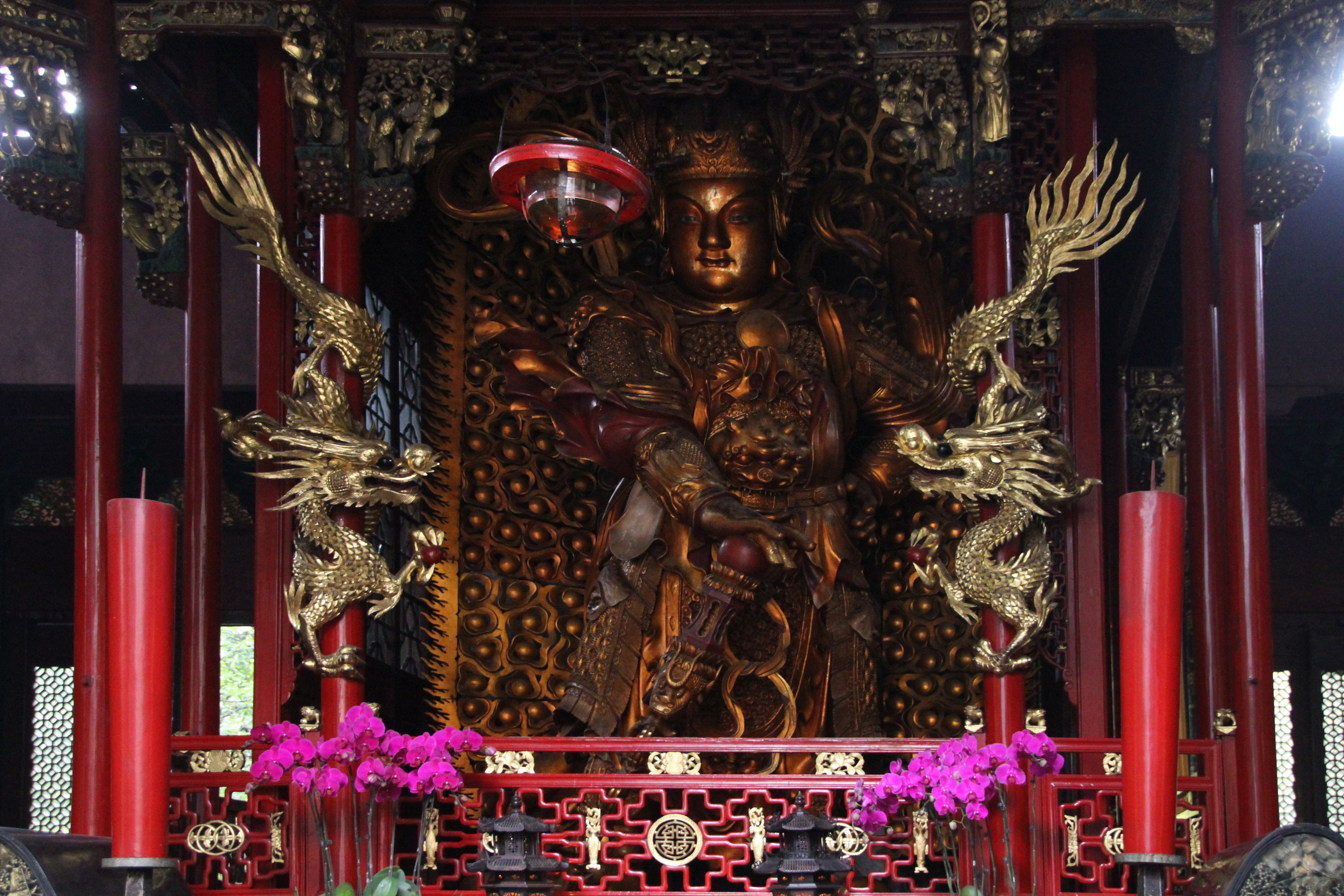
Song dynasty statue of the dharmapala Weituo in the Hall of the Four Heavenly Kings

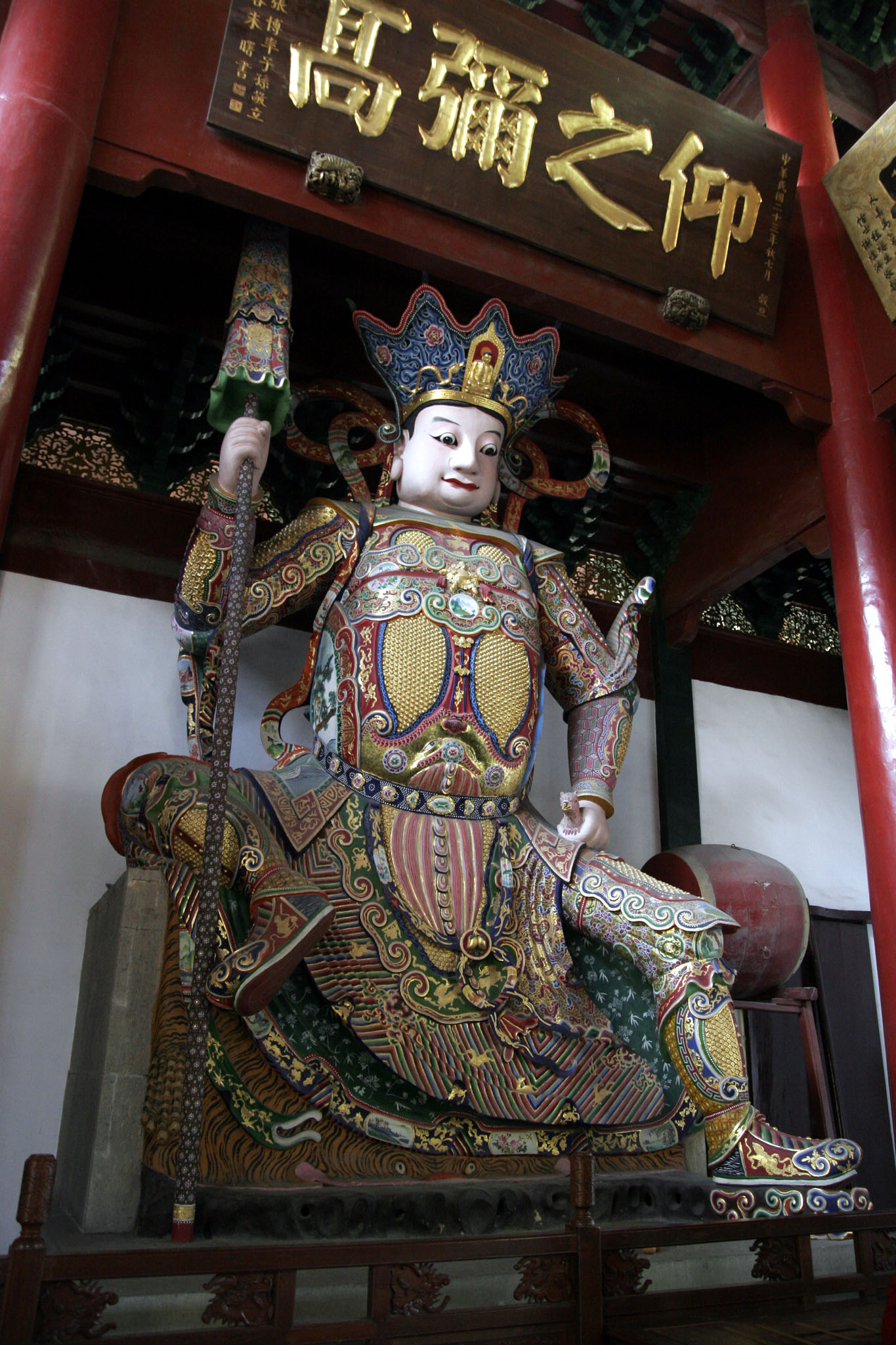
Statue of Vaiśravaṇa (Duōwén Tiānwáng), Heavenly King of the North

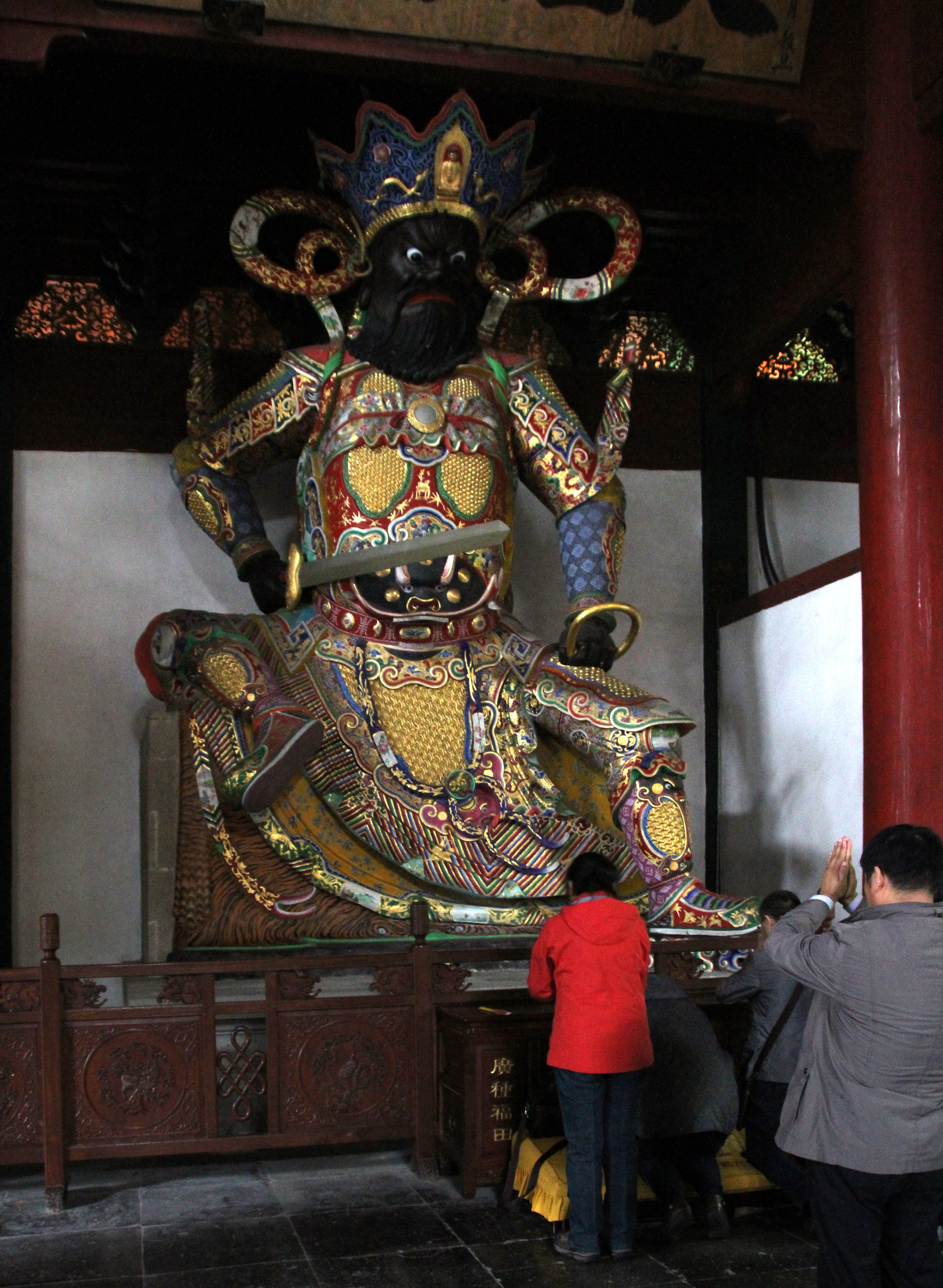
Statue of Virūḍhaka (Zēngzhǎng Tiānwáng), Heavenly King of the South

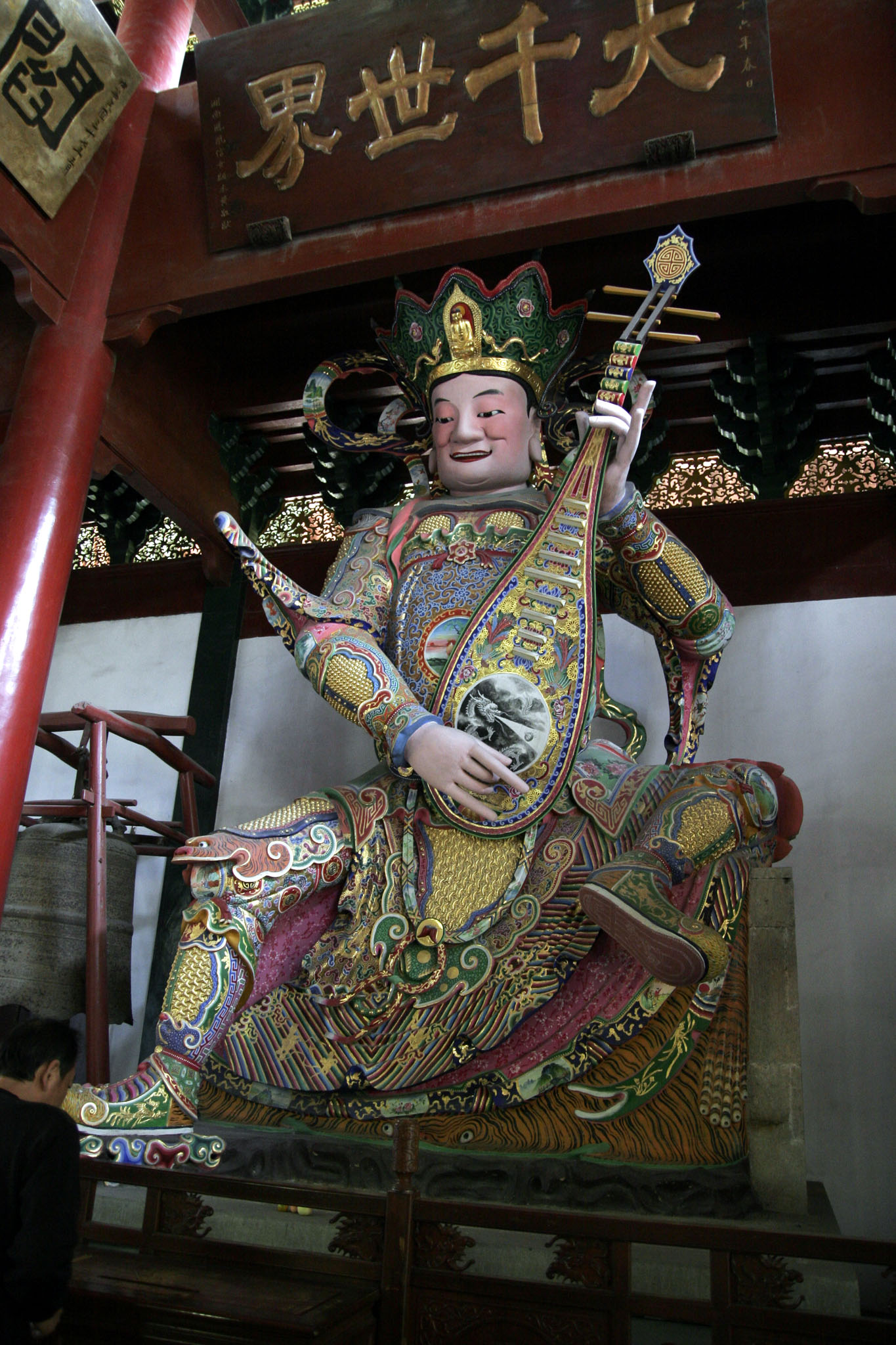
Statue of Dhṛtarāṣṭra (Chíguó Tiānwáng), Heavenly King of the East

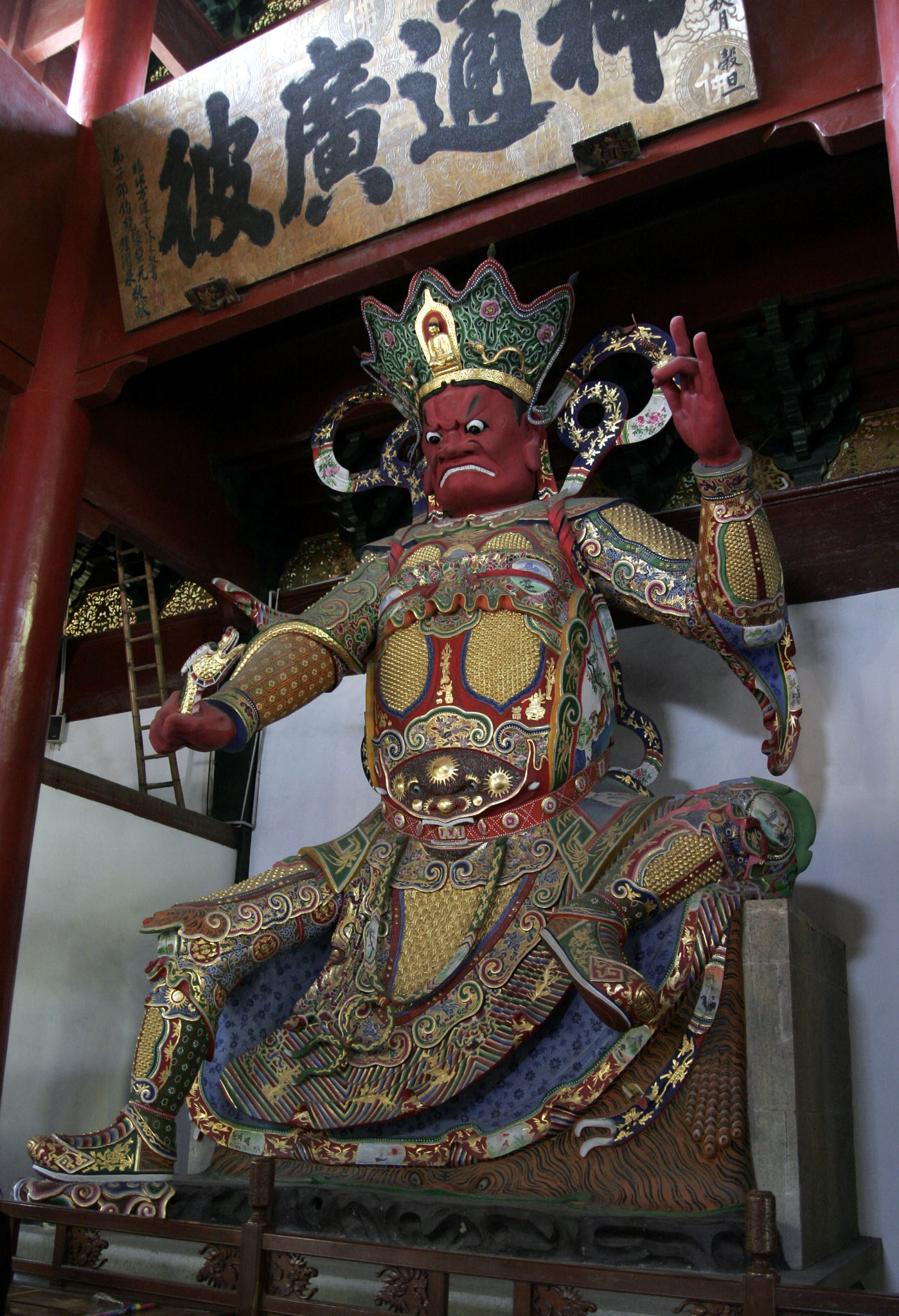
Statue of Virūpākṣa (Guăngmù Tiānwáng), Heavenly King of the West

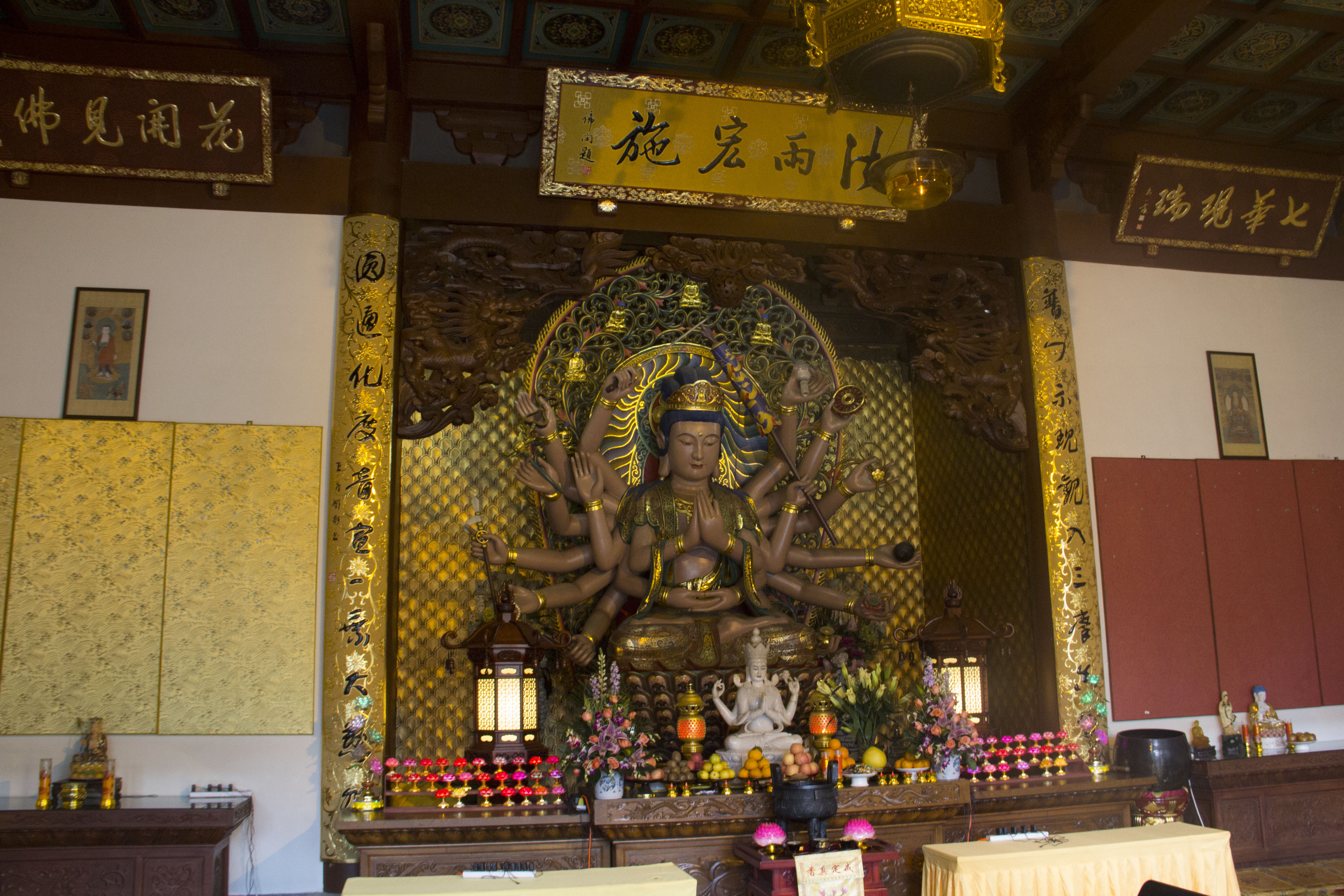
Shrine and statue of the Bodhisattva Zhunti in the Mahavira Hall

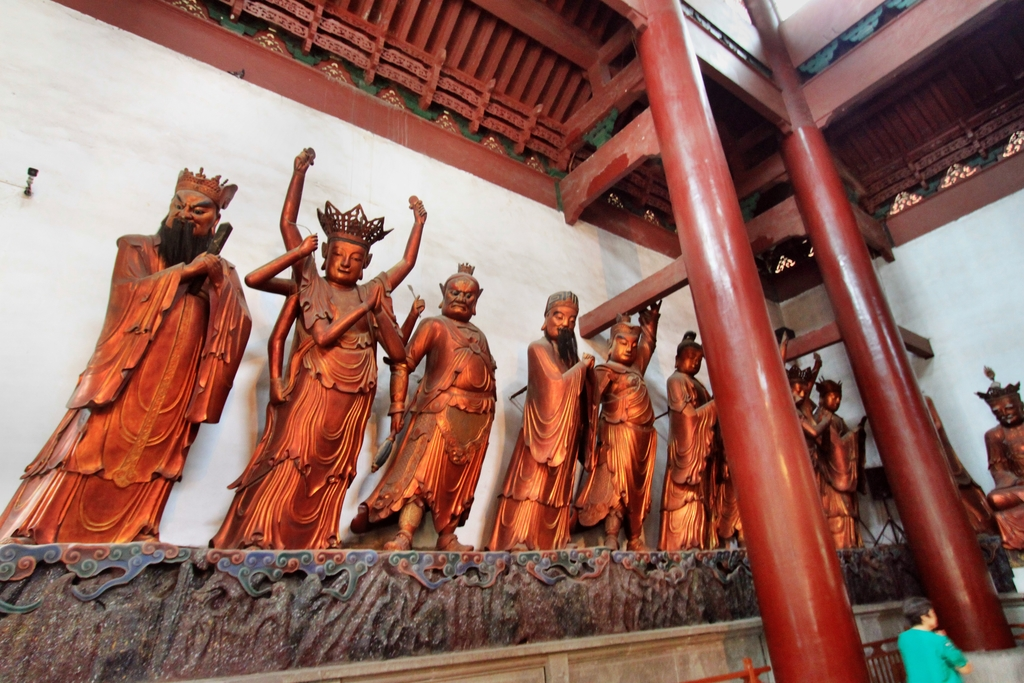
Statues of the Twenty-Four Devas (二十四諸天 Èrshísì Zhūtiān) on the left side of the Mahavira Hall

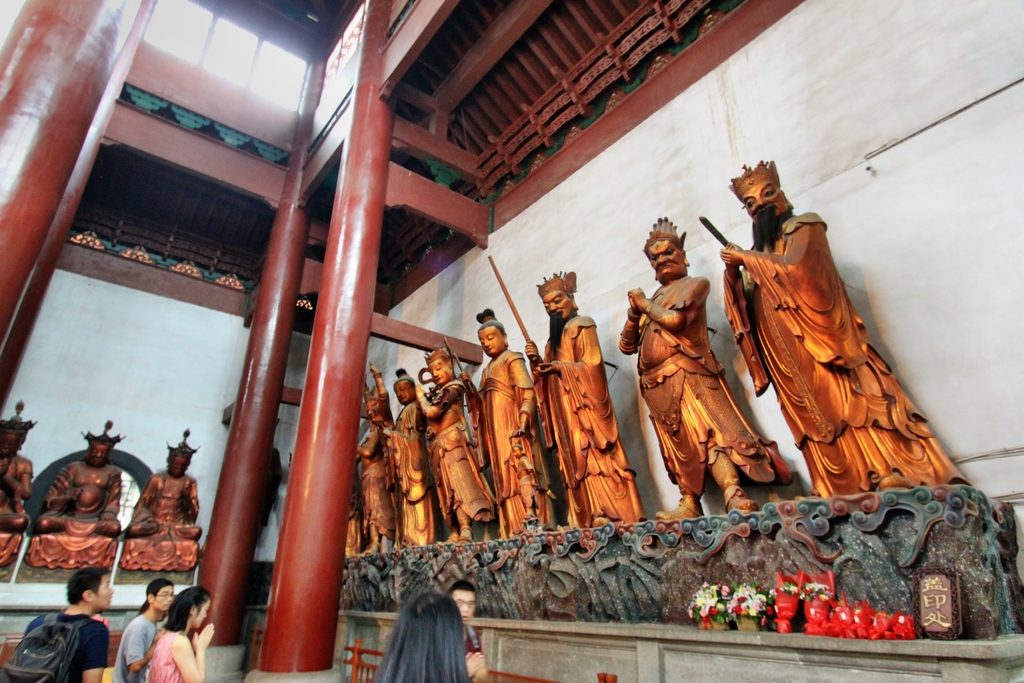
Statues of the Twenty-Four Devas (二十四諸天 Èrshísì Zhūtiān) on the right side of the Mahavira Hall

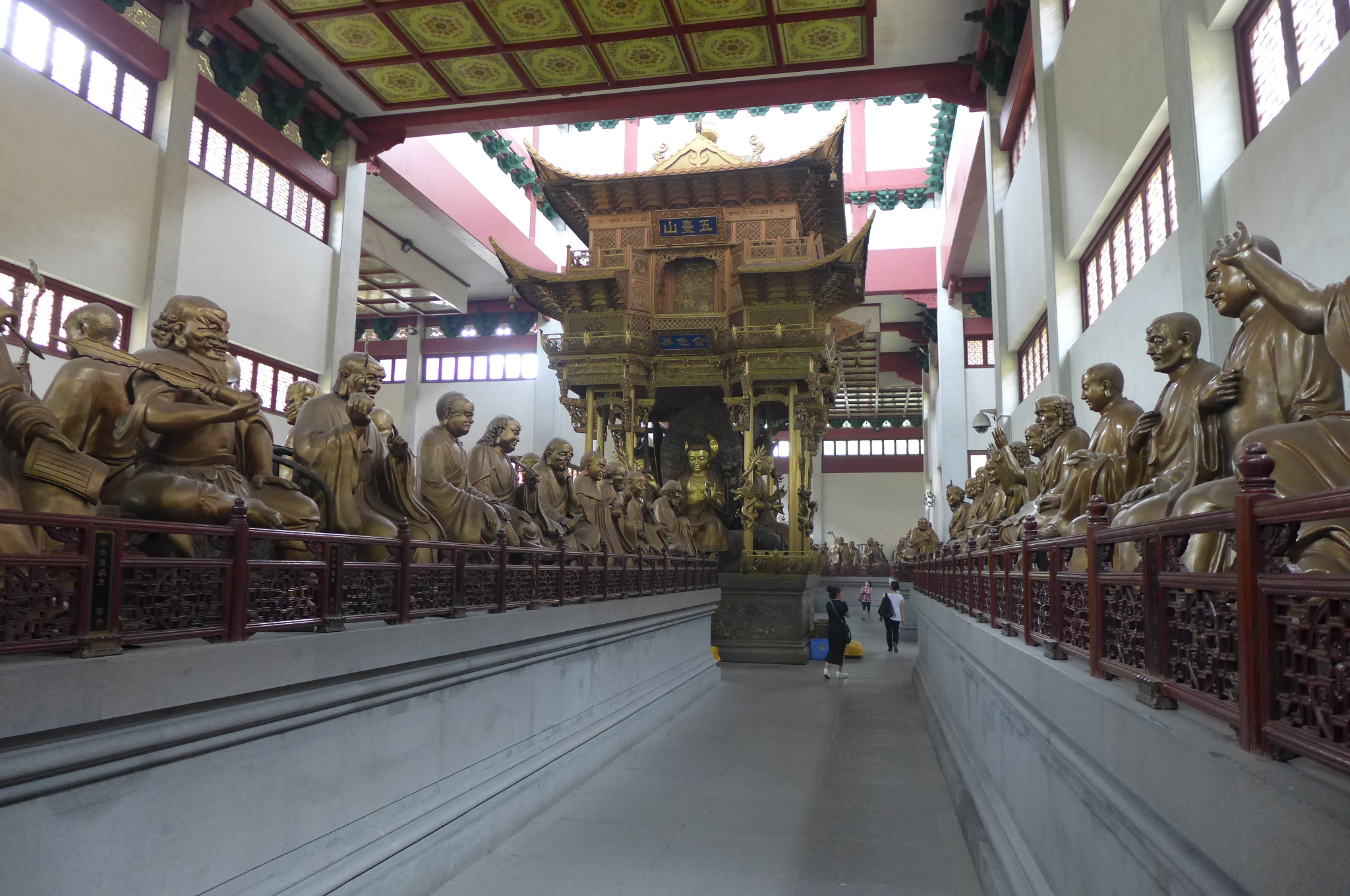
Arhat statues enshrined inside the Hall of the Five Hundred Arhats

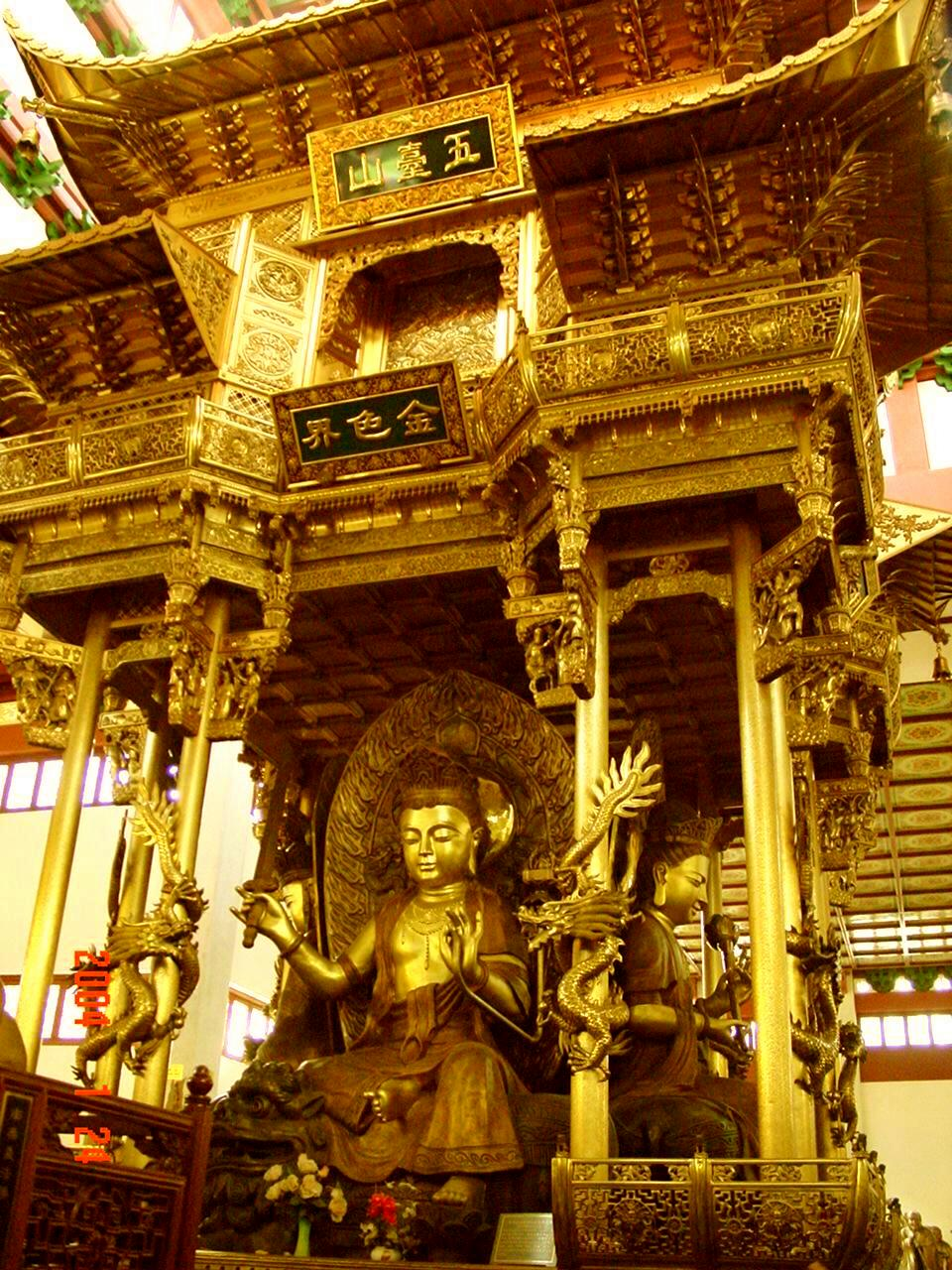
Statue of Wenshu in the Bronze Canopy within the Hall of the Five Hundred Arhats

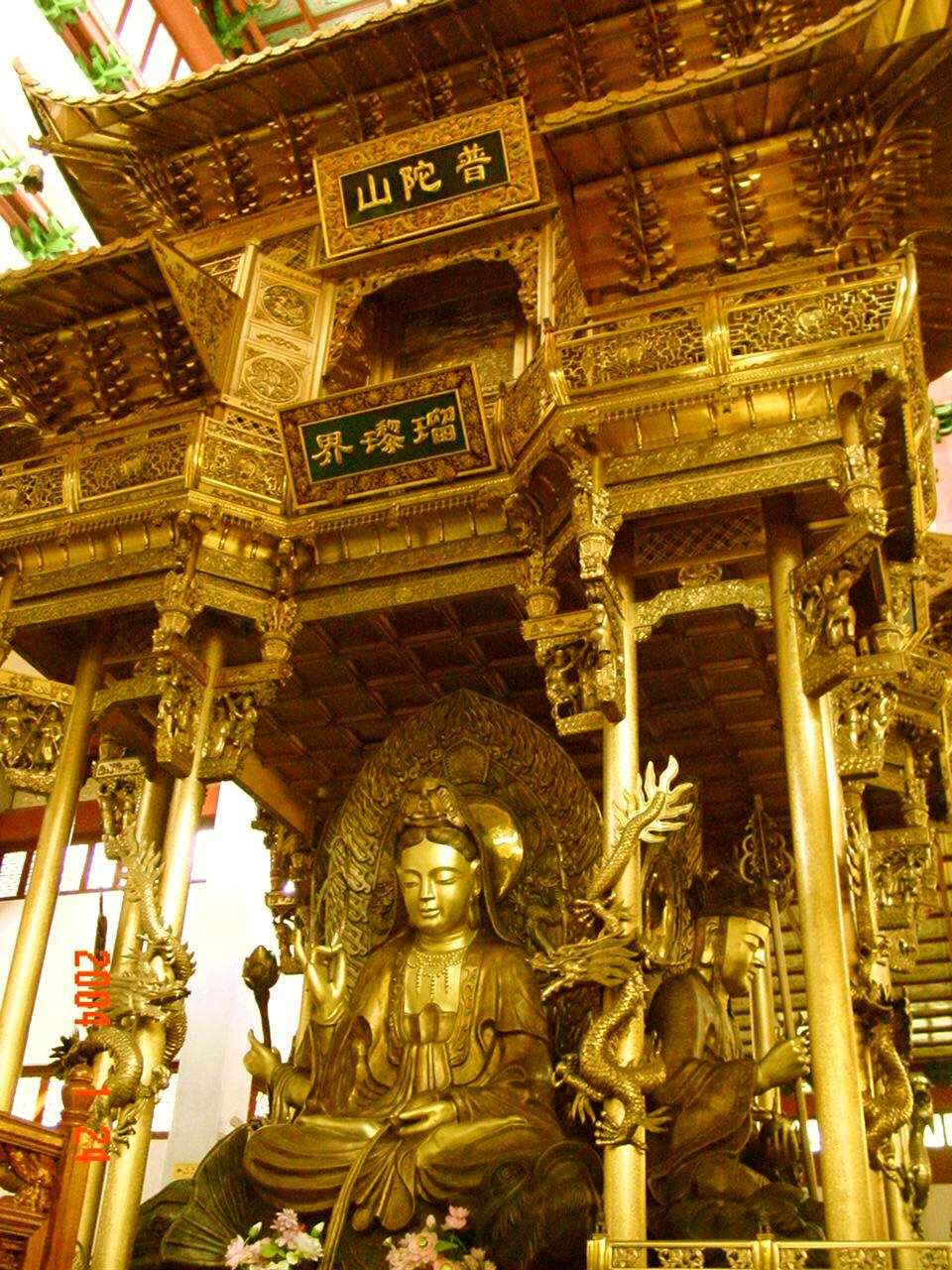
Statue of Guanyin in the Bronze Canopy within the Hall of the Five Hundred Arhats

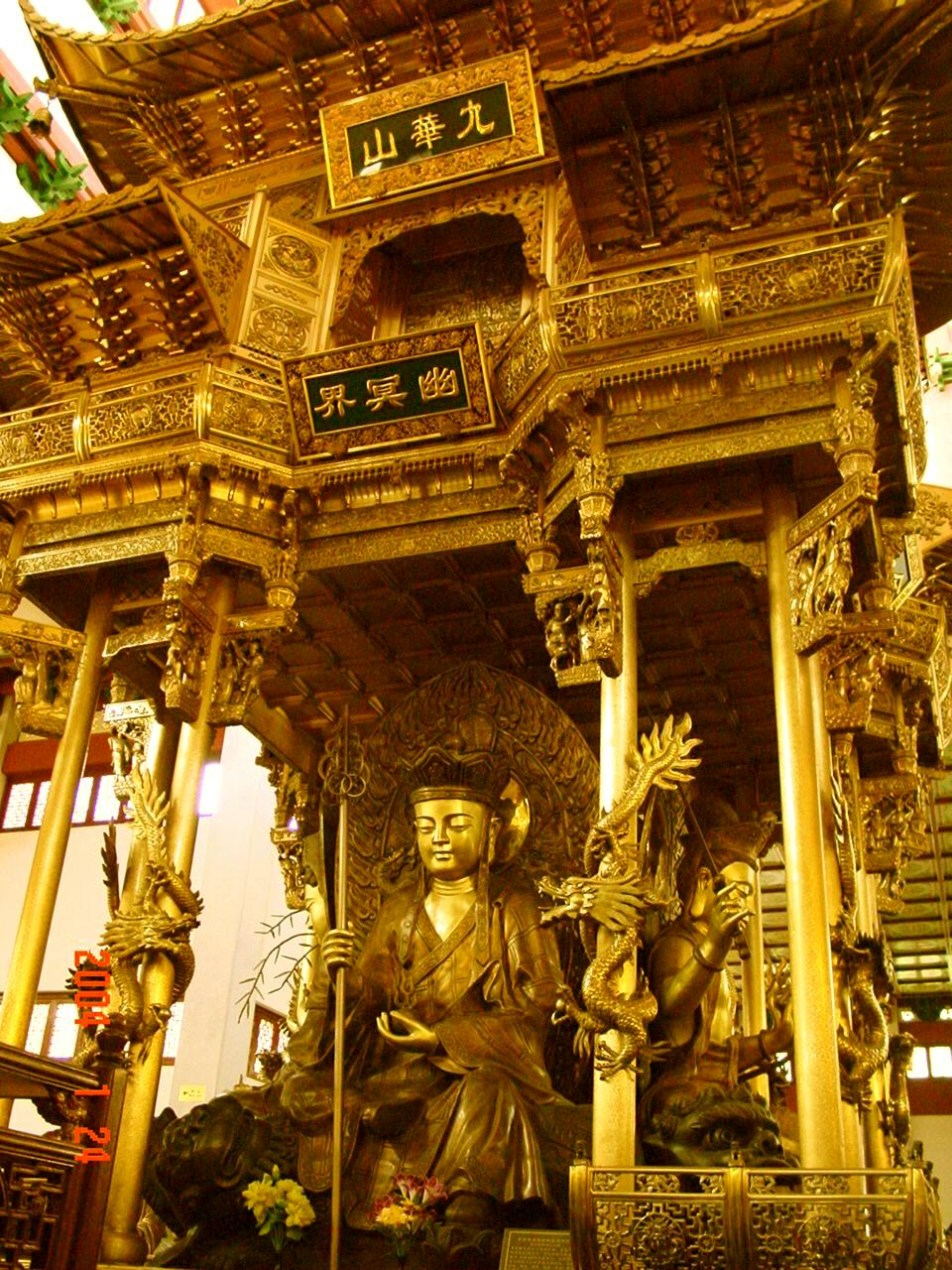
Statue of Dizang in the Bronze Canopy within the Hall of the Five Hundred Arhats

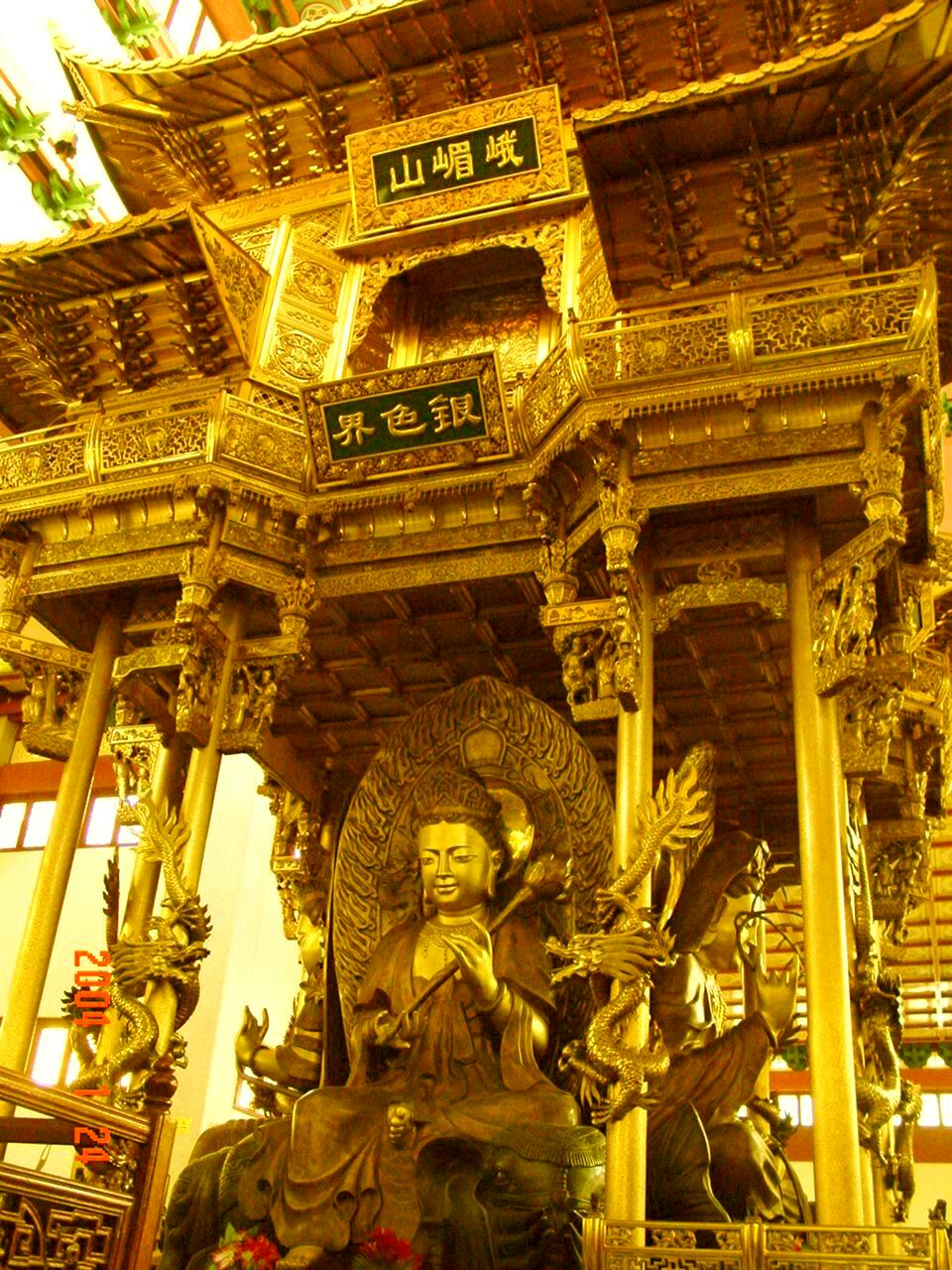
Statue of Puxian in the Bronze Canopy within the Hall of the Five Hundred Arhats

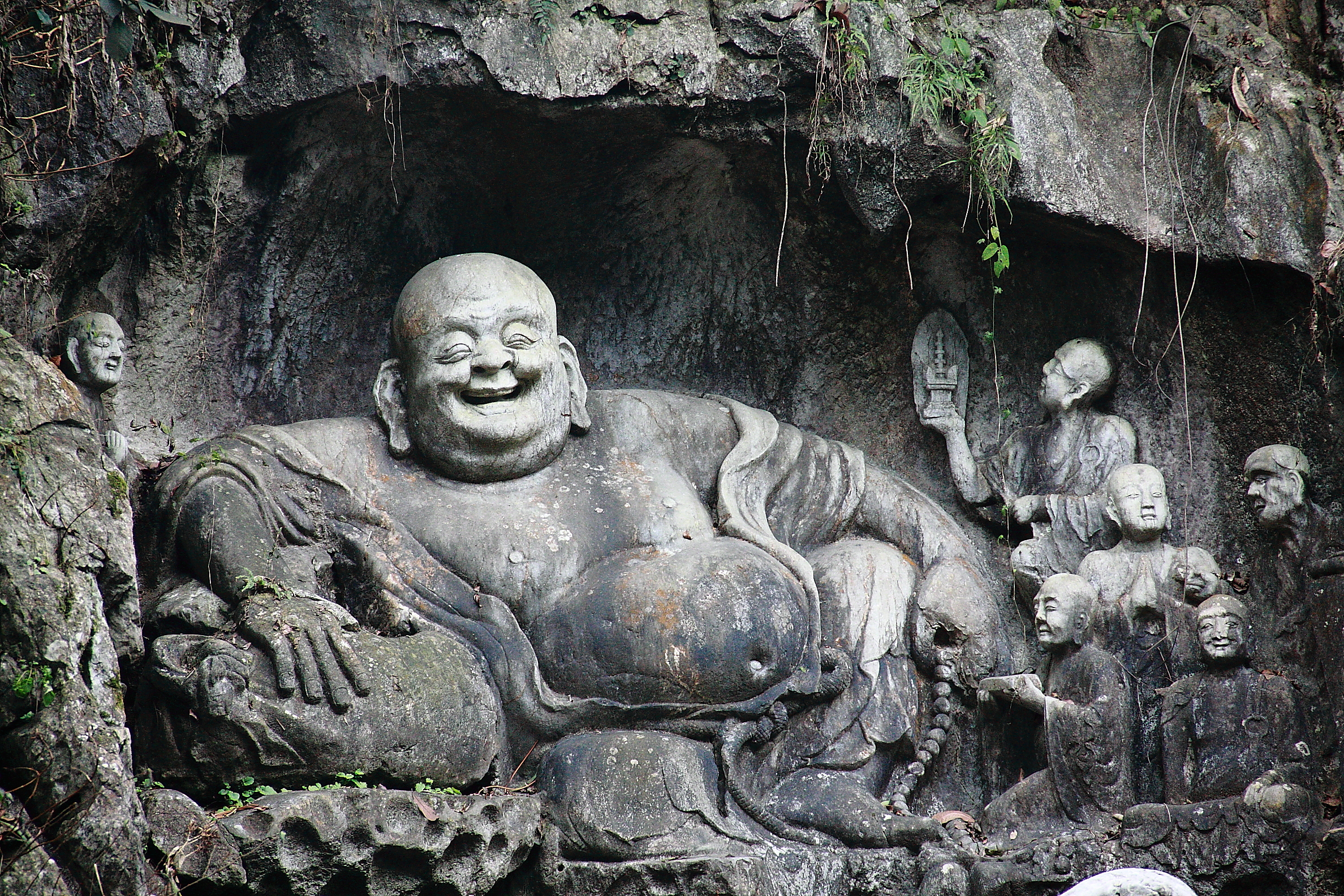
Rock carving of Budai in the grottos

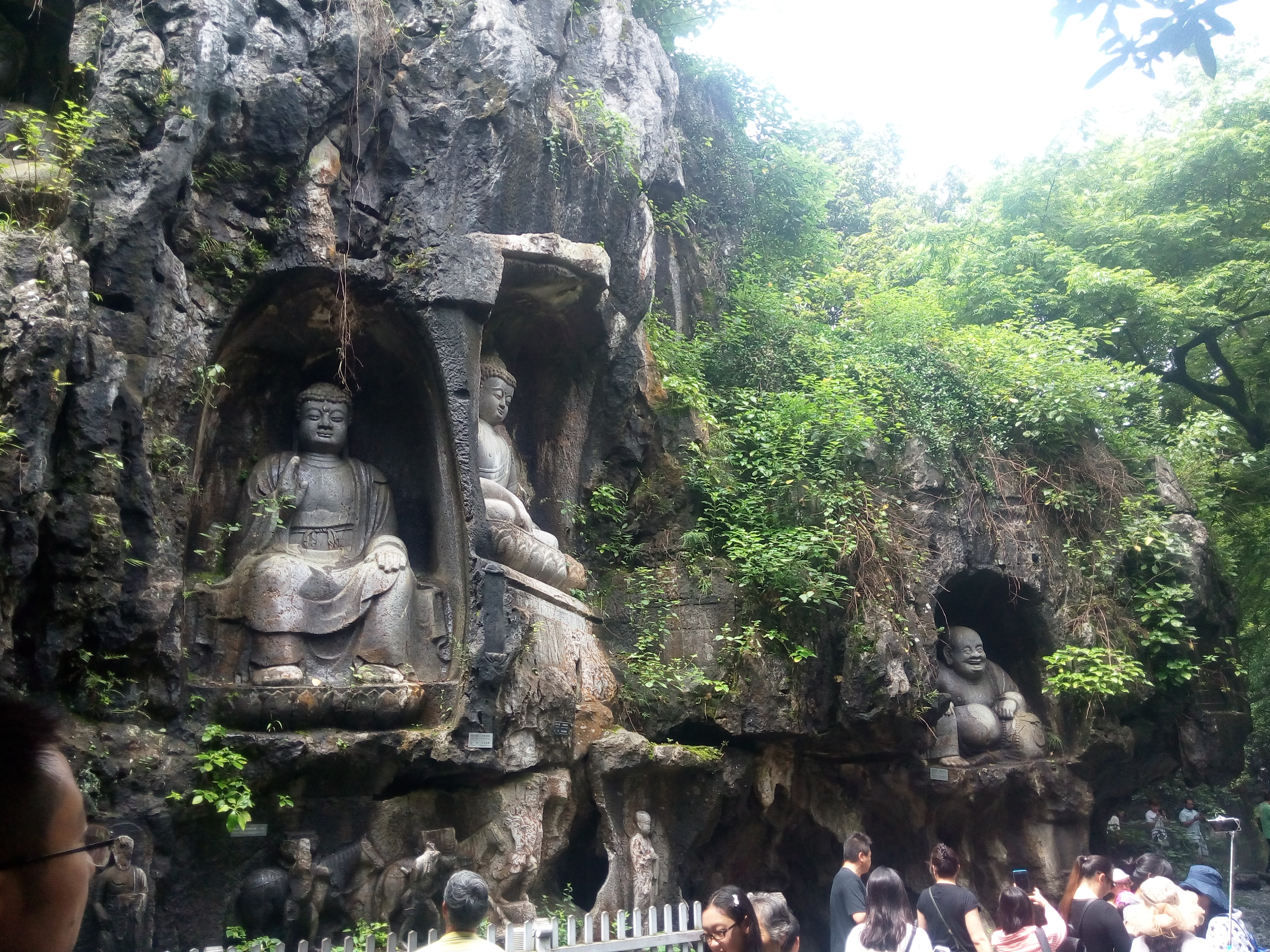
Statues in the grottos

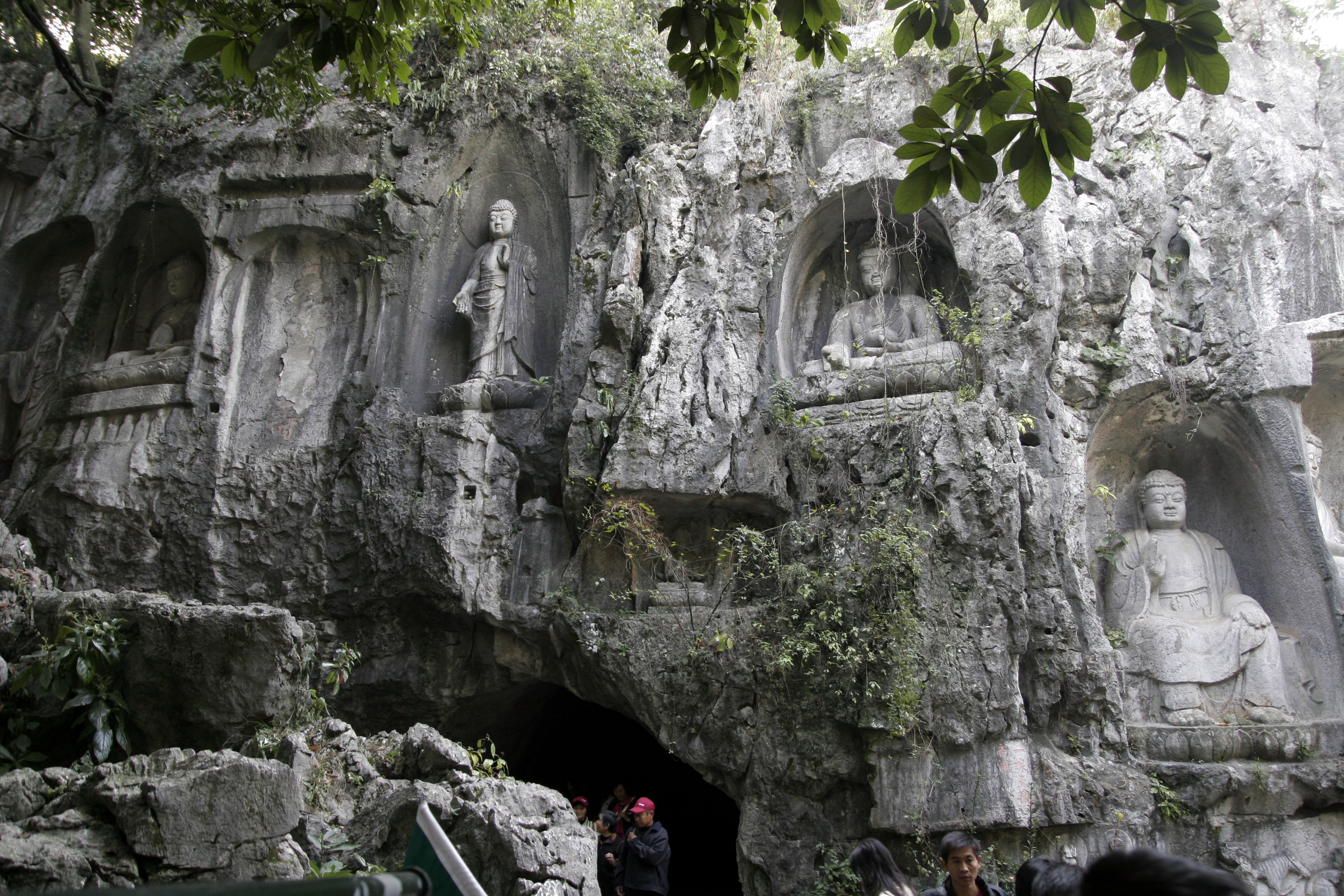
Statues in the grottos

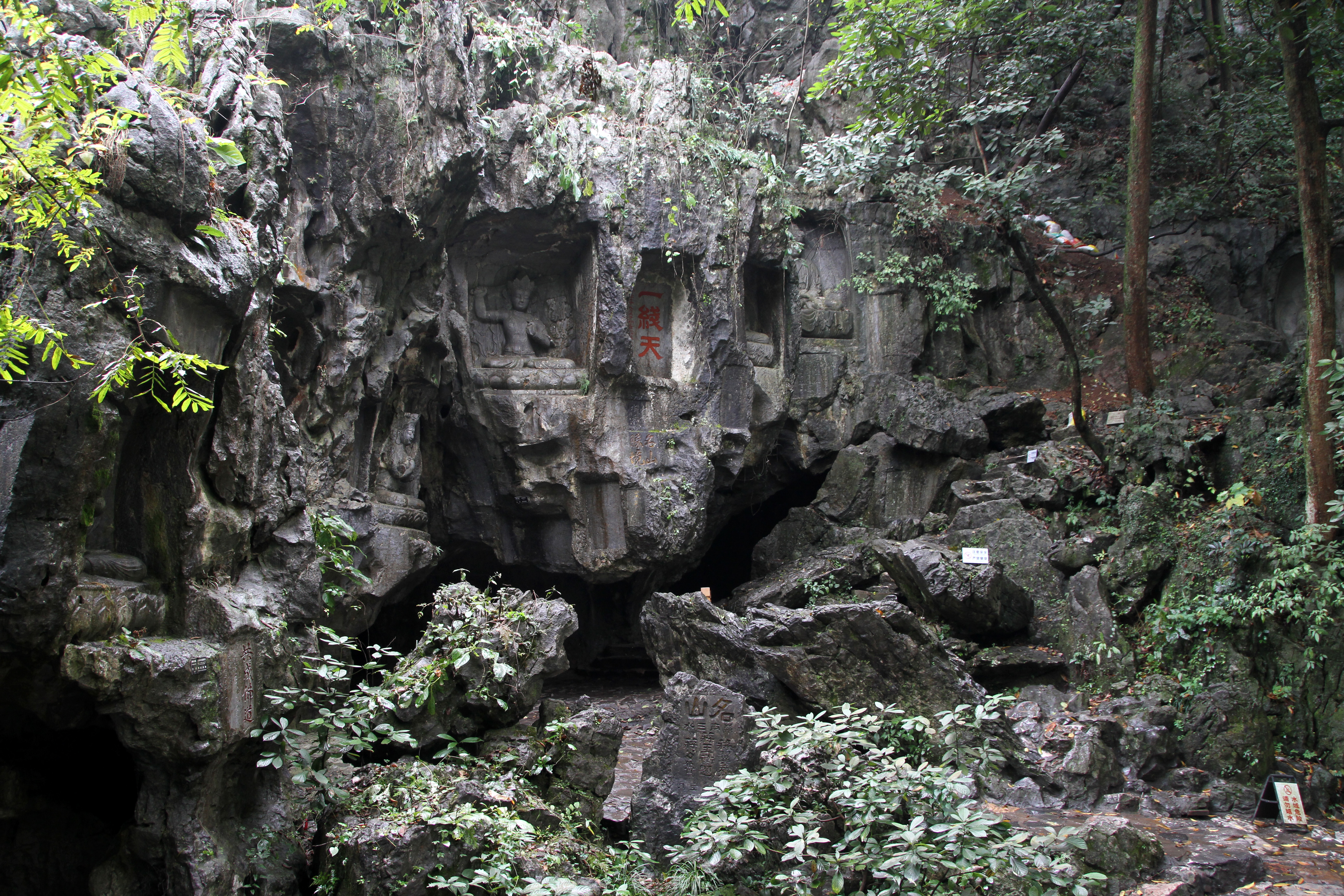
Statues in the grottos
