= Huili (monk) =

Indian Buddhist monk and pilgrim

- Chinese: 慧理
Transcriptions
Standard Mandarin
- Hanyu Pinyin: Huìlǐ
- Wade–Giles: Hui-li

Huili (fl. 320s AD) was an Indian Buddhist monk and missionary legendarily credited with the establishment of the Lingyin Temple in the Wulin Hills of Hangzhou, now one of the holiest Buddhist shrines in China. His Indian name is uncertain, but was possibly Matiyukti. He is said to have arrived in Hangzhou in 326 and to have founded his monastery two years later.
