= Arhat Hall =

Space in East Asian Buddhist temples

Chinese name
- Traditional Chinese: 羅漢堂
- Simplified Chinese: 罗汉堂
Transcriptions
Standard Mandarin
- Hanyu Pinyin: Luóhàn Táng

Alternative Chinese name
- Traditional Chinese: 羅漢殿
- Simplified Chinese: 罗汉殿
Transcriptions
Standard Mandarin
- Hanyu Pinyin: Luóhàn Diàn

Vietnamese name
- Vietnamese alphabet: La Hán Đường
- Chữ Hán: 羅漢堂

Korean name
- Hangul: 나한전
- Hanja: 羅漢殿
Transcriptions
- Revised Romanization: Nahanjeon
- McCune–Reischauer: Nahanjŏn

Japanese name
- Kanji: 羅漢堂
Transcriptions
- Romanization: Rakan-dō

The Arhat Hall is a building in East Asian Buddhist temples dedicated to the veneration of the Arhats (Sanskrit: Arhat; Pali: Arahant), who are enlightened disciples of the Buddha. It serves as spaces for contemplation on the Buddha's teachings and the diverse paths to enlightenment. The life-sized statues of Arhats within these halls are renowned for their vivid, individualized expressions and poses, depicting a range of human emotions and spiritual states. They are typically named the Luohan tang in Chinese Buddhist temples, the Rakan-dō in Japanese Buddhist temples, the Nahan-jeon in Korean Buddhist temples, and La Hán Đường in Vietnamese Buddhist temples.

== China ==
The Arhat Hall is a hall used for enshrining one or multiple Arhats, or arhat(s), in Chinese Buddhist temples. Arhat is another term for Arahant, one who has gained insight into the true nature of existence and has achieved Enlightenment and liberated from the endless cycle of rebirth. In Mahayana Buddhism, arhats rank the third position in Buddhism, only below the Buddhas and bodhisattvas. In Theravada Buddhism, Siddhartha Gautama or The Buddha is the first of the arhats, while his disciples who reach the goal by following his noble path also become arahats.

The tradition of constructing Arhat Hall became prominent in China during the Five dynasties period (10th century) when the King of Wuyue commissioned 500 bronze Arhats for the Fangguang Temple on Tiantai Mountain. By 985 CE, 516 statues (including 16 Arhats and 500 Arhats) were installed in the Shouchang Temple on Tiantai Mountain.

In smaller Buddhist temples, statues of the Eighteen Arhats, the original followers of Śākyamuni, are usually enshrined within the hall. In larger Buddhist temples, the Arhat Hall typically enshrines statues of all the Five Hundred Arhats, a larger grouping which encompasses other Buddhist deities such as Hayagriva and Yamantaka who take the forms of Arhats. In addition, statues of the four main Bodhisattvas in Chinese Buddhism, namely Guanyin (Avalokiteśvara), Kṣitigarbha, Samantabhadra and Mañjuśrī are often enshrined as well, along with the Wisdom King Mahamayuri (Mahāmāyūrī).

== Japan ==
In Japan, the Arhat Hall is devotion to the 500 Arhats became widespread during the Edo period. These halls are dedicated to the veneration of the Arhats, and the statues are admired for their intricate craftsmanship and emotional expressiveness. One of the most famous examples is the Gohyaku Rakan-ji in Tokyo's Meguro Ward. Its statues were carved by the monk Shōun Genkei between 1688 and 1704. He traveled around Edo soliciting donations to create over 536 wooden, lacquered, and gold-leafed statues, of which 305 survive today. Another notable hall is at Chikuraku-ji in Tokushima Prefecture, built in 1775. Arhat Hall at Chikuraku-ji is located behind the main hall, accessible via a stone staircase. At Gohyaku Rakan-ji, the statues are arranged in the main hall and a dedicated Arhat Hall, with the central Buddha triad surrounded by the Arhats. The Arhats at Gohyaku Rakan-ji are about 85cm tall, seated, and display a variety of expressions and postures—some meditating, others frowning, wearing hoods or head wraps—showcasing the exaggerated realism typical of Edo-period sculpture. At Chikuraku-ji, approximately 200 statues remain from the original 500, each with a unique expression.

== Korea ==
In Korea, the worship of Arhats was integrated into Korean Buddhism, with halls dedicated to them, though the 500 Arhat tradition is less widespread than in China or Japan. While specific records of 500 Arhat Halls are scarce, the Buk Jijang-sa (북지장사, North Jijang Temple) in Daegu, founded in 485, is an example of a temple dedicated to Kṣitigarbha, who is associated with the salvation of beings in the six realms. According to legend, the temple was built after a visionary encounter with Kṣitigarbha. The statues within may depict the 500 Arhats or a smaller group, crafted with the serene and compassionate aesthetics of Korean Buddhist art.

== Vietnam ==
In Vietnamese Buddhism, the veneration of the 500 Arhats was influenced by Chinese Buddhism, and the Arhat Hall can be found in some Vietnamese temples, often featuring a mix of Mahayana Buddhist and local spiritual elements. The Kṣitigarbha Flying Temple (地藏飛來寺, Chùa Địa Tạng Phi Lai) in Vietnam is a temple named after Kṣitigarbha, believed to have been visited by the bodhisattva. While its main hall is dedicated to Kṣitigarbha, the temple complex embraces a holistic Buddhist practice. The main hall houses a majestic and compassionate statue of Kṣitigarbha Bodhisattva. While the temple complex include Arhat Hall, its primary focus is on the bodhisattva.

== Gallery ==
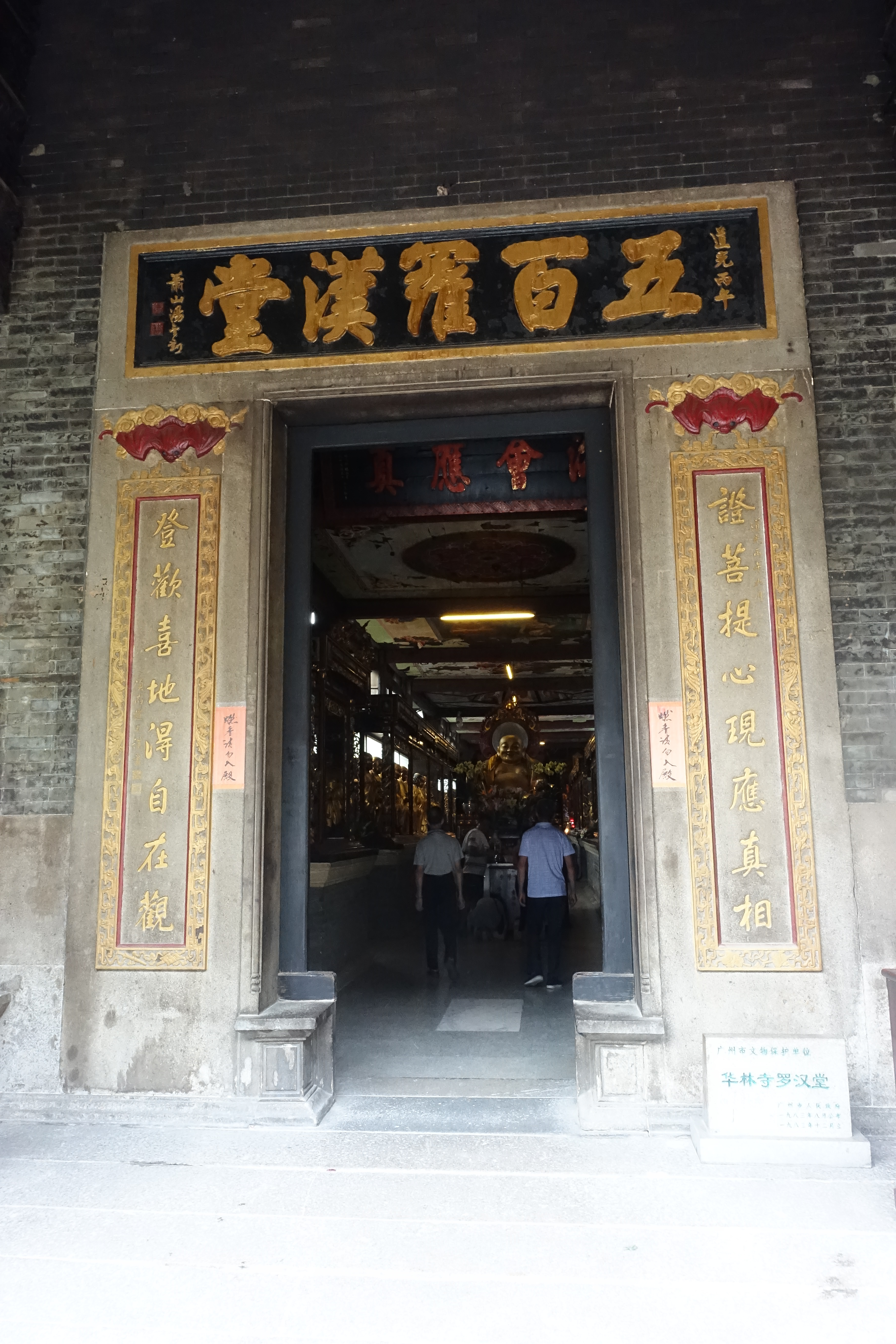
Arhat Hall in Hualin Temple in Guangzhou, China

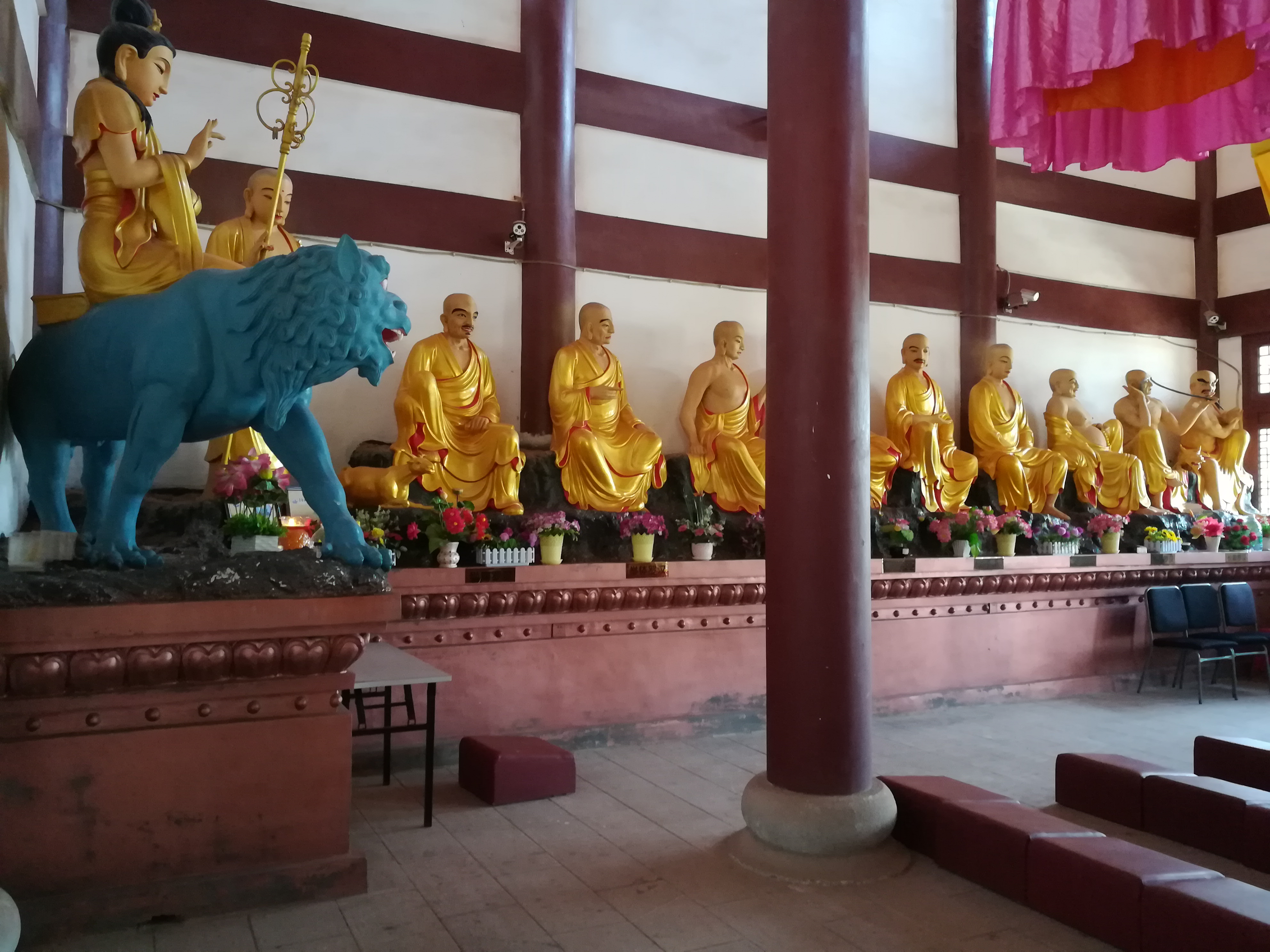
Statues of Eighteen Arhats at Lingsheng Temple in Hunan, China.

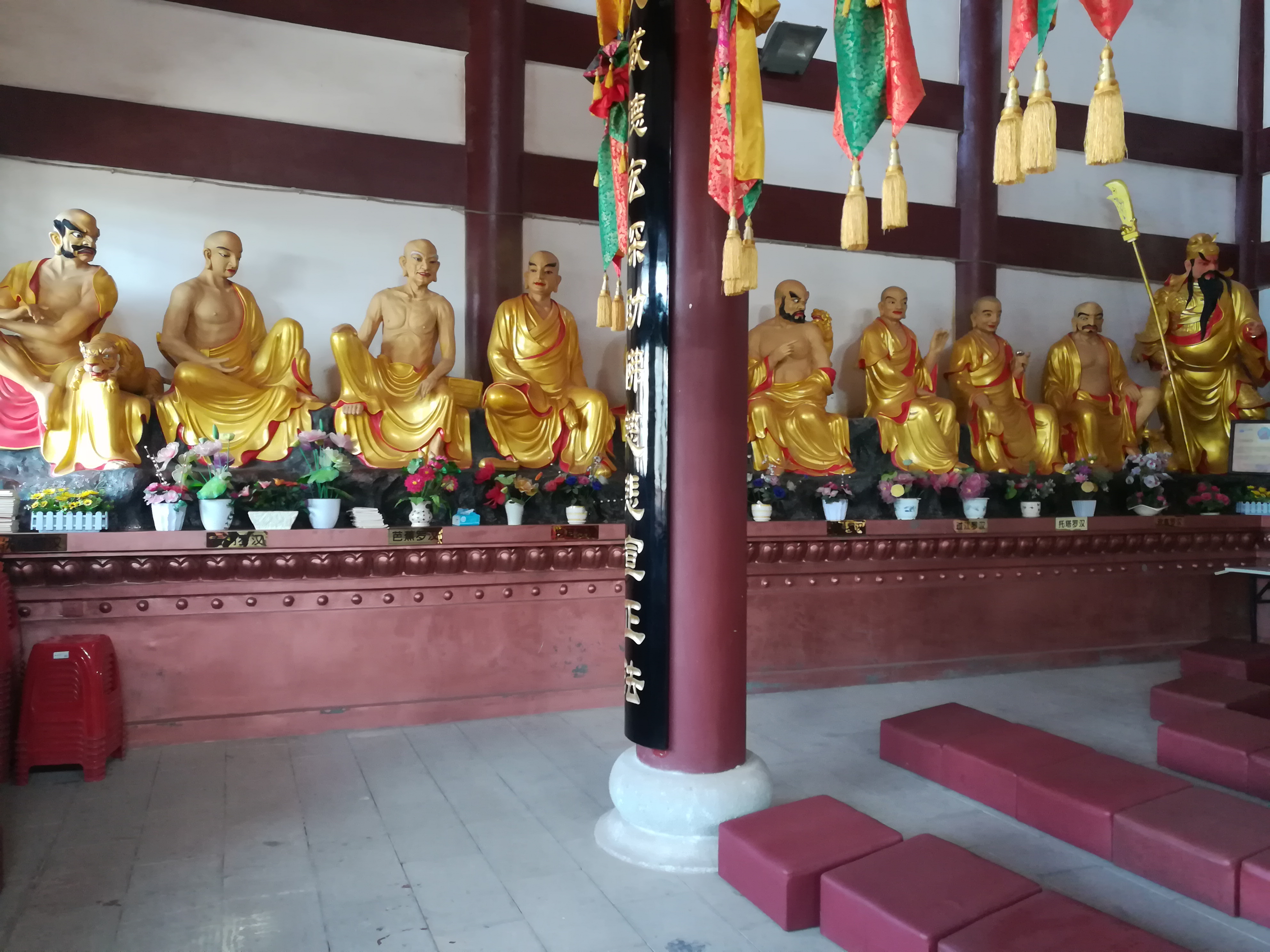
Statues of Eighteen Arhats at Lingsheng Temple in Hunan, China.

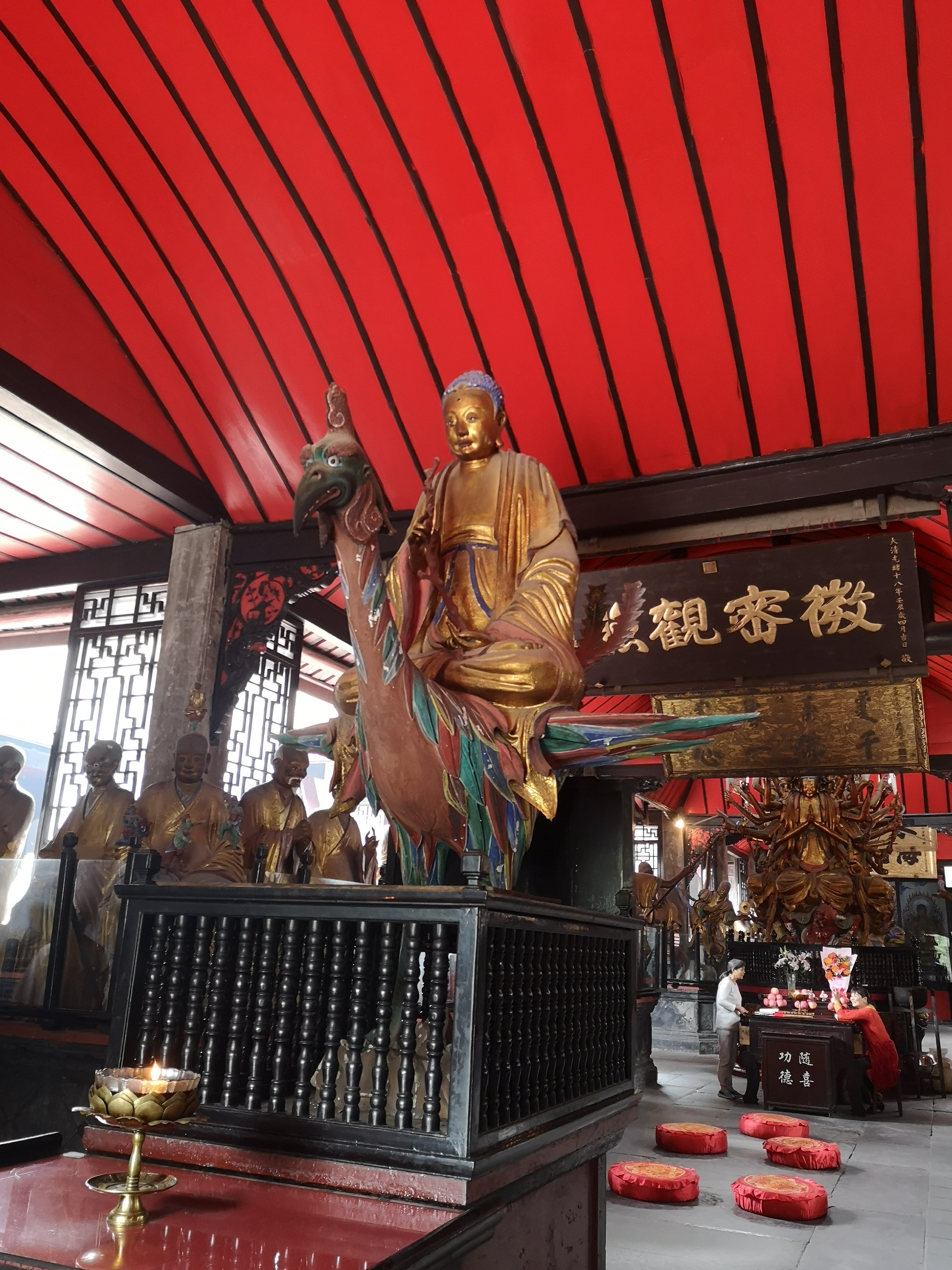
Statue of Amituofo (Amitābha) riding on a peacock at the centre and the Thousand-armed Guanyin at the rear of the Five Hundred Arhat Hall of Baoguang Temple in Chengdu, Sichuan province, China
