= Chinese medical doll =

Small sculpture of a woman historically used as a diagnostic tool in China

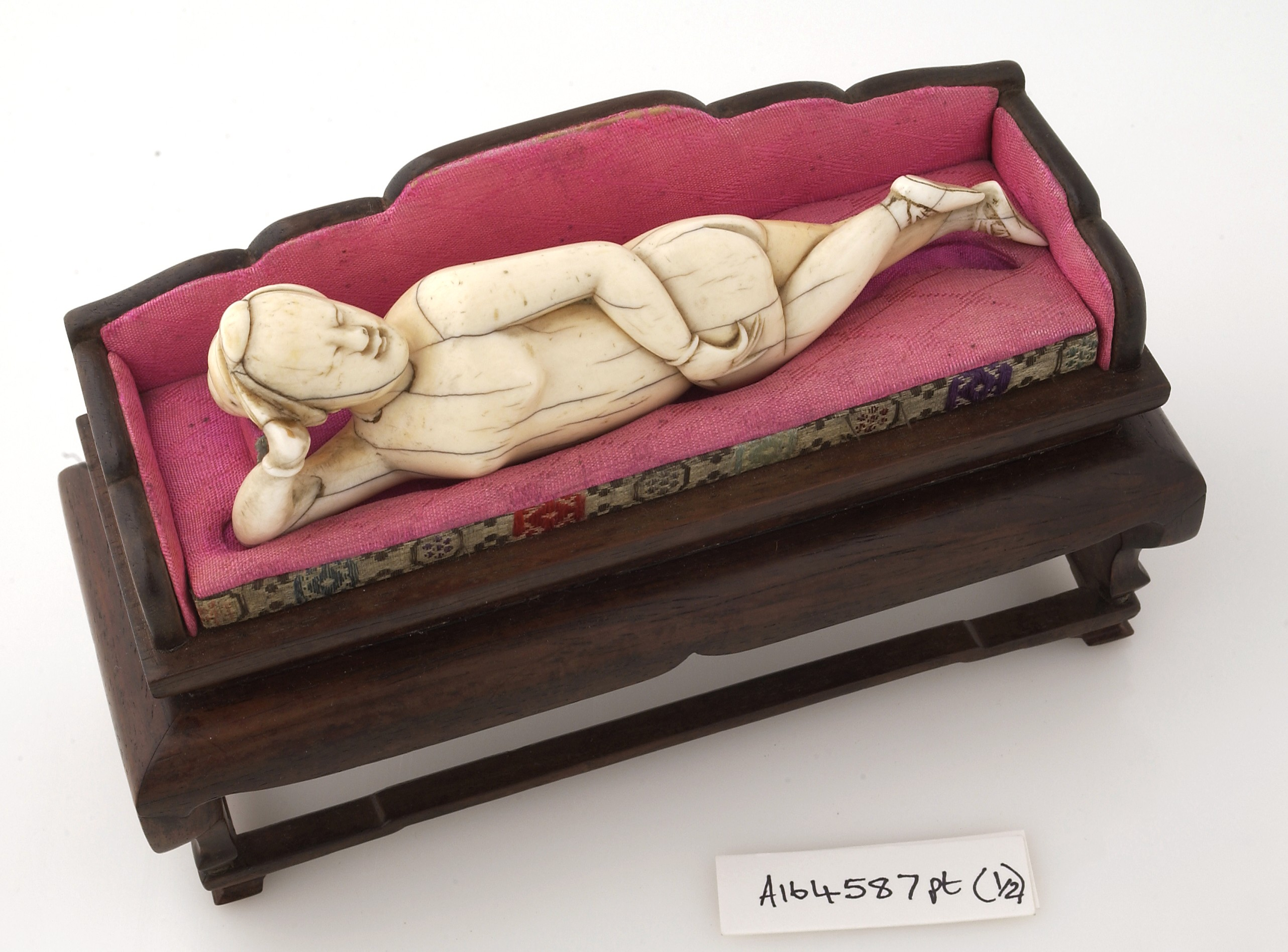
An ivory medical doll with a wooden base

A Chinese medical doll, also known as a diagnostic doll or "Doctor's lady", is a type of small sculpture of a female figure, historically used in China and parts of Asia as a diagnostic tool.

== History ==
In China, the dolls have been recorded as early as the 15th century Ming Dynasty, with some still seeing use into the 1950s. During this time, the prevailing attitudes of feminine modesty made it improper for a woman to gesture or describe parts of her own body. Because of this, when seeing a physician, a woman would indicate medical issues by referring instead to the respective anatomy of the doll.

The dolls depicted a nude woman, lying either on her side or back, positioned in such a way that a user would be able to point to every part of the body. They are typically made of ivory or jade and are uncolored, often with an accompanying pedestal shaped like a couch or bed made of ivory or wood. It is not uncommon, especially on older figures, for the woman to be depicted with small pointed feet, representative of the practice of foot binding which was common in China until the 20th century. The figures typically measure anywhere from 75 to 150 mm (3.0 to 5.9 in) in length. In addition to the functional form, many of the dolls depict aesthetic additions including jewelry, fans, and shoes, and some feature colored hair, typically painted with lacquer.

Visits to physicians by women during this time were restricted by attitudes of modesty and contact between genders, as physicians were almost always men. Visits by women to doctors were often conducted with a screen made of bamboo between the two, with the woman only reaching her hands out from behind the screen to interact with the medical doll. These dolls were typically owned by the physicians themselves; however, upper-class clientele would sometimes have their own customized dolls, and some would even send a servant in place of themselves to describe their condition.

== See also ==
- Traditional Chinese medicine
- Women in China
