= Traditional Chinese medicine =

Alternative medicine category

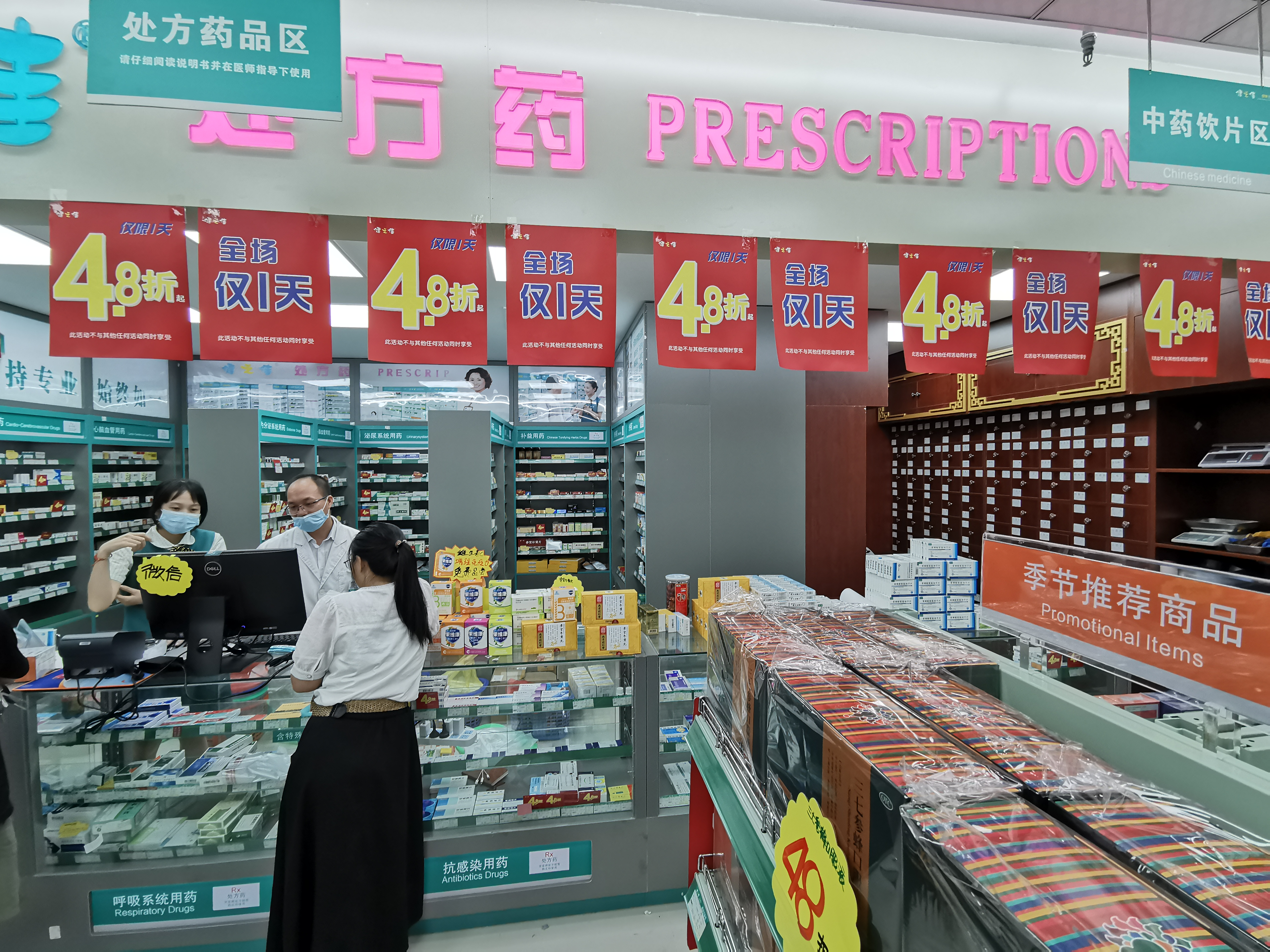
- A prescription section of a pharmacy in Nanning, Guangxi, China, with prepackaged Chinese and Western medicine (left) and Chinese medicinal herbs (right) behind the sales counter

Chinese name
- Traditional Chinese: 中醫
- Simplified Chinese: 中医
- Literal meaning: 'Chinese medicine'
Transcriptions
Standard Mandarin
- Hanyu Pinyin: Zhōngyī
- Bopomofo: ㄓㄨㄥ ㄧ
- Wade–Giles: Chung^{1}-i^{1}
- IPA: [ʈʂʊ́ŋ í]
Yue: Cantonese
- Yale Romanization: Jūng yī
- Jyutping: Zung1 ji1
- IPA: [tsʊŋ˥ ji˥]
Southern Min
- Hokkien POJ: Tiong-i
- Tâi-lô: Tiong-i

Vietnamese name
- Vietnamese alphabet: Y học cổ truyền Trung Quốc; Đông y; thuốc Bắc; thuốc Tàu
- Hán-Nôm: 醫學古傳中國; 東醫; 𧆄北; 艚

Korean name
- Hangul: 중의학
- Hanja: 中醫學
Transcriptions
- Revised Romanization: jung'uihak
- McCune–Reischauer: chung'ŭihak

Japanese name
- Hiragana: かんぽう
- Shinjitai: 漢方
Transcriptions
- Revised Hepburn: Kanpō
- Kunrei-shiki: Kanpô

Traditional Chinese medicine (TCM) is an alternative medical practice drawn from traditional medicine in China. A large share of its claims are pseudoscientific, with the majority of treatments having no robust evidence of effectiveness or logical mechanism of action. Some TCM ingredients are known to be toxic and cause disease, including cancer.

Medicine in traditional China encompassed a range of sometimes competing health and healing practices, folk beliefs, literati theory, Taoist and Confucian philosophy, herbal remedies, food, diet, exercise, medical specializations, and schools of thought. TCM as it exists today has been described as a largely 20th century invention. In the early twentieth century, Chinese cultural and political modernizers worked to eliminate traditional practices as backward and unscientific. Traditional practitioners then selected elements of philosophy and practice and organized them into what they called "Chinese medicine". In the 1950s, the Chinese government sought to revive traditional medicine (including legalizing previously banned practices) and sponsored the integration of Chinese and Western medicine. In the Cultural Revolution of the 1960s, the government promoted TCM as inexpensive and popular. This was largely spearheaded by Mao Zedong, despite the fact that, according to The Private Life of Chairman Mao, he did not believe in its effectiveness. After the opening of relations between the United States and China after 1972, there was great interest in the West for what is now called traditional Chinese medicine (TCM).

TCM is said to be based on such texts as Huangdi Neijing (The Inner Canon of the Yellow Emperor), and Compendium of Materia Medica, a sixteenth-century encyclopedic work, and includes various forms of herbal medicine, acupuncture, cupping therapy, gua sha, massage (tui na), bonesetter (die-da), exercise (qigong), and dietary therapy. TCM is widely used in the Sinosphere. One of the basic tenets is that the body's qi is circulating through channels called meridians having branches connected to bodily organs and functions. There is no evidence that meridians or vital energy exist. Concepts of the body and of disease used in TCM reflect its ancient origins and its emphasis on dynamic processes over material structure, similar to the humoral theory of ancient Greece and ancient Rome.

The demand for traditional medicines in China is a major generator of illegal wildlife smuggling, linked to the killing and smuggling of endangered animals. The Chinese authorities have engaged in attempts to crack down on illegal TCM-related wildlife smuggling.

== Ancient history ==
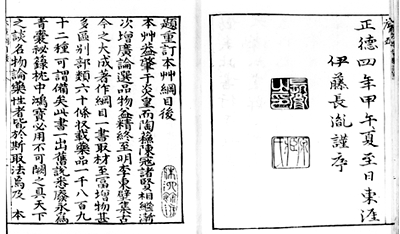
The Compendium of Materia Medica is a pharmaceutical text written by Li Shizhen (1518–1593) during the Ming dynasty of China. This edition was published in 1593.

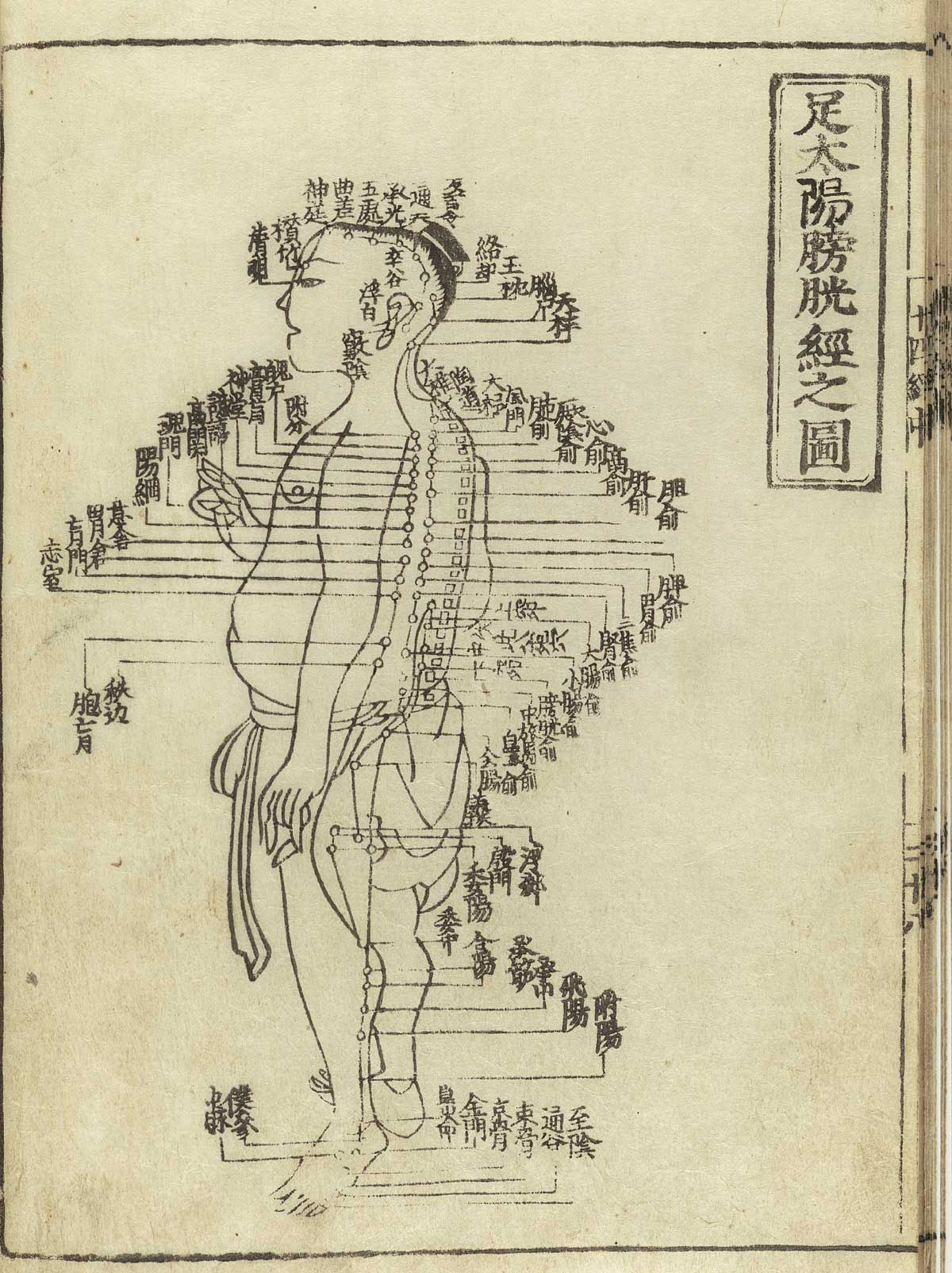
Acupuncture chart from Hua Shou (fl. 1340s, Yuan dynasty). This image from Shisi jingfahui (Expression of the Fourteen Meridians). (Tokyo: Suharaya Heisuke kanko, Kyoho gan 1716).

Scholars in the history of medicine in China distinguish its doctrines and practice from those of present-day TCM. J. A. Jewell and S. M. Hillier state that the term "Traditional Chinese Medicine" became an established term due to the work of Dr. Kan-Wen Ma, a Western-trained medical doctor who was persecuted during the Cultural Revolution and immigrated to Britain, joining the University of London's Wellcome Institute for the History of Medicine. Ian Johnson says, on the other hand, that the English-language term "traditional Chinese medicine" was coined by "party propagandists" in 1955.

Nathan Sivin criticizes attempts to treat medicine and medical practices in traditional China as if they were a single system. Instead, he says, there were 2,000 years of "medical system in turmoil" and speaks of a "myth of an unchanging medical tradition". He urges that "Traditional medicine translated purely into terms of modern medicine becomes partly nonsensical, partly irrelevant, and partly mistaken; that is also true the other way around, a point easily overlooked." TJ Hinrichs observes that people in modern Western societies divide healing practices into biomedicine for the body, psychology for the mind, and religion for the spirit, but these distinctions are inadequate to describe medical concepts among Chinese historically and to a considerable degree today.

The medical anthropologist Charles Leslie writes that Chinese, Greco-Arabic, and Indian traditional medicines were all grounded in systems of correspondence that aligned the organization of society, the universe, and the human body and other forms of life into an "all-embracing order of things". Each of these traditional systems was organized with such qualities as heat and cold, wet and dry, light and darkness, qualities that also align the seasons, compass directions, and the human cycle of birth, growth, and death. They provided, Leslie continued, a "comprehensive way of conceiving patterns that ran through all of nature," and they "served as a classificatory and mnemonic device to observe health problems and to reflect upon, store, and recover empirical knowledge," but they were also "subject to stultifying theoretical elaboration, self-deception, and dogmatism."

The doctrines of Chinese medicine are rooted in books such as the Yellow Emperor's Inner Canon and the Treatise on Cold Damage, as well as in cosmological notions such as yin–yang and the five phases. The Compendium of Materia Medica dates back to around 1,100 BCE when only a few dozen drugs were described. By the end of the 16th century, the number of drugs documented had reached close to 1,900. And by the end of the last century, published records of CMM had reached 12,800 drugs." Starting in the 1950s, these precepts were standardized in the People's Republic of China, including attempts to integrate them with modern notions of anatomy and pathology. In the 1950s, the Chinese government promoted a systematized form of TCM.

=== Shang dynasty ===
Traces of therapeutic activities in China date from the Shang dynasty (14th–11th centuries BCE). Though the Shang did not have a concept of "medicine" as distinct from other health practices, their oracular inscriptions on bones and tortoise shells refer to illnesses that affected the Shang royal family: eye disorders, toothaches, bloated abdomen, and such. Shang elites usually attributed them to curses sent by their ancestors. There is currently no evidence that the Shang nobility used herbal remedies.

Stone and bone needles found in ancient tombs led Joseph Needham to speculate that acupuncture might have been carried out in the Shang dynasty. This being said, most historians now make a distinction between medical lancing (or bloodletting) and acupuncture in the narrower sense of using metal needles to attempt to treat illnesses by stimulating points along circulation channels ("meridians") in accordance with beliefs related to the circulation of "Qi". The earliest evidence for acupuncture in this sense dates to the second or first century BCE.

=== Han dynasty ===
The Yellow Emperor's Inner Canon (Huangdi Neijing), the oldest received work of Chinese medical theory, was compiled during the Han dynasty around the first century BCE on the basis of shorter texts from different medical lineages. Written in the form of dialogues between the legendary Yellow Emperor and his ministers, it offers explanations on the relation between humans, their environment, and the cosmos, on the contents of the body, on human vitality and pathology, on the symptoms of illness, and on how to make diagnostic and therapeutic decisions in light of all these factors. Unlike earlier texts like Recipes for Fifty-Two Ailments, which was excavated in the 1970s from the Mawangdui tomb that had been sealed in 168 BCE, the Inner Canon rejected the influence of spirits and the use of magic. It was also one of the first books in which the cosmological doctrines of Yinyang and the Five Phases were brought to a mature synthesis.

The Treatise on Cold Damage Disorders and Miscellaneous Illnesses (Shang Han Lun) was collated by Zhang Zhongjing sometime between 196 and 220 CE; at the end of the Han dynasty. Focusing on drug prescriptions rather than acupuncture, it was the first medical work to combine Yinyang and the Five Phases with drug therapy. This formulary was also the earliest public Chinese medical text to group symptoms into clinically useful "patterns" (zheng 證) that could serve as targets for therapy. Having gone through numerous changes over time, the formulary now circulates as two distinct books: the Treatise on Cold Damage Disorders and the Essential Prescriptions of the Golden Casket, which were edited separately in the eleventh century, under the Song dynasty.

Nanjing or "Classic of Difficult Issues", originally called "The Yellow Emperor Eighty-one Nan Jing", ascribed to Bian Que in the eastern Han dynasty. This book was compiled in the form of question-and-answer explanations. A total of 81 questions have been discussed. Therefore, it is also called "Eighty-One Nan". The book is based on basic theory and has also analyzed some disease certificates. Questions one to twenty-two is about pulse study, questions twenty-three to twenty-nine is about meridian study, questions thirty to forty-seven is related to urgent illnesses, questions forty-eight to sixty-one is related to serious diseases, questions sixty-two to sixty-eight is related to acupuncture points, and questions sixty-nine to eighty-one is related to the needlepoint methods.

The book is credited as developing its own path, while also inheriting the theories from Huangdi Neijing. The content includes physiology, pathology, diagnosis, treatment contents, and a more essential and specific discussion of pulse diagnosis. It has become one of the four classics for Chinese medicine practitioners to learn from and has impacted the medical development in China.

Shennong Ben Cao Jing is one of the earliest written medical books in China. Written during the Eastern Han dynasty between 200 and 250 CE, it was the combined effort of practitioners in the Qin and Han dynasties who summarized, collected and compiled the results of pharmacological experience during their time periods. It was the first systematic summary of Chinese herbal medicine. Most of the pharmacological theories and compatibility rules and the proposed "seven emotions and harmony" principle have played a role in the practice of medicine for thousands of years. Therefore, it has been a textbook for medical workers in modern China. The full text of Shennong Ben Cao Jing in English can be found online.

=== Post-Han dynasty ===
In the centuries that followed, several shorter books tried to summarize or systematize the contents of the Yellow Emperor's Inner Canon. The Canon of Problems (probably second century CE) tried to reconcile divergent doctrines from the Inner Canon and developed a complete medical system centered on needling therapy. The AB Canon of Acupuncture and Moxibustion (Zhenjiu jiayi jing 針灸甲乙經, compiled by Huangfu Mi sometime between 256 and 282 CE) assembled a consistent body of doctrines concerning acupuncture; whereas the Canon of the Pulse (Maijing 脈經; c. 280) presented itself as a "comprehensive handbook of diagnostics and therapy."

Around 900–1000 AD, Chinese were the first to develop a form of vaccination, known as variolation or inoculation, to prevent smallpox. Chinese physicians had realised that when healthy people were exposed to smallpox scab tissue, they had a smaller chance of being infected by the disease later on. The common methods of inoculation at the time was through crushing smallpox scabs into powder and breathing it through the nose.

Prominent medical scholars of the post-Han period included Tao Hongjing (456–536), Sun Simiao of the Sui and Tang dynasties, Zhang Jiegu (c. 1151–1234), and Li Shizhen (1518–1593).

== Modern history ==
=== Chinese communities under colonial rule ===
Chinese communities living in colonial port cities were influenced by the diverse cultures they encountered, which also led to evolving understandings of medical practices where Chinese forms of medicine were combined with Western medical knowledge. For example, the Tung Wah Hospital was established in Hong Kong in 1869 based on the widespread rejection of Western medicine for pre-existing medical practices, although Western medicine would still be practiced in the hospital alongside Chinese medicinal practices. The Tung Wah Hospital was likely connected to another Chinese medical institution, the Kwong Wai Shiu Hospital of Singapore, which had previous community links to Tung Wah, was established for similar reasons, and also provided both Western and Chinese medical care. By 1935, English-language newspapers in Colonial Singapore already used the term "Traditional Chinese Medicine" to label Chinese ethnic medical practices.

In the Chinese Communist Party-controlled areas prior to the founding of the People's Republic of China, there was a lack of access to Western-style medical resources. To improve health care, the Chinese Communist Party (CCP) promoted the integration of traditional Chinese medicine with Western medical science. In the Yan'an Soviet, mass campaigns sought to "scientize Chinese medicine" and "make Western medicine Chinese."

=== People's Republic ===
In 1950, CCP chairman Mao Zedong announced support of traditional Chinese medicine; this was despite the fact that Mao did not personally believe in and did not use TCM, according to his personal physician Li Zhisui. In 1952, the president of the Chinese Medical Association said that, "This One Medicine, will possess a basis in modern natural sciences, will have absorbed the ancient and the new, the Chinese and the foreign, all medical achievements – and will be China's New Medicine!"

During the Cultural Revolution (1966–1976), the CCP and the government emphasized modernity, cultural identity, and China's social and economic reconstruction and contrasted them to the colonial and feudal past. The government established a grassroots health care system as a step in the search for a new national identity, tried to revitalize traditional medicine, and made large investments in traditional medicine to try to develop affordable medical care and public health facilities. The Ministry of Health directed health care throughout China and established primary care units. Chinese physicians trained in Western medicine were required to learn traditional medicine, while traditional healers received training in modern methods. This strategy aimed to integrate modern medical concepts and methods and revitalize appropriate aspects of traditional medicine. Therefore, traditional Chinese medicine was re-created in response to Western medicine.

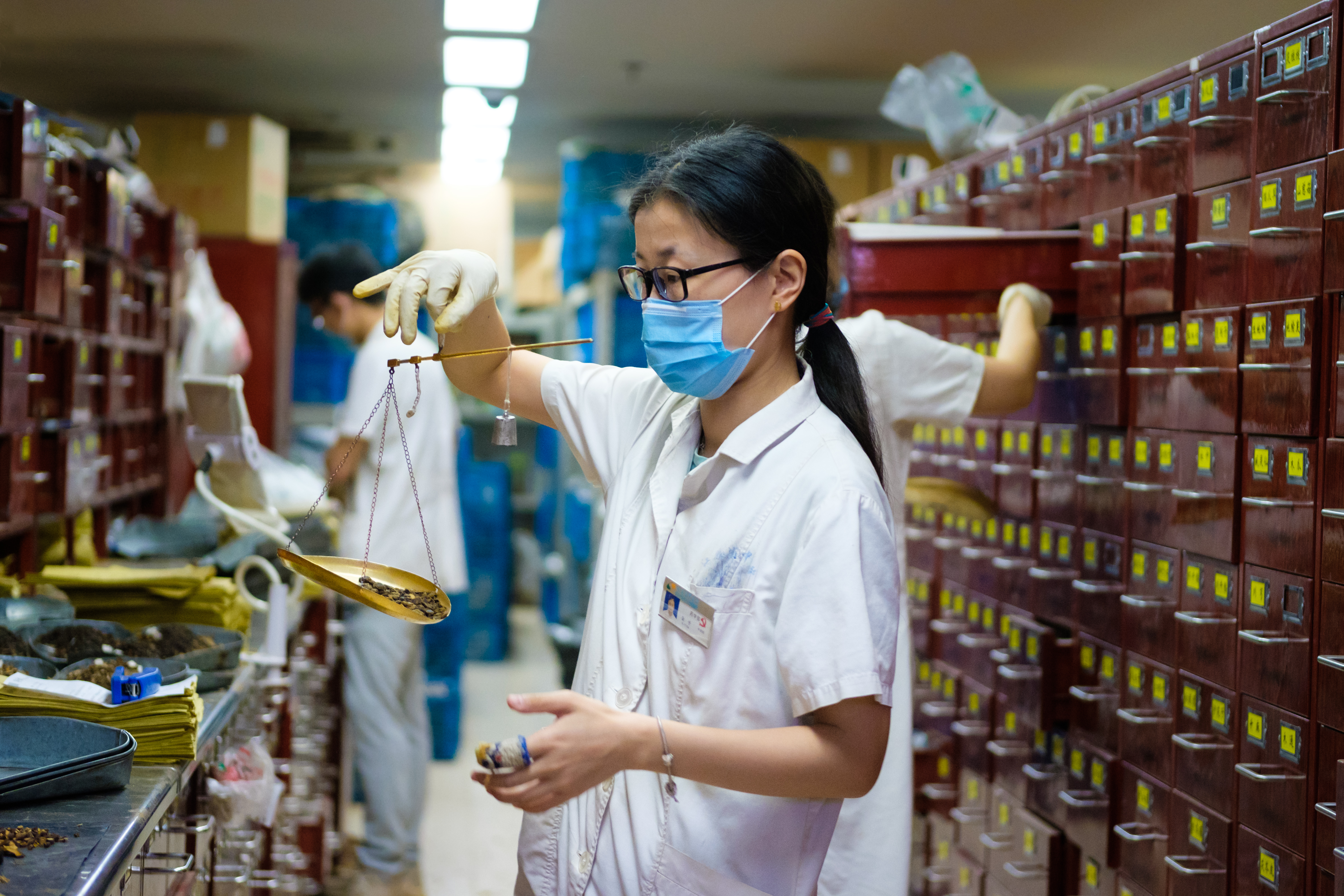
Apothecary mixing traditional Chinese medicine at Jiangsu Chinese Medical Hospital, Nanjing, China

In 1968, the CCP supported a new system of health care delivery for rural areas. Villages were assigned a barefoot doctor (a medical staff with basic medical skills and knowledge to deal with minor illnesses) responsible for basic medical care. The medical staff combined the values of traditional China with modern methods to provide health and medical care to poor farmers in remote rural areas. The barefoot doctors became a symbol of the Cultural Revolution, for the introduction of modern medicine into villages where traditional Chinese medicine services were used. The barefoot doctor system represents a hybrid of modern and traditional Chinese medicine (Chinese: 中西医结合; lit. 'Chinese western medicine combination', usually translated "Integrative Chinese Medicine"), a guiding principle that has far outlived the barefoot doctor system. Nathan Sivin's 1987 translation of Revised Outline of Chinese Medicine: For Western-medicine practitioners to learn Chinese medicine (新编中医学概要：供西医学习中医用; 1972) serves as a good, though outdated, example of this principle in practice.

The State Intellectual Property Office (now known as CNIPA) established a database of patents granted for traditional Chinese medicine.

In the second decade of the twenty-first century, Chinese Communist Party general secretary Xi Jinping strongly supported TCM, calling it a "gem". As of May 2011, in order to promote TCM worldwide, China had signed TCM partnership agreements with over 70 countries. His government pushed to increase its use and the number of TCM-trained doctors and announced that students of TCM would no longer be required to pass examinations in Western medicine. Chinese scientists and researchers, however, expressed concern that TCM training and therapies would receive equal support with Western medicine. They also criticized a reduction in government testing and regulation of the production of TCMs, some of which were toxic. Government censors have removed Internet posts that question TCM. In 2020 Beijing drafted a local regulation outlawing criticism of TCM. According to Caixin, the regulation was later passed with the provision outlawing criticism of TCM removed.

Traditional Chinese Medicine does not reflect ancient medical practice, instead being a modern selection from very diverse traditions, with "a minimal vestige of ideas and practices" having been retained from them.

=== Hong Kong ===
At the beginning of Hong Kong's opening up, Western medicine was not yet popular, and Western medicine doctors were mostly foreigners; local residents mostly relied on Chinese medicine practitioners. In 1841, the British government of Hong Kong issued an announcement pledging to govern Hong Kong residents in accordance with all the original rituals, customs and private legal property rights. As traditional Chinese medicine had always been used in China, the use of traditional Chinese medicine was not regulated.

The establishment in 1870 of the Tung Wah Hospital was the first use of Chinese medicine for the treatment in Chinese hospitals providing free medical services. As the promotion of Western medicine by the British government started from 1940, Western medicine started being popular among Hong Kong population. In 1959, Hong Kong had researched the use of traditional Chinese medicine to replace Western medicine.

=== Historiography of Chinese medicine ===
The study of traditional medicine in China is an academic field within the history of science, with its own scholarly associations, journals, graduate programs, and debates with each other. These scholars distinguish traditional medicine in historical China from the more recent traditional Chinese medicine (TCM), which took elements from traditional texts and practices to construct a systematic body. Paul Unschuld, for instance, sees a "departure of TCM from its historical origins." What is called "Traditional Chinese Medicine" and practiced today in China and the West is not thousands of years old, but recently constructed using selected traditional terms, some of which have been taken out of context, some badly misunderstood. He has criticized Chinese and Western popular books for selective use of evidence, choosing only those works or parts of historical works that seem to lead to modern medicine, ignoring those elements that do not now seem to be effective.

Historians have noted two key aspects of Chinese medical history: understanding conceptual differences when translating the term 身, and observing the history from the perspective of cosmology rather than biology.

In Chinese classical texts, the term 身 is the closest historical translation to the English word "body" because it sometimes refers to the physical human body in terms of being weighed or measured, but the term is to be understood as an "ensemble of functions" encompassing both the human psyche and emotions. This concept of the human body is opposed to the European duality of a separate mind and body. It is critical for scholars to understand the fundamental differences in concepts of the body in order to connect the medical theory of the classics to the "human organism" it is explaining.

Chinese scholars established a correlation between the cosmos and the "human organism". The basic components of cosmology, qi, yin yang and the Five Phase theory, were used to explain health and disease in texts such as Huangdi neijing. Yin and yang are the changing factors in cosmology, with qi as the vital force or energy of life. The Five Phase theory (Wuxing) of the Han dynasty contains the elements wood, fire, earth, metal, and water. By understanding medicine from a cosmology perspective, historians better understand Chinese medical and social classifications, such as gender, which was defined by a domination or remission of yang in terms of yin.

These two distinctions are imperative when analyzing the history of traditional Chinese medical science.

A majority of Chinese medical history written after the classical canons comes in the form of primary source case studies where academic physicians record the illness of a particular person and the healing techniques used, as well as their effectiveness. Historians have noted that Chinese scholars wrote these studies instead of "books of prescriptions or advice manuals." In their historical and environmental understanding, no two illnesses were alike, so the healing strategies of the practitioner were unique every time to the specific diagnosis of the patient. Medical case studies existed throughout Chinese history, but "individually authored and published case history" was a prominent creation of the Ming dynasty. An example of such case studies would be the literati physician, Cheng Congzhou, collection of 93 cases published in 1644.

== Critiques ==
Critics say that TCM theory and practice have no basis in modern science, and that TCM practitioners do not agree on what diagnosis and treatments should be used for any given person. A 2007 editorial in the journal Nature wrote that TCM "remains poorly researched and supported, and most of its treatments have no logical mechanism of action." It also described TCM as "fraught with pseudoscience". A review of the literature in 2008 found that scientists are "still unable to find a shred of evidence" according to standards of science-based medicine for traditional Chinese concepts such as qi, meridians, and acupuncture points, and that the traditional principles of acupuncture are deeply flawed. "Acupuncture points and meridians are not a reality", the review continued, but "merely the product of an ancient Chinese philosophy". In June 2019, the World Health Organization included traditional Chinese medicine in a global diagnostic compendium, but a spokesman said this was "not an endorsement of the scientific validity of any Traditional Medicine practice or the efficacy of any Traditional Medicine intervention."

A 2012 review of cost-effectiveness research for TCM found that studies had low levels of evidence, with no beneficial outcomes. Pharmaceutical research on the potential for creating new drugs from traditional remedies has had few successful results. Proponents suggest that research has so far missed key features of the art of TCM, such as unknown interactions between various ingredients and complex interactive biological systems. One of the basic tenets of TCM is that the body's qi (sometimes translated as vital energy) is circulating through channels called meridians having branches connected to bodily organs and functions. The concept of vital energy is pseudoscientific. Concepts of the body and of disease used in TCM reflect its ancient origins and its emphasis on dynamic processes over material structure, similar to Classical humoral theory.

TCM has also been controversial within China. In 2006, the Chinese philosopher Zhang Gongyao triggered a national debate with an article entitled "Farewell to Traditional Chinese Medicine", arguing that TCM was a pseudoscience that should be abolished in public healthcare and academia. The Chinese government took the stance that TCM is a science and continued to encourage its development.

There are concerns about a number of potentially toxic plants, animal parts, and mineral compounds from China, as well as the facilitation of disease. Trafficked and farm-raised animals used in TCM are a source of several fatal zoonotic diseases. There are additional concerns over the illegal trade and transport of endangered species including rhinoceroses and tigers, and the welfare of specially farmed animals, including bears.

Many TCM remedies are effective because they are combined with modern Western medicine. An example is the popular over-the-counter cold medication Ganmaoling Keli (Chinese: 感冒灵颗粒; pinyin: Gǎnmàolíng Kēlì; lit. 'Cold Relief Granules'), which contains 200 mg of paracetamol, 4 mg of caffeine and 4 mg of chlorpheniramine maleate, which are standard ingredients in many Western over-the-counter cold medications.

== Philosophical background ==
Traditional Chinese medicine includes a broad range of practices sharing common concepts that developed in China for more than 2,000 years, including various forms of herbal medicine, acupuncture, massage (tui na), exercise (qigong), and dietary therapy. It is primarily used as a complementary alternative medicine approach. Traditional practices are widely used in China and, in an adapted form, also in the West. Its philosophy is based on School of Yin Yang, which incorporates Five Phases theory and Yin–Yang theory, and elements of which were absorbed by Daoism. Philosophical texts influenced medical thought and practice, mostly by being grounded in the same theories of qi, yin-yang and wuxing and microcosm-macrocosm analogies.

Yin and yang symbol for balance. In traditional Chinese Medicine, good health is believed to be achieved by various balances, including a balance between yin and yang.

=== Yin and yang ===
Yin and yang are ancient Chinese deductive reasoning concepts used within Chinese medical diagnosis which can be traced back to the Shang dynasty (1600–1100 BCE). They represent two abstract and complementary aspects that every phenomenon in the universe can be divided into. Primordial analogies for these aspects are the sun-facing (yang) and the shady (yin) side of a hill. Two other commonly used representational allegories of yin and yang are water and fire. In the yin–yang theory, detailed attributions are made regarding the yin or yang character of things:

| Phenomenon | Yin | Yang |
|---|---|---|
| Celestial bodies | moon | sun |
| Gender | female | male |
| Location | inside | outside |
| Temperature | cold | hot |
| Direction | downward | upward |
| Degree of humidity | damp/moist | dry |

The concept of yin and yang is also applicable to the human body; for example, the upper part of the body and the back are assigned to yang, while the lower part of the body is believed to have the yin character. Yin and yang characterization also extends to the various body functions, and – more importantly – to disease symptoms (e.g., cold and heat sensations are assumed to be yin and yang symptoms, respectively). Thus, yin and yang of the body are seen as phenomena whose lack (or over-abundance) comes with characteristic symptom combinations:

- Yin vacuity (also termed "vacuity-heat"): heat sensations, possible sweating at night, insomnia, dry pharynx, dry mouth, dark urine, and a "fine" and rapid pulse.
- Yang vacuity ("vacuity-cold"): aversion to cold, cold limbs, bright white complexion, long voidings of clear urine, diarrhea, pale and enlarged tongue, and a slightly weak, slow and fine pulse.

TCM also identifies drugs believed to treat these specific symptom combinations, i.e., to reinforce yin and yang.

Interactions of Wu Xing

| Phenomenon | Wood | Fire | Earth | Metal | Water |
|---|---|---|---|---|---|
| Direction | East | South | Centre | West | North |
| Colour | green/violet | red/purple | yellow/pink | white | black |
| Climate | wind | heat | damp | dryness | cold |
| Taste | sour | bitter | sweet | acrid | salty |
| Zang Organ | Liver | Heart | Spleen | Lung | Kidney |
| Fu Organ | Gallbladder | Small intestine | Stomach | Large intestine | Bladder |
| Sense organ | eye | tongue | mouth | nose | ears |
| Facial part | above bridge of nose | between eyes, lower part | bridge of nose | between eyes, middle part | cheeks (below cheekbone) |
| Eye part | iris | inner/outer corner of the eye | upper and lower lid | sclera | pupil |

Strict rules are identified to apply to the relationships between the Five Phases in terms of sequence, of acting on each other, of counteraction, etc. All these aspects of Five Phases theory constitute the basis of the zàng-fǔ concept, and thus have great influence regarding the TCM model of the body. Five Phase theory is also applied in diagnosis and therapy.

Correspondences between the body and the universe have historically not only been seen in terms of the Five Elements, but also of the "Great Numbers" (大數; dà shū) For example, the number of acu-points has at times been seen to be 365, corresponding with the number of days in a year; and the number of main meridians–12–has been seen as corresponding with the number of rivers flowing through the ancient Chinese empire.

== Model of the body ==
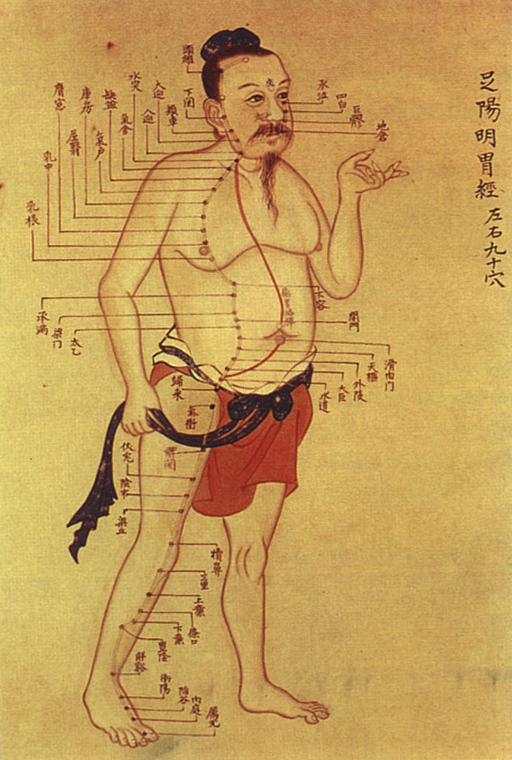
Old Chinese medical chart on acupuncture meridians

TCM "holds that the body's vital energy (chi or qi) circulates through channels, called jingluo ("meridians and collaterals"), that have branches connected to bodily organs and functions." Its view of the human body is only marginally concerned with anatomical structures, but focuses primarily on the body's functions (such as digestion, breathing, temperature maintenance, etc.):

These functions are aggregated and then associated with a primary functional entity – for instance, nourishment of the tissues and maintenance of their moisture are seen as connected functions, and the entity postulated to be responsible for these functions is xiě (blood). These functional entities thus constitute concepts rather than something with biochemical or anatomical properties.

The primary functional entities used by traditional Chinese medicine are qì, xuě, the five zàng organs, the six fǔ organs, and the meridians which extend through the organ systems. These are all theoretically interconnected: each zàng organ is paired with a fǔ organ, which are nourished by the blood and concentrate qi for a particular function, with meridians being extensions of those functional systems throughout the body.

Concepts of the body and of disease used in TCM are pseudoscientific, similar to Mediterranean humoral theory. TCM's model of the body is characterized as full of pseudoscience. Some practitioners no longer consider yin and yang and the idea of an energy flow to apply. Scientific investigation has not found any histological or physiological evidence for traditional Chinese concepts such as qi, meridians, and acupuncture points. (Note: Singh & Ernst (2008) stated, "Scientists are still unable to find a shred of evidence to support the existence of meridians or Ch'i", "The traditional principles of acupuncture are deeply flawed, as there is no evidence at all to demonstrate the existence of Ch'i or meridians" and "Acupuncture points and meridians are not a reality, but merely the product of an ancient Chinese philosophy".) It is a generally held belief within the acupuncture community that acupuncture points and meridians structures are special conduits for electrical signals but no research has established any consistent anatomical structure or function for either acupuncture points or meridians. The scientific evidence for the anatomical existence of either meridians or acupuncture points is not compelling. Stephen Barrett of Quackwatch writes that, "TCM theory and practice are not based upon the body of knowledge related to health, disease, and health care that has been widely accepted by the scientific community. TCM practitioners disagree among themselves about how to diagnose patients and which treatments should go with which diagnoses. Even if they could agree, the TCM theories are so nebulous that no amount of scientific study will enable TCM to offer rational care."

=== Qi ===
Qi is a polysemous word that traditional Chinese medicine distinguishes as being able to transform into many different qualities of qi (气; 氣; qì). In a general sense, qi is something that is defined by five "cardinal functions":

1. Actuation (推动; 推動; tuīdòng) – of all physical processes in the body, especially the circulation of all body fluids such as blood in their vessels. This includes actuation of the functions of the zang-fu organs and meridians.
2. Warming (温煦; 溫煦; wēnxù) – the body, especially the limbs.
3. Defense (防御; fángyù) – against Exogenous Pathogenic Factors
4. Containment (固摄; 固攝; gùshè) – of body fluids, i.e., keeping blood, sweat, urine, semen, etc. from leakage or excessive emission.
5. Inter-transformationel (气化; 氣化; qìhuà) – of food, drink, and breath into qi, xue (blood), and jinye ("fluids"), and/or transformation of all of the latter into each other.

A lack of qi will be characterized especially by pale complexion, lassitude of spirit, lack of strength, spontaneous sweating, laziness to speak, non-digestion of food, shortness of breath (especially on exertion), and a pale and enlarged tongue.

Qi is believed to be partially generated from food and drink, and partially from air (by breathing). Another considerable part of it is inherited from the parents and will be consumed in the course of life.

TCM uses special terms for qi running inside of the blood vessels and for qi that is distributed in the skin, muscles, and tissues between them. The former is called yingqi (营气; 營氣; yíngqì); its function is to complement xuè and its nature has a strong yin aspect (although qi in general is considered to be yang). The latter is called weiqi (卫气; 衛氣; weìqì); its main function is defence and it has pronounced yang nature.

Qi is said to circulate in the meridians. Just as the qi held by each of the zang-fu organs, this is considered to be part of the 'principal' qi of the body. (Note: 元气; 元氣; yuánqì, also known as "true" qi (真气; 真氣; zhēnqì) or "original" qi (原气; 原氣; yuánqì).)

=== Xie ===
In contrast to the majority of other functional entities, xuè or xiě (血, "blood") is correlated with a physical form – the red liquid running in the blood vessels. Its concept is, nevertheless, defined by its functions: nourishing all parts and tissues of the body, safeguarding an adequate degree of moisture, and sustaining and soothing both consciousness and sleep.

Typical symptoms of a lack of xiě (usually termed "blood vacuity" [血虚; xiě xū]) are described as: Pale-white or withered-yellow complexion, dizziness, flowery vision, palpitations, insomnia, numbness of the extremities; pale tongue; "fine" pulse.

=== Jinye ===
Closely related to xuě are the jinye (津液; jīnyè, usually translated as "body fluids"), and just like xuě they are considered to be yin in nature, and defined first and foremost by the functions of nurturing and moisturizing the different structures of the body. Their other functions are to harmonize yin and yang, and to help with the secretion of waste products.

Jinye are ultimately extracted from food and drink, and constitute the raw material for the production of xuě; conversely, xuě can also be transformed into jinye. Their palpable manifestations are all bodily fluids: tears, sputum, saliva, gastric acid, joint fluid, sweat, urine, etc.

=== Zangfu ===
The zangfu (脏腑; 臟腑; zàngfǔ) are the collective name of eleven entities (similar to organs) that constitute the centre piece of TCM's systematization of bodily functions. The term zang refers to the five considered to be yin in nature – Heart, Liver, Spleen, Lung, Kidney – while fu refers to the six associated with yang – Small Intestine, Large Intestine, Gallbladder, Urinary Bladder, Stomach and San Jiao. Despite having the names of organs, they are only loosely tied to (rudimentary) anatomical assumptions. Instead, they are primarily understood to be certain "functions" of the body. To highlight the fact that they are not equivalent to anatomical organs, their names are usually capitalized.

The zang's essential functions consist in production and storage of qi and xuě; they are said to regulate digestion, breathing, water metabolism, the musculoskeletal system, the skin, the sense organs, aging, emotional processes, and mental activity, among other structures and processes. The fǔ organs' main purpose is merely to transmit and digest (傳化; chuán-huà) substances such as waste and food.

Since their concept was developed on the basis of Wǔ Xíng philosophy, each zàng is paired with a fǔ, and each zàng-fǔ pair is assigned to one of five elemental qualities (i.e., the Five Elements or Five Phases). These correspondences are stipulated as:

- Fire (火) = Heart (心; xīn) and Small Intestine (小腸; xiaǒcháng) (and, secondarily, Sānjiaō [三焦, "Triple Burner"] and Pericardium [心包; xīnbaò])
- Earth (土) = Spleen (脾; pí) and Stomach (胃; weì)
- Metal (金) = Lung (肺; feì) and Large Intestine (大腸; dàcháng)
- Water (水) = Kidney (腎; shèn) and Bladder (膀胱; pángguāng)
- Wood (木) = Liver (肝; gān) and Gallbladder (膽; dān)

The zàng-fǔ are also connected to the twelve standard meridians – each yang meridian is attached to a fǔ organ, and five of the yin meridians are attached to a zàng. As there are only five zàng but six yin meridians, the sixth is assigned to the Pericardium, a peculiar entity almost similar to the Heart zàng.

=== Jing-luo ===
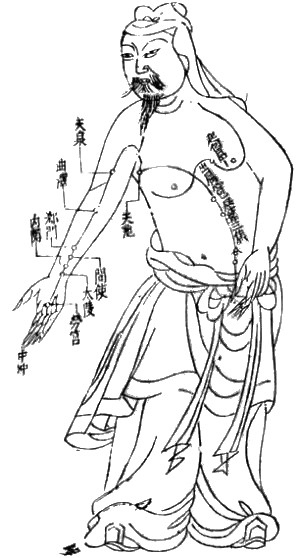
Acupuncture chart from the Ming dynasty (c. 1368–1644)

The meridians (经络, jīng-luò) are believed to be channels running from the zàng-fǔ in the interior (里, lǐ) of the body to the limbs and joints ("the surface" [表, biaǒ]), transporting qi and xuĕ. TCM identifies 12 "regular" and 8 "extraordinary" meridians; the Chinese terms being 十二经脉 (shí-èr jīngmài, lit. "the Twelve Vessels") and 奇经八脉 (qí jīng bā mài) respectively. There's also a number of less customary channels branching from the "regular" meridians.

== Gender in traditional medicine ==
Fuke (妇科; 婦科; Fùkē) is the traditional Chinese term for women's medicine (it means gynecology and obstetrics in modern medicine). However, there are few or no ancient works on it except for Fu Qingzhu's Fu Qingzhu Nu Ke (Fu Qingzhu's Gynecology 傅青主女科), with "Nu Ke" literally meaning "Women studies", much like the etymology of gynecology. In traditional China, as in many other cultures, the health and medicine of female bodies was less understood than that of male bodies. Women's bodies were often secondary to male bodies, since women were thought of as the weaker, sicklier sex.

In clinical encounters, women and men were treated differently. Diagnosing women was not as simple as diagnosing men. First, when a woman fell ill, an appropriate adult man was to call the doctor and remain present during the examination, for the woman could not be left alone with the male doctor. The physician would discuss the female's problems and diagnosis only through the male. However, in certain cases, when a woman dealt with complications of pregnancy or birth, older women assumed the role of the formal authority. Men in these situations would not have much power to interfere. Second, women were often silent about their issues with doctors due to the societal expectation of female modesty when a male figure was in the room. Third, patriarchal society also caused doctors to call women and children patients "the anonymous category of family members (Jia Ren) or household (Ju Jia)" in their journals. This anonymity and lack of conversation between the doctor and woman patient led to the inquiry diagnosis of the Four Diagnostic Methods being the most challenging. Doctors used a medical doll known as a Doctor's lady, on which female patients could indicate the location of their symptoms.

Cheng Maoxian (b. 1581), who practiced medicine in Yangzhou, described the difficulties doctors had with the norm of female modesty. One of his case studies was that of Fan Jisuo's teenage daughter, who could not be diagnosed because she was unwilling to speak about her symptoms, since the illness involved discharge from her intimate areas. As Cheng describes, there were four standard methods of diagnosis – looking, asking, listening and smelling and touching (for pulse-taking). To maintain some form of modesty, women would often stay hidden behind curtains and screens. The doctor was allowed to touch enough of her body to complete his examination, often just the pulse taking. This would lead to situations where the symptoms and the doctor's diagnosis did not agree and the doctor would have to ask to view more of the patient.

These social and cultural beliefs were often barriers to learning more about female health. Women were often uncomfortable talking about their illnesses, especially in front of the male chaperones that attended medical examinations. Women would choose to omit certain symptoms as a means of upholding their chastity and honor. One such example is the case in which a teenage girl was unable to be diagnosed because she failed to mention her symptom of vaginal discharge. Silence was their way of maintaining control in these situations, but it often came at the expense of their health and the advancement of female health and medicine. This silence and control were most obviously seen when the health problem was related to the core of Ming fuke, or the sexual body. It was often in these diagnostic settings that women would choose silence. In addition, there would be a conflict between patient and doctor on the probability of her diagnosis. For example, a woman who thought herself to be past the point of child-bearing age, might not believe a doctor who diagnoses her as pregnant. This only resulted in more conflict.

=== Yin yang and gender ===
Yin and yang were critical to the understanding of women's bodies, but understood only in conjunction with male bodies. Yin and yang ruled the body, the body being a microcosm of the universe and the earth. In addition, gender in the body was understood as homologous, the two genders operating in synchronization. Gender was presumed to influence the movement of energy and a well-trained physician would be expected to read the pulse and be able to identify two dozen or more energy flows. Yin and yang concepts were applied to the feminine and masculine aspects of all bodies, implying that the differences between men and women begin at the level of this energy flow. According to Bequeathed Writings of Master Chu the male's yang pulse movement follows an ascending path in "compliance [with cosmic direction] so that the cycle of circulation in the body and the Vital Gate are felt...The female's yin pulse movement follows a defending path against the direction of cosmic influences, so that the nadir and the Gate of Life are felt at the inch position of the left hand". In sum, classical medicine marked yin and yang as high and low on bodies which in turn would be labeled normal or abnormal and gendered either male or female.

Bodily functions could be categorized through systems, not organs. In many drawings and diagrams, the twelve channels and their visceral systems were organized by yin and yang, an organization that was identical in female and male bodies. Female and male bodies were no different on the plane of yin and yang. Their gendered differences were not acknowledged in diagrams of the human body. Medical texts such as the Yuzuan yizong jinjian were filled with illustrations of male bodies or androgynous bodies that did not display gendered characteristics.

As in other cultures, fertility and menstruation dominate female health concerns. Since male and female bodies were governed by the same forces, traditional Chinese medicine did not recognize the womb as the place of reproduction. The abdominal cavity presented pathologies that were similar in both men and women, which included tumors, growths, hernias, and swellings of the genitals. The "master system", as Charlotte Furth calls it, is the kidney visceral system, which governed reproductive functions. Therefore, it was not the anatomical structures that allowed for pregnancy, but the difference in processes that allowed for the condition of pregnancy to occur.

=== Pregnancy ===
Traditional Chinese medicine's dealings with pregnancy are documented from at least the seventeenth century. According to Charlotte Furth, "a pregnancy (in the seventeenth century) as a known bodily experience emerged [...] out of the liminality of menstrual irregularity, as uneasy digestion, and a sense of fullness". These symptoms were common among other illness as well, so the diagnosis of pregnancy often came late in the term. The Canon of the Pulse, which described the use of pulse in diagnosis, stated that pregnancy was "a condition marked by symptoms of the disorder in one whose pulse is normal" or "where the pulse and symptoms do not agree". Women were often silent about suspected pregnancy, which led to many men not knowing that their wife or daughter was pregnant until complications arrived. Complications through the misdiagnosis and the woman's reluctance to speak often led to medically induced abortions. Cheng Maoxian, Furth wrote, "was unapologetic about endangering a fetus when pregnancy risked a mother's well being". The method of abortion was the ingestion of certain herbs and foods. Disappointment at the loss of the fetus often led to family discord.

=== Postpartum ===
If the baby and mother survived the term of the pregnancy, childbirth was then the next step. The tools provided for birth were: towels to catch the blood, a container for the placenta, a pregnancy sash to support the belly, and an infant swaddling wrap. With these tools, the baby was born, cleaned, and swaddled; however, the mother was then immediately the focus of the doctor to replenish her qi. In his writings, Cheng Maoxian places a large amount of emphasis on the Four Diagnostic methods to deal with postpartum issues and instructs all physicians to "not neglect any [of the four methods]". The process of birthing was thought to deplete a woman's blood level and qi so the most common treatments for postpartum were food (commonly garlic and ginseng), medicine, and rest. This process was followed up by a month check-in with the physician, a practice known as zuo yuezi.

=== Infertility ===
Infertility, not very well understood, posed serious social and cultural repercussions. The seventh-century scholar Sun Simiao is often quoted: "those who have prescriptions for women's distinctiveness take their differences of pregnancy, childbirth and [internal] bursting injuries as their basis." Even in contemporary fuke placing emphasis on reproductive functions, rather than the entire health of the woman, suggests that the main function of fuke is to produce children.

Once again, the kidney visceral system governs the "source Qi", which governs the reproductive systems in both sexes. This source Qi was thought to "be slowly depleted through sexual activity, menstruation and childbirth." It was also understood that the depletion of source Qi could result from the movement of an external pathology that moved through the outer visceral systems before causing more permanent damage to the home of source Qi, the kidney system. In addition, the view that only very serious ailments ended in the damage of this system means that those who had trouble with their reproductive systems or fertility were seriously ill.

According to traditional Chinese medical texts, infertility can be summarized into different syndrome types. These were spleen and kidney depletion (yang depletion), liver and kidney depletion (yin depletion), blood depletion, phlegm damp, liver oppression, and damp heat. This is important because, while most other issues were complex in Chinese medical physiology, women's fertility issues were simple. Most syndrome types revolved around menstruation, or lack thereof. The patient was entrusted with recording not only the frequency, but also the "volume, color, consistency, and odor of menstrual flow." This placed responsibility of symptom recording on the patient, and was compounded by the earlier discussed issue of female chastity and honor. This meant that diagnosing female infertility was difficult, because the only symptoms that were recorded and monitored by the physician were the pulse and color of the tongue.

== Concept of disease ==
In general, disease is perceived as a disharmony (or imbalance) in the functions or interactions of yin, yang, qi, xuĕ, zàng-fǔ, meridians etc. and/or of the interaction between the human body and the environment. Therapy is based on which "pattern of disharmony" can be identified. Thus, "pattern discrimination" is the most important step in TCM diagnosis. It is also known to be the most difficult aspect of practicing TCM.

To determine which pattern is at hand, practitioners will examine things like the color and shape of the tongue, the relative strength of pulse-points, the smell of the breath, the quality of breathing or the sound of the voice. For example, depending on tongue and pulse conditions, a TCM practitioner might diagnose bleeding from the mouth and nose as: "Liver fire rushes upwards and scorches the Lung, injuring the blood vessels and giving rise to reckless pouring of blood from the mouth and nose." He might then go on to prescribe treatments designed to clear heat or supplement the Lung.

=== Disease entities ===
In TCM, a disease has two aspects: "bìng" and "zhèng". The former is often translated as "disease entity", "disease category", "illness", or simply "diagnosis". The latter, and more important one, is usually translated as "pattern" (or sometimes also as "syndrome"). For example, the disease entity of a common cold might present with a pattern of wind-cold in one person, and with the pattern of wind-heat in another.

From a scientific point of view, most of the disease entities (病; bìng) listed by TCM constitute symptoms. Examples include headache, cough, abdominal pain, constipation etc.

Since therapy will not be chosen according to the disease entity but according to the pattern, two people with the same disease entity but different patterns will receive different therapy. Vice versa, people with similar patterns might receive similar therapy even if their disease entities are different. This is called yì bìng tóng zhì, tóng bìng yì zhì (异病同治，同病异治; 'different diseases same treatment', 'same disease different treatments').

=== Patterns ===
In TCM, "pattern" (证; zhèng) refers to a "pattern of disharmony" or "functional disturbance" within the functional entities of which the TCM model of the body is composed. There are disharmony patterns of qi, xuě, the body fluids, the zàng-fǔ, and the meridians. They are ultimately defined by their symptoms and signs (i.e., for example, pulse and tongue findings).

In clinical practice, the identified pattern usually involves a combination of affected entities (compare with typical examples of patterns). The concrete pattern identified should account for all the symptoms a person has.

==== Six Excesses ====
The Six Excesses (六淫; liù yín, sometimes also translated as "Pathogenic Factors", or "Six Pernicious Influences"; with the alternative term of 六邪; liù xié, – "Six Evils" or "Six Devils") are allegorical terms used to describe disharmony patterns displaying certain typical symptoms. These symptoms resemble the effects of six climatic factors. In the allegory, these symptoms can occur because one or more of those climatic factors (called 六气; liù qì, "the six qi") were able to invade the body surface and to proceed to the interior. This is sometimes used to draw causal relationships (i.e., prior exposure to wind/cold/etc. is identified as the cause of a disease), while other authors explicitly deny a direct cause-effect relationship between weather conditions and disease, pointing out that the Six Excesses are primarily descriptions of a certain combination of symptoms translated into a pattern of disharmony. It is undisputed, though, that the Six Excesses can manifest inside the body without an external cause. In this case, they might be denoted "internal", e.g., "internal wind" or "internal fire (or heat)".

The Six Excesses and their characteristic clinical signs are:

1. Wind (风; fēng): rapid onset of symptoms, wandering location of symptoms, itching, nasal congestion, "floating" pulse; tremor, paralysis, convulsion.
2. Cold (寒; hán): cold sensations, aversion to cold, relief of symptoms by warmth, watery/clear excreta, severe pain, abdominal pain, contracture/hypertonicity of muscles, (slimy) white tongue fur, "deep"/"hidden" or "string-like" pulse, or slow pulse.
3. Fire/Heat (火; huǒ): aversion to heat, high fever, thirst, concentrated urine, red face, red tongue, yellow tongue fur, rapid pulse. (Fire and heat are basically seen to be the same)
4. Dampness (湿; shī): sensation of heaviness, sensation of fullness, symptoms of Spleen dysfunction, greasy tongue fur, "slippery" pulse.
5. Dryness (燥; zào): dry cough, dry mouth, dry throat, dry lips, nosebleeds, dry skin, dry stools.
6. Summerheat (暑; shǔ): either heat or mixed damp-heat symptoms.

Six-Excesses-patterns can consist of only one or a combination of Excesses (e.g., wind-cold, wind-damp-heat). They can also transform from one into another.

==== Typical examples of patterns ====
For each of the functional entities (qi, xuĕ, zàng-fǔ, meridians etc.), typical disharmony patterns are recognized; for example: qi vacuity and qi stagnation in the case of qi; blood vacuity, blood stasis, and blood heat in the case of xuĕ; Spleen qi vacuity, Spleen yang vacuity, Spleen qi vacuity with down-bearing qi, Spleen qi vacuity with lack of blood containment, cold-damp invasion of the Spleen, damp-heat invasion of Spleen and Stomach in case of the Spleen zàng; wind/cold/damp invasion in the case of the meridians.

TCM gives detailed prescriptions of these patterns regarding their typical symptoms, mostly including characteristic tongue and/or pulse findings. For example:

- "Upflaming Liver fire" (肝火上炎; gānhuǒ shàng yán): Headache, red face, reddened eyes, dry mouth, nosebleeds, constipation, dry or hard stools, profuse menstruation, sudden tinnitus or deafness, vomiting of sour or bitter fluids, expectoration of blood, irascibility, impatience; red tongue with dry yellow fur; slippery and string-like pulse.

==== Eight principles of diagnosis ====
The process of determining which actual pattern is on hand is called 辩证 (biàn zhèng, usually translated as "pattern diagnosis", "pattern identification" or "pattern discrimination"). Generally, the first and most important step in pattern diagnosis is an evaluation of the present signs and symptoms on the basis of the "Eight Principles" (八纲; bā gāng). These eight principles refer to four pairs of fundamental qualities of a disease: exterior/interior, heat/cold, vacuity/repletion, and yin/yang. Out of these, heat/cold and vacuity/repletion have the biggest clinical importance. The yin/yang quality, on the other side, has the smallest importance and is somewhat seen aside from the other three pairs, since it merely presents a general and vague conclusion regarding what other qualities are found. In detail, the Eight Principles refer to the following:

- Yin and yang are universal aspects all things can be classified under, this includes diseases in general as well as the Eight Principles' first three couples. For example, cold is identified to be a yin aspect, while heat is attributed to yang. Since descriptions of patterns in terms of yin and yang lack complexity and clinical practicality, though, patterns are usually not labeled this way anymore. Exceptions are vacuity-cold and repletion-heat patterns, who are sometimes referred to as "yin patterns" and "yang patterns" respectively.
- Exterior (表; biǎo) refers to a disease manifesting in the superficial layers of the body – skin, hair, flesh, and meridians. It is characterized by aversion to cold and/or wind, headache, muscle ache, mild fever, a "floating" pulse, and a normal tongue appearance.
- Interior (里; lǐ) refers to disease manifestation in the zàng-fǔ, or (in a wider sense) to any disease that can not be counted as exterior. There are no generalized characteristic symptoms of interior patterns, since they'll be determined by the affected zàng or fǔ entity.
- Cold (寒; hán) is generally characterized by aversion to cold, absence of thirst, and a white tongue fur. More detailed characterization depends on whether cold is coupled with vacuity or repletion.
- Heat (热; rè) is characterized by an absence of aversion to cold, a red and painful throat, a dry tongue fur and a rapid and floating pulse if it falls together with an exterior pattern. In all other cases, symptoms depend on whether heat is coupled with vacuity or repletion.
- Deficiency (虚; xū), can be further differentiated into deficiency of qi, xuě, yin and yang, with all their respective characteristic symptoms. Yin deficiency can also cause "empty-heat".
- Excess (实; shí) generally refers to any disease that cannot be identified as a deficient pattern, and usually indicates the presence of one of the Six Excesses, or a pattern of stagnation (of qi, xuě, etc.). In a concurrent exterior pattern, excess is characterized by the absence of sweating.

After the fundamental nature of a disease in terms of the Eight Principles is determined, the investigation focuses on more specific aspects. By evaluating the present signs and symptoms against the background of typical disharmony patterns of the various entities, evidence is collected whether or how specific entities are affected. This evaluation can be done

1. in respect of the meridians (经络辩证; jīngluò biàn zhèng)
2. in respect of qi (气血辩证,; qì xuè biàn zhèng)
3. in respect of xuè (气血辩证; qì xuè biàn zhèng)
4. in respect of the body fluids (津液辩证; jīnyè biàn zhèng)
5. in respect of the zàng-fǔ (脏腑辩证; zàngfǔ biàn zhèng) – very similar to this, though less specific, is disharmony pattern description in terms of the Five Elements [五行辩证; wǔ xíng biàn zhèng])

There are also three special pattern diagnosis systems used in case of febrile and infectious diseases only ("Six Channel system" or "six division pattern" [六经辩证; liù jīng biàn zhèng]; "Wei Qi Ying Xue system" or "four division pattern" [卫气营血辩证; weì qì yíng xuè biàn zhèng]; "San Jiao system" or "three burners pattern" [三焦辩证; sānjiaō biàn zhèng]).

==== Considerations of disease causes ====
Although TCM and its concept of disease do not strongly differentiate between cause and effect, pattern discrimination can include considerations regarding the disease cause; this is called 病因辩证 (bìngyīn biàn zhèng, "disease-cause pattern discrimination").

There are three fundamental categories of disease causes (三因; sān yīn) recognized:

1. external causes: these include the Six Excesses and "Pestilential Qi".
2. internal causes: the "Seven Affects" (七情; qī qíng, sometimes also translated as "Seven Emotions") – joy, anger, brooding, sorrow, fear, fright and grief. These are believed to be able to cause damage to the functions of the zàng-fú, especially of the Liver.
3. non-external-non-internal causes: dietary irregularities (especially: too much raw, cold, spicy, fatty or sweet food; voracious eating; too much alcohol), fatigue, sexual intemperance, trauma, and parasites (虫; chóng).

== Diagnostics ==
In TCM, there are five major diagnostic methods: inspection, auscultation, olfaction, inquiry, and palpation. These are grouped into what is known as the "Four pillars" of diagnosis, which are Inspection, Auscultation/ Olfaction, Inquiry, and Palpation (望，聞，問，切).

- Inspection focuses on the face and particularly on the tongue, including analysis of the tongue size, shape, tension, color and coating, and the absence or presence of teeth marks around the edge.
- Auscultation refers to listening for particular sounds (such as wheezing).
- Olfaction refers to attending to body odor.
- Inquiry focuses on the "seven inquiries", which involve asking the person about the regularity, severity, or other characteristics of: chills, fever, perspiration, appetite, thirst, taste, defecation, urination, pain, sleep, menses, leukorrhea.
- Palpation which includes feeling the body for tender A-shi points, and the palpation of the wrist pulses as well as various other pulses, and palpation of the abdomen.

=== Tongue and pulse ===
Examination of the tongue and the pulse are among the principal diagnostic methods in TCM. Details of the tongue, including shape, size, color, texture, cracks, teeth marks, as well as tongue coating are all considered as part of tongue diagnosis. Various regions of the tongue's surface are believed to correspond to the zàng-fŭ organs. For example, redness on the tip of the tongue might indicate heat in the Heart, while redness on the sides of the tongue might indicate heat in the Liver.

Pulse palpation involves measuring the pulse both at a superficial and at a deep level at three different locations on the radial artery (Cun, Guan, Chi, located two fingerbreadths from the wrist crease, one fingerbreadth from the wrist crease, and right at the wrist crease, respectively, usually palpated with the index, middle and ring finger) of each arm, for a total of twelve pulses, all of which are thought to correspond with certain zàng-fŭ. The pulse is examined for several characteristics including rhythm, strength and volume, and described with qualities like "floating, slippery, bolstering-like, feeble, thready and quick"; each of these qualities indicates certain disease patterns. Learning TCM pulse diagnosis can take several years.

== Herbal medicine ==
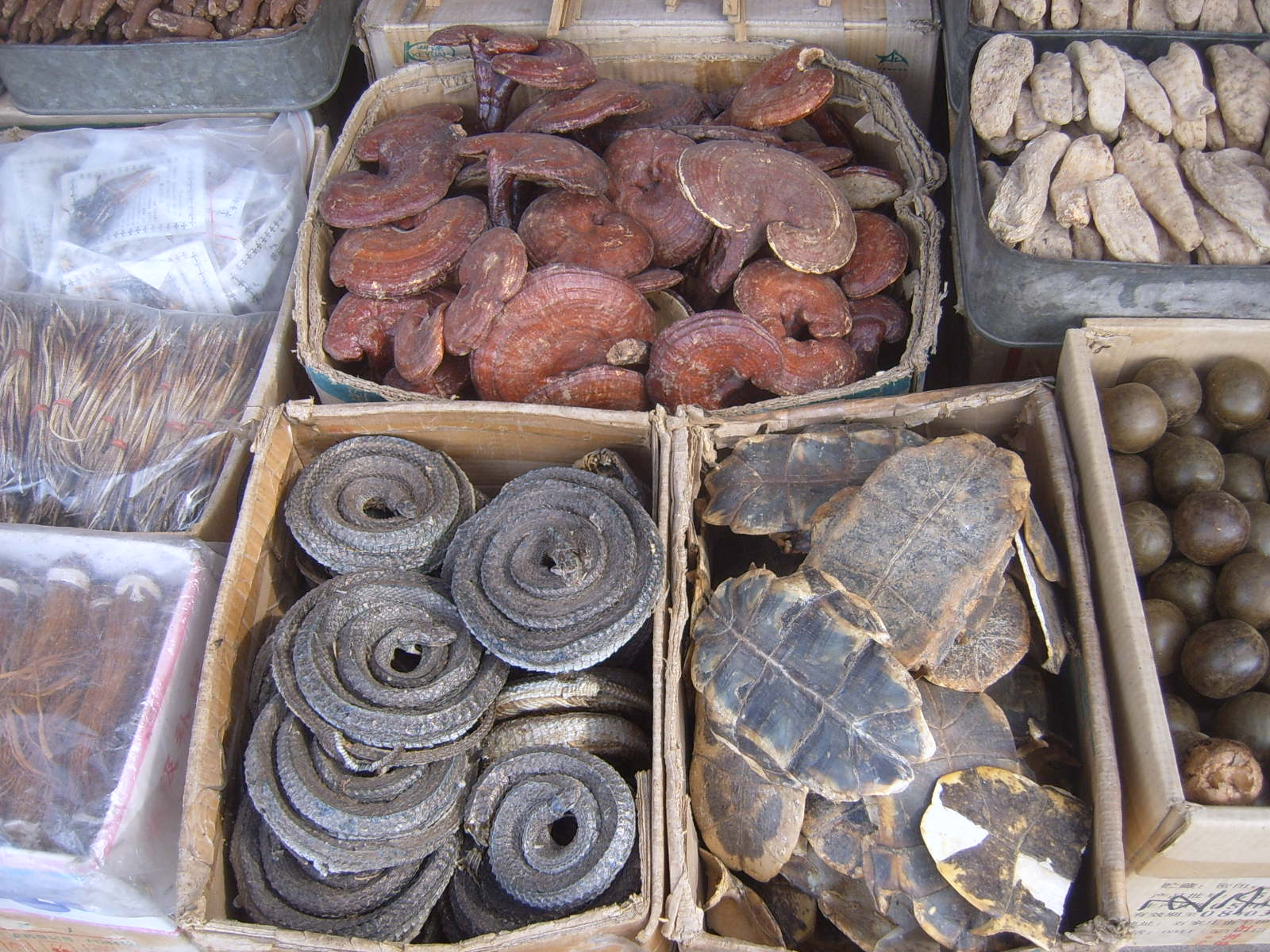
Assorted dried plant and animal parts used in traditional Chinese medicines, clockwise from top left corner: dried Lingzhi (lit. 'spirit mushrooms'), ginseng, Luo Han Guo, turtle shell underbelly (plastron), and dried curled snakes.

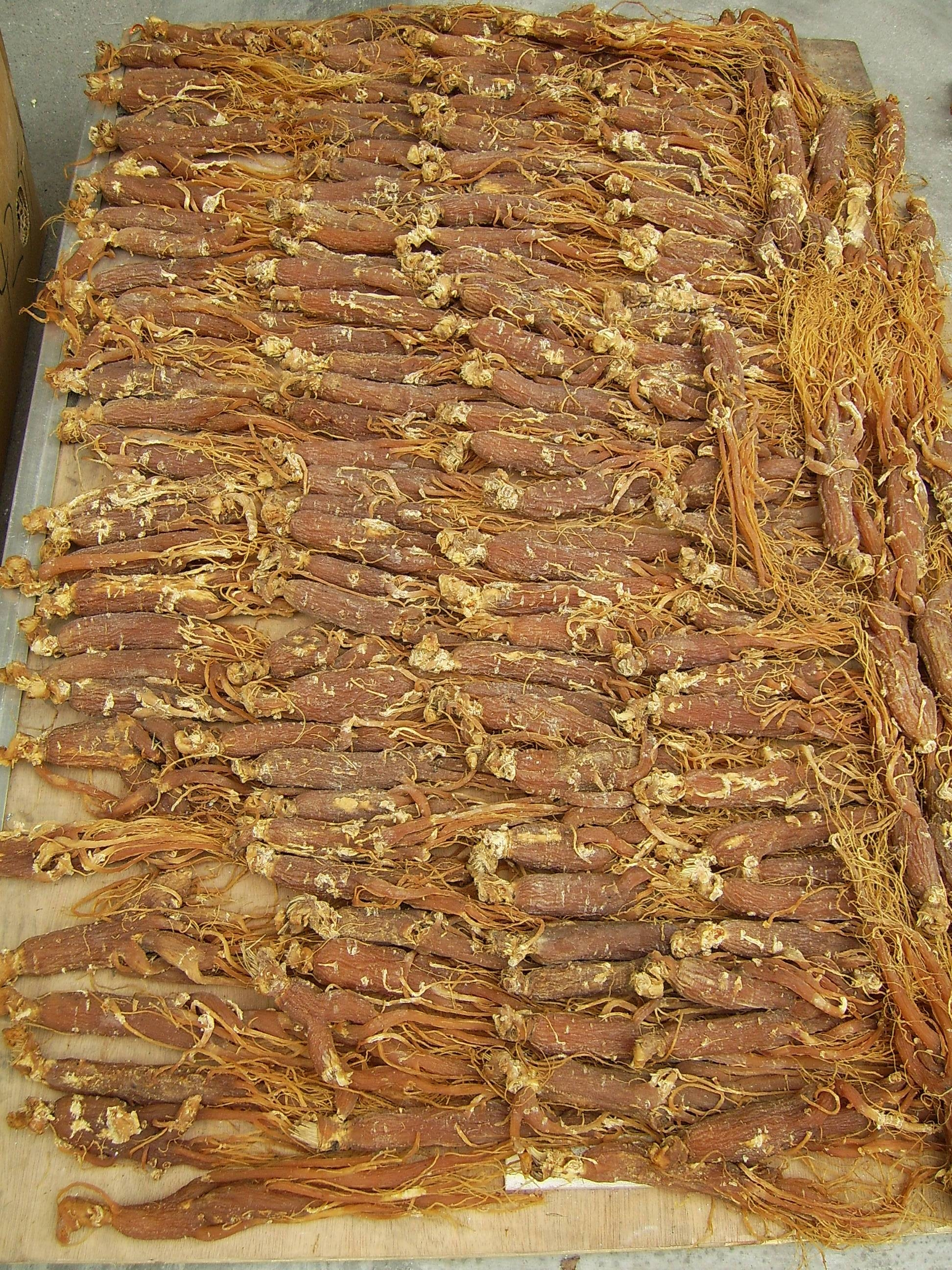
Chinese red ginseng roots

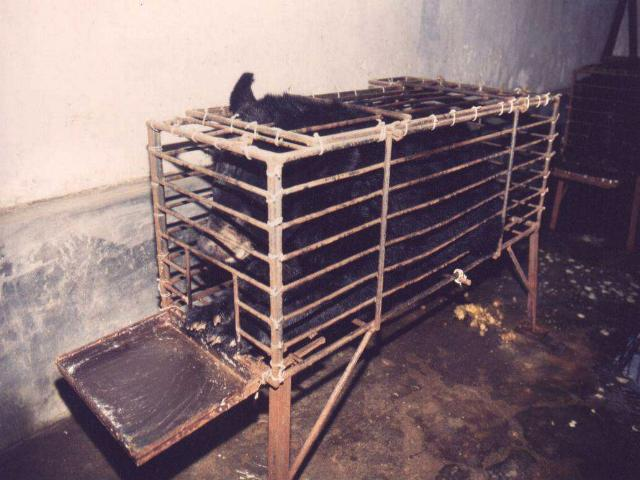
A bile bear in a "crush cage" on Huizhou Farm, China

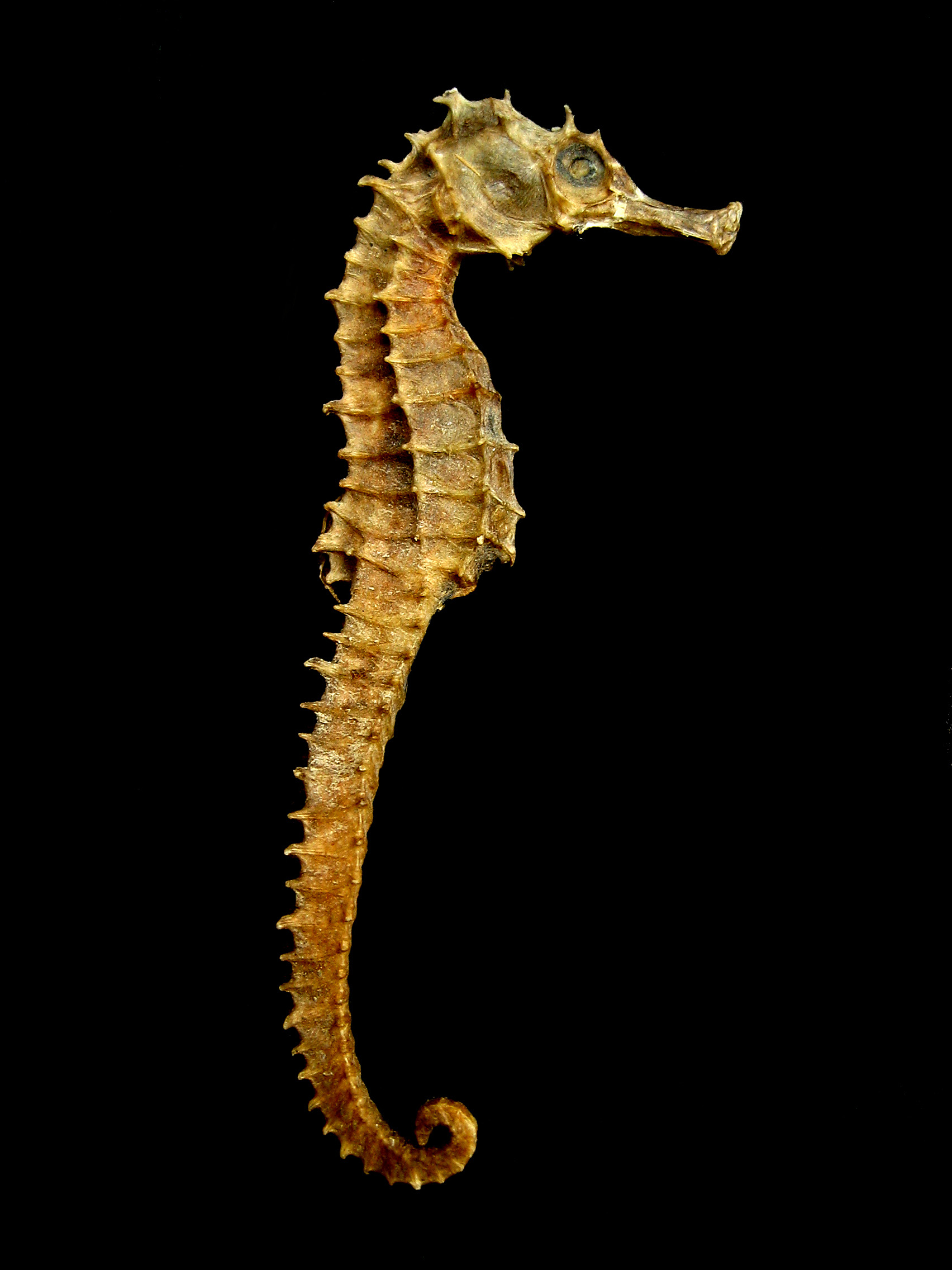
Dried seahorses are extensively used in traditional medicine in China and elsewhere.

The term "herbal medicine" is somewhat misleading in that, while plant elements are by far the most commonly used substances in TCM, other, non-botanic substances are used as well: animal, human, fungi, and mineral products are also used. Thus, the term "medicinal" (instead of herb) may be used. A 2019 review of traditional herbal treatments found they are widely used but lacking in scientific evidence, and urged a more rigorous approach by which genuinely useful medicinals might be identified.

=== Raw materials ===
There are roughly 13,000 compounds used in China and over 100,000 TCM recipes recorded in the ancient literature. Plant elements and extracts are by far the most common elements used. In the classic Handbook of Traditional Drugs from 1941, 517 drugs were listed – out of these, 45 were animal parts, and 30 were minerals.

==== Animal substances ====
Some animal parts used include cow gallstones, hornet nests, leeches, and scorpion. Other examples of animal parts include horn of the antelope or buffalo, deer antlers, testicles and penis bone of the dog, and snake bile. Some TCM textbooks still recommend preparations containing animal tissues, but there has been little research to justify the claimed clinical efficacy of many TCM animal products.

===== Endangered species and other wild animals =====
Some compounds can include the parts of endangered species, including tiger bones and rhinoceros horn which is used for many ailments (though not as an aphrodisiac as is commonly misunderstood in the West). The black market in rhinoceros horns (driven not just by TCM but also unrelated status-seeking) has reduced the world's rhino population by more than 90 percent over the past 40 years. Concerns have also arisen over the use of pangolin scales, turtle plastron, seahorses, and the gill plates of mobula and manta rays.

Poachers hunt restricted or endangered species to supply the black market with TCM products. There is no scientific evidence of efficacy for tiger medicines. Concern over China considering to legalize the trade in tiger parts prompted the 171-nation Convention on International Trade in Endangered Species (CITES) to endorse a decision opposing the resurgence of trade in tigers. Fewer than 30,000 saiga antelopes remain, the horns of which are illegally exported to China by organized gangs to be used in traditional fever therapies. The pressures on seahorses (Hippocampus spp.) used in traditional medicine is enormous; tens of millions of animals are unsustainably caught annually. Many species of syngnathid are currently part of the IUCN Red List of Threatened Species or national equivalents.

The deer penis is believed to have therapeutic benefits according to traditional Chinese medicine. Tiger parts from poached animals include tiger penis, believed to improve virility, and tiger eyes. The illegal trade for tiger parts in China has driven the species to near-extinction because of its popularity in traditional medicine. Laws protecting even critically endangered species such as the Sumatran tiger fail to stop the display and sale of these items in open markets.

Shark fin soup is traditionally regarded in Chinese medicine as beneficial for health in East Asia, and its status as an elite dish has led to huge demand with the increase of affluence in China, devastating shark populations. The shark fins have been a part of traditional Chinese medicine for centuries. Shark finning is banned in many countries, but the trade is thriving in Hong Kong and China, where the fins are part of shark fin soup, a dish considered a delicacy, and used in some types of traditional Chinese medicine.

Restrictions are made on the accumulation and export of endangered species not raised in captivity. Australian scientists have developed methods to identify medicines containing DNA traces of endangered species. Finally, although not an endangered species, sharp rises in exports of donkeys and donkey hide from Africa to China to make the traditional remedy ejiao have prompted export restrictions by some African countries.

===== Animals raised in captivity =====
Since TCM recognizes bear bile as a treatment compound, more than 12,000 asiatic black bears are held in bear farms. The bile is extracted through a permanent hole in the abdomen leading to the gall bladder, which can cause severe pain. This can lead to bears trying to kill themselves. As of 2012, approximately 10,000 bears are farmed in China for their bile. This practice has spurred public outcry across the country. The bile is collected from live bears via a surgical procedure. As of March 2020 bear bile as ingredient of Tan Re Qing injection remains on the list of remedies recommended for treatment of "severe cases" of COVID-19 by National Health Commission of China and the National Administration of Traditional Chinese Medicine.

The tortoise (freshwater turtle, guiban) and turtle (Chinese softshell turtle, biejia) species used in traditional Chinese medicine are raised on farms, However, issues concerning the overexploitation of wild Asian turtles in China have not been completely solved.

===== Replacement =====
Some ingredients originating from endangered or otherwise rare species have widely (but not universally) recognized alternatives. For example, rhinoceros horn is generally replaced with a buffalo horn "concentrate powder", a practice adopted by the Chinese Pharmacopoeia. Tiger bone has been replaced with a mixture of bone powders from three livestock species in a Chinese patent medicine approved as a prescription drug in China. More

==== Human body parts ====
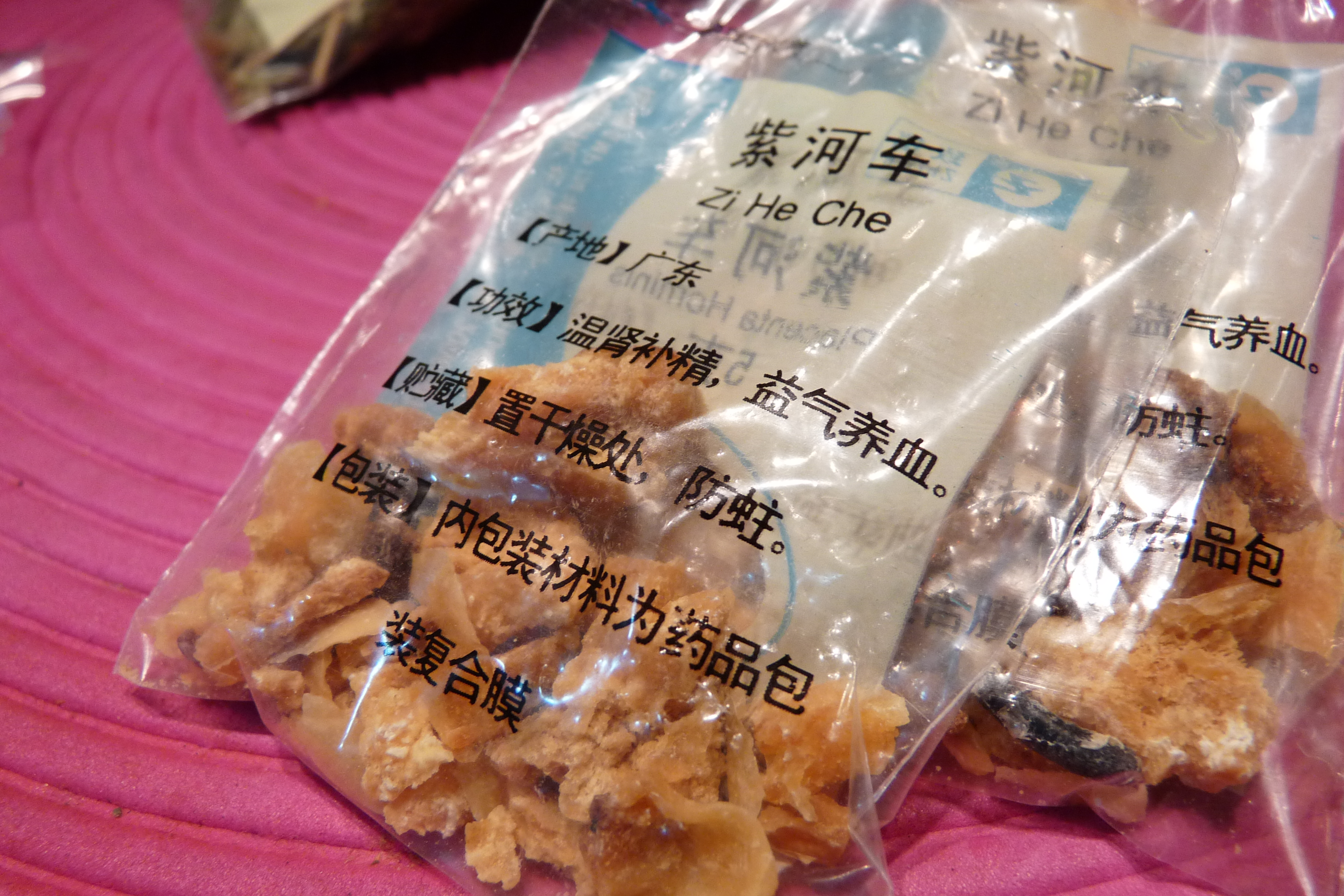
Dried human placenta (Ziheche (紫河车) is used in traditional Chinese medicine.

Traditional Chinese medicine also includes some human parts: the classic Materia medica (Bencao Gangmu) describes (also criticizes) the use of 35 human body parts and excreta in medicines, including bones, fingernail, hairs, dandruff, earwax, impurities on the teeth, feces, urine, sweat, organs, but most are no longer in use.

Human placenta has been used an ingredient in certain traditional Chinese medicines, including using dried human placenta, known as "Ziheche", to treat infertility, impotence and other conditions. The consumption of the human placenta is a potential source of infection.

=== Traditional categorization ===
The traditional categorizations and classifications that can still be found today are:

- The classification according to the Four Natures (四气; sì qì): hot, warm, cool, or cold (or, neutral in terms of temperature) and hot and warm herbs are used to treat cold diseases, while cool and cold herbs are used to treat heat diseases.
- The classification according to the Five Flavors, (五味; wǔ wèi, sometimes also translated as Five Tastes): acrid, sweet, bitter, sour, and salty. Substances may also have more than one flavor, or none (i.e., a "bland" flavor). Each of the Five Flavors corresponds to one of zàng organs, which in turn corresponds to one of the Five Phases. A flavor implies certain properties and therapeutic actions of a substance; e.g., saltiness drains downward and softens hard masses, while sweetness is supplementing, harmonizing, and moistening.
- The classification according to the meridian – more precisely, the zàng-fu organ including its associated meridian – which can be expected to be primarily affected by a given compound.
- The categorization according to the specific function mainly include: exterior-releasing or exterior-resolving, heat-clearing, downward-draining, or precipitating wind-damp-dispelling, dampness-transforming, promoting the movement of water and percolating dampness or dampness-percolating, interior-warming, qi-regulating or qi-rectifying, dispersing food accumulation or food-dispersing, worm-expelling, stopping bleeding or blood-stanching, quickening the Blood and dispelling stasis or blood-quickening, transforming phlegm, stopping coughing and calming wheezing or phlegm-transforming and cough- and panting-suppressing, Spirit-quieting, calming the liver and expelling wind or liver-calming and wind-extinguishing orifice-opening supplementing which includes qi-supplementing, blood-nourishing, yin-enriching, and yang-fortifying, astriction-promoting or securing and astringing, vomiting-inducing, and substances for external application.

=== Efficacy ===
As of 2007 there were not enough good-quality trials of herbal therapies to allow their effectiveness to be determined. A high percentage of relevant studies on traditional Chinese medicine are in Chinese databases. Fifty percent of systematic reviews on TCM did not search Chinese databases, which could lead to a bias in the results. Many systematic reviews of TCM interventions published in Chinese journals are incomplete, some contained errors or were misleading. The herbs recommended by traditional Chinese practitioners in the US are unregulated.

- A 2013 review found the data too weak to support use of Chinese herbal medicine (CHM) for benign prostatic hyperplasia.
- A 2013 review found the research on the benefit and safety of CHM for idiopathic sudden sensorineural hearing loss is of poor quality and cannot be relied upon to support their use.
- A 2013 Cochrane review found inconclusive evidence that CHM reduces the severity of eczema.
- The traditional medicine ginger, which has shown anti-inflammatory properties in laboratory experiments, has been used to treat rheumatism, headache and digestive and respiratory issues, though there is no firm evidence supporting these uses.
- A 2012 Cochrane review found no difference in mortality rate among 640 SARS patients when Chinese herbs were used alongside Western medicine versus Western medicine exclusively, although they concluded some herbs may have improved symptoms and decreased corticosteroid doses.
- A 2012 Cochrane review found insufficient evidence to support the use of TCM for people with adhesive small bowel obstruction.
- A 2011 review found low quality evidence that suggests CHM improves the symptoms of Sjögren's syndrome.
- A 2011 Cochrane review found inconclusive evidence to support the use of TCM herbal medicines for treatment of hypercholesterolemia.
- A 2011 Cochrane review did not find improvement in fasting C-peptide when compared to insulin treatment for latent autoimmune diabetes in adults after 3 months. It is important to highlight that the studies available to be included in this review presented considerable flaws in quality and design.
- A 2010 review found TCM seems to be effective for the treatment of fibromyalgia but the findings were of insufficient methodological rigor.
- A 2008 Cochrane review found promising evidence for the use of Chinese herbal medicine in relieving painful menstruation, but the trials assessed were of such low methodological quality that no conclusion could be drawn about the remedies' suitability as a recommendable treatment option.
- Turmeric has been used in traditional Chinese medicine for centuries to treat various conditions. This includes jaundice and hepatic disorders, rheumatism, anorexia, diabetic wounds, and menstrual complications. Most of its effects have been attributed to curcumin. However, despite many clinical studies conducted, curcumin has shown no scientifically substantiated medical uses.
- A 2005 Cochrane review found insufficient evidence for the use of CHM in HIV-infected people and people with AIDS.
- A 2010 Cochrane review found insufficient evidence to support the use of Traditional Chinese Herbal Products (THCP) in the treatment of angina.
- A 2010 Cochrane review found no evidence supporting the use of TCHM for stopping bleeding from haemorrhoids. There was some weak evidence of pain relief.

==== Drug research ====
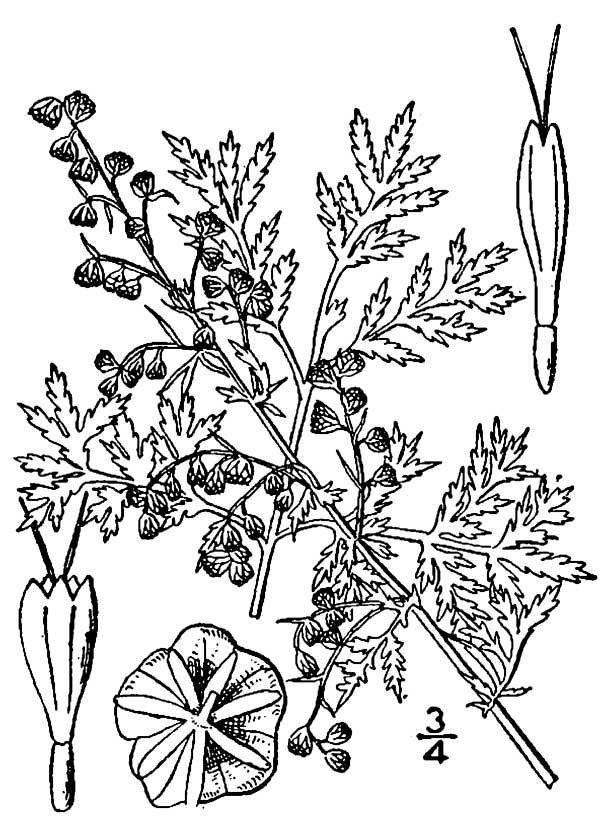
Artemisia annua, traditionally used to treat fever, has been found to have antimalarial properties.

With an eye to the enormous Chinese market, pharmaceutical companies have explored creating new drugs from traditional remedies. The journal Nature commented that "claims made on behalf of an uncharted body of knowledge should be treated with the customary scepticism that is the bedrock of both science and medicine."

There was success in the 1970s, however, with the development of the antimalarial drug artemisinin, which is a chemical compound isolated the herb Artemisia annua that has been used traditionally as a treatment for fever. Artemisia annua has been used by Chinese herbalists in traditional Chinese medicines for 2,000 years. In 1596, Li Shizhen recommended tea made from qinghao specifically to treat malaria symptoms in his Compendium of Materia Medica. Researcher Tu Youyou discovered that a low-temperature extraction process could isolate an effective antimalarial substance from the plant. Tu says she was influenced by a traditional Chinese herbal medicine source, The Handbook of Prescriptions for Emergency Treatments, written in 340 by Ge Hong, which states that this herb should be steeped in cold water. The extracted substance, once subject to detoxification and purification processes, is a usable antimalarial drug – a 2012 review found that artemisinin-based remedies were the most effective drugs for the treatment of malaria. For her work on malaria, Tu received the 2015 Nobel Prize in Physiology or Medicine. Despite global efforts in combating malaria, it remains a large burden for the population. Although WHO recommends artemisinin-based remedies for treating uncomplicated malaria, resistance to the drug can no longer be ignored.

Also in the 1970s Chinese researcher Zhang TingDong and colleagues investigated the potential use of the traditionally used substance arsenic trioxide to treat acute promyelocytic leukemia (APL). Building on his work, research both in China and the West eventually led to the development of the drug Trisenox, which was approved for leukemia treatment by the FDA in 2000.

Huperzine A, an extract from the herb, Huperzia serrata, is under preliminary research as a possible therapeutic for Alzheimer's disease, but poor methodological quality of the research restricts conclusions about its effectiveness.

Ephedrine in its natural form, known as má huáng (麻黄) in TCM, has been documented in China since the Han dynasty (206 BCE – 220 CE) as an antiasthmatic and stimulant. In 1885, the chemical synthesis of ephedrine was first accomplished by Japanese organic chemist Nagai Nagayoshi based on his research on Japanese and Chinese traditional herbal medicines

Pien tze huang was first documented in the Ming dynasty.

==== Cost-effectiveness ====
A 2012 systematic review found there is a lack of available cost-effectiveness evidence in TCM.

=== Safety ===
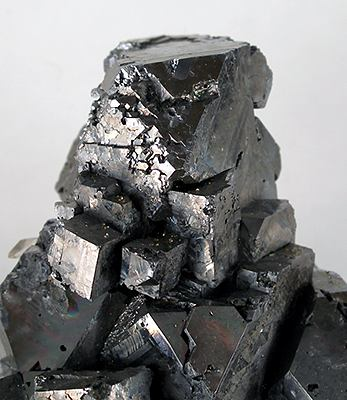
Galena (lead ore) is part of historical TCM. Standard American TCM practice considers lead-containing herbs obsolete.

From the earliest records regarding the use of compounds to today, the toxicity of certain substances has been described in all Chinese materiae medicae. Since TCM has become more popular in the Western world, there are increasing concerns about the potential toxicity of many traditional Chinese plants, animal parts and minerals. Traditional Chinese herbal remedies are conveniently available from grocery stores in most Chinese neighborhoods; some of these items may contain toxic ingredients, are imported into the U.S. illegally, and are associated with claims of therapeutic benefit without evidence. For most compounds, efficacy and toxicity testing are based on traditional knowledge rather than laboratory analysis. The toxicity in some cases could be confirmed by modern research (i.e., in scorpion); in some cases it could not (i.e., in Curculigo). Traditional herbal medicines can contain extremely toxic chemicals and heavy metals, and naturally occurring toxins, which can cause illness, exacerbate pre-existing poor health or result in death. Botanical misidentification of plants can cause toxic reactions in humans. The description of some plants used in TCM has changed, leading to unintended poisoning by using the wrong plants. A concern is also contaminated herbal medicines with microorganisms and fungal toxins, including aflatoxin. Traditional herbal medicines are sometimes contaminated with toxic heavy metals, including lead, arsenic, mercury and cadmium, which inflict serious health risks to consumers. Also, adulteration of some herbal medicine preparations with conventional drugs which may cause serious adverse effects, such as corticosteroids, phenylbutazone, phenytoin, and glibenclamide, has been reported.

Substances known to be potentially dangerous include Aconitum, secretions from the Asiatic toad, powdered centipede, the Chinese beetle (Mylabris phalerata), certain fungi, Aristolochia (which is known to cause cancer). arsenic sulfide (realgar), mercury sulfide, and cinnabar. Asbestos ore (Actinolite, Yang Qi Shi, 阳起石) is used to treat impotence in TCM. Due to galena's (litharge, lead(II) oxide) high lead content, it is known to be toxic. Lead, mercury, arsenic, copper, cadmium, and thallium have been detected in TCM products sold in the U.S. and China.

To avoid its toxic adverse effects Xanthium sibiricum must be processed. Hepatotoxicity has been reported with products containing Reynoutria multiflora (synonym Polygonum multiflorum), glycyrrhizin, Senecio and Symphytum. The herbs indicated as being hepatotoxic included Dictamnus dasycarpus, Astragalus membranaceus, and Paeonia lactiflora. Contrary to popular belief, Ganoderma lucidum mushroom extract, as an adjuvant for cancer immunotherapy, appears to have the potential for toxicity. A 2013 review suggested that although the antimalarial herb Artemisia annua may not cause hepatotoxicity, haematotoxicity, or hyperlipidemia, it should be used cautiously during pregnancy due to a potential risk of embryotoxicity at a high dose.

However, many adverse reactions are due to misuse or abuse of Chinese medicine. For example, the misuse of the dietary supplement Ephedra (containing ephedrine) can lead to adverse events including gastrointestinal problems as well as sudden death from cardiomyopathy. Products adulterated with pharmaceuticals for weight loss or erectile dysfunction are one of the main concerns. Chinese herbal medicine has been a major cause of acute liver failure in China.

The harvesting of guano from bat caves (yemingsha) brings workers into close contact with these animals, increasing the risk of zoonosis. The Chinese virologist Shi Zhengli has identified dozens of SARS-like coronaviruses in samples of bat droppings.

== Acupuncture and moxibustion ==
Acupuncture and moxibustion of traditional Chinese medicine
- UNESCO Intangible Cultural Heritage
- Country: China
- Reference: 425
- Region: Asia and the Pacific

Inscription history
- Inscription: 2010
- UNESCO Cultural Heritage

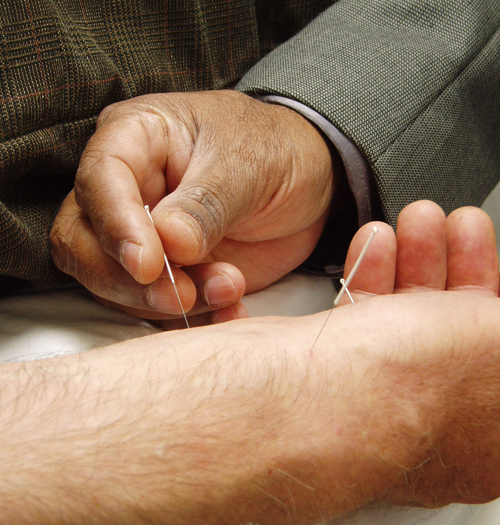
Needles being inserted into the skin

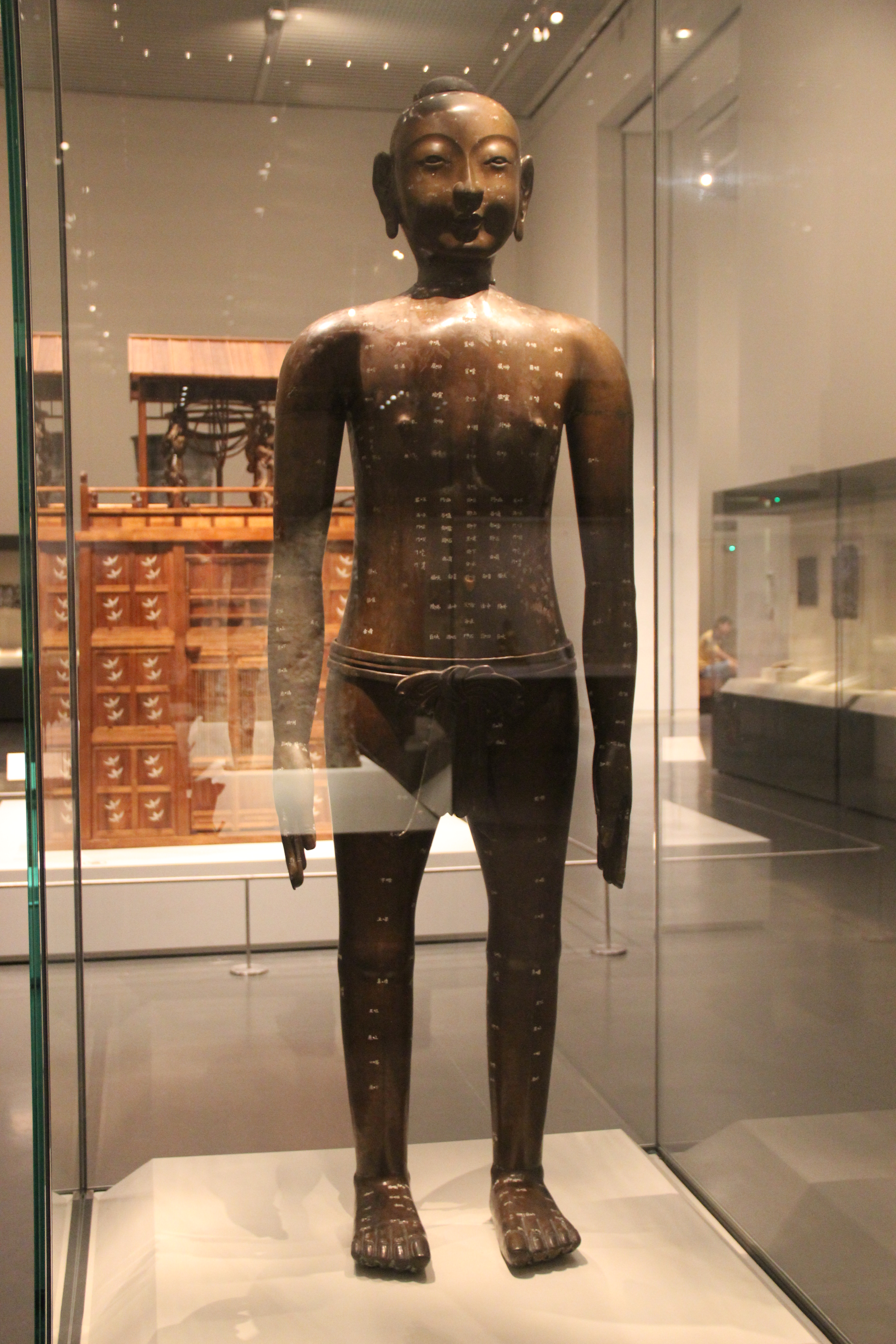
A bronze acupuncture statue from the Ming dynasty being displayed inside a museum

Acupuncture is the insertion of needles into superficial structures of the body (skin, subcutaneous tissue, muscles) – usually at acupuncture points (acupoints) – and their subsequent manipulation; this aims at influencing the flow of qi. According to TCM it relieves pain and treats (and prevents) various diseases. The US FDA classifies single-use acupuncture needles as Class II medical devices, under CFR 21.

Acupuncture is often accompanied by moxibustion – the Chinese characters for acupuncture (针灸; 針灸; zhēnjiǔ) literally meaning "acupuncture-moxibustion" – which involves burning mugwort on or near the skin at an acupuncture point. According to the American Cancer Society, "available scientific evidence does not support claims that moxibustion is effective in preventing or treating cancer or any other disease".

In electroacupuncture, an electric current is applied to the needles once they are inserted, to further stimulate the respective acupuncture points.

A recent historian of Chinese medicine remarked that it is "nicely ironic that the specialty of acupuncture – arguably the most questionable part of their medical heritage for most Chinese at the start of the twentieth century – has become the most marketable aspect of Chinese medicine." She found that acupuncture as we know it today has hardly been in existence for sixty years. Moreover, the fine, filiform needle we think of as the acupuncture needle today was not widely used a century ago. Present day acupuncture was developed in the 1930s and put into wide practice only as late as the 1960s.

=== Efficacy ===
A 2013 editorial in the American journal Anesthesia and Analgesia stated that acupuncture studies produced inconsistent results, (i.e. acupuncture relieved pain in some conditions but had no effect in other very similar conditions) which suggests the presence of false positive results. These may be caused by factors like biased study design, poor blinding, and the classification of electrified needles (a type of TENS) as a form of acupuncture. The inability to find consistent results despite more than 3,000 studies, the editorial continued, suggests that the treatment seems to be a placebo effect and the existing equivocal positive results are the type of noise one expects to see after a large number of studies are performed on an inert therapy. The editorial concluded that the best controlled studies showed a clear pattern, in which the outcome does not rely upon needle location or even needle insertion, and since "these variables are those that define acupuncture, the only sensible conclusion is that acupuncture does not work."

A 2012 meta-analysis of 17,922 patients found modest increases in chronic pain relief from real acupuncture compared with sham acupuncture controls, suggesting an effect greater than a placebo. The meta-analysis also noted that the mechanisms of acupuncture "are clinically relevant, but that an important part of these total effects is not due to issues considered to be crucial by most acupuncturists, such as the correct location of points and depth of needling" and that acupuncture may be "associated with more potent placebo or context effects" than other treatments. Commenting on these findings, both Edzard Ernst and David Colquhoun said the results were of negligible clinical significance.

A 2011 overview of Cochrane reviews found evidence that suggests acupuncture is effective for some but not all kinds of pain. A 2010 systematic review found that there is evidence "that acupuncture provides a short-term clinically relevant effect when compared with a waiting list control or when acupuncture is added to another intervention" in the treatment of chronic low back pain. Two review articles discussing the effectiveness of acupuncture, from 2008 and 2009, have concluded that there is not enough evidence to conclude that it is effective beyond the placebo effect.

Acupuncture is generally safe when administered using Clean Needle Technique (CNT). Although serious adverse effects are rare, acupuncture is not without risk. Severe adverse effects, including very rarely death (five case reports), have been reported.

== Tui na ==
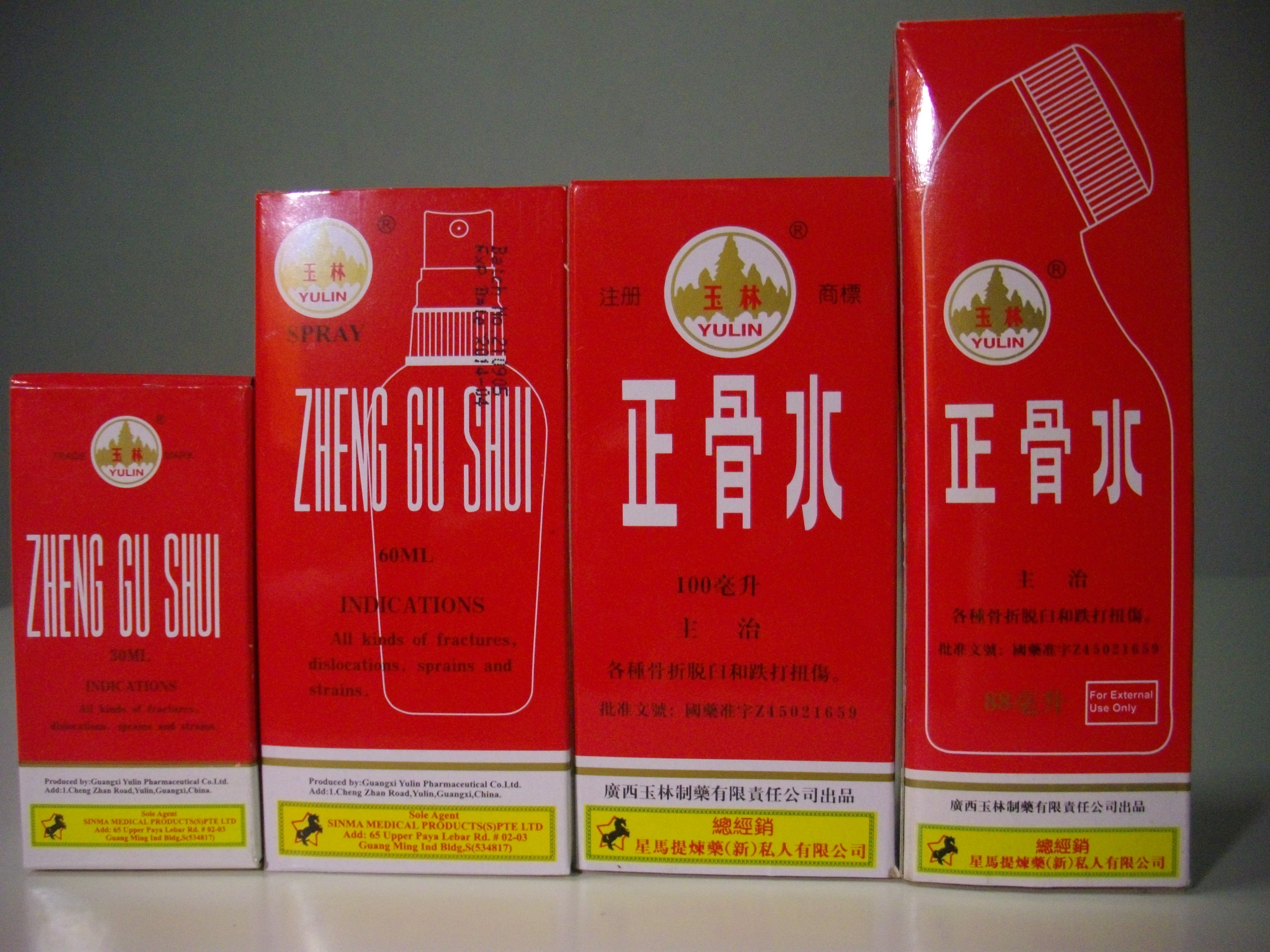
An example of a traditional Chinese medicine used in tui na

Tui na (推拿) is a form of massage, based on the assumptions of TCM, from which shiatsu is thought to have evolved. Techniques employed may include thumb presses, rubbing, percussion, and assisted stretching.

== Qigong ==
Qìgōng (气功; 氣功) is a TCM system of exercise and meditation that combines regulated breathing, slow movement, and focused awareness, purportedly to cultivate and balance qi. One branch of qigong is Qigong massage, in which the practitioner combines massage techniques with awareness of the acupuncture channels and points.

Qi is air, breath, energy, or primordial life source that is neither matter or spirit. While Gong is a skillful movement, work, or exercise of the qi.

=== Forms ===
- Neigong: introspective and meditative
- Waigong: external energy and motion
- Donggong: dynamic or active
- Jinggong: tranquil or passive

== Other therapies ==
=== Cupping ===
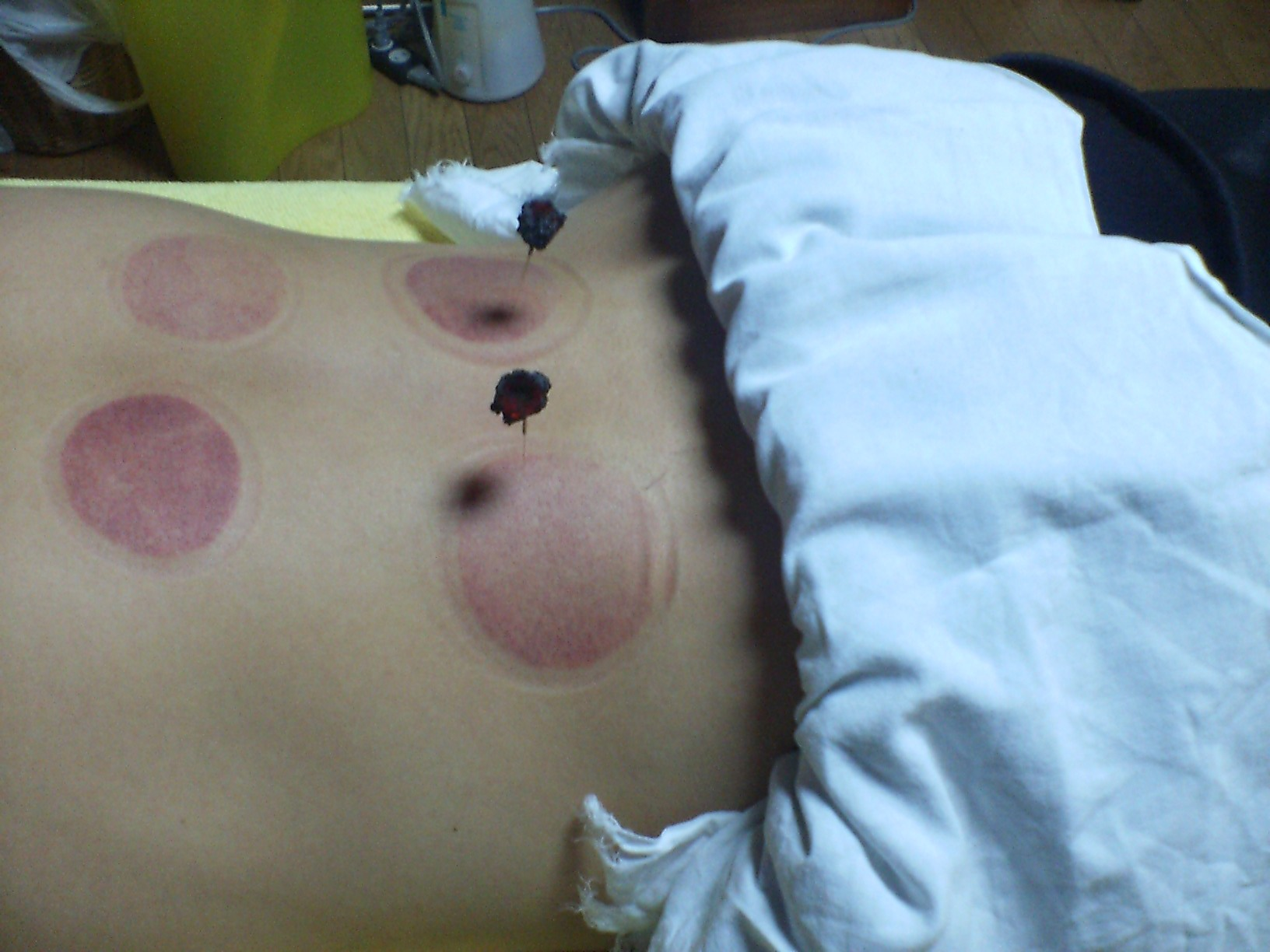
Acupuncture and moxibustion after cupping in Japan

Cupping (拔罐; báguàn) is a type of Chinese massage, consisting of placing several glass "cups" (open spheres) on the body. A match is lit and placed inside the cup and then removed before placing the cup against the skin. As the air in the cup is heated, it expands, and after placing in the skin, cools, creating lower pressure inside the cup that allows the cup to stick to the skin via suction. When combined with massage oil, the cups can be slid around the back, offering "reverse-pressure massage".

=== Gua sha ===
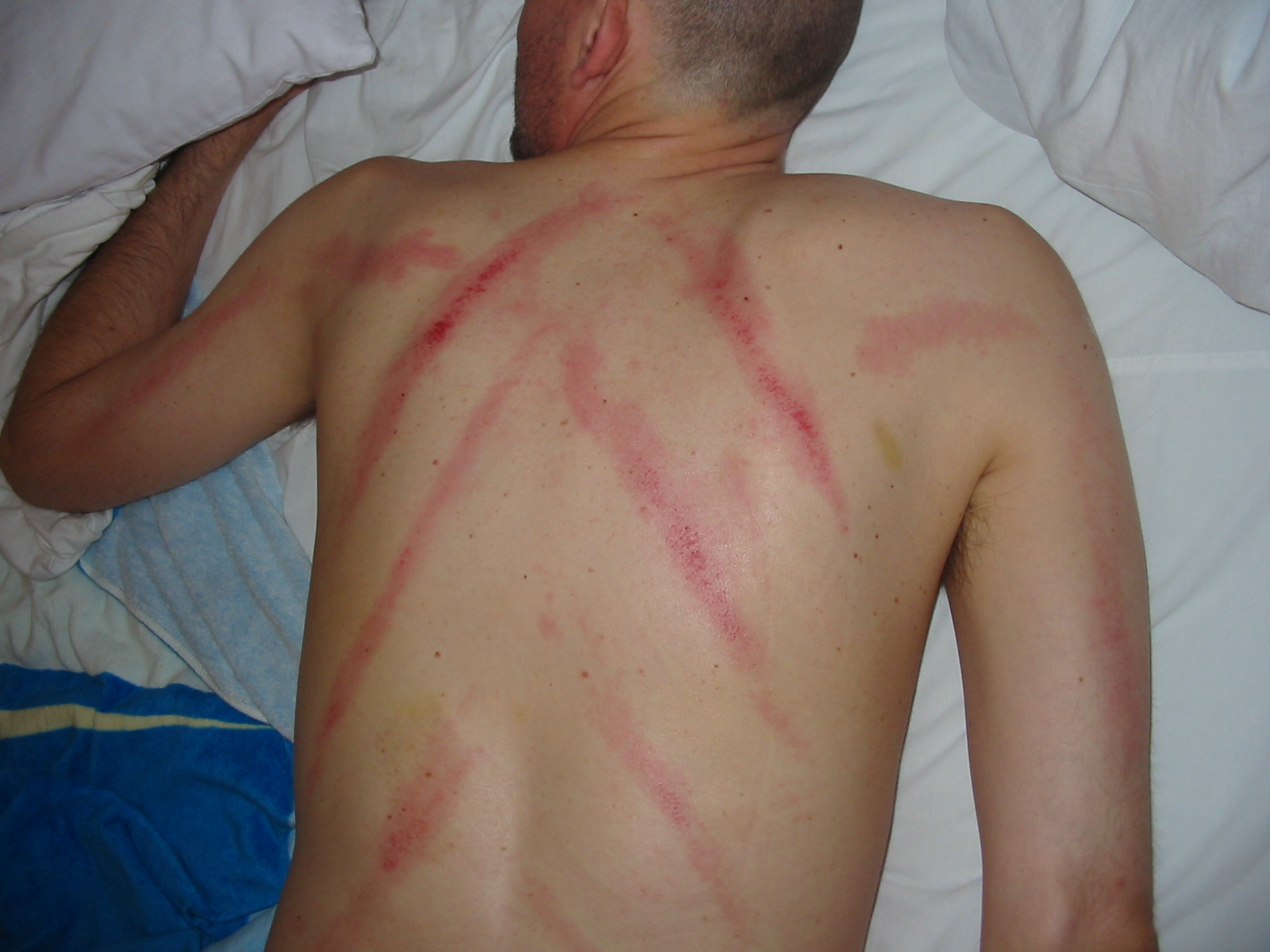
Gua sha

Gua sha (刮痧; guāshā) is abrading the skin with pieces of smooth jade, bone, animal tusks or horns or smooth stones; until red spots then bruising cover the area to which it is done. It is believed that this treatment is for almost any ailment. The red spots and bruising take three to ten days to heal, there is often some soreness in the area that has been treated.

=== Die-da ===
Diē-dǎ (跌打) or Dit Da, is a traditional Chinese bone-setting technique, usually practiced by martial artists who know aspects of Chinese medicine that apply to the treatment of trauma and injuries such as bone fractures, sprains, and bruises. Some of these specialists may also use or recommend other disciplines of Chinese medical therapies if serious injury is involved. Such practice of bone-setting (正骨; 整骨) is not common in the West.

=== Chinese food therapy ===
The concepts yin and yang are associated with different classes of foods, and tradition considers it important to consume them in a balanced fashion. However, there is no scientific evidence supporting such claims, nor their implied notions.

=== Shanghai pedicure ===
Shanghai pedicures are distinct from Western pedicures in their use of scalpels rather than files or pumices. The treatment involves soaking feet in hot water, followed by the careful removal of dead skin, calluses, corns, and ingrown nails. Unlike other pedicures that may prioritize aesthetic appeal, the Shanghai pedicure focuses on health, comfort, and precision. Pedicurists use a set of specially sharpened scalpels to target each area with care, ensuring minimal discomfort.

In this process, the pedicurist examines the client's lifestyle and habits, which they believe can contribute to foot conditions. For example, factors like walking barefoot on carpets or wearing certain types of shoes are seen as potential causes of calluses and rough skin.

== Regulations ==
Many governments have enacted laws to regulate TCM practice.

=== Australia ===
From 1 July 2012 Chinese medicine practitioners must be registered under the national registration and accreditation scheme with the Chinese Medicine Board of Australia and meet the Board's Registration Standards, to practice in Australia.

=== Canada ===
TCM is regulated in five provinces in Canada: Alberta, British Columbia, Ontario, Quebec, and Newfoundland & Labrador.

=== China (mainland) ===
The National Administration of Traditional Chinese Medicine was created in 1949, which then absorbed existing TCM management in 1986 with major changes in 1998.

China's National People's Congress Standing Committee passed the country's first law on TCM in 2016, which came into effect on 1 July 2017. The new law standardized TCM certifications by requiring TCM practitioners to (i) pass exams administered by provincial-level TCM authorities, and (ii) obtain recommendations from two certified practitioners. TCM products and services can be advertised only with approval from the local TCM authority.

Ready-to-use TCM preparations, also known as Chinese patent medicines, are regulated by the National Medical Products Administration (and its predecessor CFDA) similar to preparations used in modern medicine since 1984. The barrier for entry, however, is much lower than medications based on modern/non-TCM principles; the rules allow for omitting clinical testing in a variety of circumstances. As of 2025, the latest (2020) rules allow a simplified procedure for preparations derived from an approved list of "classic prescriptions".

The government-run healthcare system covers a number of TCM procedures and preparations. In 2021, a total of 7114.5 billion yuan went into healthcare, amounting for 6.59% of the year's national GDP. Of these, 1111.5 billion yuan went into covering costs associated with TCM preparations (0.97% of national GDP), with 592.4 billion yuan covering the actual medications.

=== Hong Kong ===
During British rule, Chinese medicine practitioners in Hong Kong were not recognized as "medical doctors", which meant they could not issue prescription drugs, give injections, and such. However, TCM practitioners could register and operate TCM as "herbalists".

The Chinese Medicine Council of Hong Kong, established in 1999, regulates compounds and professional standards for TCM practitioners. All TCM practitioners in Hong Kong are required to register with the council. The eligibility for registration includes a recognised 5-year university degree of TCM, a 30-week minimum supervised clinical internship, and passing the licensing exam.

The approved Chinese medicine institutions are Hong Kong University, Chinese University of Hong Kong and Hong Kong Baptist University.

=== Macau ===
The Portuguese Macau government seldom interfered in the affairs of Chinese society, including with regard to regulations on the practice of TCM. There were a few TCM pharmacies in Macau during the colonial period. In 1994, the Portuguese Macau government published Decree-Law no. 53/94/M that officially started to regulate the TCM market. After the sovereign handover, the Macau S.A.R. government also published regulations on the practice of TCM. In 2000, Macau University of Science and Technology and Nanjing University of Traditional Chinese Medicine established the Macau College of Traditional Chinese Medicine to offer a degree course in Chinese medicine.

In 2022, a new law regulating TCM, Law no. 11/2021, came into effect. The same law also repealed Decree-Law no. 53/94/M.

=== Indonesia ===
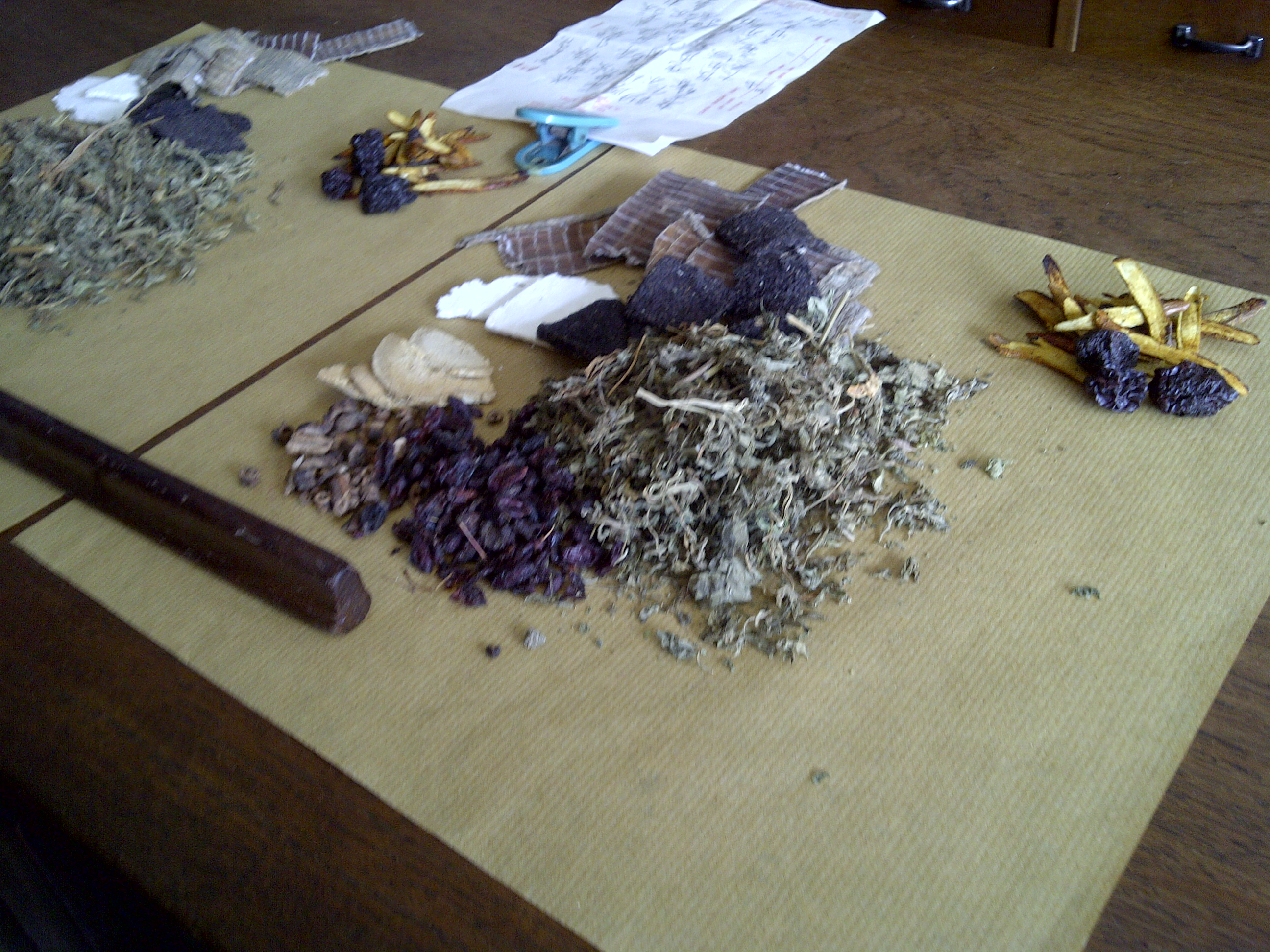
Chinese traditional medicine shop at Surabaya, Indonesia

All traditional medicines, including TCM, are regulated by Indonesian Minister of Health Regulation of 2013 on traditional medicine. Traditional medicine license (Surat Izin Pengobatan Tradisional – SIPT) is granted to the practitioners whose methods are recognized as safe and may benefit health. The TCM clinics are registered but there is no explicit regulation for it. The only TCM method which is accepted by medical logic and is empirically proofed is acupuncture. The acupuncturists can get SIPT and participate in health care facilities.

=== Japan ===
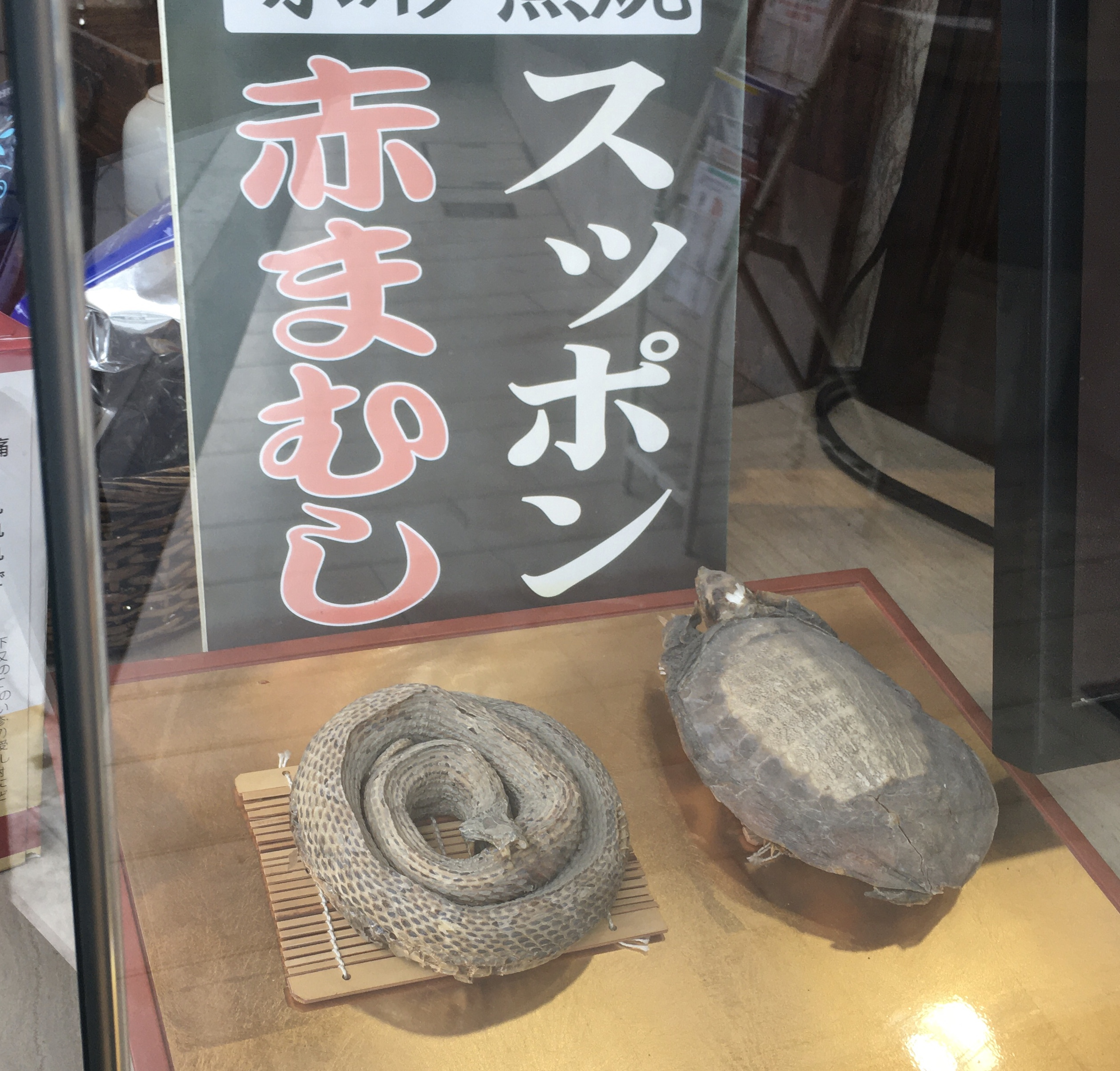
Kampo in Asakusa Tokyo

Kampo or Kanpō medicine (漢方医学, Kanpō igaku), often known simply as Kanpō (漢方; Japanese medicine) literally means "method from the Han period of Chinese history, but took on specific Japanese characteristics during the Edo period of Japanese history after 1600. One authority writes that Kampo medicine is not the same as modern traditional Chinese medicine (TCM). Japanese Kampo favors diagnostic methods that directly relate the symptoms to the therapy, rather than speculative concepts of traditional philosophy, such as Yin and Yang and the theory of the five elements.

Under modern Japanese medical law, it is possible for doctors to perform acupuncture and massage, but because there is a separate law regarding acupuncture and massage, these treatments are mainly performed by massage therapists, acupuncturists, and moxibustion practitioners.

=== Korea ===
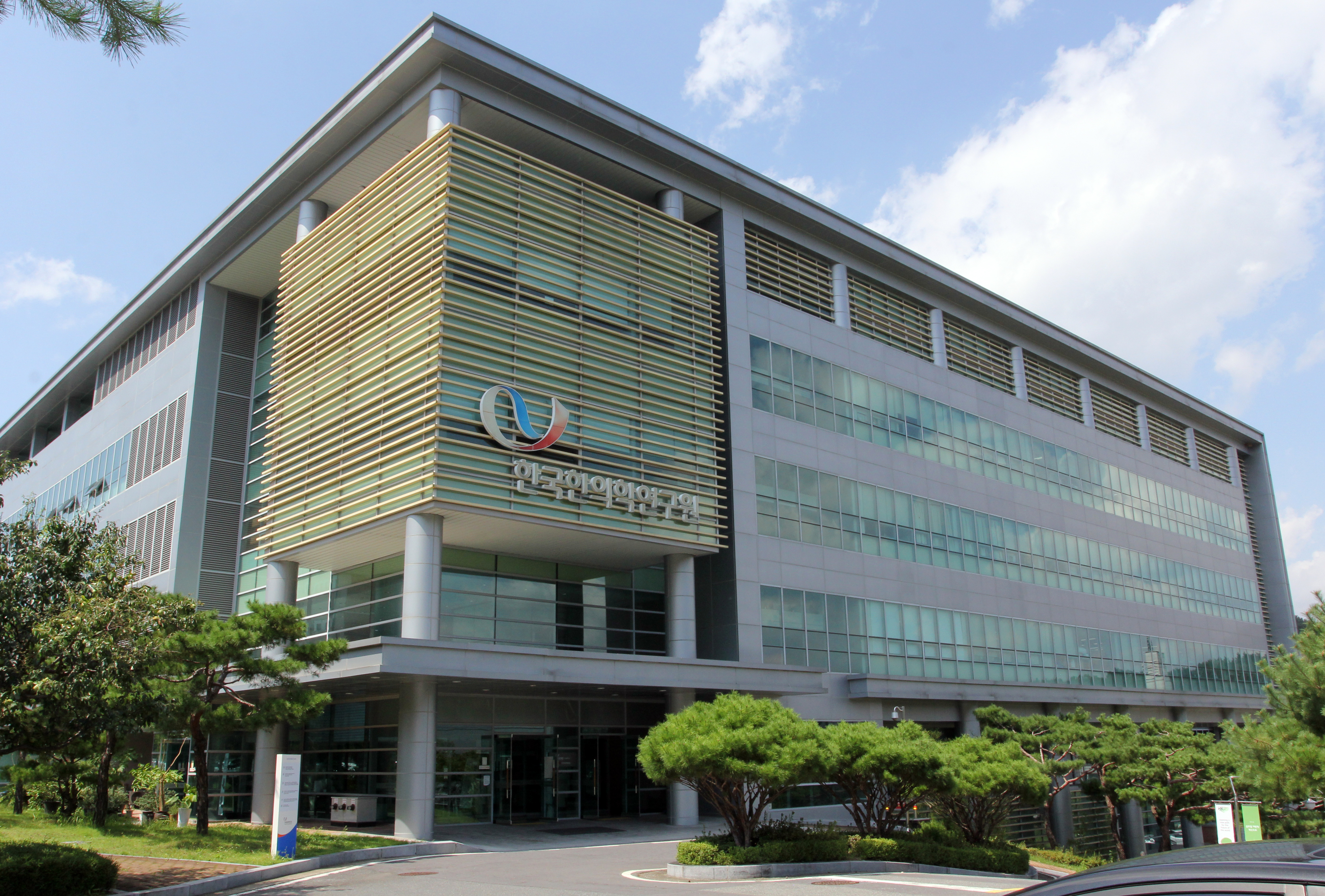
Korea Institute of Oriental Medicine

Under the Medical Service Act (의료법/醫療法), an oriental medical doctor, whose obligation is to administer oriental medical treatment and provide guidance for health based on oriental medicine, shall be treated in the same manner as a medical doctor or dentist.

The Korea Institute of Oriental Medicine is the top research center of TCM in Korea.

=== Malaysia ===
The Traditional and Complementary Medicine Bill was passed by parliament in 2012 establishing the Traditional and Complementary Medicine Council to register and regulate traditional and complementary medicine practitioners, including TCM practitioners as well as other traditional and complementary medicine practitioners such as those in traditional Malay medicine and traditional Indian medicine.

=== Netherlands ===
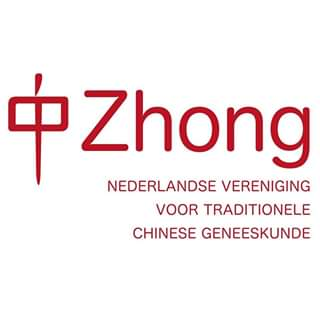
The logo of the Dutch Association of Traditional Chinese Medicine (or 中 Zhong – Nederlandse Vereniging voor Traditionele Chinese Geneeskunde), the largest of the professional organisations that is recognised by private health insurance companies in the Netherlands.

There are no specific regulations in the Netherlands on TCM; TCM is neither prohibited nor recognised by the government of the Netherlands. Chinese herbs as well as Chinese herbal products that are used in TCM are classified as foods and food supplements, and these Chinese herbs can be imported into the Netherlands as well as marketed as such without any type registration or notification to the government.

Despite its status, some private health insurance companies reimburse a certain amount of annual costs for acupuncture treatments, this depends on one's insurance policy, as not all insurance policies cover it, and if the acupuncture practitioner is or is not a member of one of the professional organisations that are recognised by private health insurance companies. The recognized professional organizations include the Nederlandse Vereniging voor Acupunctuur (NVA), Nederlandse Artsen Acupunctuur Vereniging (NAAV), ZHONG, (Nederlandse Vereniging voor Traditionele Chinese Geneeskunde), Nederlandse Beroepsvereniging Chinese Geneeswijzen Yi (NBCG Yi), and Wetenschappelijke Artsen Vereniging voor Acupunctuur in Nederland (WAVAN).

=== New Zealand ===
Although there are no regulatory standards for the practice of TCM in New Zealand, in the year 1990, acupuncture was included in the Governmental Accident Compensation Corporation (ACC) Act. This inclusion granted qualified and professionally registered acupuncturists to provide subsidised care and treatment to citizens, residents, and temporary visitors for work or sports related injuries that occurred within and upon the land of New Zealand. The two bodies for the regulation of acupuncture and attainment of ACC treatment provider status in New Zealand are Acupuncture NZ and The New Zealand Acupuncture Standards Authority.

=== Singapore ===
The TCM Practitioners Act was passed by Parliament in 2000 and the TCM Practitioners Board was established in 2001 as a statutory board under the Ministry of Health, to register and regulate TCM practitioners. The requirements for registration include possession of a diploma or degree from a TCM educational institution/university on a gazetted list, either structured TCM clinical training at an approved local TCM educational institution or foreign TCM registration together with supervised TCM clinical attachment/practice at an approved local TCM clinic, and upon meeting these requirements, passing the Singapore TCM Physicians Registration Examination (STRE) conducted by the TCM Practitioners Board.

In 2024, Nanyang Technological University will offer the four-year Bachelor of Chinese Medicine programme, which is the first local programme accredited by the Ministry of Health.

=== Taiwan ===
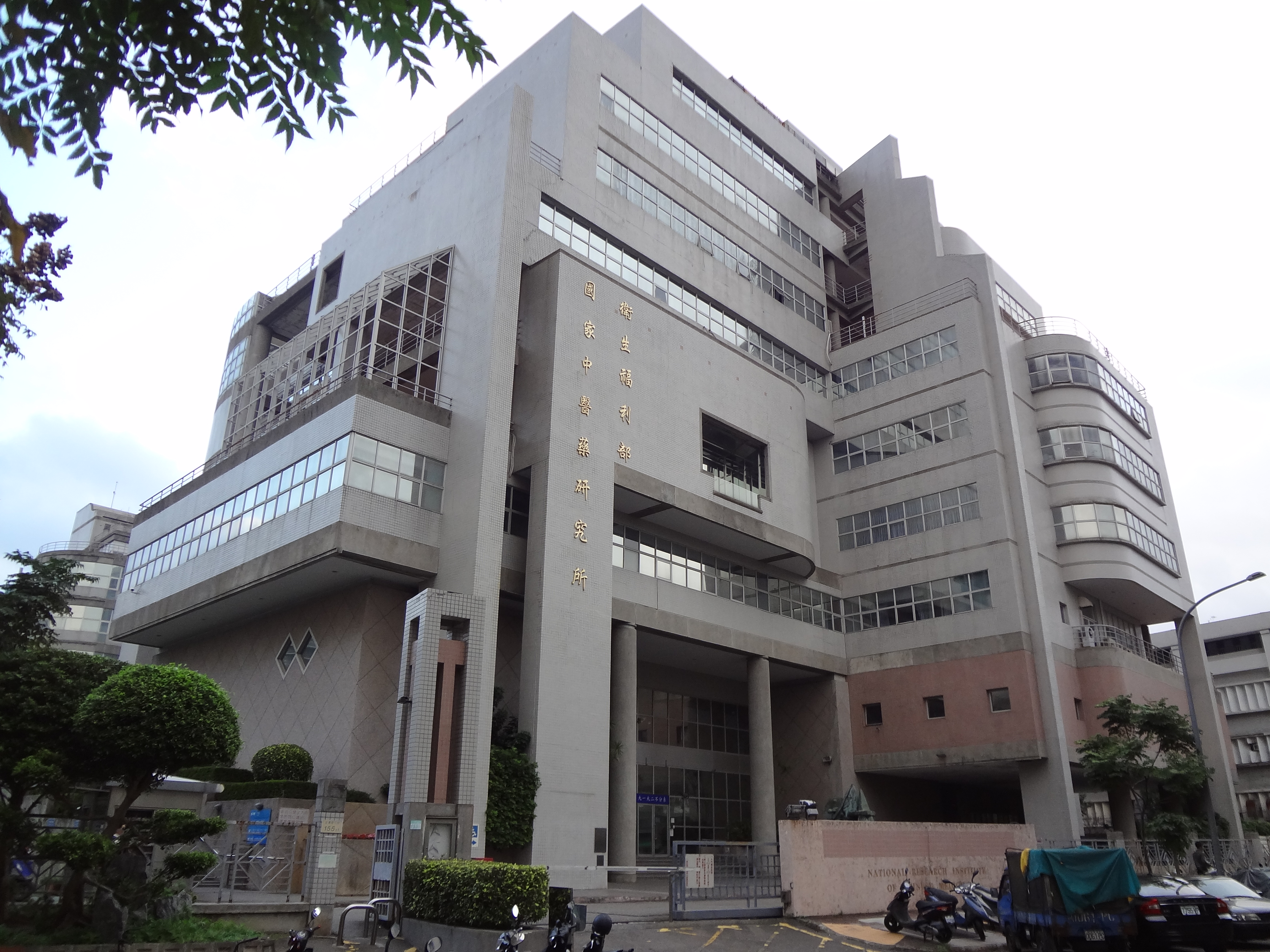
National Research Institute of Chinese Medicine

In Taiwan, TCM practitioners are physicians and are regulated by the Physicians Act. They possess the authority to independently diagnose medical conditions, issue prescriptions, dispense Traditional Chinese Medicine, and prescribe a variety of diagnostic tests including X-rays, ECG, and blood and urine test.

Under current law, those who wish to qualify for the Chinese medicine exam must have obtained a 7-year university degree in TCM.

The National Research Institute of Chinese Medicine, established in 1963, is the largest Chinese herbal medicine research center in Taiwan.

=== United States ===
As of July 2012, only six states lack legislation to regulate the professional practice of TCM: Alabama, Kansas, North Dakota, South Dakota, Oklahoma, and Wyoming. In 1976, California established an Acupuncture Board and became the first state licensing professional acupuncturists.

== See also ==
- Compendium of Materia Medica
- Huangdi Neijing
- American Journal of Chinese Medicine
- The body in traditional Chinese medicine
- Capsicum plaster
- Chinese classic herbal formula
- Chinese food therapy
- Chinese herbology
- Chinese Ophthalmology
- Chinese patent medicine
- Guizhentang Pharmaceutical company
- Hallucinogenic plants in Chinese herbals
- HIV/AIDS and traditional Chinese medicine
- Journal of Traditional Chinese Medicine
- Hua Tuo
- Jin Qian Cao
- Li Shizhen
- List of branches of alternative medicine
- List of topics characterized as pseudoscience
- List of traditional Chinese medicines
- Medicinal mushrooms
- Pharmacognosy
- Public health in the People's Republic of China
- Qingdai
- Qiu Li Gao
- Snake farm
- Sun Simiao
- Tao Hongjing
- Taoist diet
- Traditional Korean medicine
- Traditional Mongolian medicine
- Traditional Vietnamese medicine
- Traditional Tibetan medicine
- Traditional Indian medicine
- Turtle farming
- Xingqi (circulating breath)
- Zhang Jiegu
