= Journal of Traditional Chinese Medicine =

- Language: English
- Edited by: Boli Zhang

Publication details
- History: 1955–present
- Publisher: Academy of Traditional Chinese Medicine
- Frequency: Bimonthly
- Open access: Yes

Standard abbreviations
- ISO 4: J. Tradit. Chin. Med.

Indexing
- CODEN: JTCMEC
- ISSN: 0255-2922
- OCLC no.: 08676745

Links
- Journal homepage; JTCM at Elsevier

The Journal of Traditional Chinese Medicine was the first English-language journal on the subject of traditional Chinese medicine, including acupuncture, herbal medicine, homeopathy, massotherapy, mind-body therapies, palliative care and other topics in complementary and alternative medicine.

The journal was original established in Chinese as Chung i tsa chih ying wen pan in 1955. The English edition of the Journal of Traditional Chinese Medicine was first published in 1981. It is jointly sponsored and published by the China Association of Chinese Medicine and the China Academy of Chinese Medical Sciences. Its headquarters are in Beijing. The journal is also published in German, Italian, Spanish, French and Portuguese editions.

== Abstracting and indexing ==
The journal is abstracted and indexed in the following bibliographic databases:

- EMBASE
- MEDLINE
- Science Citation Index Expanded
- Scopus
