= Wu Prefecture =

Wu Prefecture may refer to:

- Wuzhou (historical prefecture in Hebei), a prefecture in modern Hebei, China in the 9th and 10th centuries
- Wuzhou (historical prefecture in Ningxia and Gansu), a prefecture in modern Ningxia and Gansu, China in the 9th and 10th centuries

== See also ==
- Wu (disambiguation)
- Wuzhou (disambiguation)
