= Yu Prefecture =

Yu Prefecture may refer to:

- Yù Prefecture (蔚州), a prefecture between the 6th and 20th centuries in modern Hebei and Shanxi, China
- Yú Prefecture (渝州), a prefecture between the 6th and 12th centuries in modern Chongqing, China
- Yòu Prefecture or Yu Prefecture (宥州), a prefecture between the 8th and 14th centuries in modern Inner Mongolia, China

== See also ==
- Yu (disambiguation)
- Yuzhou (disambiguation)
