= Wen Prefecture =

Wen Prefecture may refer to:

- Wen Prefecture (Gansu) (文州), a prefecture between the 6th and 14th centuries in modern Gansu, China
- Wen Prefecture (Zhejiang) (溫州), a prefecture between the 7th and 13th centuries in modern Zhejiang, China

== See also ==
- Wen (disambiguation)
