= Jiangnanxi Circuit =

Tang China and Tang provinces

Jiangnanxidao (Chinese: 江南西道, Circuit of Western Jiangnan; Gan: Kongnomsitau) was a southern circuit of Tang Empire. It corresponds to part of present-day Jiangxi, Hubei, Hunan, Anhui. Jiangnanxidao is the origin where the name "Jiangxi" derives from, and its administrative territories also roughly represent nowadays Gan-speaking areas in China.

Jiangnanxidao was split from Jiangnandao in 733 with its capital located in Hongzhou (洪州, Gan: Fungjiu), modern-day Nanchang. Jiangnanxidao was divided into nineteen prefectures, namely:

- Xuanzhou, 宣州
- Shezhou, 歙州
- Chizhou, 池州
- Hongzhou, 洪州
- Jiangzhou, 江州
- Ezhou, 鄂州
- Yuezhou, 岳州
- Raozhou, 饒州
- Qianzhou, 虔州
- Jizhou, 吉州
- Yuanzhou, 袁州
- Xinzhou, 信州
- Fuzhou, 撫州
- Tanzhou, 潭州
- Hengzhou, 衡州
- Yongzhou, 永州
- Daozhou, 道州
- Binzhou, 郴州
- Shaozhou, 邵州
