= 丹州 =

丹州 may refer to:

- All abbreviated name was following Tanshū (丹州)
  - Tanba Province, province of Japan located in what is today central Kyoto and east-central Hyōgo Prefectures
  - Tango Province, province of Japan located in what is today northern Kyoto Prefecture
- Danzhou (丹州), a prefecture between the 6th and 13th centuries in modern Yichuan County, Shaanxi, China
- Danzhou Subdistrict (丹州街道), subdistrict in Yichuan County, Shaanxi, China
