= Duji =

Duji may refer to:

- Duji Circuit (都畿道), circuit of the Tang dynasty, centred on modern Luoyang
- Duji District (杜集区), Huaibei, Anhui, China
- Duji, Yucheng County (杜集镇), town in Yucheng County, Henan, China
- Duji, Ningjin County, Shandong (杜集镇), town in Ningjin County, Shandong, China
- Duji, Nigeria, a small town in northern Nigeria
