= Chenzhou (disambiguation) =

Chenzhou (郴州) is a modern prefecture-level city in Hunan, China.

Chenzhou may also refer to:

- Chenzhou (modern Henan) (陳州), a prefecture between the 6th and 20th centuries in modern Zhoukou, Henan, China
- Chenzhou (modern Huaihua, Hunan) (辰州), a prefecture between the 6th and 20th centuries in modern Huaihua, Hunan, China
