= Yú Prefecture =

Historical administrative division in Chongqing, China

Yúzhou or Yú Prefecture (Chinese: 渝州) was a zhou (prefecture) in imperial China located in modern Chongqing, China. It existed (intermittently) from 581 to 1102, when its name was changed to Gong Prefecture.

== Geography ==
The administrative region of Yu Prefecture in the Tang dynasty is in modern southwestern Chongqing. It probably includes parts of modern:

- Chongqing
- Jiangjin District
- Bishan District
- Yongchuan District
