= Wuzhou (disambiguation) =

Wuzhou is a city in Guangxi, China.

Wuzhou may also refer to:

- Wu Zhou (690–705), as known as Second Zhou, a dynasty founded by Wu Zetian
- Wuzhou Wu, a group of Southern Wu dialects spoken in and around Jinhua in Zhejiang, China.
- Wuzhou Avenue station, a Shanghai Metro station in Shanghai, China
- Wuzhou (historical prefecture in Hebei), a prefecture in modern Hebei, China in the 9th and 10th centuries
- Wuzhou (historical prefecture in Ningxia and Gansu), a prefecture in modern Ningxia and Gansu, China in the 9th and 10th centuries
