= Hezhou (Anhui) =

Prefecture in Anhui, China

Hezhou or He Prefecture (和州) was a zhou (prefecture) in imperial China centering on modern He County, Anhui, China. It existed intermittently from 555 to 1912. Between 1278 and 1291, during the Yuan dynasty, it was known as Hezhou Route (和州路).

== Geography ==
The administrative region of Hezhou in the Tang dynasty is in modern Ma'anshan in eastern Anhui. It probably includes parts of modern:

- He County
- Hanshan County
