= Bian Prefecture =

Imperial Chinese administrative district

Bianzhou or Bian Prefecture (Chinese: 汴州; pinyin: Biànzhōu) was a zhou (prefecture) in imperial China seated in modern Kaifeng, Henan, China. It existed (intermittently) from 576 to Later Jin's reign (936–947).

Eastern Wei first created the Liangzhou and Chengliujung. Northern Qi abolished Kaifengjun which administered Kaifengxian. Northern Zhou Xuandi (578–579) changed the name of Liangzhou to Bianzhou and so Bianshui became its name. The Junyixian was its administrative center, today's Kaifeng. This too was abolished during the Sui Dynasty and the area came under administration of Xingyanjun.

In the year 621, this area was administrated by Zhengzhou, which included Junyixian, Kaifengxian, and Huazhou's Qiuxian.

== Geography ==
The administrative region of Tongzhou in the Tang dynasty is in modern Henan:

- Under the administration of Kaifeng:
  - Kaifeng
  - Kaifeng County
  - Qi County
  - Tongxu County
  - Weishi County
  - Lankao County
- Under the administration of Xinxiang:
  - Fengqiu County

== See also ==
- Chenliu Commandery
- Kaifeng Prefecture
