= Yuzhou =

Yuzhou may refer to:

== Yùzhōu (豫州) ==
- Yuzhou (ancient China) (豫州), one of the nine provinces of ancient China
- Yuzhou (豫州), a former prefecture in roughly modern Runan County, Henan, China
- Yuzhou (豫州), a former prefecture in modern Anhui, China
- Yuzhou (豫州), a former prefecture in roughly modern Hua County, Henan, China
- Yuzhou (豫州), a former prefecture in roughly modern Dali County, Shaanxi, China
- Yuzhou (豫州), a former prefecture in roughly modern Xingyang, Henan, China
- Yuzhou (豫州), a former prefecture in roughly modern Jarud Banner, Inner Mongolia, China

== Others ==
- Yuzhou, Henan (禹州), a city in Henan, China
- Yuzhou District (玉州区), Yulin, Guangxi, China
- Yuzhou (historical prefecture) (蔚州), seated in modern Yu County, Hebei, China
  - Yuzhou (蔚州镇), a town in modern Yu County, Hebei, China
- Yuzhou (渝州), a former prefecture in modern Chongqing, China

== See also ==
- Youzhou, sometimes written Yu Chou in older works
