= Ying Prefecture (Hubei) =

Historical administrative division in Hubei, China

Yingzhou or Ying Prefecture (郢州) was a zhou (prefecture) in imperial China in modern Hubei, China, seated in modern Zhongxiang. It existed (intermittently) from 551 until 1278.

== Geography ==
The administrative region of Yingzhou in the Tang dynasty falls within modern Jingmen in central Hubei. It probably includes parts of modern:

- Zhongxiang
- Jingshan County
