= Feng Prefecture (Shaanxi) =

Historical administrative division in Shaanxi, China

Fengzhou or Feng Prefecture (鳳州) was a zhou (prefecture) in imperial China, centering on modern Feng County, Shaanxi, China. It was created in 554 by Western Wei and existed (intermittently) until 1374 during the Ming dynasty.

== Geography ==
The administrative region of Feng Prefecture in the Tang dynasty is in the border area of modern southeastern Gansu and southwestern Shaanxi. It probably includes parts of modern:

- Under the administration of Baoji, Shaanxi:
  - Feng County
- Under the administration of Longnan City, Gansu:
  - Hui County
  - Liangdang County

== Bibliography ==
- Shi Weile, ed. (2005). Zhongguo Lishi Diming Da Cidian (中国历史地名大词典) [Large Dictionary of Chinese Historical Place Names] (in Chinese). China Social Sciences Press. pp. 478–479. ISBN 7-5004-4929-1.
