= Rao Prefecture =

Prefecture in imperial China

Raozhou or Rao Prefecture (饒州) was a zhou (prefecture) in imperial China centering on modern Poyang County, Jiangxi, China in northeastern Jiangxi at the southeastern shore of the Poyang Lake. In the Yuan, Ming and Qing dynasties it was known as Raozhou Prefecture (饒州路 or 饒州府).
