= Gui Prefecture (Guangxi) =

Historical administrative division in Guangxi, China

Guizhou or Gui Prefecture (桂州) was a zhou (prefecture) in imperial China centering on modern Guilin, Guangxi, China. It existed (intermittently) from 507 to 1133.

== Geography ==
The administrative region of Guizhou in the Tang dynasty falls within modern Guilin in northeastern Guangxi. It probably includes modern:

- Guilin
- Yangshuo County
- Lingchuan County
- Xing'an County
- Lingui County
