= Gui Prefecture (Hubei) =

Historical administrative division in Hubei, China

Guizhou or Gui Prefecture (歸州) was a zhou (prefecture) in imperial China centering on modern Zigui County, Hubei, China. In the Yuan dynasty it was briefly called Guizhou Military Commission (歸州安撫司) and Guizhou Route (歸州路). It existed (intermittently) from 619 until 1912.

== Geography ==
The administrative region of Guizhou in the Tang dynasty is in modern western Hubei. It probably includes modern:

- Under the administration of Yichang:
  - Zigui County
  - Xingshan County
- Under the administration of Enshi Tujia and Miao Autonomous Prefecture:
  - Badong County
