= Wen Prefecture (Zhejiang) =

Historical administrative division in Zhejiang, China

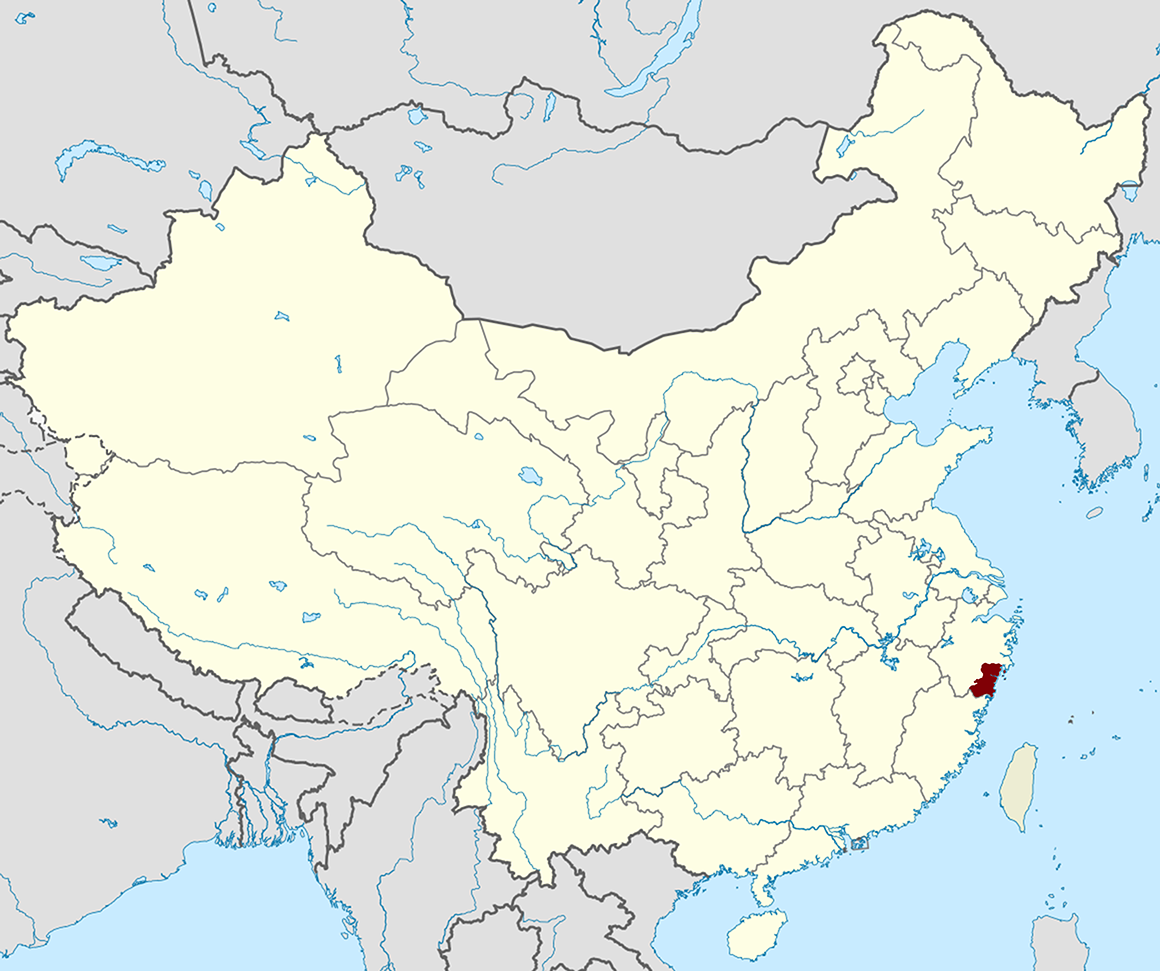
- Traditional Chinese: 溫州
- Simplified Chinese: 温州
Transcriptions
Standard Mandarin
- Hanyu Pinyin: Wēn Zhōu
- Wade–Giles: Wen^{1} Chou^{1}

Wenzhou or Wen Prefecture was a zhou (prefecture) in imperial China, centering on modern Wenzhou, Zhejiang, China. It existed (intermittently) from 675 to 1265, when the Song dynasty renamed it Rui'an Prefecture.

The modern prefecture-level city Wenzhou, created in 1949, retains its name.

== Geography ==
The administrative region of Wen Prefecture in the Tang dynasty was in southeastern coastal Zhejiang, under the administration of Wenzhou. It probably includes parts of modern:

- Wenzhou
- Yueqing
- Yongjia County

== See also ==
- Yongjia Commandery
- Rui'an Prefecture
