= Tan Prefecture (Beijing) =

Historical administrative division in Beijing, China

Tanzhou or Tan Prefecture (Chinese: 檀州) was a zhou (prefecture) in imperial China, centering on modern Miyun County, Beijing, China. It existed (intermittently) from 596 to 1368. In the 10th century it was ceded by Later Jin to the Khitan-ruled Liao dynasty as one of the Sixteen Prefectures.

== Geography ==
The administrative region of Tan Prefecture in the Tang dynasty is in modern Beijing. It probably includes parts of modern:

- Miyun County
- Huairou District
- Pinggu District
