= Guó Prefecture =

Historical administrative division in Henan, China

Guozhou or Guo Prefecture (虢州) was a zhou (prefecture) in imperial China, centering on modern Sanmenxia, Henan, China. It existed (intermittently) from 583 until 1271.

== Geography ==
The administrative region of Guozhou in the Tang dynasty is in modern Sanmenxia in western Henan on the border with Shaanxi. It probably includes parts of modern:

- Lingbao City
- Lushi County
