= Jiangnan Circuit =

- Chinese: 江南道 or 江南路
Transcriptions
Standard Mandarin
- Hanyu Pinyin: Jiāngnán Dào / Jiāngnán Lù

Tang dynasty circuits

Jiangnan Circuit or Jiangnan Province was one of the major circuits during the Tang dynasty, Five Dynasties period, and early Song dynasty. During the Tang dynasty it was known as Jiangnan Dao (江南道), and during the Song dynasty Jiangnan Lu (江南路), but both dao and lu can be translated as "circuit". In 1020 it was divided into 2 circuits: Jiangnan East Circuit and Jiangnan West Circuit.

During the Tang dynasty, its administrative area included Zhejiang, Fujian, Jiangxi, Hunan, as well as some parts of Jiangsu, Anhui, Hubei, Sichuan and Guizhou, with its capital in Suzhou.

Its name – "South of the River" – refers to its location south of the Yangtze.

West Jiangnan, the future eponym of modern Jiangxi, was later separated from it.

== See also ==
- Tang dynasty
- Administrative divisions of the Tang dynasty
- History of the administrative divisions of China
