= Shao Prefecture =

Historical administrative division in Hunan, China

Shaozhou or Shao Prefecture (邵州) was a zhou (prefecture) in imperial China centering on modern Shaoyang, Hunan, China. It existed (intermittently) from 636 to 1225.

== Geography ==
The administrative region of Shaozhou in the Tang dynasty falls within modern Shaoyang in southern Hunan on the northern border with Guangxi. It probably includes modern:

- Shaoyang
- Shaoyang County
- Wugang
- Xinning County
- Longhui County
- Xinshao County
