= Guǒ Prefecture =

Historical administrative division in Sichuan, China

Guozhou or Guo Prefecture (果州) was a zhou (prefecture) in imperial China, centering on modern Nanchong, Sichuan, China. It existed (intermittently) from 621 until 1227. Between 771 and 775 it was known as Chongzhou or Chong Prefecture (充州).

== Geography ==
The administrative region of Guozhou in the Tang dynasty is in modern northeastern Sichuan. It probably includes parts of modern:

- Under the administration of Nanchong:
  - Nanchong
  - Peng'an County
  - Yingshan County
  - Xichong County
- Under the administration of Guang'an:
  - Yuechi County
