= Hebei Circuit =

- Chinese: 河北道 or 河北路
Transcriptions
Standard Mandarin
- Hanyu Pinyin: Héběi Dào / Héběi Lù

Hebei Circuit or Hebei Province was one of the major circuits during the Tang dynasty, Five Dynasties period, and early Song dynasty. During the Tang dynasty it was known as Hebei Dao (河北道), and during the Song dynasty Hebei Lu (河北路), but both dao and lu can be translated as "circuit". In 1042 it was divided into two circuits: Hebei East Circuit and Hebei West Circuit.

Its administrative area corresponds to roughly the modern provinces and cities of Beijing, Tianjin, and Hebei, as well as parts of northern Shandong and northern Henan. During the mid-Tang dynasty it also contained much of modern western Liaoning but that area was afterwards annexed by the Liao dynasty.
