= Wen Prefecture (Gansu) =

Former administrative division of China

Wenzhou or Wen Prefecture (文州) was a zhou (prefecture) in imperial China seated in modern Wen County in Gansu, China. It existed (intermittently) from 558 to 1371.

== Geography ==
Its administrative area is not well-known, but Wenzhou was on one of the few accessible routes to modern Sichuan and therefore a strategic prefecture.
