= Dao Prefecture =

Historical administrative division in Hunan, China

Daozhou or Dao Prefecture (道州) was a zhou (prefecture) in imperial China centering on modern Dao County, Hunan, China. In the Yuan dynasty it was known as Daozhou Route (道州路) and in the Ming dynasty (briefly) as Daozhou Prefecture (道州府). It existed (intermittently) from 634 to 1913.

== Geography ==
The administrative region of Daozhou in the Tang dynasty falls within modern Yongzhou in southern Hunan. It probably includes modern:

- Dao County
- Jiangyong County
- Ningyuan County
- Xintian County
- Jianghua Yao Autonomous County
