= Danzhou (modern Shaanxi) =

Historical administrative division in Shaanxi, China

Danzhou or Dan Prefecture (丹州) was a zhou (prefecture) in imperial China, with its seat in modern Yichuan County, Shaanxi. It existed intermittently from 554 until 1269, when the territory fell to the Mongols.
