= Yu Prefecture (Hebei) =

Historical administrative division in Hebei, China

Yu Prefecture, also known by its Chinese name Yuzhou (蔚州) and as Weizhou or Wei Prefecture, was a prefecture (zhou) of imperial China, centered on present-day Yu County, Hebei. It was one of the Sixteen Prefectures ceded by Later Jin to the Khitan-ruled Liao dynasty.

Yuzhou, the seat of Yu County, retains its name.

== Geography ==
The administrative region of Yuzhou in the Tang dynasty is the border area of western Hebei and northern Shanxi:

- Under the administration of Zhangjiakou, Hebei:
  - Yu County
  - Yangyuan County
- Under the administration of Baoding, Hebei:
  - Laiyuan County
- Under the administration of Datong, Shanxi:
  - Tianzhen County
  - Yanggao County
  - Guangling County
  - Lingqiu County
