= Qianzhong Commandery =

Qianzhong Commandery (Chinese: 黔中郡) was a historical commandery of the state of Chu during the Warring States period (481 BC – 221 BC). It was mentioned in the section Biography of Su Qin (Chinese: 蘇秦列傳) of Sima Qian's Records of the Grand Historian or Strategies of the Warring States. It is located roughly in modern-day western Hunan and eastern Guizhou. The seat of Qianzhong Commandery was in present-day Yuanling County, with the historic site centered 10 kilometres (6.2 mi) west of the seat of the county.
