= Chenzhou (modern Huaihua, Hunan) =

Historical administrative division in Hunan, China

Chenzhou or Chen Prefecture (辰州) was a zhou (prefecture) in imperial China seated in modern Yuanling County, Hunan, China. It existed (intermittently) from the 6th century to 1913.

Between 1364 and 1913 during the Ming dynasty and Qing dynasty it was known as Chenzhou Prefecture (辰州府).

== Geography ==
The administrative region of Chenzhou in the Tang dynasty is under the administration of modern Huaihua in western Hunan:

- Yuanling County
- Chenxi County
- Xupu County
- Huaihua
- Zhongfang County
- Hongjiang
