= Lingnan West Circuit =

Tang dynasty administrative district

Lingnan West Circuit (traditional Chinese: 嶺南西道; simplified Chinese: 岭南西道; pinyin: Lǐngnánxīdào) was a circuit of China during the Tang dynasty.

== See also ==
- Lingnan Circuit
- Tang dynasty
- Administration of territory in dynastic China
