= Gong Prefecture =

Historical administrative division in Guangxi, China

Gongzhou or Gong Prefecture (龔州) was a zhou (prefecture) in imperial China centering on modern Pingnan County, Guangxi, China. It existed (intermittently) from 633 to 1136.
