= Wuzhou (historical prefecture in Ningxia and Gansu) =

Former administrative division of China

Wuzhou, or Wu Prefecture (武州), was a zhou (prefecture) in imperial China. It is in the border area of what is now southern Ningxia and Gansu, China. It was abolished in 958 under Later Zhou.

== Geography ==
The administrative region of Wuzhou in the Tang dynasty is in modern Zhangjiakou, Hebei. It probably includes these areas:

- Under the administration of Pingliang, Gansu:
  - Pingliang
- Under the administration of Zhongwei, Ningxia:
  - Haiyuan County
- Under the administration of Guyuan, Ningxia:
  - Guyuan
  - Xiji County
  - Jingyuan County
  - Longde County
  - Pengyang County
