= Wuzhou (in modern Hebei) =

Historical administrative division in Hebei, China

Wuzhou or Wu Prefecture (武州) was a zhou (prefecture) in imperial China, centering on modern Xuanhua County, Hebei, China. It was created in 851 by the Tang dynasty and was later ceded by Later Jin to the Khitan-ruled Liao dynasty as one of the Sixteen Prefectures.

== Geography ==
The administrative region of Wuzhou in the Tang dynasty is in modern Zhangjiakou, Hebei. It probably includes parts of modern:

- Zhangjiakou
- Xuanhua County
- Wanquan County
