= Duji Circuit =

Duji (Chinese: 都畿道; pinyin: Dūjī Dào) was a circuit of the Chinese Táng Empire. It was established by Emperor Xuánzōng and covered today's Luòyáng (then Dōngdū / Henan Prefecture [Hénán Fǔ]) and the area around it. Duji Circuit was succeeded by the Song dynasty's Jingxibei Circuit (Jīngxīběi Dào). It contained three prefectures: Dōngdū (東都), Luòzhōu (洛州), and Rǔzhōu (汝州).
