= Zhou (administrative division) =

Historical administrative and political division of China

Chinese name
- Chinese: 州
Transcriptions
Standard Mandarin
- Hanyu Pinyin: zhōu
- Wade–Giles: chou^{1}
Yue: Cantonese
- Jyutping: zau^{1}
Southern Min
- Hokkien POJ: chiu

Vietnamese name
- Vietnamese alphabet: châu

Korean name
- Hangul: 주
Transcriptions
- Revised Romanization: ju
- McCune–Reischauer: chu

Japanese name
- Hiragana: しゅう
Transcriptions
- Revised Hepburn: shū

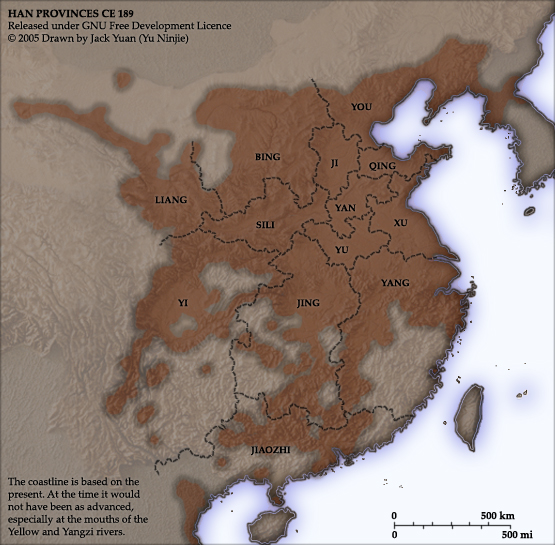
Han dynasty zhou in 189 CE.

Zhou (Chinese: 州; pinyin: zhōu; lit. 'land') were historical administrative and political divisions of China. Formally established during the Han dynasty, zhou existed continuously for over 2000 years until the 1912 establishment of the Republic of China. Zhou were also once used in Korea (주, ju), Vietnam (Vietnamese: châu) and Japan (Hepburn: shū).

== Overview ==
Zhou typically gets translated into several terms in the English language: provinces, prefectures or departments.

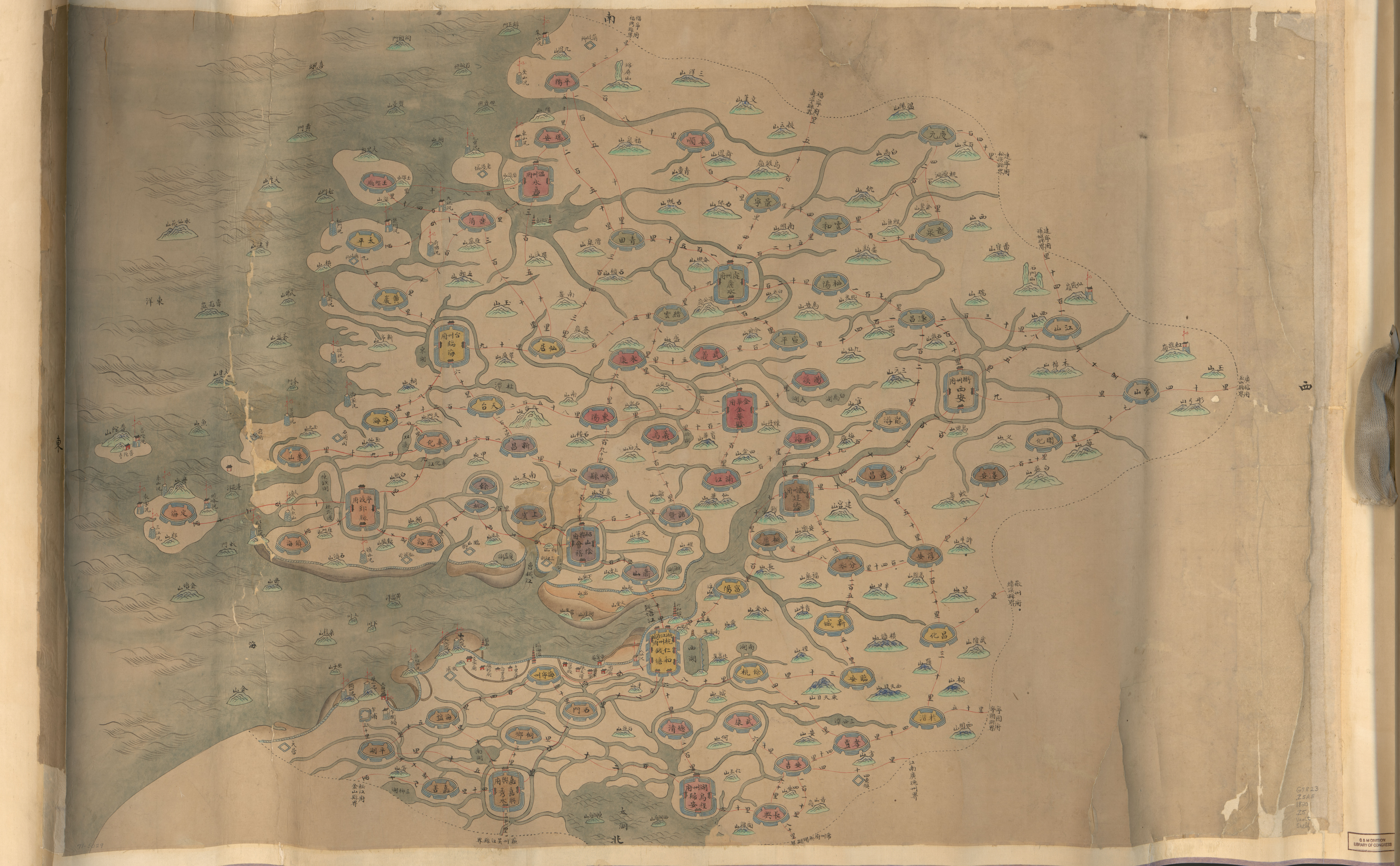
A mid-Qing map of Zhejiang Provinces, with all prefecture capitals indicated (杭州府 Hangzhou-fu, 温州府 Wenzhou-fu, 金华府 Jinhua-fu, etc.). Directions are reversed; south is on top and east is on the left.

The Tang dynasty also established fǔ (府, "prefectures"), zhou of special importance such as capitals and other major cities. By the Ming and Qing, fǔ became predominant divisions within Chinese provinces. In Ming and Qing, the word fǔ (府) was typically attached to the name of each prefecture's capital city, thus both Chinese and Western maps and geographical works would often call the respective cities Hangzhou-fu, Wenzhou-fu, Wuchang-fu, etc.

After the Meiji Restoration, fu was also used in Japanese for the urban prefectures of the most important cities; today, it is still used in the Japanese names for the Osaka and Kyoto Prefectures.

In the People's Republic of China, zhou today exists only in the designation "autonomous prefecture" (Chinese: 自治州; pinyin: zìzhìzhōu), administrative areas for China's designated minorities. However, zhou have left a huge mark on Chinese place names, including the province of Guizhou and the major cities of Guangzhou, Fuzhou, Hangzhou, Lanzhou, and Suzhou, among many others. Likewise, although modern Korean, Vietnamese, and Japanese provinces are no longer designated by zhou cognates, the older terms survive in various place names, notably the Japanese islands of Honshu and Kyushu, the Korean province Jeju-do, and Lai Châu in Vietnam.

== History ==
Zhou were first mentioned in ancient Chinese texts, notably the Yu Gong or Tribute of Yu, section of the Book of Documents. All agreed on the division of China into nine zhou, though they differed on their names and position. These zhou were geographical concepts, not administrative entities.

The Han dynasty was the first to formalize the zhou into actual administrative divisions by establishing 13 zhou all across China. Because these zhou were the largest divisions of the China at the time, they are usually translated as "provinces". After the Han dynasty, however, the number of zhou began to increase. By the time of the Sui dynasty, there were over a hundred zhou all across China.

The Sui and Tang dynasties merged zhou with the next level down, the commanderies or jùn (郡). The Tang also added another level on top: the circuit or dào (道). Henceforth, zhou were lowered to second-level status, and the word becomes translated into English as "prefecture". Thereafter, zhou continued to survive as second- or third-level political divisions until the Qing dynasty.

The Republic of China abolished zhou altogether, leaving the word only in the names of cities such as Guangzhou and Hangzhou. The People's Republic of China recycled the name, using it to refer to the autonomous prefectures granted to various ethnicities.

== See also ==
- Administrative divisions of China
- Provinces of China
