= Yingzhou =

Yingzhou may refer to:

- Yingzhou District (颍州区) in Fuyang, Anhui, China
- Yingzhou Subdistrict (瀛洲街道) in Taijiang District, Fuzhou, Fujian, China
- Yingzhoulu (瀛州) a subdistrict (a former town) in Hejian, Cangzhou, Hebei, China
- Yingzhou (瀛洲), a Chinese mythological island in Mount Penglai where immortals live
- Yingzhou Ecological Park (瀛洲生态公园) in Guangzhou, Guangdong, China

== Towns ==
- Yingzhou, Jixi County (瀛洲) in Jixi County, Anhui, China
- Yingzhou, Hainan (英州) in Lingshui Li Autonomous County, Hainan, China
- Yingzhou, Hebei (瀛州), a former town in Hejian, Cangzhou, Hebei, China

== Historical prefectures ==
- Ying Prefecture (Anhui) (潁州), a prefecture between the 6th and 20th centuries in modern Anhui, China
- Ying Prefecture (Shanxi) (應州), a prefecture between the 9th and 20th centuries in modern Shanxi, China
- Ying Prefecture (Hubei) (郢州), a prefecture between the 6th and 13th centuries in modern Hubei, China
- Ying Prefecture (Hebei) (瀛州), a prefecture between the 5th and 12th centuries in modern Hebei, China
- Ying Prefecture (Liaoning) (營州), a prefecture between the 6th and 10th centuries in modern Liaoning, China
- Ying Prefecture (Guangdong) (英州), a prefecture between the 10th and 12th centuries in modern Guangdong, China

== See also ==
- Yingzhoulu (瀛州路), a subdistrict in Hejian, Cangzhou, Hebei, China
- Ying (disambiguation)
- Ying Zhou (disambiguation)
