= Li Hui =

Li Hui or Hui Li may refer to:

- Li Hui (Three Kingdoms) (died 231), minister of the Kingdom of Shu during the Three Kingdoms period of China
- Li Hui (Tang Dynasty), Tang Dynasty chancellor
- Li Hui (Northern Qi), official of the Northern Qi Dynasty
- Li Hui (wrestler) (born 1985), female Chinese freestyle wrestler
- Li Hui (swimmer), female Chinese swimmer, former world record holder in the short-course 50-metre backstroke
- Li Hui (artist), artist, based in Beijing
- Li Hui (diplomat), diplomat of the PRC
- Li Hui (footballer) (born 1960), Chinese football forward
- Hui Li (electrical engineer), Chinese-American electrical engineer

== See also ==
- Huili (disambiguation)
