= List of sources of Chinese culinary history =

This is a list of historical Chinese sources referring to Chinese cuisine. Not long after the expansion of the Chinese Empire during the Qin dynasty (221–207 BC) and Han dynasty (202 BC – 220 AD), Chinese writers noted the great differences in culinary practices among people from different parts of the realm. These differences followed to a great extent the varying climate and availability of foodstuffs in China.

== Pre-Han dynasty ==
Documents compiled before 206 BC.

Title	Chinese name	Date	Author	Description
Zhouli zhushu (Notes and Commentaries on the Rites of Zhou)	simplified Chinese: 周礼注疏; traditional Chinese: 周禮注疏		Government officials	An annotated version of the Rites of Zhou
Yili zhushu (Ceremonies and Rites with Commentaries)	仪礼注疏; 儀禮注疏			Banquet rites, single food offering rites, secondary food offering rites, and other rites mentioned
Liji zhengyi (Book of Rites)	礼记正义; 禮記正義			Eight different delicacies and others are mentioned.
Lüshi Chunqiu (Master Lü's Spring and Autumn [Annals])	吕氏春秋; 呂氏春秋	c. 239 BC during the Qin dynasty	Under the patronage of Lü Buwei	An encyclopedic Chinese classic text compilation (Basic Taste)
Simin yueling jiaozhu (The Four Groups Practice Calendar)	四民月令	mid 2 AD	Eastern Han dynasty Minister Official Que Shi	A book of mainly agricultural practices where food related topics are partially mentioned

== Pre-Sui states ==
Documents from before the Sui dynasty (581–618).

Title	Chinese name	Date	Author	Description
Shijing (Classic of Poetry)	simplified Chinese: 诗经; traditional Chinese: 詩經	1000–600 BC	Northern Wei dynasty Lu Shi	A collection of poetry from the 11th to 7th centuries BC
Nanfang Caomu Zhuang (Plants of the Southern Regions)	南方草木状; 南方草木狀	Claims to have been completed in 304 AD. Often considered a Song-era forgery.	Western Jin dynasty scholar and botanist Ji Han (嵇含)	Chinese subtropical flora
Qinjing (Book of Birds)	禽经; 禽經			The naming of birds with their characteristics and other elements
Shizhen lu (Food record)	食珍录; 食珍錄	Northern and Southern dynasties era	Yu Cong	Recipe book with a focus on southern cuisine
Qimin Yaoshu (Essential Methods of the Common People)	齐民要术; 齊民要術	533 and 544 BC	Northern Wei dynasty official Jia Sixie	Ancient Chinese agricultural texts (Section of Volumes 1–7)

== Sui dynasty ==
Documents compiled during the Sui dynasty (581–618).

Title	Chinese name	Date	Author	Description
Shijing (Book of Foods)	食经		Sui dynasty Xie Feng	The book collects 53 cuisines of various types from the Northern and Southern Dynasties and the Sui Dynasty.
Beitang shuchao (Excerpts of Books in the Northern Hall)	simplified Chinese: 北堂书钞; traditional Chinese: 北堂書鈔		Yu Shinan, an official and calligrapher	The oldest surviving leishu, which is a kind of Chinese reference book or encyclopedia. Includes a chapter covering beverages and foods.

== Tang dynasty ==
Documents compiled during the Tang dynasty (618–907).

Title	Chinese name	Date	Author	Description
Yiwen Leiju (Encyclopedia of Arts and Letters)	藝文類聚 艺文类聚		Ouyang Xun, a calligrapher	А poetic encyclopedia; book 72 covers food.
Beiji qianjin yaofang (Essential Formulas Worth a Thousand Gold)	備急千金要方 备急千金要方		Sun Simiao, known as the King of Medicine	Along with Qian Jin Yi Fang (Supplement to the Formulas Worth a Thousand Gold), both significantly contributed to the development of Chinese medicine. Book 26 refers to food treatments.
Shipu (Recipe Manuals)	食譜 食谱		Wei Juyuan	A menu from a banquet hosted by Wei Juyuan to thank the emperor for his promotion. It lists 58 dishes and includes descriptions of their cooking methods and ingredients.
Shiliao bencao (Materia Medica for Successful Dietary Therapy)	食療本草 食疗本草	684 or 701 – 704 and 721–739	Meng Shen and Zhang Ding	The earliest complete dietary work. Based on Meng Shen's book Buyang fang (Prescription to Replenish and Nourish), Zhang Ding expanded it and renamed it as such. (Fragment)
Chajing (The Classic of Tea)	茶經 茶经	written between 760 and 780	Lu Yu	The very first monograph on tea in the world that records Chinese methods of tea cultivation and preparation
Jiancha shuiji (Note on Brewing Tea)	煎茶水記 煎茶水记		Zhang Youxin (張又新), a tea expert	Discusses the way of tea brewing and suggests a trend towards more study of tea
Shiyi xinjian (A Revised Mirror for the Dietitian)	食醫心鑑 食医心鉴	published in 850	Unknown	Food therapy
Youyang zazu (Miscellaneous Morsels from Youyang)	酉陽雑俎 酉阳杂俎	published approximately in 853	Duan Chengshi	A miscellany of Chinese and foreign legends and hearsay, reports on natural phenomena, short anecdotes, and tales of the wondrous and mundane, as well as notes on such topics as medicinal herbs, tattoos, wine and foods.
Lingbiao lu yiji (Strange Southern Ways of Men and Things)	嶺表錄異記 岭表录异记	written between 889 and 904	Liu Xun (劉恂)	A book documenting the climate, environment, products, and customs of southern China during the Tang Dynasty. More than 60% of its content is related to food, including descriptions of ingredients, unique delicacies, cooking and dining utensils, and culinary customs.
Shanfujing shoulu (The Manuscript of the Diet Minister's Classic)	膳夫經手錄 膳夫经手录	856	Yang Yezhuan	Introduces many formulae for diet therapy

== Song dynasty ==
Documents compiled during the Song dynasty (960–1279). The population of China doubled in size during the 10th and 11th centuries. This growth came through expanded rice cultivation in central and southern China, the use of early-ripening rice from southeast and southern Asia, and the production of abundant food surpluses.

Title	Chinese name	Date	Author	Description
Shanfulu (Chef's Manuals)	膳夫錄 膳夫录	Southern Song	Zheng Wang (鄭望)	A cookbook consists of 14 entries with descriptions of the processing and preparation of delicacies
Shipu	食譜 食谱			
Qingyilu (Records of the Unworldly and the Strange)	淸異錄 清异录	950	Tao Gu	A collection of more than 600 historical records and anecdotes spanned from Sui, Tang, the Five Dynasties and the early Song dynasty, under 37 categories including fine cuisines, vegetables, and fruits.
Taiping Yulan (Imperial Readings of the Taiping Era)	太平御覽 太平御览	977 to 983	Li Fang	An encyclopedia (Volumes 843–867 are on diets)
Sunpu (Treatise on Bamboo Shoots)	筍譜 笋谱	c. 970	Zang Ning, a monk	Recorded 98 kinds of bamboo shoot about heir names and aliases, characteristics, cultivation, tastes, processing and preservation methods
Benxinzhai shushipu (Vegetarian Recipes from the Study of the True Heart)	本心齋蔬食譜 本心斋蔬食谱	13th century	Chen Dasou (陳達叟)	Lists 20 vegetarian foods with recipes.
Shanjia qinggong (The Simple Foods of the Mountain Folk)	山家淸供 山家清供	13th century	Lin Hong	This cookbook introduces food and beverages of hermits in the mountains and usages of sugar in cookery. It also mentions a cultural proverb related to pasta.
Rucao jishi	茹草记事	Published in 1646	Lin Hong; Tao Zongyi; Tao Ting	
Shidafu shishi wuguan (Five Considerations When Scholar-officials Eat)*	士大夫食時五觀 士大夫食时五观	between 1045 and 1105	Huang Tingjian, a calligrapher	Deals with five points of etiquette for shidafu (gentlemen or officials) when eating meat
Shouqin yanglao xinshu (A New Book on Supporting Parents for Longevity)	壽親養老新書 寿亲养老新书	1307	Zou Xuan	A book mainly discusses the knowledge and methods of health care for the elderly, including dietary management, food preparation and other health care contents.
Beishan jiujing (The Wine Classic of North Mountain)	北山酒經 北山酒经	between 1535 and 1615	Zhu Gong (朱肱)	The first book extant entirely focused on wine and wine making
Yushipi (Fine Dishes Notes)	玉食批	Song Dynasty	Unnamed royal kitchen servant	A list of fine dishes served as daily meals to the princes of Emperor Lizong.
Chalu (The Record of Tea)	茶錄 茶录		Cai Xiang	A renowned tea book
Lizhi pu (Note on the Lychee)	荔枝譜 荔枝谱	1059	Cai Xiang	The first monograph on any fruit tree written by a Chinese writer, in which over 30 varieties of fruit are mentioned including the lychee
Dongxi shichalu (Dongxi Tea Tasting Record)	東溪試茶錄 东溪试茶录	circa 1064	Song Zi'an	A record of tasting teas from various origins in the region of today's Fujian, and analyzing their making process
Pincha yaolu (Essentials in Tea Tasting)	品茶要錄 品茶要录	1075	Huang Ru	A collection of 10 articles on practices that should be avoided in tea making, and the influence of geographical conditions on tea quality
Jiupu	食经			
Julu (Note on Oranges)	橘錄 橘录	1178	Han Yanzhi	A record of 27 citrus species around Wenzhou and their characteristics and cultivation methods
Tangshuang pu (Book of Crystal Sugar)	糖霜譜 糖霜谱	1154	Wang Zhuo	The first ancient Chinese monograph on sugarcane cultivation and cane sugar production methods
Xuanhe Era Tea Tribute from Beiyuan	宣和北苑貢茶錄 宣和北苑贡茶录	1121-1125	Xiong Fan	A record of 41 tea products from Fujian offered as tribute to Emperor Huizong of Song
Beiyuan Tea Tribute Addendum	北苑別錄 北苑别录	1186	Zhao Ruli	A supplement descriptive record to Xuanhe Era Tea Tribute from Beiyuan
Xiepu (Notes on Crabs)	蟹譜 蟹谱	1059	Fu Gong	The earliest records of knowledges on crabs in China
Xielüe (Crab Charts)	蟹略	Southern Song	Gao Sisun	A collection of knowledges and cultures about crabs in China as of Song Dynasty
Junpu (Mushroom Manual)	菌譜 菌谱	Southern Song	Chen Renyu	A documentation of 11 species of edible mushrooms, the earliest of its kind in China
Dongjing Meng Hua Lu	東京夢華錄箋注 东京梦华录	1127	Meng Yuanlao fl. 1126–1147	Journal of daily life in Kaifeng of 1102~1125
Ducheng jisheng (The Famous Sages of the Capital)	都城紀勝 都城纪胜	1235	Nai De Weng	Descriptively recorded the life of the citizens and the prosperity of commerce in Lin'an, the capital of the Southern Song Dynasty
Wulin jiu shi	武林舊事 武林旧事		Zhou Mi	Recollections of past urban life in Lin'an, the capital of the Southern Song dynasty
Nan Song shisi ji (Marketplaces and Shops in Southern Song)	南宋市肆记		Zhou Mi	Originally a volume of Wulin jiu shi, recorded all kinds of markets and shops in Lin'an.
Mengliang lu (Records of Dreams of Glory)	夢粱錄 梦粱录		Wu Zimu	From the imperial court ceremonies to commoner's diet and daily life, another recollections of Lin'an.
Wushi Zhongkuilu	吳氏中饋錄 吴氏中馈录		Madame Wu	The earliest Chinese cookbook written by a woman and one of the first to mention the use of soy sauce
Fanshenglu or Xihulaoren fanshenglu	繁胜录 or 西湖老人繁勝錄			A record of the urban life in Lin'an, similar to the Ducheng jisheng

== Jin dynasty ==
Documents compiled during the Jin dynasty (1115–1234).

Title	Chinese name	Date	Author	Description
Shiwu bencao (Materia Medica on Food)	食物本草		Li Gao (李杲), a major medical scholar of the time	A compilation of the rich documents on food as medicine in China as of the Ming dynasty.

== Yuan dynasty ==
During the Yuan dynasty (1271–1368), contacts with the West also brought the introduction to China of a major food crop, sorghum, along with other foreign food products and methods of preparation.

Title	Chinese name	Date	Author	Description
Nongshu (Agricultural Treatise)	農書 农书	1149	Chen Fu	Deals with paddy rice farming and sericulture in southern China
Riyong bencao (Materia Medica for Daily Use)	日用本草	1367	Wu Rui, an official medical authority	One of famous works on dietetics written in the Yuan dynasty. It lists of 540 common foods with medicinal properties.
Yinshan zhengyao (Orthodox Essentials of Dietetics)	飮膳正要 饮膳正要		Hu Sihui, an imperial dietary physician	The book, that defines essential diets for a healthy person, is regarded as the first systematic document on nutritional principles in China.
Nongsang yishi cuoyao (Fundamentals of Agriculture and Sericulture for Food and Clothes)	農桑衣食撮要 农桑衣食撮要	1314	Lu Mingshan	Sugarcane and sugar manufacturing
Yinshi xuzhi (Must Known for Diet)	飮食須知 饮食须知		Jia Ming	One of the famous works on a balanced and healthy diet which was written in the Yuan dynasty
Yunlin tang yinshi zhidu ji (The Diet Preparation Methods of Yunlintang)	雲林堂飲食制度集 云林堂饮食制度集		Ni Zan, a famous painter	The book recorded the author's homemade recipes, condiments, tea and wine, which reflects the style of Wuxi cuisine.
Jujia biyong shilei quanji (Collection of Necessary Matters Ordered for the Householder)	居家必用事類全集 居家必用事类全集	1301		An encyclopedia that became a precursor to encyclopedias of the late Ming, and has a chapter devoted to "foods of the Muslims" (gengji 庚集, jiji 己集)
Zhuanshi (A History of Cuisine)	饌史 馔史			A compilation of anecdotes about diet extracted from Tang and Song books mentioned above on this page.

== Ming dynasty ==
China during the Ming dynasty (1368–1644) became involved in a new global trade of goods, plants, animals, and food crops known as the Columbian Exchange. Although the bulk of imports to China were silver, the Chinese also purchased New World crops from the Spanish Empire. This included sweet potatoes, maize, and peanuts, foods that could be cultivated in lands where traditional Chinese staple crops—wheat, millet, and rice—couldn't grow, hence facilitating population growth. In the Song dynasty (960–1279), rice had become the major staple crop of the poor; after sweet potatoes were introduced to China around 1560, they gradually became the traditional food of the lower classes.

Title	Chinese name	Date	Author	Description
Yiya yiyi (Yiya's Thoughts Remained)	易牙遗意		Han Yi	More than 150 recipes of condiments, beverages, pastry, dishes, preserved fruits, etc.
Tian chu ju zhenmiao zhuan ji (Heavenly Chefs' Collection of Wonderful Dishes)	天厨聚珍妙馔集			A collection of fine dining recipes
Shenyin or Quxian shenyin shu (Quxian's Reclusive Life)	神隐 or 臞仙神隐书		Zhu Quan	A record of the rustic, hermit-like life of a practitioner of Taoism, including details of farming, the food process and the diet.
Jiuhuang Bencao (Materia Medica for the Relief of Famine)	救荒本草		Zhu Su	The book newly mentions most edible plants.
Shijian bencao (Food Guide for Materia Medica)	食鉴本草	1522～1566	Ning Yuan	A work on dietary therapy, in which 251 items of food and ingredients were recorded, each with its medical attribute.
Bianmin tu zuan (Illustrated Farmer's Guide)	便民图纂		Kuang Fan	An encyclopedia of farmers' daily use. Volume 15 covers food and other topics.
Yecai pu (Wild Vegetable Manual)	野菜谱	1524	Wang Pan	A collection of 60 edible wild herbs, each with an illustration.
Songshi yangsheng bu (Song's Book of Nourishment)	宋氏养生部	1504	Song Xu	It recorded 1010 food items, 1340 recipes and 160 methods of processing and preserving foods.
Yunlin yishi	云林遗事		Gu Yuanqing	A collection of stories about Ni Zan, includes a chapter about his diet.
Shiwu bencao (Food Materia Medica)	食物本草		Wang Ying	Greatly contributed to the development of medical foods.
Shipin ji (Food Collection)	食品集	1537	Wu Lu	It documents 350 types of food, divided into seven sections: cereals, fruits, vegetables, animals, poultry, insects and fish, and water. For each food, it describes its nature and taste, toxicity, advantages and disadvantages of consumption, functions and indications. It also includes cooking methods for the foods.
Guang junpu (Broad Mushroom Manual)	广菌谱		Pan Zhiheng	A documentation of 19 species of edible mushrooms and 4 species of edible non-macrofungi
Bencao gangmu (The Compendium of Materia Medica)	本草纲目	1578–1608	Li Shizhen	А total of 1892 medical substances are addressed in the book, and food items make up a significant portion of them.
Mo'e xiaolu	墨娥小录			Regards various delicacies in food, drink, etc.
Duo neng bi shi	多能鄙事		Liu Ji	The book is divided into eleven sections containing essential knowledge for everyday life. Volumes 1 to 4 deal with food and cuisine.
Rucao bian	茹草编		Zhou Lüjing	A collection of 105 edible wild herbs, each with an illustration
Jujia bibei (Home Essentials)	居家必备			A household encyclopedia, Volume 7 covers brewing, tea making and cooking.
Zunsheng bajian (Eight Letter on Life Cultivation)	遵生八笺		Gao Lian	The "eating and drinking" part recorded more than 3,200 recipes for beverages, foods, dishes, and medicaments.
Yesupin (Classes of Wild Vegetables)	野蔌品		Gao Lian	It includes descriptions of 96 wild-grown edible plants with details on their appearance, character and the way of cooking them.
Haiwei suoyin (Index of Seafood Products)	海味索引		Tu Benjun	A record of 16 aquatic products, to correct errors in earlier such books.
Minzhong haicuoshu	闽中海错疏		Tu Benjun	Records of marine animals along the coast of Fujian.
Yecai jian (Wild Vegetable Paper)	野菜笺		Tu Benjun	Records 22 common edible wild plants in the author's hometown.
Shantang sikao	山堂肆考	1595	Peng Dayi (彭大翼)	A 5-part encyclopedia with 240 volumes, including volumes on food and beverages, cereals, vegetables, and fruits.
Yecai bolu (Extensive Record of Wild Plants)	野菜博录	1622	Bao Shan	Records of 435 edible wild plants.
Shangyi bencao	上医本草	1620	Zhao Nanxing	Records of more than 200 food items that are also used medicinally
Shangzheng (Regiment of the beaker)	觞政		Yuan Hongdao	Drinking games and customs
Nongzheng quanshu (Encyclopedia of Agriculture)	农政全书		Xu Guangqi	Details of agricultural practices with the effects of the climate and landscape
Yangyu yueling	养余月令	1633	Dai Xi	A farmer's encyclopaedia organised by month of the year
Jiushi (Wine History)	酒史		Feng Shihua	Chinese wine knowledge, customs and culture

== Qing dynasty ==
Documents compiled during the Qing dynasty (1644–1912).

Title	Chinese name	Date	Author	Description
Xianqing ouji (Leisure Time)	闲情偶寄		Li Yu	Contains a section on food and drink
Min xiao ji	闽小记	1647	Zhou Lianggong	Narrative of Fukienese folklore, produce and trivia
Yinshi xuzhi (Necessary Dietary Information)	饮食须知		Zhu Benzhong	Dietary do's and don'ts from a medical scientist
Tiaodingji	调鼎集			A cookery book compiled in the mid-Qing dynasty collected the practical experience of cooks.
Shiwu bencao huizuan	食物本草会纂	1691	Shen Lilong	Records of 220 foods that are also used medicinally, listing the nature, taste and function of each.
Jiangnan yuxianpin (Fish species from the Lower Yangtze)	江南鱼鲜品		Chen Jian	The book recorded 21 species of food fish.
Gui'eryue	簋贰约		You Tong	
Riyong suzi	日用俗字		Pu Songling	A literacy textbook based on objects and contents of everyday life, which has a chapter on foods and one on vegetables
Shixian hongmi	食宪鸿秘		Zhu Yizun	Over 400 recipes for condiments, drinks, dishes and pastries.
Fan you shi'er heshuo (Twelve Thoughts on Meals)	饭有十二合说		Zhang Ying	Gains of knowledge and thoughts about meals
Yuanjian leihan (Categorized boxes of the Yuanjian Studio)	渊鉴类函			A large encyclopedia compiled in imperial order, with sections on foods, grains, medicinal herbs, vegetables and fruits.
Juchang yinzhuan lu	居常饮馔录		Cao Yin	A compilation of dietary works from Song and Ming dynastyies
Complete Classics Collection of Ancient China	古今图书集成	1700–1725	Chen Menglei and Jiang Tingxi	The food section is included in the Economy part
Xu chajing (The Sequel to Classic of Tea)	续茶经		Lu Tingcan	A combing and recording of tea production and consumption from the Tang Dynasty to the Qing Dynasty.
Gezhi jingyuan (Mirrored contexts for thorough investigations)	格致镜原		Chen Yuanlong	An encyclopedia of which the volume 6 covers food and drink.
Nongpu bianlan (Overview of agriculture and gardening)	农圃便览	1755	Ding Yizeng	The book provides information on techniques for growing staple foods, legumes, fruits and flowers, as well as forecasting or treating and processing agricultural products, including brewing, cooking and medical treatment.
Xingyuan lu	醒园录		Li Huanan	A culinary book with recipes for dishes, pastries, snacks, brewing methods as well as food preservation methods.
Yangsheng suibi	养生随笔	1773	Cao Tingdong	Health care knowledges for the elderly, the 5th volume is dedicated to congees listing 100 recipes
Suiyuan shidan (Recipes from the Garden of Contentment)	随园食单	1792	Yuan Mei	A work on cooking and gastronomy
Wu xun pu (Wu region mushroom manual)	吴蕈谱	1683	Wu Lin	A documentation of 26 edible mushrooms commonly found around Suzhou, and also listed inedible, poisonous mushrooms of the area
Jihai cuo (Notes on Marine Products)	记海错	1814	Hao Yixing	A book recording common marine animals and plants along the coast of northern China
Zhengsuwen (Recognition of misused Characters)	证俗文		Hao Yixing	A dictionary to rectify Chinese characters often misused in everyday life. The first volume covers names and terms relating to food and drink
Xilüe (On Vinegar)	醯略		Zhao Xin	A collection of texts on vinegar from over 100 ancient Chinese works.
Yangxiaolu (Gourmet's Note)	养小录	1698	Gu Zhong	In 22 categories, the book describes the preparation of 276 drinks, condiments, dishes and pastries.
Yangzhou huafang lu	扬州画舫录	1795	Li Dou	The book describes life in the merchants' quarters of Yangzhou, including its food and teahouses.
Tiaoji yinshi bian (Conditioning the sick body through diet)	调疾饮食辨	1823	Zhang Mu	The book contains the medicinal properties of more than six hundred kinds of foods
Qing jia lu	清嘉录		Gu Lu	The book describes the folk customs, human history and natural scenery of the Suzhou area.
Tongqiao yizhao lu	桐桥倚棹录		Gu Lu	A local journal describing the landscape, scenic spots, temples, monuments, and handicrafts in the area of Huqiu and Shantang in Suzhou.
Suixiju yinshipu	随息居饮食谱	1861	Wang Shixiong	The book includes more than330 food items and provides a detailed discussion of the tastes, characteristics and effects on the body of various drinks and foods, as well as their medical uses from the perspective of traditional Chinese medicine.
Lü Yuan Cong Hua Yinengpian	履园丛话·艺能篇		Qian Yong	There's one chapter titled "Cooking".
Zhongkui lu	中馈录		Peng Songyu	
Huya	湖雅		Wang Yuezhen	A dictionary-like glossary of the rich agricultural and fishery products of Huzhou
Zhongkui lu	中馈录		Zeng Yi	Recorded process for the production of air-dried hams, sausages and other food products, and condiments
Zhoupu (Guang Zhoupu)	粥谱 广粥谱		Huang Yunhu	A book specialising in the preparation of congee
Xinbian jiazhengxue (New Home Economics)	新编家政学			Part 4, chapter 3 is on diet.
Chengdu tonglan	成都通览		Fu Chongju	A book reflecting the whole picture of Chengdu society in the late Qing Dynasty. Volume 7 is on food and drink.

== Post-Qing period ==
Documents compiled after the Qing dynasty.

Title	Chinese name	Date	Author	Description
Zaoyangfan shu Western Cookbook	造洋饭书	1909		The earliest western cookbook in China. It is divided into 25 chapters, which introduce the ingredients and cooking methods of western food.
Shipin jiawei beilan Overview of Food Delicacy	食品佳味备览		He Yun Shi	Listed over 200 famous specialty foods in different parts of China, occasionally involves famous restaurants and the method of preparing dishes.
Qingbai leichao Anthology of Petty Matters in Qing	清稗类钞	1917	Xu Ke	An anthology of historiographical essays from the entire Qing period includes all aspects of history, society, state, the arts and human life.
Pengren yiban Introduction to cooking	烹饪一斑	1935	Lu Shoujian	An introductory cookery book for beginners
Jiating shipu Family recipes	家庭食谱	1916	Li Gong'er	Recipes for family meals and dishes.
Xican pengren mijue Tips for cooking Western food	西餐烹饪秘诀	1921	Li Gong'er	
Jiating shipu xubian Family Recipes Sequel	家庭食谱续编	1924	Shi Xisheng	Recipes for family meals and dishes.
Jiating shipu sanbian Family Recipes Third	家庭食谱三编		Shi Xisheng	A follow-up of the Family Recipes Sequel
Jiating shipu sibian Family Recipes Four	家庭食谱四编		Shi Xisheng	A follow-up of the Family Recipes Third
Sushi pu Vegetarian Manual	素食谱	1925	Shi Xisheng	More than 250 recipes for vegetarian dishes
Jiashi shixi baojian	家事实习宝鉴	1918	Wang Yanlun	A guide to the different categories of household chores, including family meals cooking.
Zhijia quanshu	治家全书	1919	Gao Jianhua	An encyclopedia of women with a section on culinary expertise.
Jiating wanbao quanshu	家庭万宝全书			Includes a section of culinary expertise.
Sushi shenglun	素食养生论		Yamazaki Kesaya	Translated from the original Japanese book. Argues that vegetarianism is good for health.
Shanghai kuailan Shanghai Quick Browse	上海快览	1924	Tao Fengzi	A guide for visitors or new residents of Shanghai, including a chapter introducing the restaurants and diners.
Shiwu xin bencao (New Materia Medica of Food)	食物新本草			Translated from the original Japanese book. Introduces modern Western concepts and knowledge of nutrition and food hygiene
Qinan kuailan Jinan Quick Browse	济南快览	1927	Zhou Chuanming	A guide for visitors or new residents of Jinan, including a chapter introducing the restaurants and diners.
Beiping caipu (Beiping Recipes)	北平菜谱	1931		A collection of recipes of the dishes that were served at the Dalian Liaodong Hotel
Minzhong changshi congshu (People's Common Knowledge)	民众常识丛书		Yue Junshi	Household tips aimed at female readers, including a section on culinary expertise
Jinan daguan Getting to Know Jinan	济南大观	1934	Luo Tengxiao	A guide for visitors to Jinan, including a chapter introducing the restaurants and diners.
Yinshi yu jiankang Diet and health	饮食与健康	1936	Zhang Enting	Introduces the relationship between diet and health from the perspective of modern food chemistry and Western nutrition.
Beiping fengsu leizheng	北平风俗类征	1937	Li Jiarui	Detailed and systematic collection of Beijing folk customs, including eating habits.
Feishi shiyang sanzhong	费氏食养三种	1938	Fei Zibin Fei Boxiong	Three books on dietary therapy.
Shiyong yinshixue Practical Dietetics	实用饮食学	1939	Gong Lanzhen Zhou Xuan	A textbook on healthy eating and nutrition.
Xin shipu Latest Recipe	新食谱	1941	Ren Bangzhe Lin Guogao	Nutritional components in the foods of the daily diet.
Sushi shuolü	素食说略		Xue Baochen	The recipes of more than 170 kinds of vegetarian dishes popular in the late Qing Dynasty.
Chifan wenti Questions to Eating	吃饭问题	1944	Shan Yingmin	Popular knowledge books on diet and nutrition.
Yuanshan Shipu	媛珊食譜	1954	Huang Yuanshan	First Chinese cookbooks to achieve commercial success in postwar Taiwan

== See also ==
- List of medieval cookbooks
