= Ying Wang =

Ying Wang or Yingwang may refer to:

- Wang Ying (disambiguation), Chinese people with the surname Wang and given name Ying
- Prince of Ying (disambiguation) or Ying Wang, royalty or generals from Chinese history carrying this title
- King Eagle, a 1971 Hong Kong film by Chang Cheh
- Yingwang Subdistrict (英旺乡), a subdistrict in Yichuan County, Shaanxi, China
