= Li Hui (Northern Qi) =

Official of the Northern Qi dynasty in China

- Chinese: 李繪
Transcriptions
Standard Mandarin
- Hanyu Pinyin: Lǐ Huì
- Wade–Giles: Li3 Kuei4

Jingwen
- Chinese: 敬文
Transcriptions
Standard Mandarin
- Hanyu Pinyin: Jìngwén

Li Hui, courtesy name Jingwen, posthumous name Jing (景), was an official of the Chinese Northern Qi dynasty.

== History ==
Li was to attend school at the age of six but due to local customs, he was not allowed to attend school. However, he stole his sister's text books and finished the Jijiupian (《急就章》) in a few days.

Li grew up to be handsome and well built. His uncle, Xing Yan, commented that his conversation with Li, is enlightening and precious, and Li's family's hope is all on him.

Later, Emperor edict written five rites, Wang Wu and Li Hui cells together responsible for writing the salute. In the Temple of Xianyang(顯陽殿), Emperor Xiaojing of Eastern Wei explained the "Book of Filial Piety"(《孝經》) and the "Book of Rites"(《禮記》). Li Hui and his cousin Li Qian, Pei Bomao, Wei Shou, Lu Yuanming and other officials were responsible for the record, and his records were brief and to the point. He served as the assistant minister, Prime Minister Sima. When the Imperial Court played on the emperor, Li Hui was the first to speak to the emperor. His voice sounds words, graceful demeanor, the listener must respect, Emperor Wen Xiang was more respectable to him, and later he was in charge of the etiquette system.

In the early years of Wuding(武定), he also served as the general manager of the Liang. Emperor Wu of Liang asked him where Gao Huan was now. What is Yuwen Tai like? What's the plan for Gao Huan? Li Hui replies clear, Emperor Wu of Liang is very satisfied. He and Liang talked about the clan's problem, and Yuan Xia said, "it's not as if I was one of Huang Di's fourteen descendants after Huang Di." Li Hui said ": the ancestor of the old man's ancestry is long, should have a word with the Che Qianqiu!" Raise a laugh.All the people who made it back and forth took the goods to ask for a trade, li painted himself high, and Liang respected his honesty.

To come back, thanks to his official Gaoyang(高陽) neishi. There were three raptors in the county, often endangering the people, and Li Hui was preparing to build a fence to hold them, and they died in the county west because of the fight. The men all thought this was the result of this, and persuaded him to play the emperor. Li Hui said, "the beast dies by fighting each other. By accident, it is his own credit, and others will look down on me." No promise, there are many lakes and ponds in the past Gao Yang, after the arrival of Li Hui, the lake dried up. So he set up in charge of agricultural officials responsible for encouraging the kind of work to farming, reclaimed land increased several times than in the past, every life rich, everyone have plenty of food and clothing. The people of the three counties of Yingzhou(瀛洲) came to the state and asked for Li Hui's monument on the county street.Emperor Shenwu visited the counties in the east, and in Yingzhou city west stopped the horse for a long time, sent the Langzhong Chen yuankang to inform and console him.

Hejian(河間) Prefecture Cui Chen, relying on his brother Cui Xian, asked Li Hui for antlers and dove feather. Li Hui wrote replied: "dove has six wings, can fly straight to the sky; the elk have four legs, can run up until the sea. That flabby skin, body weakness, clumsiness, nearly cannot hunt birds and beasts, and the villain is far from a." At that time to make emperor sends Cui Xian selection Situ Zuozhangshi, Cui Xian recommended Li Hui, but there was no reply, later all think that because of this letter.

After Emperor Wen Xiang duct acceded to the throne, replaced the counties in Shandong (山東) officials generally, specialized books was called into the officials, only Li Hui and Qinghe (清河) satrap Xing Shu symplectic two people. In the course of the dynasty, the general has been promoted to the position of the general, and promoted to a Sima. The Emperor Wen Xiang gave the former master of the hall to Li Hui, "you can only help me with your whole heart, and I will use you as a minister in the future. Don't imitate the Hou Jing rebellion." Later, Li Hui is still a propaganda heir, was appointed Prime Minister Sima. In the early years of Tianbao (天保), named Situ Youzhangshi. Li Hui behaved sober, never flatter those in power of the people, so long not to upgrade. After his death, awarded the provincial governor of Qingzhou (青州), Posthumous name "Jing"(景).

== Family ==
- Great grandfather:Li Ling(李靈)
  - Father:Li Zun(李遵)
    - Brother:Li Hun(李渾)
      - Nephew:Li Zhan(李湛)
    - Cousin:Li Ji(李籍)
      - Nephew:Li Gongxu(李公緒)

=== Children ===
Son:Li Jundao(李君道)

== Bibliography ==
"Book of Northern Qi(《北齊書》)" Volume 29/Biographies 21
