= 雲州 =

雲州 may refer to:

- Izumo Province, abbreviated name was following Unshū (雲州), province of Japan located in what is today the eastern part of Shimane Prefecture
- Yun Prefecture (雲州), a prefecture between the 7th and 11th centuries in modern Datong, Shanxi, China
