= Sixteen Prefectures =

Historical region in North China

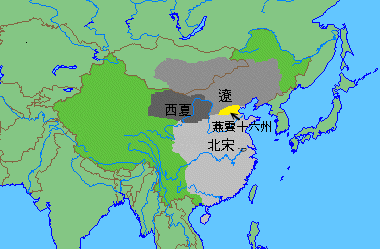
The Sixteen Prefectures (yellow) wedged between Liao (gray) in the north and Northern Song (light gray) in the south. Some distance to its west is Western Xia (deep gray)

The Sixteen Prefectures, more precisely known as the Sixteen Prefectures of Yan–Yun (traditional Chinese: 燕雲十六州; simplified Chinese: 燕云十六州; pinyin: Yān Yún Shíliù Zhōu) or the Sixteen Prefectures of You–Ji (Chinese: 幽薊十六州; pinyin: Yōu Jì Shíliù Zhōu), were a historical region in North China that comprises present-day municipalities of Beijing, Tianjin and parts of northern Hebei and Shanxi provinces north of the Hai River and its two northern tributaries Sanggan and Juma rivers. The region's name came from the sixteen military district prefectures (zhou) of the Tang dynasty's northeastern borderlands under the fanzhen administration of the Youzhou and Hedong jiedushi, whose administrative seats were in Yan Prefecture and Yun Prefecture, respectively.

Situated south the Great Wall within the Yan Mountains and Heng Mountain, the Sixteen Prefectures were a strategically important gateway region into the Central Plains and shielded the North China Plain from Hu incursions from the northeast, north and northwest, reinforced by riverine logistic transport of the Grand Canal.

During the Five Dynasties and Ten Kingdoms period, the region was ceded to the Khitan-led Liao dynasty in 938 AD by Shi Jingtang, who desperately sought Liao aid in his rebellion against his brother-in-law, the Later Tang emperor Li Congke. This cession subsequently caused various Central Plains dynasties to the region's south (including the Shatuo-led Later Jin dynasty founded by Shi Jingtang himself) to become vulnerable against invaders from the north (who used the region as a strategic staging area), as there were no longer any significant natural barriers north of the Yellow River capable of halting large-scale cavalry incursions. The region was marred by constant military conflicts for the next three centuries, both by the Central Plains regimes (such as the Later Zhou and the Northern Song dynasties) attempting to recapture the region and by new northern invaders (such as the Jurchen-led Jin dynasty and later the Mongol-led Yuan dynasty) against the old occupiers (the Liao and Jin dynasties, respectively), until the Mongol Empire conquered northern China in 1234 AD. After the Yuan dynasty, the region came under the control of the subsequent Ming and Qing dynasties.

== Overview ==
After the Tang dynasty collapsed, the Sixteen Prefectures became a site of contention between various ethnicities of North China, including Han, Khitan, Jurchen, and Mongol.

In 938 AD, the prefectures were ceded to the Khitans by Shi Jingtang of the Shatuo-led Later Jin, who submitted to Khitan emperor Yelü Deguang as the latter's "son-emperor" (despite the latter being almost 11 years younger) in exchange of military support in his rebellion against his estranged brother-in-law, Emperor Li Conghou of Later Tang. While Shi succeeded in overthrowing Later Tang, his shameless treason not only fully exposed North China to Khitan invasions and looting, but also doomed his own regime, which were invaded and destroyed by the Khitans nine years later when Yelü Deguang's Liao dynasty defeated and exiled Shi's successor and nephew Shi Chonggui in 947 AD. The Khitan's victory were however short-lived when Yelü Deguang grew tired of constant Chinese insurgencies and decided to withdraw but died of illness on his way back, and the territories newly conquered by the Khitans were quickly recovered by the Later Han. After the Later Han was overthrown by the Later Zhou, Zhou second emperor Chai Rong attempted to recapture the Sixteen Prefectures with a northern expedition in 959 AD, nearly succeeding until the campaign had to be abandoned due to Chai suddenly falling ill and died within a month.

After Later Zhou general Zhao Kuangyin usurped the throne from Chai Rong's 7-year-old son Chai Zongxun with a mutiny at Chenqiao and established the Song dynasty in 960 AD, he chose to deal with other rival states in the south and west first instead of recovering the Sixteen Prefectures, despite that the Liao dynasty had already the been weakened by a decade of internal conflicts and political chaos. However, when his brother and successor Zhao Guangyi finally decided to launch northern expeditions to recapture the Sixteen Prefectures in 979 AD, the Liao dynasty had recovered its strength and decisively defeated the Song dynasty twice in 979 AD and 986 AD. After the failure of a Liao invasion in 1003 AD, the Chanyuan Treaty was signed in 1005 AD, which practically eliminated any possibilities for the Song dynasty to recapture the Sixteen Prefectures from the Khitans.

In 1120s, two principal cities, Youzhou (also called Yanzhou, modern Beijing) and Yunzhou (modern Datong, Shanxi) were taken away from the Liao when the Jurchen-led Jin dynasty conquered the region. In 1123, the Jin ceded most of the territories except Yunzhou to the Song, but retook them in an invasion of Song territory in 1125. The Song dynasty then collapsed two years later in the Jingkang incident in 1127, and the surviving royal court fled south of the Huai River to establish a rump state known as the Southern Song dynasty.

The loss of the Sixteen Prefectures again exposed the plains of Central China to northern threats when the Mongol Empire rose in the 13th century. The Mongols, under Ögedei Khan, would conquer the Jin dynasty in 1232, completing the conquest of all of northern China. The Southern Song dynasty would be conquered by Kublai Khan's Yuan dynasty in 1279.

In 1368, Hongwu Emperor of the Ming dynasty ordered general Xu Da and Chang Yuchun to call for the restoration of Han rule. They sent a Northern Expedition to Zhongyuan, overthrowing the Yuan's rule in China proper and establishing Ming. The Sixteen Prefectures were then restored to Han rule.

== Tang dynasty political geography ==
The Sixteen Prefectures were administrative units established during the Tang dynasty. Under the Tang, each prefecture or zhou was a unit of administration larger than a county but smaller than a province. The Sixteen Prefectures stretched from Ji County in modern-day Tianjin Municipality to Shuozhou in Shanxi Province, extending contiguously along the mountains that divide the agrarian plains of central China from the pastoralist steppes to the north. Several dynasties including the Qin and the Northern Dynasties before the Tang built the Great Wall along these mountains. Seven of the Sixteen Prefectures were located inside (south) of the Inner Great Wall. The other eleven were located in between the Inner and Outer Great Walls. The Tang did not build Great Walls but used frontier military commanders to guard against the northern tribes. The Fanyang or Youzhou-Jizhou Commandery, based in modern-day Beijing commanded 11 of the Sixteen Prefectures. The other seven were commanded by the Hedong Commandery based in Yunzhou, modern Datong.

| | Prefecture | Chinese characters | Modern location | Modern province/ municipality | Administrator during the Tang | Proximity to the Great Wall |
|---|---|---|---|---|---|---|
| 1 | Youzhou (Yanzhou) | 幽州 (燕州) | Xicheng District | Beijing | Youzhou-Jizhou | inside |
| 2 | Shunzhou | 順州 | Shunyi District | Beijing | Youzhou-Jizhou | inside |
| 3 | Tanzhou | 檀州 | Miyun District | Beijing | Youzhou-Jizhou | inside |
| 4 | Ruzhou | 儒州 | Yanqing District | Beijing | Youzhou-Jizhou | in between |
| 5 | Jizhou | 薊州 | Jizhou District, Tianjin | Tianjin | Youzhou-Jizhou | inside |
| 6 | Yingzhou | 瀛州 | Hejian | Hebei | Youzhou-Jizhou | inside |
| 7 | Mozhou | 莫州 | Renqiu | Hebei | Youzhou-Jizhou | inside |
| 8 | Zhuozhou | 涿州 | Zhuozhou | Hebei | Youzhou-Jizhou | inside |
| 9 | Xinzhou | 新州 | Zhuolu | Hebei | Youzhou-Jizhou | in between |
| 10 | Guizhou | 嬀州 | Huailai | Hebei | Youzhou-Jizhou | in between |
| 11 | Wuzhou | 武州 | Xuanhua | Hebei | Youzhou-Jizhou | in between |
| 12 | Yuzhou | 蔚州 | Yu County | Hebei | Hedong | in between |
| 13 | Yunzhou | 雲州 | Datong | Shanxi | Hedong | in between |
| 14 | Yīngzhou | 應州 | Ying County | Shanxi | Hedong | in between |
| 15 | Huanzhou | 寰州 | East of Shuozhou | Shanxi | Hedong | in between |
| 16 | Shuozhou | 朔州 | Shuozhou | Shanxi | Hedong | in between |

The historian Frederick W. Mote writes that there were actually 19 prefectures but does not specify them. Chinese historians do not consider Yingzhou (營州; modern Qian'an, Hebei) and Pingzhou (平州; modern Lulong, Hebei) to be part of the Sixteen Prefectures because they had already been occupied by the Liao dynasty during the Later Tang, prior to Shi Jingtang’s cession. Yizhou (易州; modern Yi County, Hebei), which fell to the Liao after the cession, is also excluded from the count of 16. The Liao created two new prefectures, Jingzhou (景州; modern Zunhua, Hebei) from Jizhou and Luanzhou (灤州; Luan County, Hebei) from Pingzhou, which have not been included in the original 16.

== Five Dynasties and Ten Kingdoms period ==
The year 907 and subsequent collapse of the Tang dynasty was a turning point in East Asian history. On that year the pastoral and nomadic people known as the Khitan crowned Yelü Abaoji (Emperor Taizu of Liao) as their new Great Khan, the first from the Yelü tribe after some two centuries of leadership by the Yaonian clan. Abaoji coveted the plains of North China, a rich source of plunder that was guarded by a line of passes and fortifications stretching from mountainous northern Shanxi to the Bo Sea. In 905 Abaoji had already started to intervene in northern China by leading a massive army to Datong in Shanxi to swear brotherhood with Li Keyong who nominally served the severely weakened Tang dynasty as Jiedushi of Shanxi on the westernmost point of the defense line.

The rise of Khitan power under Abaoji occurred just as the Central Plains were falling into turmoil. The fall of the Tang dynasty in 907 led to power struggles among rival warlords and to the creation of a number of short-lived polities known as the Five Dynasties. The first of these dynasties was founded by Zhu Wen, another Jiedushi, who declared himself emperor of the Later Liang in 907 after deposing the last Tang emperor. In 923 his dynasty was overthrown by Li Keyong's son, Li Cunxu, who then proclaimed the Later Tang.

The Sixteen Prefectures passed into Liao hands in 938, when the Liao dynasty supported Shi Jingtang, another military governor of Shanxi, in his revolt against the Later Tang. Confident in his own military strength, the Liao emperor, Abaoji's second son Yelü Deguang (Emperor Taizong of Liao), convinced Shi to found a new dynasty (the Later Jin), but also to cede a large band of territory to the Liao that represented the entire northern China defense line. The Liao dynasty now possessed all the passes and fortifications that controlled access to the northern China plains.

== Liao rule ==
The Khitan-led Liao dynasty kept using Chinese administrative forms to administer the counties and prefectures they had captured. They named Datong (on the western end of the Sixteen Prefectures) their Western Capital, and in 938 built a new fortified city at Youzhou (near modern-day Beijing), which they turned into their Southern Capital. Under Liao rule, the Sixteen Prefectures thus represented two of the Liao dynasty's five divisions. Both sections were part of the Southern Chancellery, one of two broader divisions the Liao dynasty had been divided into. The Sixteen Prefectures had become the springboard from which the Liao dynasty would exert its influence on northern China.

Shi Jingtang, the Later Jin emperor who had ceded the Sixteen Prefectures to the Liao dynasty in 937, died in 942. He had been a staunch ally (some describe him as a puppet ruler) of the Khitan, but his successor Shi Chonggui refused to recognize the Emperor Taizong of Liao as his superior. After a year of tense diplomatic exchanges, in 943 the Liao dynasty finally resolved to punish Shi for his insubordination. For two years the engagements were indecisive, until in 945, the Emperor Taizong of Liao, who was leading his troops in battle, was almost killed in a rout of his forces in southern Hebei; he had to flee the battlefield on a camel. The following year, however, the Liao emperor launched a new campaign from his Southern Capital (within the Sixteen prefectures), triggering the collapse of the Later Jin. Having seized the Later Jin capital of Kaifeng in early 947, later that year he declared the name of his dynasty as "Great Liao" (大遼) and proclaimed himself emperor. The Emperor Taizong of Liao quickly became disillusioned with governing so many sedentary people who resented Liao rule, and decided to retreat back to his Southern Capital. Heavy resistance on the retreat route and Taizong's death in 947 provoked a succession crisis in the Liao government, and an opportunity for a new dynasty in northern China.

Still, the territory remained in Liao hands. However, by 960, the Song dynasty had ended the turmoil that northern China had endured since 907, and by 979, they had essentially unified southern China, but lost the Sixteen Prefectures.

== Liao-Song contention ==
The Liao and Song were actually developing reasonably amicable relations in the 960s into the mid-970s, during the reign of the Emperor Taizu of Song. The Song dynasty was still focusing on trying to reunify southern China. However, despite the exchange of embassies in 974 and the growth of profitable trade between the two, there were still two fatal flaws to the relationship. One concerned continued support for the Northern Han. The other was the Song dynasty's refusal to accept continued Liao possession of the Sixteen Prefectures.

When the Song were successful in finally incorporating the Northern Han in 979, the Song decided to launch an offensive against the Liao in the Sixteen Prefectures. Emperor Taizong of Song led his weary and ill-supplied troops toward the Liao Southern Capital (present-day Beijing). The Liao boundary was reached in May and they initially encountered little resistance. By July 20, they had attacked the Southern Capital. Ten days later, the first contingent of Liao cavalry arrived. The ensuing Battle of Gaoliang River on August 1 near the Southern Capital resulted in a complete rout of Song forces, who had to retreat back to Kaifeng. The Sixteen Prefectures would remain in Liao hands.

After Emperor Jingzong of Liao died, Empress Dowager Chengtian took power at age 30 in 982, serving as a regent for her 11-year-old son Emperor Shengzong of Liao and led military campaigns along with her son until her death. The Song dynasty once again tried to attack in 986, to take advantage of Shengzong's youth. They sent forces against the territory on three fronts, but the Liao scored decisive victories over all three Song forces. Empress Dowager Chengtian personally led the Liao army in campaigns against the Song during their invasion of Liao in 986 and defeated them in battle, fighting the retreating Chinese army. She then ordered the castration of around 100 ethnic Chinese boys she had captured in China, supplementing the Khitan's supply of eunuchs to serve at her court, among them was Wang Ji'en. The boys were all under ten years old and were selected for their good looks. The History of Liao (遼史) described and praised Empress Chengtian's capture and mass castration of Chinese boys in a biography on the eunuch Wang Ji'en. The fifteen-year-old Emperor Shengzong led the Liao's decisive victory at the Battle of Qigou Pass.

Ethnic Han elites held a prominent position in the Liao state alongside Khitan elites. One of them was a lineage with the surname Hán (韓). The Khitan had abducted the Hán clan from Jizhou and despite being ethnic Han, they were thoroughly Kitanized culturally and linguistically and served the Liao loyally in military and political positions along with several other ethnic Han elite families who were Kitanized. The loyalty of the Han population of the Liao to the Liao rulers frustrated the Song dynasty ruled by ethnic Han. Khitan women from the imperial consort clan were given to the men of the Hán family for marriage. One member of this lineage was Han Derang (韓德讓), who was close to the Liao imperial family and whose paternal ancestors served the Liao dynasty from the time of Abaoji's reign. Han Derang was the ethnic Han minister who had a love affair with the Empress Dowager Chengtian, who allegedly had a son with him.

Through the 990s, relations between the Song and Liao steadily worsened. Beginning in 999, the Liao would use the Sixteen Prefectures as the launching pad for repeated but indecisive attacks on the Song. Then, in 1004, the Emperor Shengzong of Liao launched another major campaign against the Song. The Chanyuan Treaty signed in early 1005 resulted in annual tribute paid to the Liao dynasty by the Song dynasty.

This treaty was the guide by which relations between the two dynasties would progress until the fall of the Liao dynasty. The Sixteen Prefectures would remain in their possession until that time.

== Jin-Song contention ==
When the Song dynasty reclaimed the Sixteen Prefectures, they were "fiercely resisted" by the Han population there who had previously been under Liao rule, while when the Jin dynasty invaded that area, the Han population did not oppose them at all and handed over the Southern Capital (present-day Beijing, then known as Yanjing) to them. The Jin dynasty were supported by the anti-Song, Beijing-based noble Han clans. Ethnic Han who worked for the Liao were viewed as hostile enemies by the Song dynasty. Ethnic Han from the Song dynasty also defected to the Jin.

== In popular culture ==
The original Chinese name of the 2024 historical fantasy video game Where Winds Meet, "Sixteen Sounds of Yan-Yun" (Chinese: 燕云十六声), is a reference to the Sixteen Prefectures.

== See also ==
- History of Beijing
- Jin–Song wars

== Bibliography ==
- Bauer, Susan Wise (2010). The History of the Medieval World: From the Conversion of Constantine to the First Crusade (illustrated ed.). W. W. Norton & Company. ISBN 978-0393078176.
- Keay, John (2010). China: A History. HarperCollins UK. ISBN 978-0007372089.
- McMahon, Keith (2013). Women Shall Not Rule: Imperial Wives and Concubines in China from Han to Liao. Rowman & Littlefield Publishers. ISBN 978-1442222908.
- Mote, Frederick W. (1999), Imperial China: 900-1800, Cambridge, MA: Harvard University Press, ISBN 0-674-01212-7
- Smith, Paul Jakov (2009), "Introduction: The Sung Dynasty and its Precursors, 907–1279", in Denis C. Twitchett and Paul Jakov Smith (ed.), Cambridge History of China, Vol. 5, Part One: The Sung Dynasty and its Precursors, 907–1279, Cambridge: Cambridge University Press, pp. 1–37, ISBN 978-0-521-81248-1.
- Peterson, Barbara Bennett, ed. (2000). Notable Women of China: Shang Dynasty to the Early Twentieth Century (illustrated ed.). M.E. Sharpe. ISBN 0765619296.
- Standen, Naomi (2009), "The Five Dynasties", in Denis C. Twitchett and Paul Jakov Smith (ed.), Cambridge History of China, Vol. 5, Part One: The Sung Dynasty and its Precursors, 907–1279, Cambridge: Cambridge University Press, pp. 38–132, ISBN 978-0-521-81248-1.
- Tuotuo. Liaoshi [History of Liao]. Beijing: Zhonghua shuju, 1974 (or Tuotuo, Liaoshi (Beijing: Zhonghua shuju, 1974))
- Toqto'a; et al. (1344). Liao Shi (宋史) [History of Liao] (in Chinese).
- Van Derven, H. J., ed. (2000). Warfare in Chinese History. Vol. 47 of Sinica Leidensia / Sinica Leidensia (illustrated ed.). BRILL. ISBN 9004117741.
- Wang, Yuan-Kang (2013). Harmony and War: Confucian Culture and Chinese Power Politics (illustrated ed.). Columbia University Press. ISBN 978-0231522403.
