= Ying Huo =

Ying Huo, Yinghuo, or Ying-huo may refer to:

- Yinghuo-1, a failed 2011 Chinese Mars spaceprobe
- "Yinghuo", the ending theme for Legend of the Phoenix
- Yinghuo, the classical planet Mars in Chinese astronomy
- Ying Huo, a character in Xuan-Yuan Sword: Scar of Sky

== See also ==
- Firefly
- Huo
- Huo Ying (disambiguation)
- Ying (disambiguation)
