= Huoying =

Huoying, Huo-ying, or Huo Ying, may refer to:

- Huoying Subdistrict, a township-level division of Beijing
- Huo Ying, politician for Guizhou at the 11th National People's Congress
- Huo-Ying Jian-Cha-Zhe, a UAV from GYBC UAV

== Transport ==
- Huoying station, a Beijing Subway station
- Huoyingdong station, a Beijing Subway station under construction

== See also ==
- Huo
- Li Huo-Ying, a character in Borrow Your Love
- Ying (disambiguation)
- Ying Huo (disambiguation)
