= Huili (disambiguation) =

Huili or Hui Li may refer to:

- Huili City in Sichuan Province, China
- Huili (monk), Indian Buddhist monk in China
- Warrior (shoes) (Chinese name Huili), a Chinese shoes brand
- Hui Li (electrical engineer), Chinese-American electrical engineer

== See also ==
- Li Hui (disambiguation)
