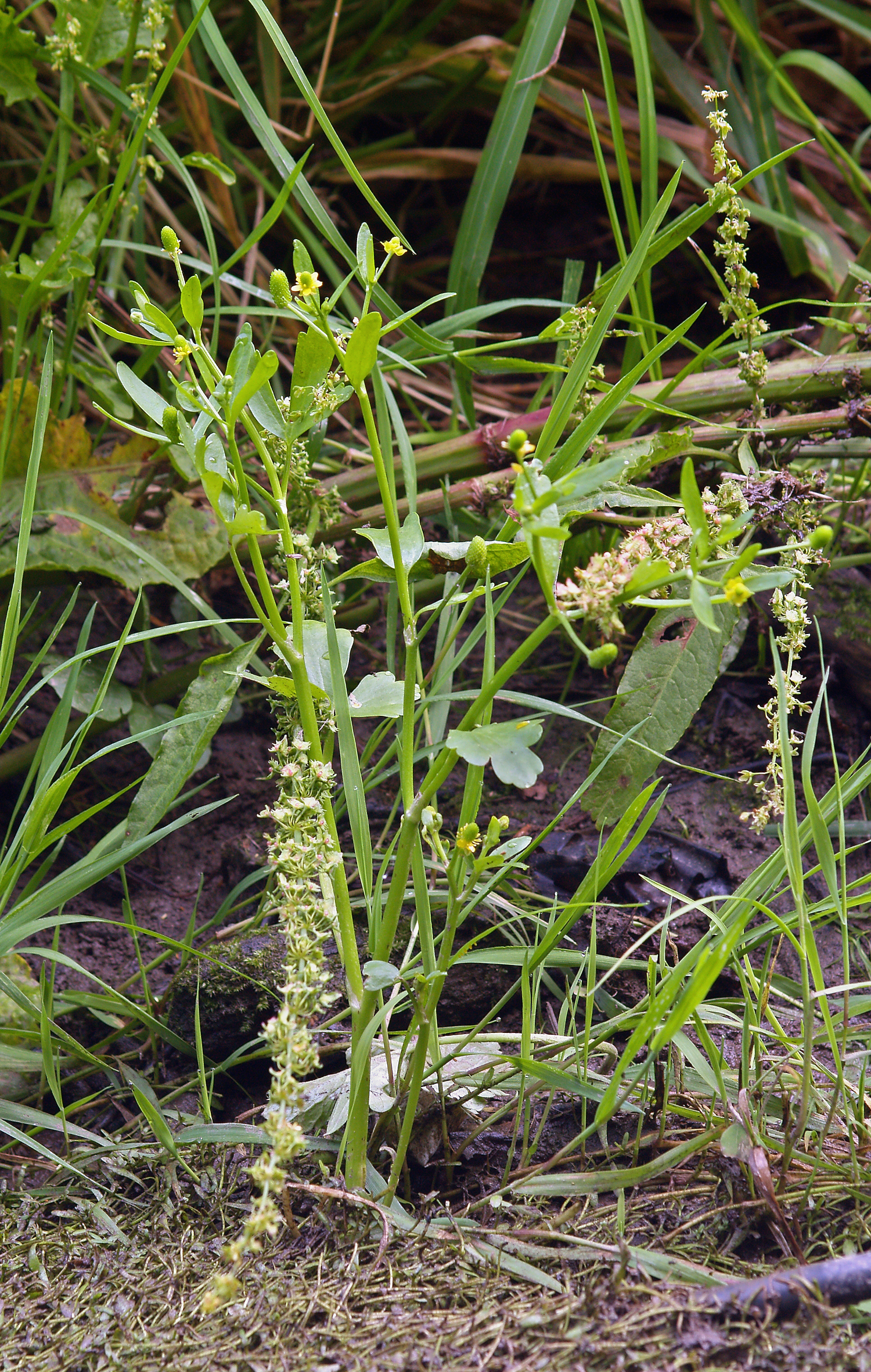

Conservation status
- Least Concern (IUCN 3.1)

Scientific classification
- Kingdom: Plantae
- Clade: Embryophytes
- Clade: Tracheophytes
- Clade: Spermatophytes
- Clade: Angiosperms
- Clade: Eudicots
- Order: Ranunculales
- Family: Ranunculaceae
- Genus: Ranunculus
- Species: R. sceleratus

Binomial name
- Ranunculus sceleratus L.

= Ranunculus sceleratus =

Species of buttercup

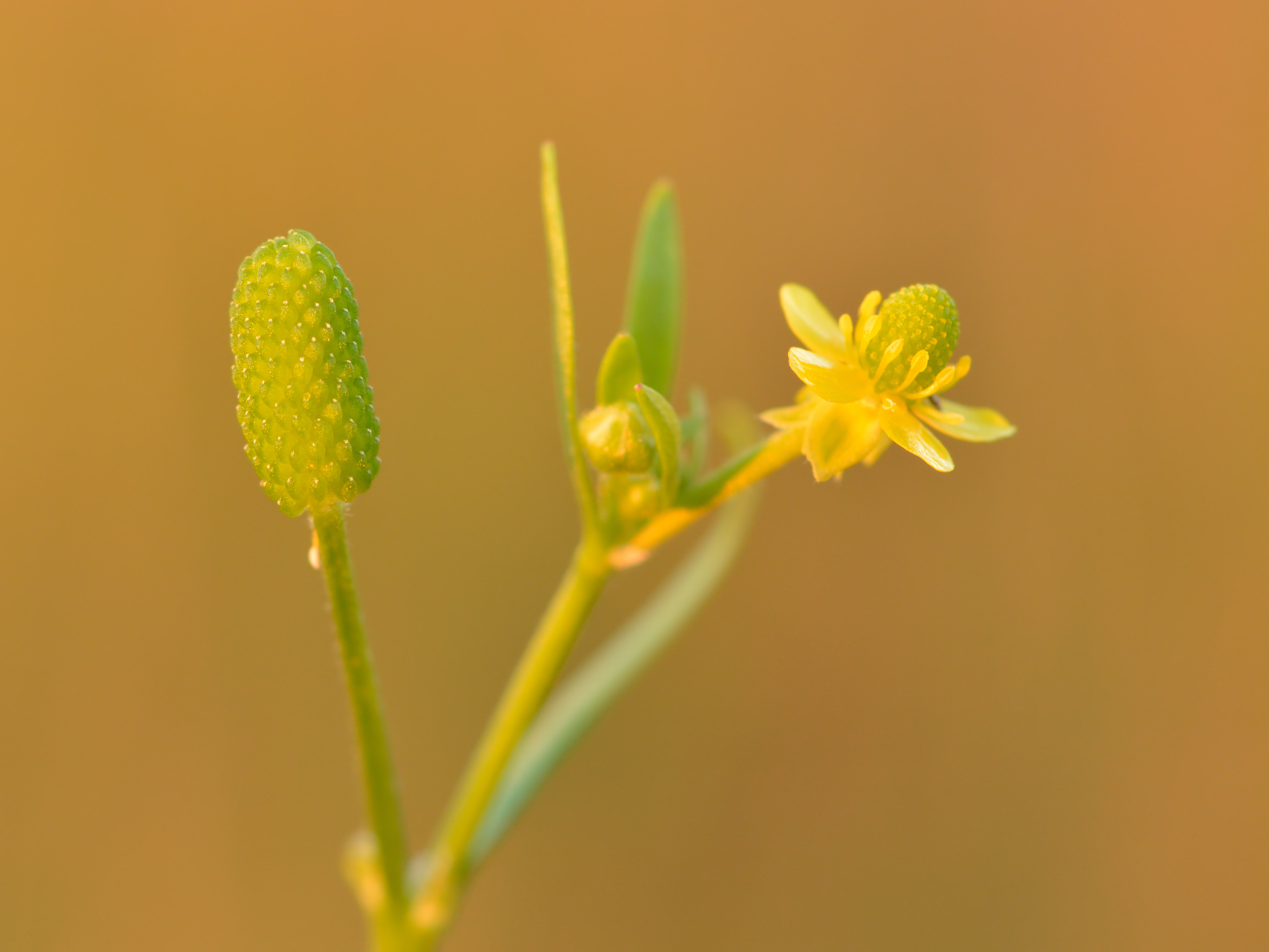
Flowers

Ranunculus sceleratus known by the common names celery-leaved buttercup, celery-leaf buttercup, and cursed buttercup is a species of flowering plant in the buttercup family Ranunculaceae. It has a circumpolar distribution in the northern hemisphere, native to temperate and boreal North America and Eurasia, where it grows in wet and moist habitats, including ponds and streambanks.

== Description ==
Ranunculus sceleratus (石龍芮) diagram in Gujin Tushu Jicheng encyclopedia by Chen Menglei

Ranunculus sceleratus is an annual herb growing up to half a meter tall. The leaves are more or less glabrous (hairless) and have small blades each deeply lobed or divided into three leaflets. They are borne on long petioles. The flowers are 5-10mm across with five or fewer yellow petals a few millimeters long and reflexed sepals. The fruit is an achene borne in a cluster of several.

While buttercups are toxic due to the presence of the substance protoanemonin, this applies in particular for the cursed buttercup: it is the most toxic buttercup and contains 2.5% protoanemonin. When the leaves are wrinkled, damaged or crushed, they bring out unsightly sores and blisters on human skin. All parts of the plant are considered to be poisonous. Side effects after ingestion can manifest themselves as extremely irritating to the skin and mucous membranes. It may cause sensation of pain and burning perceptions, tongue inflammation, and intensification in salivation.

== Distribution ==
Ranunculus sceleratus has a circumpolar distribution in the northern hemisphere There are two varieties and one subspecies with distinctive distributions: R. sceleratus ssp. reptabundus occurs in northern Finland and north-west Russia. R. scleratus var. multifidus occurs in north western North America, and R. scleratus var. longissimus is found from Minnesota to Alabama according to their biodiversity and plant atlases respectively. It is also distributed in Australia and New Zealand.
