= Chinese ophthalmology =

Branch of traditional Chinese medicine

Chinese ophthalmology (Chinese: 中医眼科学; pinyin: zhōngyī yǎnkē xué) is part of Traditional Chinese medicine (TCM). Diseases of the eyes are treated with Chinese herbs, acupuncture/moxibustion, tuina, Chinese dietary therapy as well as qigong and taijiquan.

Inscriptions on oracle bones and tortoise shells from the Shang and Yin dynasties (16th century to 1066 BCE) already contain indications of eye diseases and of their treatment in China.

The work Essential Subtleties on the Silver Sea (银海精微, yínhǎi jīngwēi) has had wide influence on the Chinese ophthalmology until today. It was likely written by Sun Simiao and published at the end of the Yuan Dynasty (1271−1368).

A notable aspect of Chinese ophthalmology is the "five wheels" (五轮, wǔlún) and "eight boundaries" (八廓, bākuò). They characterise certain anatomical segments of the eyes and correspond to certain zang-fu organs. From changes of the five wheels and eight boundaries, diseases and the necessary therapy may be deduced.

In modern Chinese ophthalmology, in China as well as in Western countries, diagnostic methods of Western medicine (such as the slit lamp) are combined with the diagnostic methods of Chinese medicine (such as pulse diagnosis and tongue diagnosis). Then, a disease pattern is stated based on the theories of Chinese medicine.

Amongst others, the acupuncture points BL-1 (jingming 睛明, "Bright Eyes") and ST-1 (chengqi 承泣, "Container of Tears") are said to have a special relationship to eye diseases. Chinese herbs such as Chrysanthemi flos (菊花, júhuā) have a special relationship with the eyes.

Throughout history, a number of qigong exercises for the better nourishing of the eyes have developed. They are said to prevent defective vision such as shortsightedness and are recommended in cases of eye fatigue (so-called "eye qigong"). These exercises are regularly practised in Chinese schools.

In TCM, eye qigong and tuina are considered to be important additional therapies for consolidation of the therapy results following acupuncture in shortsightedness.
