= Ying Zhou =

Ying Zhou may refer to:

- Yingzhou (disambiguation) — a list of geographical locations
- Zhou Ying (disambiguation) — a list of people surnamed Zhou
- Ying Zhou (cricketer) - international cricketer from China
- Ying Zhou (professor) - Director of the Future of Work Research Centre at the University of Surrey
