= Beishicao Township =

Beishicao Township 北石槽乡
- Rural Township
- Běishícáo Xiāng
- Location in Hebei Location in China
- Coordinates: 38°35′41″N 116°14′01″E
- Country: People's Republic of China
- Province: Hebei
- Prefecture-level city: Cangzhou
- County-level city: Hejian

Area
  - Total: 42.43 km^{2} (16.38 sq mi)

Population (2010)
  - Total: 22,294
  - Density: 525.4/km^{2} (1,361/sq mi)
- Time zone: UTC+8 (China Standard)

Beishicao Township (Chinese: 北石槽乡; pinyin: Běishícáo Xiāng) is a rural township located in Hejian, Cangzhou, Hebei, China. According to the 2010 census, Beishicao Township had a population of 22,294, including 11,473 males and 10,821 females. The population was distributed as follows: 4,096 people aged under 14, 15,954 people aged between 15 and 64, and 2,244 people aged over 65.

== See also ==
- List of township-level divisions of Hebei
