= Wang Ying =

Wang Ying may refer to:

- Wang Ying (Tang dynasty) (died 877), rebel to the Tang Dynasty
- Wang Ying (Water Margin), fictional character in the Water Margin
- Wang Ying (Ming dynasty), author of Shiwu bencao Food Materia Medica, see List of sources of Chinese culinary history
- Wang Ying (ROC) (1895–1951), Chinese military commander and Japanese puppet warlord
- Wang Ying (actress) (1913–1974), Chinese actress
- Wayne Wang (born 1949), Chinese American film director
- Wang Ying (actor) (born 1957), Chinese male actor
- Wang Ying (softball) (born 1968), Chinese softball player
- Wang Ying (composer) (born 1976), Chinese composer
- Wang Ying (ice hockey) (born 1981), Chinese ice hockey player
- Wang Ying (wrestler) (born 1983), Chinese wrestler
- Wang Ying (water polo) (born 1988), Chinese water polo player
- Wang Ying (footballer) (born 1997), Chinese soccer player
