= Yu Sheng =

Chinese painter

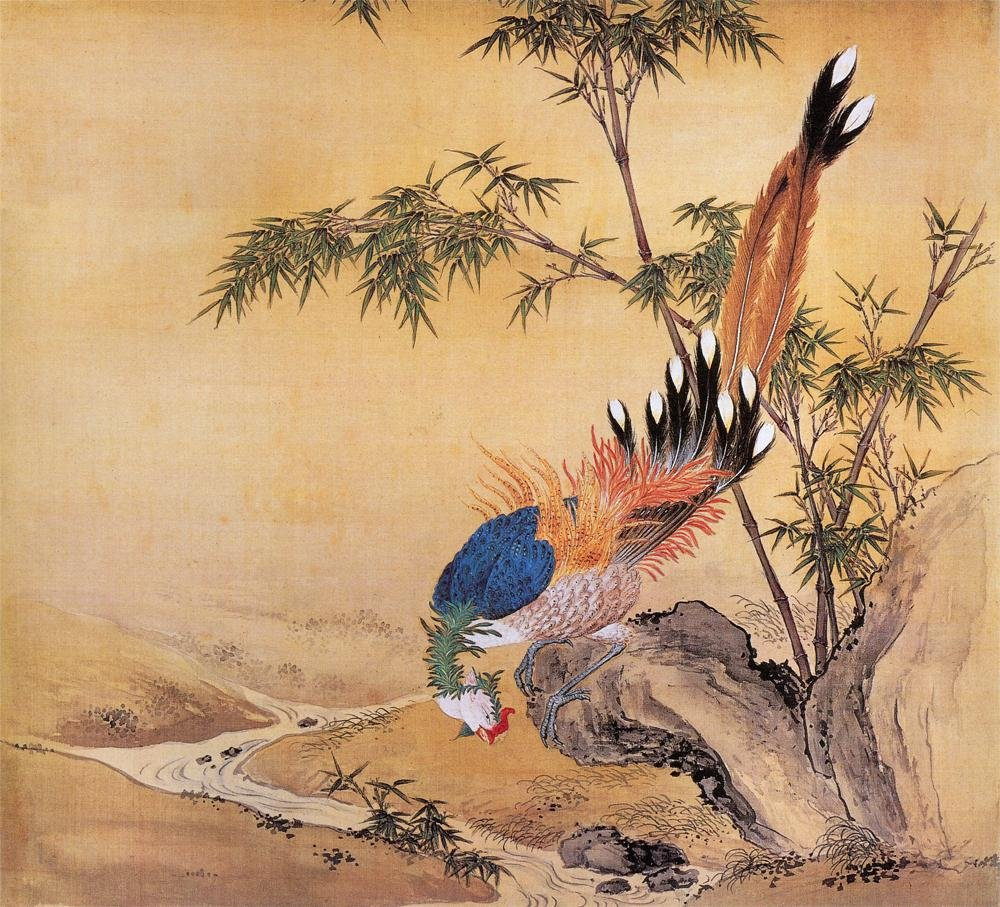
Fenghuang (18th-century) by Yu Sheng.

Yu Sheng or Yu Xing (Chinese: 余省, 1692–after 1767), courtesy name Zengsan (曾三) and art name Luting (魯亭), was a Chinese court painter in the Qing dynasty. A native of Changshu, he studied with Jiang Tingxi and entered the Imperial Academy afterwards. Many of his best paintings themed in flowers, birds, insects, fish. He used not only traditional Chinese painting methods, but also European painting techniques. In 1741, along with Jin Kun, Sun Hu, Ding Guanpeng, Zhang Yusen, and Zhou Kun, he was granted the top rank by the Qianlong Emperor which entitled him to eleven taels of silver per month.

He was the son of Yu Xun (余珣) and the brother of another court painter, Yu Zhi. The brothers were in the residence of the politician Haiwang for two decades before they were summoned to the capital in 1737.
