= Beiji qianjin yaofang =

Book by Sun Simiao

Cover of a printed edition of Beiji qianjin yaofang

Pages of a printed edition

Beiji qianjin yaofang (traditional Chinese: 備急千金要方; simplified Chinese: 备急千金要方; pinyin: Bèijí qiānjīn yàofāng), (Note: Also referred to as Qianjin yaofang (千金要方) or Qianjin fang (千金方).) literally Essential Formulas Worth a Thousand in Gold for Emergencies, is a Chinese medical text by Tang-dynasty physician Sun Simiao, first published in 652. A sequel was published in 682.

== Contents ==
Comprising thirty juan or scrolls, the text is primarily focused on medical disorders and their remedies. The introduction discusses medical diagnosis and treatment, while laying out a moral code for physicians. The remaining twenty-nine juan pertain to, among other things, gynaecology; "wind-induced disorders"; diseases experienced by women and children; "disorders of the seven orifices"; disorders of qi; "cold damage disorders"; "wasting thirst" and hemorrhoids; detoxification; acupuncture and moxibustion.

Authorities cited in the text include Bian Que, Hua Tuo, Wang Shuhe, and Zhang Zhongjing. Uncharacteristically for medical texts of the time, Beiji qianjin yaofang also contains twenty-five case histories.

According to the Zhongyao xueshi (中藥學史), the text has some 3,500 remedies, some of which involve a single drug, whereas others call for as many as sixty-four ingredients, most commonly ginseng, which is contained in 445 remedies. For instance, a certain "White Vetch Pill" that "triggers pregnancy" contains seventeen ingredients mixed with honey, including white vetch; ginseng; angelica; southern asarum; asarum; bull dodder; achyranthes; magnolia bark; pinellia; adenophora; dried ginger; infected silkworm; gentian; Sichuan pepper; aconite; saposhnikovia; and purple aster. Many of the remedies end with warnings such as "Do not transmit it even for a thousand in gold" and "Keep it secret".

== Authorship ==
Beiji qianjin yaofang was written by Sun Simiao, one of the most renowned physicians in Chinese history. In the text's preface, Sun explains his motivations behind compiling thousands of remedies:

I find that all formula books are massive volumes. If one suddenly encounters an emergency, it is very hard to seek the remedy. By the time the formula is acquired, the illness has already become incurable. Alas! I agonize over the calamity of untimely death and lament the follies caused by crude learning. I then widely gathered various classics. I deleted the complicated formulas and made sure to keep the simple ones, thereby producing one book of Essential Formulas Worth a Thousand in Gold for Emergencies.

== Publication history ==
The text was completed and first published in 652. A sequel, titled Qianjin yifang (千金翼方; literally Supplement to Formulas Worth a Thousand in Gold), was published in 682. Beiji qianjin yaofang and its sequel were reedited in the Song dynasty by civil servant Lin Yi (林億) and his colleagues at the Jiaozheng yishu ju (校正醫書局; literally Bureau for Editing Medical Texts); both texts were republished in 1066.

== See also ==
- List of nutrition guides
- List of sources of Chinese culinary history
