= Ying Prefecture (Hebei) =

Historical administrative division in Hebei, China

- Simplified Chinese: 瀛州
- Hanyu Pinyin: Yíng Zhōu
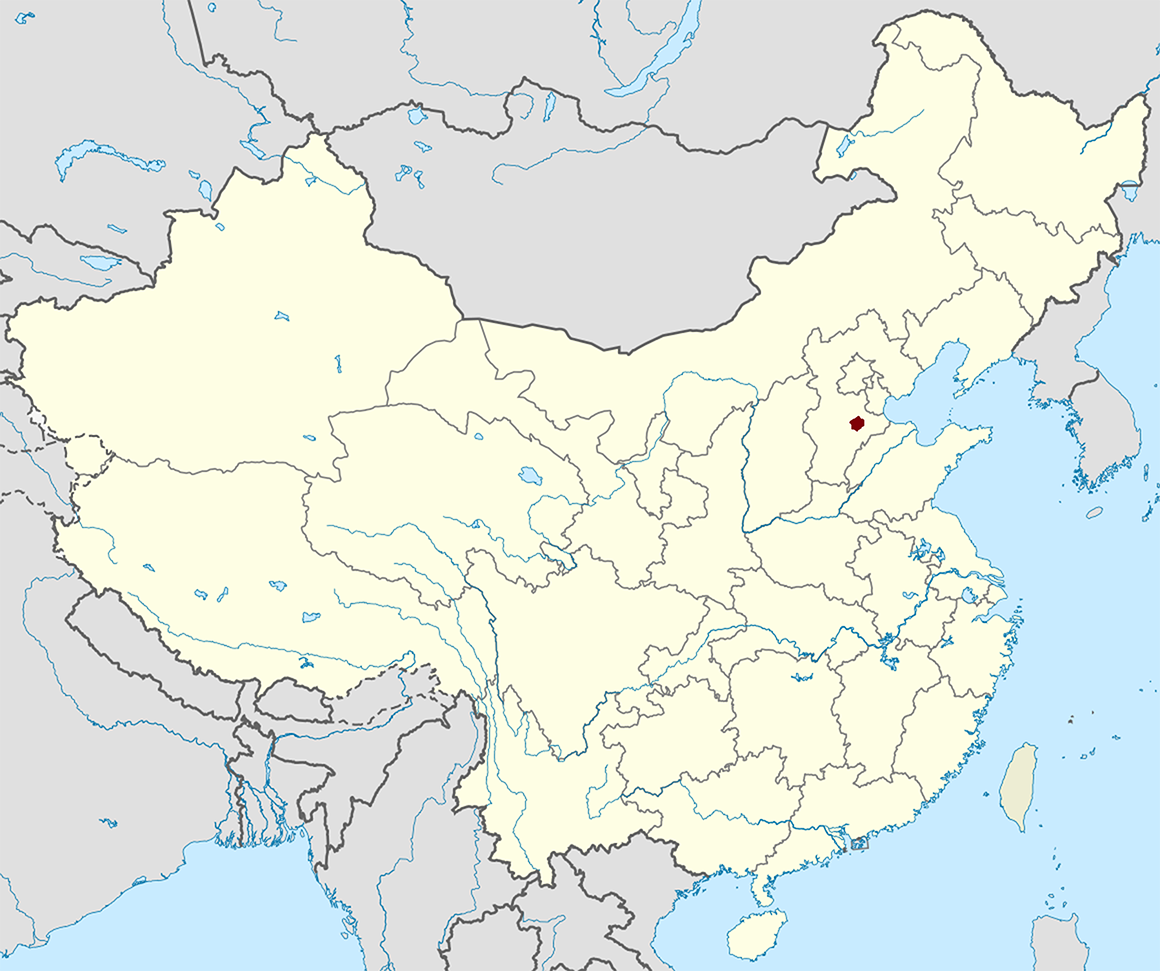
- Population
  - 740s or 750s: 663,171
  - 1100s: 60,206
- History
  - Preceded by: Hejian Commandery
  - Created: 487 (Northern Wei); 621 (Tang dynasty); 758 (Tang dynasty)
  - Abolished: 1108 (Song dynasty)
  - Succeeded by: Hejian Prefecture
- Contained within
  - Circuit: Hebei Circuit; Hebei East Circuit (1042–1108)

Yingzhou or Ying Prefecture was a zhou (prefecture) in imperial China in modern Hebei, China, seated in modern Hejian. It existed (intermittently) from 487 until 1108.

It was one of the Sixteen Prefectures ceded by Later Jin to the Liao dynasty, however, just 2 decades later it was seized by Later Zhou during the Liao–Later Zhou War.

The modern town Yingzhou, Hebei in Hejian retains its name.

== Counties ==
Ying Prefecture administered the following counties (縣) through history:

#	Northern and Southern dynasties	Sui dynasty	Tang dynasty	Five Dynasties period; Song dynasty	Modern location
1	Wuyuan (武垣)			—	Hejian
2	—	Hejian (河間)			Hejian
3	—	Shucheng (束城)			Hejian
4	Chengping (成平)	Jingcheng (景城)			Cang County (western part)
5	Lecheng (樂城)	Guangcheng (廣城), 598–601; Leshou (樂壽), after 601	Leshou		Xian County

Two other counties were administered by Ying Prefecture before the Five Dynasties period:

- Gaoyang (高陽), roughly modern Gaoyang County. In the Song dynasty it was made into a military prefecture called Shun'an Prefecture.
- Pingshu (平舒), roughly modern Dacheng County. After Later Zhou it was renamed Dacheng (大城) and administered by Bà Prefecture.
