= Gui Prefecture (Hebei) =

Historical administrative division in Hebei, China

Guizhou or Gui Prefecture (媯州) was a zhou (prefecture) in imperial China, centering on modern Zhangjiakou, Hebei, China. It was created in 634 by the Tang dynasty and was later ceded by Later Jin to the Khitan-ruled Liao dynasty as one of the Sixteen Prefectures.

== Geography ==
The administrative region of Guizhou in the Tang dynasty is in modern Zhangjiakou in northwestern Hebei. It probably includes parts of modern:

- Zhangjiakou
- Huailai County
- Zhuolu County
- Chicheng County
- Chongli County
- Xuanhua County
- Huai'an County
