= Yu Zhi =

Qing dynasty painter

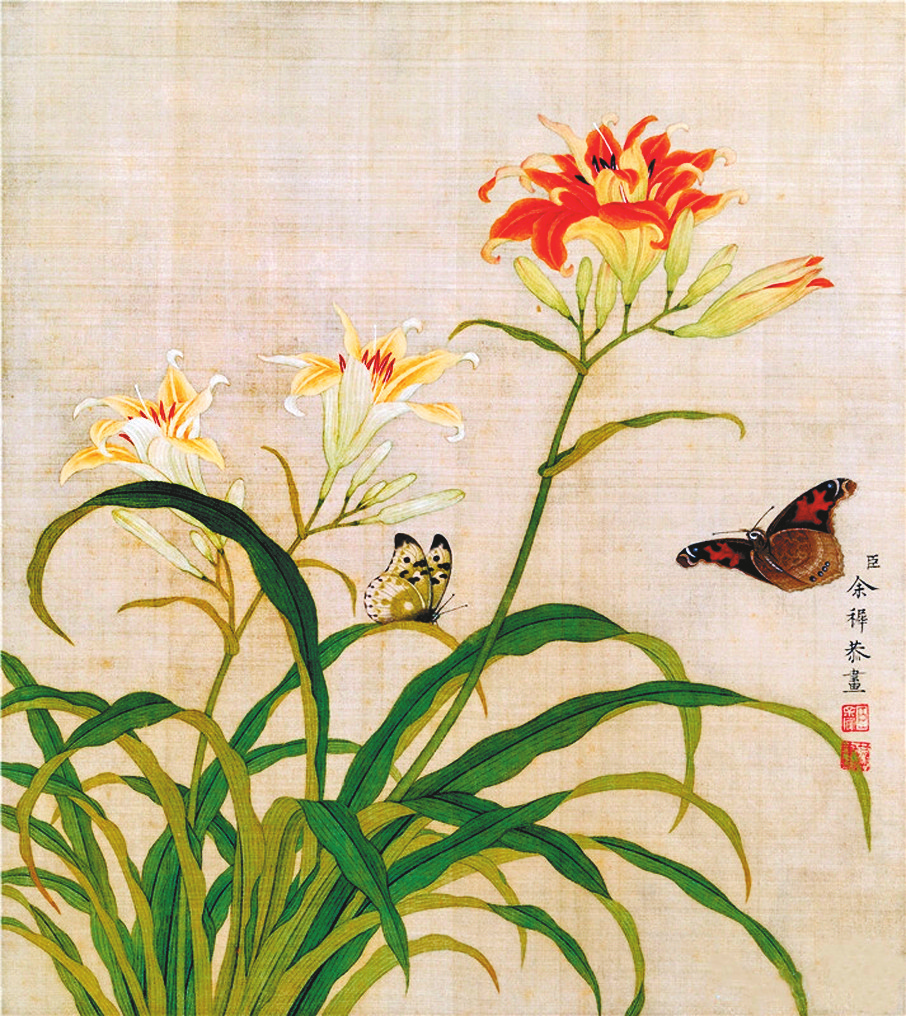
Huanhua Butterfly (18th-century) by Yu Zhi.

Yu Zhi (Chinese: 余穉, fl. 18th century), courtesy name Nanzhou (南洲), was a Chinese court painter in the Qing dynasty. A native of Changshu and the younger son of Yu Xun (余珣), he and his brother Yu Sheng were in the residence of the politician Haiwang for two decades, and studied with the court painter Jiang Tingxi. In 1737, as a result of Haiwang and Jiang's recommendations, the Yu brothers were summoned to the Qianlong Emperor's court along with Zhou Kun. In 1741, Yu Zhi was granted the second rank by the Qianlong Emperor which entitled him to nine taels of silver per month; Yu Sheng was granted the top rank with a monthly income of eleven taels.

Yu Zhi was famous for his paintings of flowers, birds, insects, and fish.
