= Ying Prefecture (Shanxi) =

Historical administrative division in Shanxi, China

Yingzhou or Ying Prefecture (Chinese: 應州) was a zhou (prefecture) in imperial China in modern Shanxi, China, seated in modern Ying County. It existed (intermittently) from the 9th century until 1912.

It was one of the Sixteen Prefectures.

== Geography ==
The administrative region of Yingzhou in the Tang dynasty falls within modern northern Shanxi. It probably includes parts of modern:

- Under the administration of Shuozhou
  - Ying County
  - Shanyin County
- Under the administration of Datong
  - Hunyuan County
