= Ying =

Ying may refer to:

== People ==
- Yíng (嬴), a Chinese surname, the ancestral name of Qin Shi Huang, first Emperor of China in the Qin dynasty, and some contemporary rival royal families such as the Zhaos
- Yīng (应), a Chinese surname from the Zhou dynasty
- Xing (surname) (邢), also spelled Ying based on its Cantonese pronunciation

== Places ==
- Ying (state) (應國), feudal state in Henan during the Zhou dynasty
- Ying River (颖河), in Dengfeng, Henan Province, China
- Ying (Chu) (郢), capital of the ancient State of Chu
- Ying County (應縣), in Shuozhou, Shanxi Province, China

== Other uses ==
- Ying Quartet, a string quartet

== See also ==
- Yin and yang, often misspelled Ying
- Yingzhou (disambiguation)
- Prince Ying (disambiguation)
