= Prince Ying =

Prince Ying may refer to either of the following Qing dynasty princely peerages:

- Prince Ying (穎), created in 1636
- Prince Ying (英), created in 1644

== See also ==
- Prince of Ying (disambiguation)
