= Complete Classics Collection of Ancient China =

Chinese encyclopedia completed in 1725

- Traditional Chinese: 古今圖書集成
- Simplified Chinese: 古今图书集成
- Hanyu Pinyin: Gǔjīn Túshū Jíchéng
- Literal meaning: Complete Collection of Ancient and Modern Illustrations and Books
Transcriptions
Standard Mandarin
- Hanyu Pinyin: Gǔjīn Túshū Jíchéng

Complete Collection of Ancient and Modern Illustrations and Texts
- Traditional Chinese: 欽定古今圖書集成
- Simplified Chinese: 钦定古今图书集成
- Hanyu Pinyin: Qīndìng Gǔjīn Túshū Jíchéng
Transcriptions
Standard Mandarin
- Hanyu Pinyin: Qīndìng Gǔjīn Túshū Jíchéng

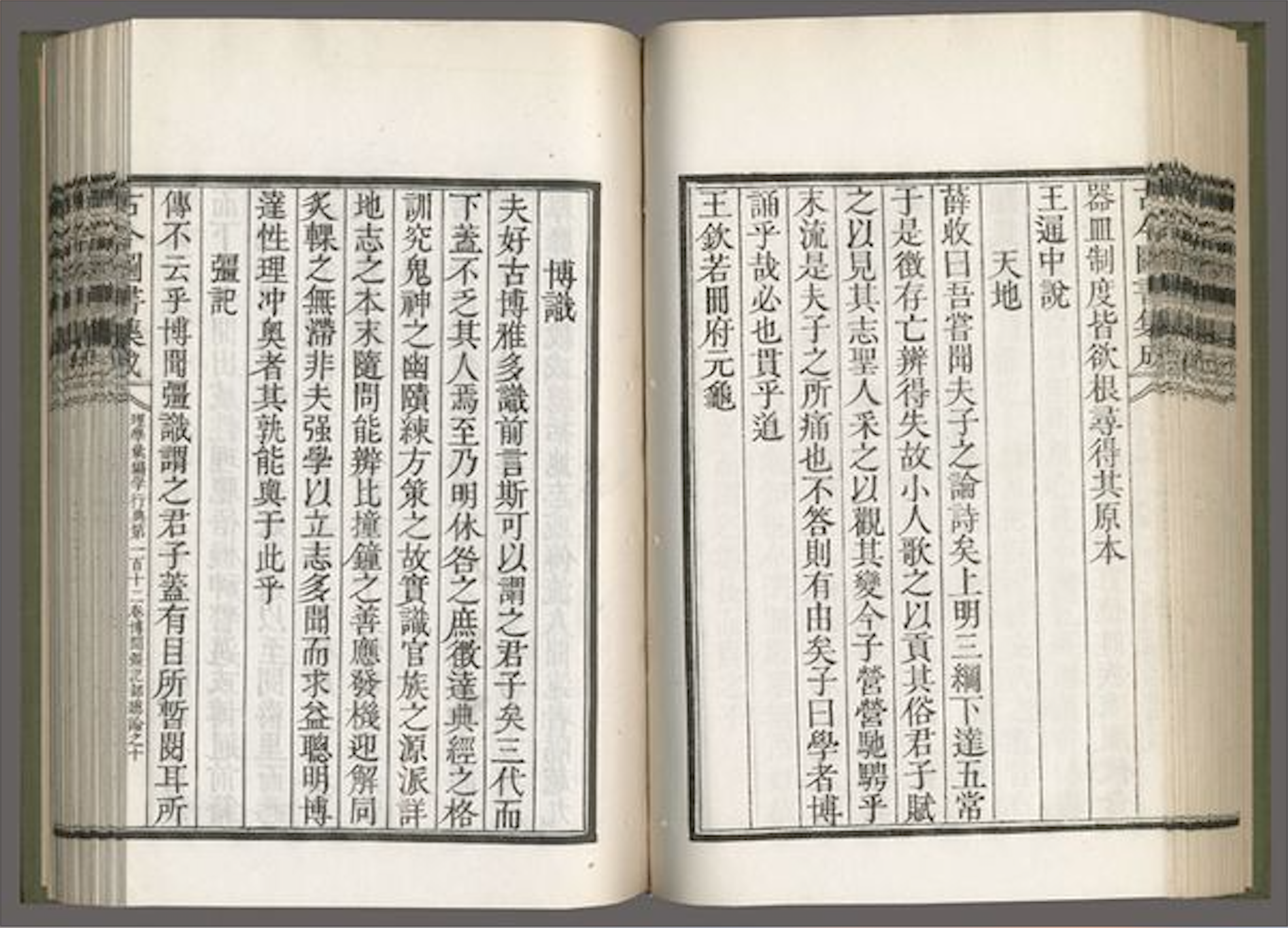
The Columbia University copy of the Complete Classics Collection of Ancient China, rebound in a Western style by Professor Frederick Hirth for ease of handling

The Complete Classics Collection of Ancient China (or the Gujin Tushu Jicheng) is a vast encyclopedic work written in China during the reigns of the Qing dynasty emperors Kangxi and Yongzheng. It was begun in 1700 and completed in 1725. The work was headed and compiled mainly by scholar Chen Menglei (陳夢雷). Later on the Chinese painter Jiang Tingxi helped work on it as well.

The encyclopaedia contained 10,000 volumes. Sixty-four imprints were made of the first edition, known as the Wu-ying Hall edition. The encyclopaedia consisted of 6 series, 32 divisions, and 6,117 sections. It contained 800,000 pages and over 100 million Chinese characters, making it the largest leishu ever printed. Topics covered included natural phenomena, geography, history, literature and government. The work was printed in 1726 using copper movable type printing. It spanned around 10 thousand rolls (卷). To illustrate the huge size of the Complete Classics Collection of Ancient China, it is estimated to have contained 3 to 4 times the amount of material in the Encyclopædia Britannica Eleventh Edition.

In 1908, the Guangxu Emperor of China presented a set of the encyclopaedia in 5,000 fascicles to the China Society of London, which has deposited it on loan to Cambridge University Library. Another one of the three extant copies of the encyclopedia outside of China is located at the C.V. Starr East Asian Library at Columbia University. A complete copy in Japan was destroyed in the 1923 Great Kantō earthquake.

One of Yongzheng's brothers patronised the project for a while, although Yongzheng contrived to give exclusive credit to his father Kangxi instead.

== Name ==
The Complete Classics Collection of Ancient China is known as the Gujin Tushu Jicheng (traditional Chinese: 古今圖書集成; simplified Chinese: 古今图书集成; pinyin: Gǔjīn Túshū Jíchéng; Wade–Giles: Ku-chin t'u-shu chi-ch'eng; lit. 'complete collection of illustrations and books from the earliest period to the present') or Qinding Gujin Tushu Jicheng (Chinese: 欽定古今圖書集成) in Chinese, also translated as the Imperial Encyclopaedia, the Complete Collection of Ancient and Modern Illustrations and Texts, the Complete Collection of Ancient and Modern Writings and Charts, or the Complete Collection of Illustrations and Writings from the Earliest to Current Times.

== Compilation ==
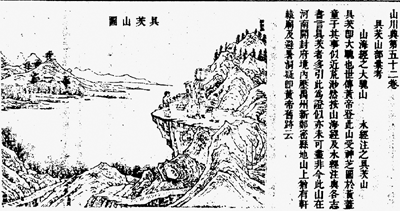
Illustration of mountains and rivers in Volume 52 of the Complete Classics Collection of Ancient China (3rd year of Yongzheng, Qing dynasty, 1725, Chen Menglei)

The Kangxi Emperor hired Chen Menglei of Fuzhou to compile the encyclopedia. From 1700 to 1705, Chen Menglei worked day and night, writing most of the book, including 10,000 volumes and around 160 million words. It was originally titled the Compendium (Chinese: 圖書彙編; pinyin: Túshū Huìbiān). By 1706 the book's first draft was completed, and the Kangxi emperor changed the title to Complete Classics Collection of Ancient China (Gujin Tushu Jicheng). When the Yongzheng emperor ascended the throne, he ordered Jiang Tingxi to help Chen Menglei finish the encyclopedia for publication by around 1725.

== Outline ==
The 6 series are as follows.

1. Heavens/Time/Calendrics (历象): Celestial objects, the seasons, calendar mathematics and astronomy, heavenly portents
2. Earth/Geography (方舆): Mineralogy, political geography, list of rivers and mountains, other nations (Korea, Japan, India, Kingdom of Khotan, Ryukyu Kingdom)
3. Man/Society (明论): Imperial attributes and annals, the imperial household, biographies of mandarins, kinship and relations, social intercourse, dictionary of surnames, human relations, biographies of women
4. Nature (博物): Procivilities (crafts, divination, games, medicine), spirits and unearthly beings, fauna, flora (all life forms on Earth)
5. Philosophy (理学): Classics of non-fiction, aspects of philosophy (numerology, filial piety, shame, etc.), forms of writing, philology and literary studies
6. Economy (经济): education and imperial examination, maintenance of the civil service, food and commerce, etiquette and ceremony, music, the military system, the judicial system, styles of craft and architecture

The six series in total are subdivided into 32 subdivisions.

Note that a pre-modern sense is intended in both "society" (that is, high society) and "economy" (which could be called "society" today), and the other major divisions do not match precisely to English terms.

== Gallery ==
=== Part 1: Heavens/Astronomy ===
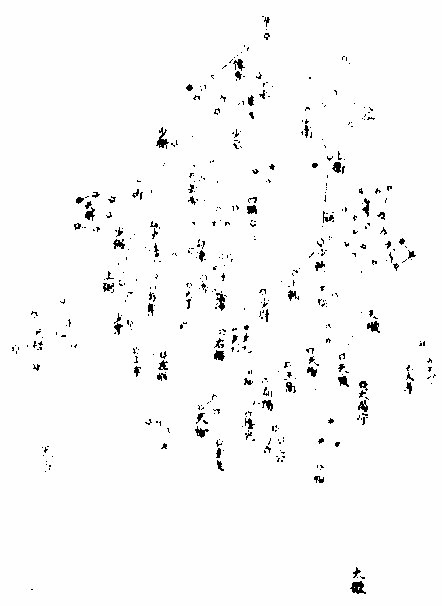

=== Part 2: Geography ===
Territories

Map of the Qing dynasty's east coast (Mongolia and Taiwan marked as 蒙古 and 臺灣, Ryukyu and Korea marked as 琉球 and 朝鮮)

Further inside China (Chengdu marked as 成都 and the northern desert marked as 沙漠)

Map of Shanxi

Map of Wuzhou (梧州府)

Map of Guangdong and its borders to Jiaozhi (Vietnam)

Map of Fujian

==== Borders ====
Yuanguguo / Xuanguguo (玄股國), one of the countries in Huainanzi

Kingdom of Sicily (Southern Italy), transcribed as 斯伽里野

Ma'ata (麻阿塔國), possibly referring to Malta, located in the Mediterranean Sea

Image of person from Kalingga Kingdom in Java (大闍婆國)

Srivijaya (三佛齊國)

Kingdom of women (女人國), recorded in travels during the Yuan, Ming, and Qing dynasties, possibly referring to some part of Australia. It is mentioned in the History of Yuan and was described by the Yuan dynasty traveler Wang Dayuan.

Ryukyu Kingdom

Kingdom of Jiaozhi (交趾國), now Vietnam.

=== Part 3: Society ===
==== Human Affairs ====
Describes some anatomy of the human body

Diagram of human body

Liver diagram

Dragon

==== Imperial Harem ====
Palace Doors, Harem

=== Part 4: Nature ===
Image of Nüwa

==== Plant Kingdom ====
Ranunculus sceleratus (石龍芮)

=== Part 5: Philosophy ===
==== Canonical and other Literature section ====
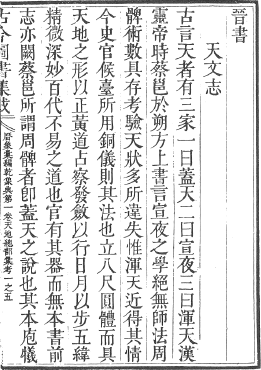
Page from the Complete Classics Collection of Ancient China

Guhe diagram (古河圖)

Hetu Shengchengtu (河圖生成圖)

Fuxi (伏羲) diagram

Bagua

Qiankun (乾坤) diagram

Tiandiji number diagram (天地极数图)

Bagua trigrams

Xingtu (性图) with calendar dates

Mathematics

Odd numbers: 1, 3, 5, 7, 9, etc.

Parity: even and odd numbers

==== Education and Conduct ====
Taijitu and Wuxing (Chinese philosophy)

Fuxi's Taijitu

==== Study of Characters ====
Wang Yingdian liuyi tujie (王應電六義圖解)

=== Part 6: Economy ===
==== Military ====
Crossbowmen

Navy

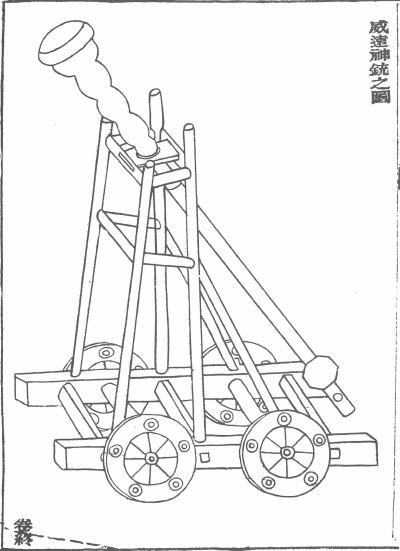
Counterweight trebuchet

==== Punishments and blessing ====
Nine star diagram (九星图)

== See also ==
- Yongle Encyclopedia
- Complete Library of the Four Treasuries
- Hua Sui
- Cefu Yuangui
