= Tongue diagnosis =

Pseudoscientific method of diagnosis

Common tongue syndromes

Tongue diagnosis in traditional Chinese medicine is a method of diagnosing disease and disease patterns by visual inspection of the tongue and its various features. It is one of the major diagnostic methods in traditional Chinese medicine since the time of the Yellow Emperor's Inner Classic. It is considered a part of the inspection method within the four methods of diagnosis. Practitioners claim that the tongue provides important clues reflecting the conditions of the internal organs. Like other diagnostic methods in traditional Chinese medicine, tongue diagnosis is based on the "outer reflects the inner" principle, which is that external structures often reflect the conditions of the internal structures and can give us important indications of internal disharmony.

== Topography of the tongue ==
The tongue is divided into topographic regions corresponding to the triple burner and zangfu organs. By observing the various regions of the tongue, one can determine where the disease is located within the body.

One method of mapping the tongue is by dividing it into three sections to correspond to the triple burner. The tip of the tongue corresponds to the upper burner (heart, lungs); the middle corresponds to the middle burner (stomach, spleen), and the base of the tongue corresponds to the lower burner (kidneys, bladder, intestines).

Another method is to map the tongue by zangfu organs. The tip of the tongue corresponds with the Heart, the region at the front of the tongue between the tip and the center corresponds to the Lung, the center corresponds with stomach and spleen, the right side corresponds to the gallbladder, the left side corresponds to the liver, and the base of the tongue corresponds to kidney, bladder, large intestine, and small intestine.

== Aspects of the tongue ==
The aspects of the tongue considered in diagnosis include:

- Tongue spirit or vitality
- Body color
- Body shape
- Tongue coating
- Tongue moisture

In addition, various features are also considered, including absence or presence of and the characteristics of movement, bristles, cracks, and teethmarks.

== Normal tongue ==
A normal, healthy tongue is pale red or pink with a thin white coating. The tongue should have spirit, but it should not tremble or quiver. It should have a shape which is not too swollen or flabby, with no cracks, and be slightly moist.

== Significance of the tongue in diagnosis ==
When differentiating between various patterns in clinical settings, tongue diagnosis plays a significant role. In a situation in which a patient has complex or even conflicting clinical presentations, TCM practitioners claim the tongue body color nearly always reflects the true underlying condition. For example, a patient may present with various localized signs of heat, however, the tongue may reflect an underlying condition of cold from yang deficiency. In this case it is important to consider the underlying condition in the treatment principle.

== Scientific evaluation ==
A 2008 study found that interpractitioner and intrapractitioner reliability levels were low. The features of the tongue are claimed to be tied to specific body parts, but evidence is lacking.

== See also ==
- Pulse diagnosis
