= Zhou Ying =

Zhou Ying may refer to:

- Zhou Ying (actress) (born 1984), Chinese actress based in Singapore
- Zhou Ying (table tennis) (born 1988), Chinese table tennis player
- Zhou Ying (swimmer) (born 1989), Chinese paralympic swimmer

== See also ==
- Nancy Zhou (born 1993), Chinese-American violinist, Chinese name Zhou Ying (周颖)
