= Sun Simiao =

Chinese physician and writer (died 682)

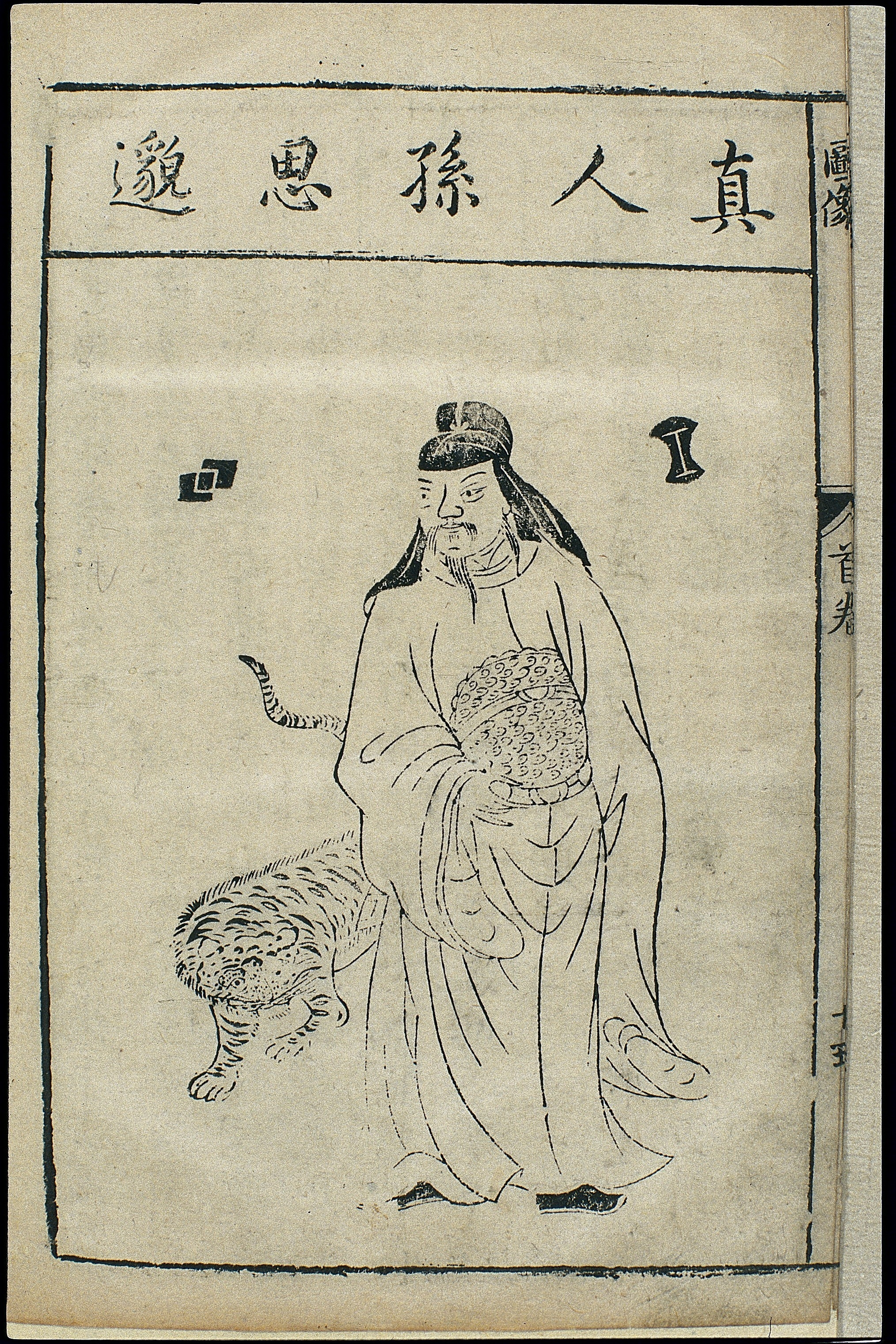
Sun Simiao as depicted by Gan Bozong, woodcut print, Tang dynasty (618–907)

Sun Simiao (traditional Chinese: 孫思邈; simplified Chinese: 孙思邈; pinyin: Sūn Sīmiǎo; Wade–Giles: Sun Ssu-miao; 581–682) was a Chinese physician and writer of the Sui and Tang dynasty, who was from Tongchuan, central Shaanxi. He was titled as China's King of Medicine (藥王; 药王, Yaowang) for his significant contributions to Chinese medicine and tremendous care to his patients.

== Books ==
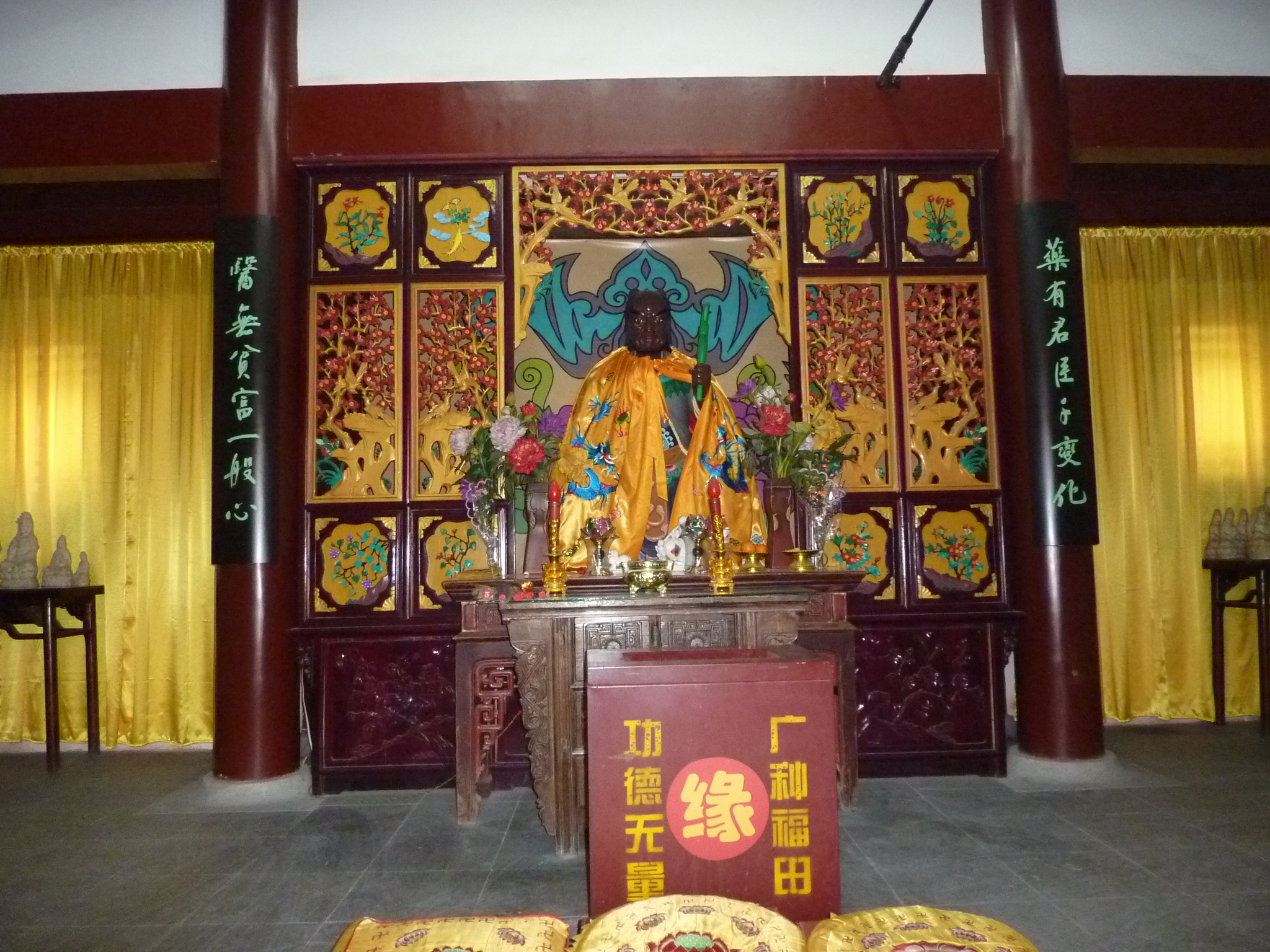
Yaowang in the Tianfei Palace, Nanjing

Sun wrote many books, of which two—Beiji qianjin yaofang ("Essential Formulas for Emergencies [Worth] a Thousand Pieces/Catty of Gold") and Qian Jin Yi Fang ("Supplement to the Formulas of a Thousand Gold Worth")—were milestones in the history of Chinese medicine. They summarized pre-Tang dynasty medicine. The former listed about 5300 recipes for medicines, and the latter 2000. He also put forth the “Thirteen measures to keep health”, which claimed that actions like touching hair, rolling eyes, walking, and shaking heads improved health.

Apart from this, he is known for the text "On the Absolute Sincerity of Great Physicians," often called "the Chinese Hippocratic Oath," or called "Dayi Heart", which comes from the first chapter of the first of the above-mentioned two books. This portion of the book is still a required reading for Chinese physicians. The following is an excerpt of the text:

A Great Physician should not pay attention to status, wealth or age; neither should he question whether the particular person is attractive or unattractive, whether he is an enemy or friend, whether he is a Chinese or a foreigner, or finally, whether he is uneducated or educated. He should meet everyone on equal grounds. He should always act as if he were thinking of his close relatives.

The work Essential Subtleties on the Silver Sea (銀海精微, yínhǎi jīngwēi) was probably written by Sun Simiao. It was published at the end of the Yuan dynasty (1271−1368) and has had wide influence on the Chinese ophthalmology until today.

In addition to his medical work, Sun also experimented in Chinese waidan external alchemy and may have been an initiated Daoist adept. The sinologist Nathan Sivin says Sun Simiao's famous Danjing yaojue 丹經要訣 "Essential Formulas of Alchemical Classics"

[...] is as close to a modern laboratory handbook as anything we are likely to find in ancient literature. Following a preface and a catalogue of elixir names, there is a set of detailed specifications for necessities of the laboratory, including the liuyini 六一泥 "six-one" lute which was universally employed in Chinese pharmacology and alchemy for the hermetical sealing of reaction vessels. Finally, there are the recipes themselves: ingredients grouped at the beginning, with weight and advance preparation clearly noted, and perspicacious, concise directions for compounding and using the products.

Sun believed deeply that the science of alchemichal elixers would help humans achieve immortality. A tenth-century historian wrote that Sun's body did not decay for some time after his death, due to the amount of murcury he ingested while trying to develop the perfect elixer of immortality.

Mercury is an esoteric term of the life-force contained in the semen/ovum, this is the Mercury when transmuted through Taoist Sexual Alchemy arises up the spine like a thermometer, and in doing so awakening the glands in the body, sexual organ glands, pineal, pituitary, thyroid, parathyroid, thymus, pancreas, adrenal, etc., all the glands that produce hormones to keep the body maintained in optimal balance then harmony remains in the individual throughout their life preventing disease, in higher practice the transmuted creative lifeforce feeds the soul and spirit bodies as vehicles of travel beyond physical death, having these vehicles developed one is said to be an Immortal, for explanation how to achieve this see the works of Mantak Chia.

== Religious life ==
Sun preferred life far away from court, and tended to live essentially as a hermit. He was a devout Daoist and did work with Emperor Gaozong, and probably Empress Wu, on their Daoist studies. Sun was not, however, open only to traditional Chinese ideas. He was a student of Buddhism, as well. Fazang, a Chinese Sogdian monk, is credited with bringing the Avatamsaka sect of Buddhism to the Tang Dynasty, and Sun helped popularize it, as well. Some historians believe that Sun introduced Gaozang and Wu to study of the Avatamsaka, of which they became great patrons and supporters. Scholars argue that he is most accurately thought of us a "Buddho-Daoist."

Ultimately, after Sun's death, Fazang composed the best-known biography of Sun.

== Bibliography ==
- Komjathy, Louis (2022) 'Lesson 14: Principles of Yǎngshēng 養生 (Nourishing Life) Bǎoshēng míng 保生銘 (Inscription on Protecting Life)', in Primer for Translating Daoist Literature. Auckland: Purple Cloud Press
- Sivin, Nathan (1968). Chinese Alchemy: Preliminary Studies. Cambridge: Harvard University Press.
