= Yun Prefecture (Shanxi) =

Historical administrative division in Shanxi, China

Yunzhou or Yun Prefecture (Chinese: 雲州) was a zhou (prefecture) in imperial China seated in modern Datong, Shanxi, China. It existed (intermittently) from 640 to 1044.

It was one of the Sixteen Prefectures.
