= Prince of Ying =

Prince of Ying may refer to:

- Emperor Zhongzong of Tang (656–710), Tang dynasty emperor, known as Prince of Ying (英王) from 677 to 680
- Li Ying (prince) (died 737), Tang dynasty prince, known as Prince of Ying (郢王) from 712 to 715
- Emperor Wuzong of Tang (814–846), Tang dynasty emperor, known as Prince of Ying (穎王) from 821 to 840
- Zhu Yougui (c. 888–913), Later Liang dynasty emperor, known as Prince of Ying (郢王) from 907 to 912
- Chen Yucheng (c. 1837–1862), general and prince of the Taiping Heavenly Kingdom, known as Prince of Ying (英王) after 1859

== See also ==
- Prince Ying (disambiguation) for Qing dynasty princely peerages
