= Ying Prefecture (Guangdong) =

Historical administrative division in Guangdong, China

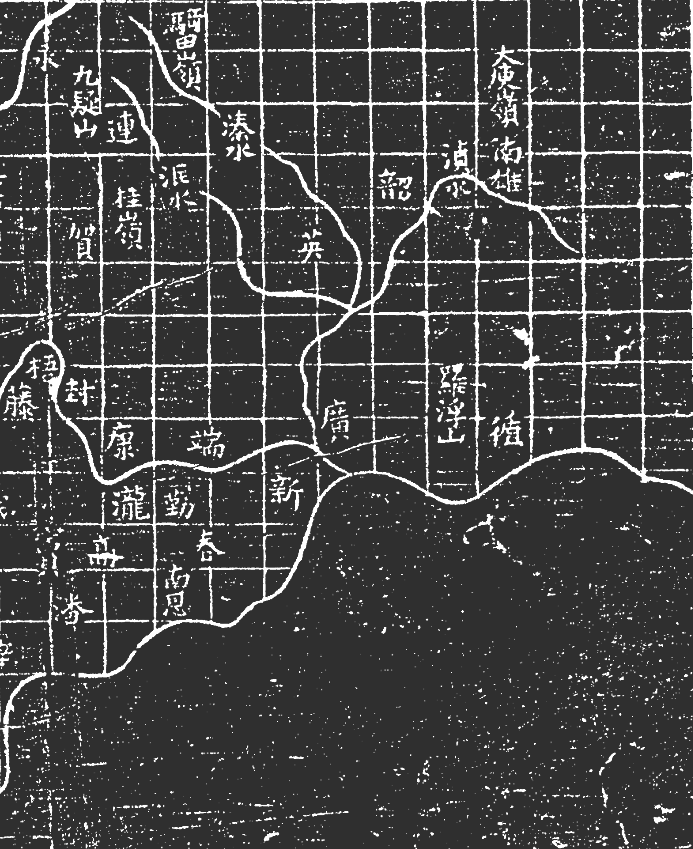
- Yingzhou on the Song-era Yuji Tu
- Chinese: 英州
Transcriptions
Standard Mandarin
- Hanyu Pinyin: Yīngzhōu
- Wade–Giles: Ying-chou

Yingzhou or Ying Prefecture was a prefecture (zhou) in Imperial China centering on modern-day Yingde, Guangdong. It existed intermittently from 947 until 1195.
