= Li Hui (artist) =

Chinese artist (1977–2020)

Li Hui was a Chinese contemporary artist.

== Biography ==
Beijing based artist Li Hui (1977–2020) graduated from the China Central Academy of Fine Arts in 2003. . As a conceptual artist, he worked in diverse mediums including transparent neon-lit acrylic sculptures and laser beams, and visualized the uniqueness and new boundaries of the new age of Chinese New Media art in his sculptures.

With the help of most modern techniques, Li Hui articulated considerations and an almost poetic aura surround the result.

Li Hui and his work have been featured in various art exhibitions, e.g. Museum Moderner Kunst Stiftung Ludwig Wien (AUT), the National Art Museum of China in Beijing (CN) and the National Museum of Contemporary Art Seoul, (South Korea).

Besides that, Li Hui exhibited at Busan Biennale (South Korea) (2006), Shanghai Biennale (CN) (2006), Chengdu Biennale (CN) (2005)

=== Death ===
Li Hui has died at the age of 43 on 4 May 2020 of an undisclosed illness.

== Publications ==
- Young Chinese Artists; Christoph Noe et al.; Prestel; 2008
