= Jiang Tingxi =

Chinese artist (1669–1732)

First Class adaha hafan Jiang Tingxi
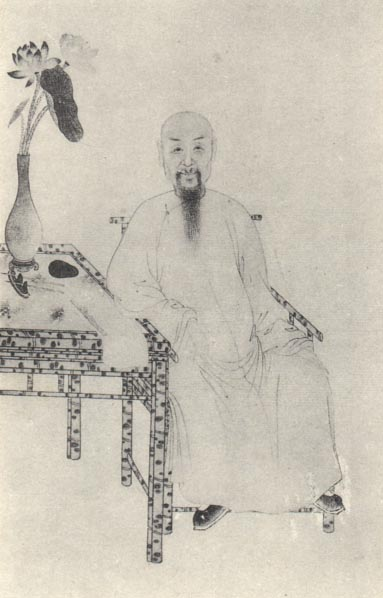

Grand Secretary of the Wenyuan Library
- In office 22 February 1732 – 9 September 1732

Grand Councillor
- In office 5 July 1729 – 9 September 1732

Minister of Revenue
- In office 22 April 1726 – 9 September 1732 Serving with Fan Shiyi
- Preceded by: Zhang Tingyu
- Succeeded by: Peng Weixin

Personal details
- Born: 12 November 1669 Changshu, Jiangsu, China
- Died: 9 September 1732 (aged 62) Beijing, China
- Relations: Jiang Chenxi (brother)
- Parent: Jiang Yi (father)
- Occupation: politician, painter, scholar
- Courtesy name: Youjun (酉君) or Yangsun (楊孫)
- Art name: Xigu (西谷), Nansha (南沙), Qingtong Jushi (青桐居士)
- Posthumous name: Wensu (文肅)

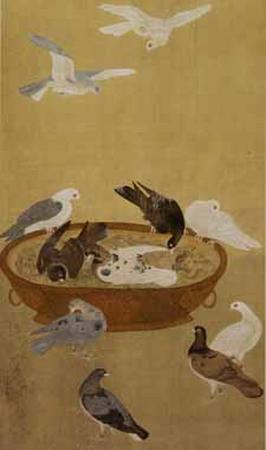
"Eleven Pigeons" painting by Jiang Tingxi

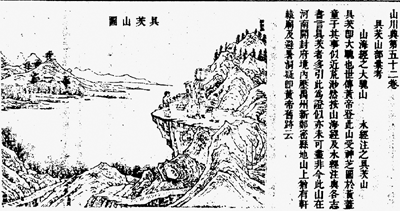
"Complete Classics Collection of Ancient China" encyclopaedia by Chen Menglei and Jiang Tingxi

Jiang Tingxi (simplified Chinese: 蒋廷锡; traditional Chinese: 蔣廷錫; pinyin: Jiǎng Tíngxí; Wade–Giles: Chiang T'ing-hsi, 12 November 1669 – 9 September 1732), courtesy name Yangsun (楊孫), was a Chinese painter, and an editor of the encyclopedia Complete Classics Collection of Ancient China.

Jiang was born in Changshu, Jiangsu. Besides the name Yangsun, he was also known by his courtesy name Youjun (酉君), as well as the pseudonyms Nansha (南沙), Qingtong Jushi, Qiujun, and XiGu (西谷).

The 5020-volume state-sponsored encyclopedia Complete Classics Collection of Ancient China (古今图书集成; 古今圖書集成; 'Complete Collection of Illustrations and Writings from the Earliest to Current Times') was published in 1726 and had been compiled by Chen Menglei and Jiang Tingxi during the reigns of the Kangxi and Yongzheng emperors in the Qing dynasty.

As an official painter and grand secretary to the imperial court, Jiang used a wide variety of artistic styles, and focused particularly on paintings of birds and flowers. He was also proficient in calligraphy. His works influenced later court painters, including Yu Sheng (余省), Yu Zhi (余稚).

Although better known for his Complete Classics Collection of Ancient China, Jiang also contributed—along with other scholars—in the compilation of the "Daqing Yitongzhi" ('Gazetteer of the Qing Empire'). This geographical gazetteer was provided with a preface in 1744 (more than a decade after Jiang's death), revised in 1764, and reprinted in 1849.

Apart from cultural activity, as a holder of the jinshi degree Tinxi performed the important duties in the Qing government's Office of Military Finance, on par with Zhang Tingyu (headed by Yinxiang, the Yongzheng Emperor's brother).

== See also ==
- Chen Menglei
- Zhang Tingyu
- Complete Classics Collection of Ancient China
