= Hui Li (electrical engineer) =

Chinese-American electrical engineer

Hui "Helen" Li is a Chinese-American electrical engineer specializing in power electronics, electric power conversion and energy storage for renewable energy. She is FSU Provost McKenzie Professor of Electrical and Computer Engineering in the Florida A&M University – Florida State University College of Engineering.

== Education and career ==
Li earned a bachelor's degree in electrical engineering from the Huazhong University of Science and Technology in China in 1992, and continued there for a master's degree in 1995. She has a 2000 Ph.D. from the University of Tennessee.

After working for the Oak Ridge National Laboratory and Tyco International, she joined Florida State University as an assistant professor in 2002. She was promoted to associate professor in 2008 and full professor in 2013.

== Recognition ==
Li was named an IEEE Fellow in 2018, "for contributions to bidirectional converters for utility applications and high efficiency PV converters".
