= Chen Menglei =

Qing dynasty writer of the Gujin Tushu Jicheng encyclopedia

- 陳夢雷
- Born: 1650; Houguan, Fuzhou, Fujian, China
- Died: 1741 (aged 90–91); Heilongjiang, China
- Occupations: Encyclopedist, historian, philosopher
- Era: Kangxi era
- Organization: Hanlin Academy
- Known for: Gujin Tushu Jicheng

Chinese name
- Chinese: 陈梦雷
Transcriptions

Zezhen
- Simplified Chinese: 则震
Transcriptions

Shengzhai
- Simplified Chinese: 省斋
Transcriptions

Songhe laoren
- Chinese: 松鹤老人
Transcriptions

Tianyidaoren
- Chinese: 天一道人
Transcriptions

Chen Menglei (Chinese: 陳夢雷; Chinese: 陈梦雷; 1650–1741) was a Chinese encyclopedist, historian, and philosopher. He was a scholar-writer known for being the chief editor, compiler, and author of the Gujin Tushu Jicheng Chinese encyclopedia. In 1670, he became a Jinshi. Chen Menglei conducted research for over 50 years, covering more than 10,000 volumes of books, and in 1701 was entrusted by Kangxi to compile the Gujin Tushu Jicheng encyclopedia, which Chen completed in four and a half years.

Chen Menglei also had the courtesy name Zezhen (则震), sobriquet or art name Shengzhai (省斋), and epithet "Pine Crane Elder" (松鶴老人).

== Life ==
Chen Menglei was born in modern-day Fuzhou in Houguan county. In 1670, at the age of 20, he obtained his scholar degree, became a Jinshi, and was selected as a scholar for the Hanlin Academy. In 1673, he returned to his hometown to visit his relatives, which coincided with the revolution, and he was caught in the midst of the rebel fighting. Chen Menglei at the time was friends with fellow writer Li Guangdi. Chen Sui (陈遂) and Li Guangdi together went to the office of Fujian chancellor Fu Hongji (富鴻基) to demonstrate their loyalty to the Qing regime. In 1676, in September, the Qing soldiers passed through Xianxia pass (仙霞关) to enter Fujian, and Geng Jingzhong surrendered. At this time, as part of machinations by Li Guangdi, Menglei was framed and falsely accused by Xu Hongbi (徐鴻弼) from the Geng faction. Chen Menglei was mistakenly taken for Chen Fang (陳昉). But later Chen Menglei cleared his name and showed his innocence.

=== Writing the Gujin Tushu Jicheng ===
In 1698, Kangxi made an eastern tour, and Chen Menglei went to work and study with the third son of Kangxi: Yinzhi. Chen Menglei's study was changed to "Songheshan Room" (松鶴山房), and he called himself "Songhe Elder" (松鶴老人), meaning "Pine Crane Elder" as Kangxi gave the couplet "The pine is tall and the branches and leaves are luxuriant, while the old crane has new feathers."

During this period, in October of 1701, Chen began to compile the book, the Compendium, or Tushu Huibian (图书汇编). Chen Menglei referred to the "Xieyitang" (协一堂) book collection and more than 15,000 volumes of ancient books in his own family to classify and edit the encyclopedia. After five years (1701-1705) of 'eye to eye inspection, morning and evening' (“目营手检，无间晨夕”), in May of 1705, he completed the Compendium.

There are 10,000 volumes of the book and 40 volumes of catalogues, with a total of 160 million words. The whole book is divided into six parts: Astronomy/Calendar, Geography, Society, Nature, Philosophy, Economics, etc. (历象、方舆、明论、博物、理学、经济等). Each edition is divided into several codices, totaling 36 codices, and each codex is divided into cadres, totaling 6,109. There are many contents, and the classification is clear.

In the 1706, the first draft was completed, and after Kangxi inspected it, he changed the title from Compendium to the Gujin Tushu Jicheng (古今图书集成), literally a 'compilation of ancient and modern books'. When the Yongzheng ascended the throne, he ordered Jiang Tingxi to help Chen Menglei finish completing the encyclopedia. In 1934, the Zhonghua Book Company (中华书局) published copies of the encyclopedia signing Chen Menglei's name.

Zhang Tingyu commented: "Since writing was invented, there has been no book like the Gujin Tushu Jicheng that covered every single area of knowledge from the past and the present."

In Chen Menglei's "Songheshan Fangji" (《松鹤山房集》), Volume 2, "Starting the Compendium" (《进汇编启》 jin huibian qi), it is mentioned that in this great book "everything across the country, including Thirteen Classics and the 21 Histories, was covered. Almost nothing was left out from the collection of unofficial histories except for one or two works."

In 1722, the Kangxi emperor died. Chen Menglei continued to study with Prince Cheng, Yinzhi. However the incoming Yongzheng Emperor had been opposed by Yinzhi, and in January 1723, Chen Menglei and his two children moved to Heilongjiang, having been exiled by the new emperor. At this time, Chen Menglei was 74 years old. In 1741, Chen Menglei died of illness in a garrison, aged 92.

== Works ==
- Gujin Tushu Jicheng
- Gaodu Chenghuangwen (《告都城隍文》), July 1680: on City God (China)
