= Yingzhoulu Subdistrict =

Yingzhoulu 瀛州路街道
- Subdistrict
- Interactive map of Yingzhoulu
- Country: People's Republic of China
- Province: Hebei
- Prefecture-level city: Cangzhou
- County-level city: Hejian
- Time zone: UTC+8 (China Standard)

Yingzhoulu Subdistrict is a subdistrict in Hejian, Cangzhou, Hebei, China. Prior to 2016 it was a town known as Yingzhou Town (瀛州镇).
