= Hejian =

Hejian 河间市 Hokien, Ho-chien
- County-level city
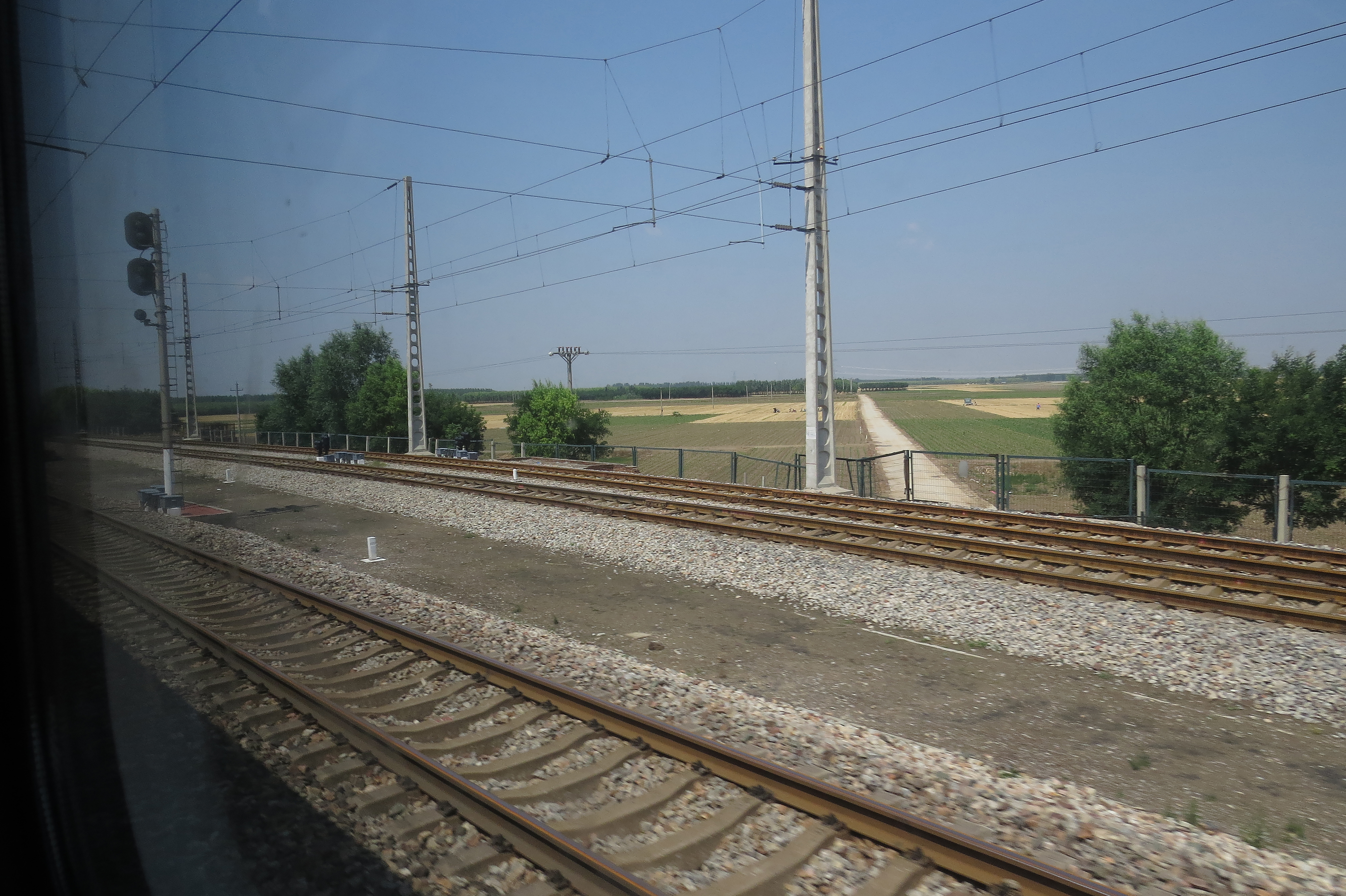
- Hejian West railway station

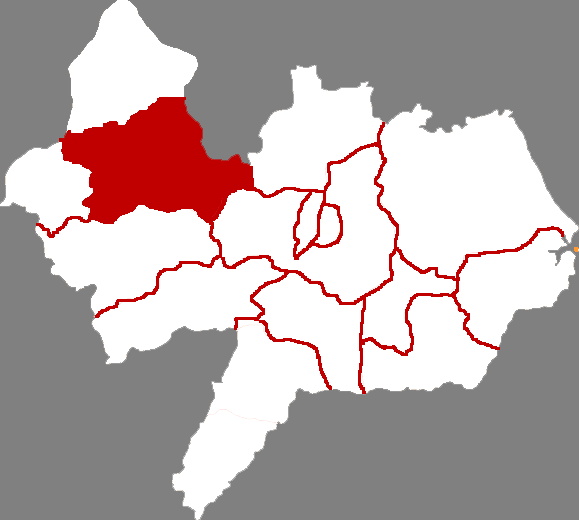
- Hejian in Cangzhou

- Location of the city center in Hebei
- Coordinates (Hejian government): 38°26′48″N 116°05′58″E
- Country: People's Republic of China
- Province: Hebei
- Prefecture-level city: Cangzhou
- City seat: Yingzhoulu Subdistrict

Area
  - County-level city: 1,322.0 km^{2} (510.4 sq mi)
- Elevation: 14 m (46 ft)

Population (2020)
  - County-level city: 795,198
  - Density: 601.51/km^{2} (1,557.9/sq mi)
  - Urban: 296,820
- Time zone: UTC+8 (China Standard)
- Postal code: 062450
- Area code: 0317
- Website: www.hejian.gov.cn

Hejian (simplified Chinese: 河间; traditional Chinese: 河間; pinyin: Héjiān; Wade–Giles: Ho Chien; alternative romanizations: Ho Dsien , Ho-kien[-fou]) is a county-level city under the administration of the prefecture-level city of Cangzhou, in the east-central part of Hebei province, China. As of 2020, the population was ca. 795,198 inhabitants and the city territory was 1,333 km^{2} (515 sq mi). Hejian is situated along China National Highway 106.

== History ==
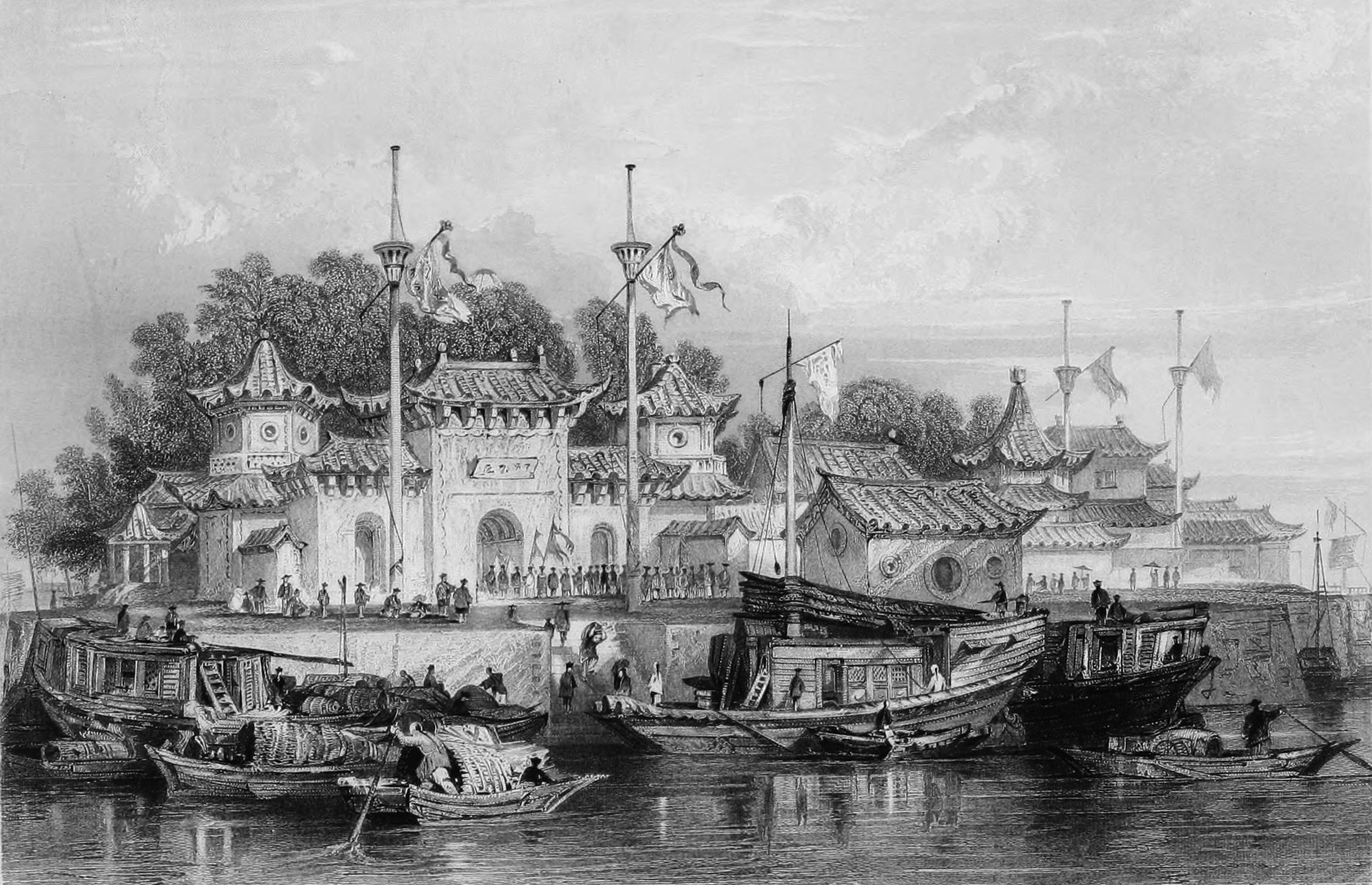
"A military station near the city of Chokien", i.e. probably Hejian. (Ca. 1844)

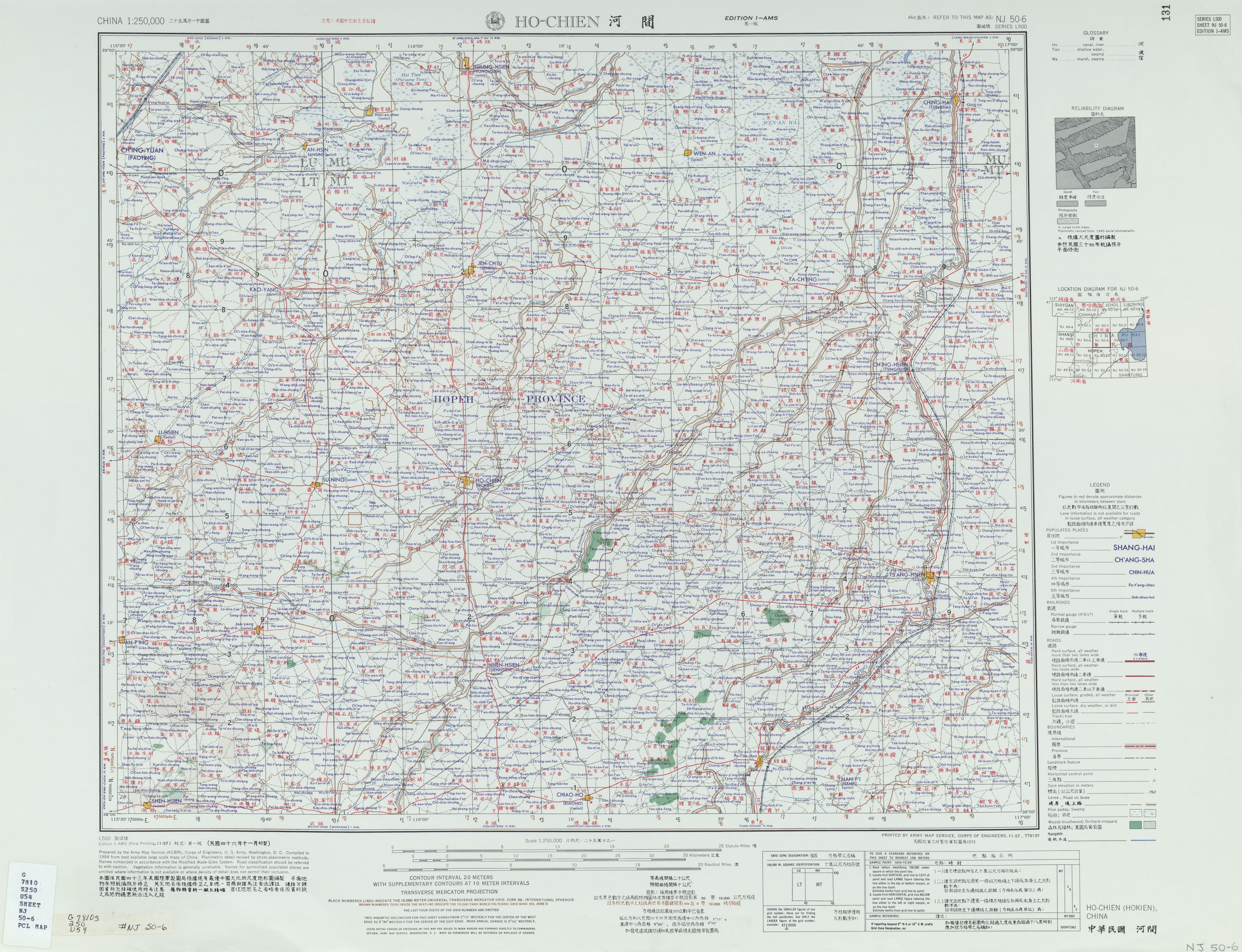
Map including Hejian (labeled as 河間 HO-CHIEN (HOKIEN) (walled)) (AMS, 1954)

Séraphin Couvreur (1835–1919) and Léon Wieger (1856–1933), two French Jesuit missionaries and renowned Sinologists worked at the Catholic Jesuit mission in Hejian.

The county contains the tomb of Chinese president Feng Guozhang.

== Administrative divisions ==
After changes in 2016, there were 2 subdistricts, 7 towns, and 11 townships:

Subdistricts:

- Yingzhoulu Subdistrict (瀛州路街道)
- Chengyuanxilu Subdistrict (城垣西路街道)

Towns:

- Migezhuang (米各庄镇)
- Jinghe (景和镇)
- Wofotang (卧佛堂镇)
- Shucheng (束城镇)
- Liugusi (留古寺镇)
- Shaheqiao (沙河桥镇)
- Shijingcun (诗经村镇)

Townships:

- Guxian (故仙乡)
- Liminju (黎民居乡)
- Xingcun (兴村乡)
- Shawa (沙洼乡)
- Xijiuji (西九吉乡)
- Beishicao (北石槽乡)
- Shicun (时村乡)
- Hangbieying (行别营乡)
- Zunzuzhuang (尊祖庄乡)
- Longhuadian (龙华店乡)
- Guoziwa Huizu Township (果子洼回族乡)

Before changes in 2016, there were 7 towns and 13 townships:

Towns:

- Yingzhou (瀛州镇)
- Migezhuang (米各庄镇)
- Jinghe (景和镇)
- Wofotang (卧佛堂镇)
- Shucheng (束城镇)
- Liugusi (留古寺镇)
- Shaheqiao (沙河桥镇)

Townships:

- Guxian (故仙乡)
- Liminju (黎民居乡)
- Xingcun (兴村乡)
- Shawa (沙洼乡)
- Xijiuji (西九吉乡)
- Beishicao (北石槽乡)
- Shijing (诗经村乡)
- Guojiacun (郭家村乡)
- Shicun (时村乡)
- Hangbieying (行别营乡)
- Zunzuzhuang (尊祖庄乡)
- Longhuadian (龙华店乡)
- Guoziwa Huizu Township (果子洼回族乡)

== Climate ==
Climate data for Hejian, elevation 11 m (36 ft), (1991–2020 normals, extremes 1981–2010)
Month	Jan	Feb	Mar	Apr	May	Jun	Jul	Aug	Sep	Oct	Nov	Dec	Year
Record high °C (°F)	16.7 (62.1)	22.8 (73.0)	31.4 (88.5)	34.0 (93.2)	39.8 (103.6)	40.5 (104.9)	42.0 (107.6)	38.0 (100.4)	35.4 (95.7)	31.4 (88.5)	24.0 (75.2)	18.7 (65.7)	42.0 (107.6)
Mean daily maximum °C (°F)	2.7 (36.9)	7.0 (44.6)	14.2 (57.6)	21.6 (70.9)	27.5 (81.5)	31.9 (89.4)	32.2 (90.0)	30.4 (86.7)	26.9 (80.4)	20.5 (68.9)	11.1 (52.0)	4.1 (39.4)	19.2 (66.5)
Daily mean °C (°F)	−3.5 (25.7)	0.4 (32.7)	7.3 (45.1)	14.7 (58.5)	20.8 (69.4)	25.5 (77.9)	27.1 (80.8)	25.4 (77.7)	20.4 (68.7)	13.4 (56.1)	4.9 (40.8)	−1.7 (28.9)	12.9 (55.2)
Mean daily minimum °C (°F)	−8.6 (16.5)	−4.9 (23.2)	1.3 (34.3)	8.3 (46.9)	14.3 (57.7)	19.6 (67.3)	22.6 (72.7)	21.2 (70.2)	15.1 (59.2)	7.6 (45.7)	−0.1 (31.8)	−6.3 (20.7)	7.5 (45.5)
Record low °C (°F)	−21.9 (−7.4)	−17.3 (0.9)	−10.2 (13.6)	−3.4 (25.9)	2.4 (36.3)	8.3 (46.9)	15.8 (60.4)	12.0 (53.6)	4.7 (40.5)	−4.0 (24.8)	−13.9 (7.0)	−20.7 (−5.3)	−21.9 (−7.4)
Average precipitation mm (inches)	1.7 (0.07)	5.4 (0.21)	8.2 (0.32)	25.8 (1.02)	35.9 (1.41)	56.5 (2.22)	149.8 (5.90)	113.6 (4.47)	42.6 (1.68)	24.5 (0.96)	12.5 (0.49)	2.8 (0.11)	479.3 (18.86)
Average precipitation days (≥ 0.1 mm)	1.2	2.0	2.7	4.8	5.3	8.0	10.9	9.7	6.2	4.6	3.4	1.8	60.6
Average snowy days	2.1	2.0	0.8	0.2	0	0	0	0	0	0	1.2	2.2	8.5
Average relative humidity (%)	58	54	50	54	58	62	76	82	76	70	67	63	64
Mean monthly sunshine hours	173.7	182.5	233.6	251.8	276.6	246.3	209.1	212.8	214.5	199.9	163.5	163.1	2,527.4
Percentage possible sunshine	57	60	63	63	62	56	47	51	58	58	55	56	57
Source: China Meteorological Administration
