= Li Tao (Five Dynasties) =

Li Tao (李濤) (c. 898?–961?), courtesy name Xinchen (信臣), formally the Duke of Ju (莒國公), was an official of the Chinese Five Dynasties and Ten Kingdoms Period Chu, Later Liang, Later Tang, Later Jin, Later Han, and Later Zhou, states, as well as the Song dynasty. He briefly served as chancellor during Later Han.

== Background ==
Assuming that Li Tao died in 961, he would be born in 898, during the reign of Emperor Zhaozong of Tang. He was from Wannian (萬年), one of the two counties making up the Tang dynasty capital Chang'an. He was a 10th-generation descendant of Li Yi (李禕), an uncle of Tang's founding emperor Emperor Gaozu and was a great-grandnephew of the Tang chancellor Li Hui. His grandfather Li Zhen (李鎮) served as a county magistrate, while his father Li Yuan (李元) served as the director of palace construction (將作監, Jiangzuo Jian). He had at least one younger brother, Li Huan (李澣), who would later be known for literary capabilities.

In 907, the major warlord Zhu Quanzhong seized the throne, ending Tang and establishing Later Liang. Li Yuan, as he was a member of Tang's imperial clan, feared that disaster would come to him, and therefore took Li Tao to the land of Later Liang's vassal state Chu to look for refuge from Chu's ruler Ma Yin. Ma commissioned Li Tao as the magistrate of Hengyang County (衡陽, in modern Hengyang, Hunan). Li Tao's cousin Li Yu (李郁) served in the Later Liang imperial guards and apparently informed Zhu about Li Yuan's and Li Tao's flight to Chu. Zhu ordered Ma to send Li Yuan and Li Tao back to Later Liang proper and made Li Tao the magistrate of Heyang County (河陽, in modern Luoyang, Henan).

== During Later Tang ==
Early in the Tiancheng era (926–930) of Later Liang's successor state Later Tang's emperor Li Siyuan, Li Tao passed the imperial examinations in the Jinshi (進士) class, and thereafter became an assistant to the prefect of Jin Prefecture (晉州, in modern Linfen, Shanxi), and later successively served as an imperial censor with the title of Jiancha Yushi (監察御史), and then You Bujue (右補闕), a consultant at the legislative bureau of government (中書省, Zhongshu Sheng). When Li Siyuan's son Li Conghou the Prince of Song was made the military governor (Jiedushi) of Tianxiong Circuit (天雄, headquartered in modern Handan, Hebei), Li Tao was made his assistant in his role as governor (觀察使, Guanchashi). After about a year of serving at Tianxiong, Li Tao was recalled to the imperial government to serve as an imperial chronicler (起居舍人, Qiju Sheren).

== During Later Jin ==
In 936, Later Tang was destroyed and succeeded by Later Jin, with Li Siyuan's son-in-law Shi Jingtang becoming emperor. In this new administration, Li Tao received the titles of Kaogong Yuanwailang (考功員外郎, a low-level official at the ministry of civil service affairs (吏部, Libu)) and editor of imperial history (史館修撰, Shiguan Xiuzhuan). In 937, when the general Zhang Congbin (張從賓) rebelled against Shi, but was then quickly defeated, one of Zhang Congbin's chief co-conspirators was Zhang Jizuo (張繼祚). When Shi was set to slaughter Zhang Jizuo's clan on account of his treason, Li cited the fact that Zhang Jizuo's father Zhang Quanyi had been a great benefactor to the people in rebuilding Luoyang to beg Shi to spare his clan; Shi agreed, and ended up limiting the executions to Zhang Jizuo's wife and children.

There was a subsequent time when Li served as an imperial emissary to Song Prefecture (宋州, in modern Shangqiu, Henan) to review the farms of the prefecture to revise the taxes to be levied there. The official Yuan Zhengci (袁正辭), who had an estate at Song, sent Li a gift of textile, trying to get Li to overlook his estate. Li instead revealed this to Shi, who honored him for his honesty. As a result, Yuan was demoted a rank, and Li was made the magistrate of Junyi County (浚儀), one of the two counties making up the Later Jin capital Kaifeng. He later was made Bibu Langzhong (比部郎中) and then Xingbu Langzhong (刑部郎中, both supervisory positions at the ministry of justice (刑部, Xingbu)), while also serving as an assistant to the director of salt and iron monopolies specifically dealing with salt monopoly.

In 941, there was an infamous incident where Zhang Yanze the military governor of Zhangyi Circuit (彰義, headquartered in modern Pingliang, Gansu) executed his secretary Zhang Shi (張式) cruelly and, after Zhang Shi's death, took Zhang Shi's wife as a concubine. After Zhang Shi's father Zhang Duo (張鐸) went to Shi Jingtang's then-location Yedu (鄴都, i.e., Tianxiong's capital) to plead to the emperor about what happened to his son, Shi removed Zhang Yanze from his post as military governor of Zhangyi. However, even though Zhang Yanze's successor Wang Zhou (王周) then reported that Zhang Yanze had committed 26 crimes at Zhangyi (in addition to what he did to Zhang Shi), Shi took no further actions against Zhang Yanze, on account of Zhang Yanze's past battlefield accomplishments and the fact that Zhang Yanze was related by marriage with the powerful general Yang Guangyuan. A number of officials, including Li, complained bitterly, going as far as to prostrate themselves in front of the palace to plead that Zhang receive the death penalty. When Shi summoned Li to his presence, Li spoke harshly in tone and words, drawing Shi's anger, and Shi ordered him to leave. Li initially did not withdraw and continued arguing, causing Shi to respond, "I already promised to Zhang Yanze that he would not die." Li responded, "Your Imperial Majesty does not want to turn against your words promising life to Zhang Yanze. But, where is Fan Yanguang's iron certificate [(i.e., promise of life)]?" (This was a reference to how Fan had rebelled against Shi but was induced into surrendering by promise of an iron certificate guaranteeing his life, but Shi had later subsequently implicitly permitted Yang to have Fan killed.) In anger, Shi walked away. Li subsequently returned to Luoyang and wrote a poem lamenting this incident.

When Shi Jingtang died later in the year and was succeeded by his adoptive son (biological nephew) Shi Chonggui, Li was accused of not visiting the emperor's casket, and was removed from his post. Soon, he was recalled to government service to serve as the magistrate of Luoyang County (the other county making up Luoyang). He then successively served as Tuntian Langzhong (屯田郎中, a supervisory official at the ministry of public works (工部, Gongbu)), and then Zhifang Langzhong (職方郎中, a supervisory official at the ministry of defense (兵部, Bingbu)), and then Zhongshu Sheren (中書舍人, a mid-level official at the legislative bureau).

== During the Liao incursion ==
Around new year 947, Later Jin was destroyed by the Khitan Liao dynasty's Emperor Taizong — with Zhang Yanze, who had surrendered to Liao, serving as Emperor Taizong's forward commander in taking Liao troops into the Later Jin capital Daliang. Zhang executed a number of Later Jin officials that he had grudges with. Li Tao, believing that he could not escape, decided to go see Zhang, sending a note requesting a meeting and stating, "Li Tao, who had requested that the Taiwei [(太尉, the title that Zhang carried in the Liao government)] be executed, is requesting an audience and asking for death." Zhang gladly received him and stated, "Are you afraid now, Sheren?" Li responded, "Tao's fear today is like the fear that Your Honor had then. If Emperor Gaozu [(i.e., Shi Jingtang)] had followed my words, how can such things happen?" Zhang laughed, drank with him, and released him.

== During Later Han ==
=== During Liu Zhiyuan's reign ===
Emperor Taizong claimed to be the emperor of China as well, but soon, there were numerous rebellions that rose against him, and he withdrew from Daliang. The most prominent of the rebels was Liu Zhiyuan, who declared himself emperor of a new state later known as Later Han at his base at Hedong Circuit (河東, headquartered in modern Taiyuan, Shanxi). When Liu approached Luoyang, Li Tao, along with the other Later Jin officials, went to Luoyang to welcome him, Liu inquired of him of the status of the imperial treasury in light of the Liao incursion. Li was able to give a detail report, and Liu was pleased by his knowledge. Once Liu entered Daliang, he made Li an imperial scholar (翰林學士, Hanlin Xueshi). (Meanwhile, Li Tao's brother Li Huan was taken to Liao proper, and later served as an imperial scholar under Emperor Taizong's nephew Emperor Shizong and son Emperor Jingzong.)

Later in 947, Liu, who had initially upon his uprising made his staff members Su Fengji and Su Yugui his chancellors, was considering naming additional chancellors. When he asked Su Fengji for recommendations, Su Fengji, who was friendly with Li, recommended Li, pointing out Li's earlier insistence for Zhang Yanze's death that Liu agreed with. At that time, it happened that Liu was facing the problem of the rebellion of Du Chongwei at Yedu, with the generals that Liu sent to attack Du, Gao Xingzhou and Murong Yanchao, having discord among themselves. Li submitted a petition asking Liu to head to Yedu to oversee the siege himself, and Liu was pleased with the proposal and found Li to be wise. Liu thereafter named both Li and Dou Zhengu chancellors with the title of Tong Zhongshu Menxia Pingzhangshi (同中書門下平章事), with Li receiving additional titles of minister of census (戶部尚書, Hubu Shangshu) and Zhongshu Shilang (中書侍郎, deputy head of the legislative bureau).

=== During Liu Chengyou's reign ===
In 948, Liu Zhiyuan died and was succeeded by his son Liu Chengyou. Early in Liu Chengyou's reign, the high-level officials were in a collective leadership, with different responsibilities. However, Yang Bin, as chief of staff (Shumishi), oversaw the government overall, and when the chancellors, led by Su Fengji, wanted to promote officials and fill unfilled positions, Yang saw the requests as wasteful and often rejected them, causing the chancellors to be displeased. In spring 948, Li Tao submitted a petition to Liu Chengyou suggesting that Yang and Guo Wei (who was then deputy chief of staff) be given military commands outside the capital and that key matters be decided by Su Fengji and Su Yugui. When Yang and Guo heard of this, they went to see Liu Chengyou's mother (Liu Zhiyuan's wife) Empress Dowager Li, stating to her, "Your subjects have followed the deceased emperor ever since difficult times. Now, the Son of Heaven is accepting other people's word and wants to send us out. Given that there are troubles west of the pass [(i.e., in the Guanzhong region, where the general Wang Jingchong was fostering a rebellion)], how can we, your subjects and ignore the affairs of the state? If we are not to remain, we hope to at least remain until the deceased emperor's burial." Empress Dowager Li was angered, and she went to Liu Chengyou, stating to him, "These are the old and accomplished subjects of the state. Why are you listening to others and expelling them?" When Liu Chengyou blamed the matter on the chancellors in general, Li Tao took the blame by himself, and was relieved of his chancellor position.

By late 950, Liu Chengyou himself had tired of the control the senior officials had on his government. He thereafter had Yang, Shi Hongzhao the commander of the imperial guards, and Wang Zhang the director of the financial agencies executed. Guo was, at that time, serving as the defender of Yedu, and therefore not killed, but Liu had Guo's family, as well as the family of Guo's assistant Wang Jun, slaughtered. When Guo thereafter rebelled and attacked Daliang, Empress Dowager Li lamented, "I did not accept Li Tao's words. Now we are facing destruction." Thereafter, Liu tried to engage Guo in battle, but was killed in battle. Guo entered Daliang and, after persuading Empress Dowager Li that he would continue to treat her as a mother, she ordered that the throne be yielded to him. Guo took the throne and established Later Zhou. (Liu Zhiyuan's younger brother Liu Chong claimed the Later Han throne at Hedong, but his state is considered by traditional historians to be a new state known as Northern Han.)

== During Later Zhou ==
Guo Wei gave Li Tao the title of Taizi Binke (太子賓客 — advisor to the Crown Prince, but completely honorary as a title as there was no crown prince at the time). In 952, Li Tao's brother Li Huan, having befriended Liao's military governor of Lulong Circuit (盧龍, headquartered in modern Beijing), Xiao Haizhen (蕭海真, a brother-in-law to Emperor Jingzong), persuaded Xiao to consider submitting to Later Zhou. Xiao agreed. Li Huan thereafter wrote Li Tao a letter outlining his plans, pointing out that Emperor Jingzong lacked experience and ambition. Li Huan proposed that the Later Zhou government either immediately attack Liao (upon which Xiao would defect, allowing Later Zhou to obtain Lulong) or seek peace (upon which Liao would agree to a long-term peace treaty). The Later Zhou government, however, was preoccupied and unable to act on Li Huan's proposal.

Later (during the reigns of Guo Wei and/or his adoptive son Guo Rong), Li Tao successively served as the minister of justice (刑部尚書, Xingbu Shangshu) and then minister of census (戶部尚書, Hubu Shangshu). In 959, when Guo Rong fell seriously ill and was considering naming additional chancellors to assist his young son Guo Zongxun, who would be succeeding him. When he inquired of this matter with the minister of defense Zhang Zhao (張昭), Zhang recommended Li Tao, arguing that both Zhang's request to execute Zhang Yanze and his request to have Yang Bin and Guo Wei relieved of their duties showed foresight proper for a chancellor. However, Guo, despite acknowledging Zhang Zhao's arguments, refused, because he considered Li Tao's disposition to be frivolous and lacking in propriety. Upon Guo Rong's death later that year, Li was made the deputy director of the emperor's funereal matters. Guo Zongxun also created Li the Duke of Ju.

== During Song ==
In 960, the major Later Zhou general Zhao Kuangyin overthrew Later Zhou and took the throne himself, establishing Song dynasty as its Emperor Taizu. In the new administration, Li Tao received the title of minister of defense (兵部尚書, Bingbu Shangshu). He fell ill in 961, when there was an incident that the army commander Yin Xun (尹勳), who was assigned to Xu Prefecture (許州, in modern Xuchang, Henan), was commanding a project to sift the Wuzhang Canal (五丈渠); the conscripted man had a night terror event, and, in the aftermaths, Yin executed more than 10 crew leaders, and captured more than 70 men who fled and cut off their left ears. When a complaint was made to the emperor that this was undue cruel punishment, Li, despite his illness, got up and wrote a petition urging for Yin to be executed to avenge the people. When Li's family members pointed out that he was ill and should rest, he responded, "Death happens to everyone, and I cannot be spared of it. I hold the authority over the army; how can I not discuss a matter where an officer killed people unduly?" When the emperor received Li's report, he was appreciative of it, but on account of Yin's bravery and past accomplishments, only rebuked him. Li died shortly after (impliedly, in 961), and was given posthumous honors. (However, the biography of his brother Li Huan indicated that Li Huan died in 962 while still in Liao service and that Li Tao published a collection of Li Huan's writings, appearing to imply that Li Tao died after Li Huan, but not explicitly stating so, although it could also be read as that Li Tao published Li Huan's works sometime before.)

== Notes and references ==
- History of Song, vol. 262.
- Zizhi Tongjian, vols. 281, 283, 285, 287, 288, 289, 290, 294.
- Xu Zizhi Tongjian, vol. 2.
