= Su Yugui =

Su Yugui (Chinese: 蘇禹珪; 895 – February 15, 956), courtesy name Yuanxi (元錫), noble title Duke of Ju (莒國公), was an official of the Later Jin, Later Han, and Later Zhou dynasties of China. He served as a chancellor in the Later Han and Later Zhou.

== Background ==
Su Yugui was born in 895, during the reign of Emperor Zhaozong of Tang. His ancestors were said to be from Wugong (武功, in modern Xianyang, Shaanxi), but for several generations had lived in Gaomi (高密, in modern Weifang, Shandong). His father Su Zhongrong (蘇仲榮) was known for being well-learned in Confucianism in their home territory. At one point, Su Zhongrong passed the imperial examination in the Mingjing (明經) class, and was made an assistant professor at the imperial university; he later served as the magistrate of Futang County (輔唐, in modern Weifang).

Su Yugui himself was said to be humble and peaceful, taking after his father in studies. He, like his father, passed the Mingjing examinations, and was thereafter made a staff member of the prefect of Liao Prefecture (遼州, in modern Jinzhong, Shanxi). (It is unclear when this occurred, but it must have occurred after the fall of Tang's successor state Later Liang, as during Later Liang, Liao Prefecture belonged to Later Liang's rival Jin; it thus occurred either during Later Tang or Later Jin.) He later served successively as secretary to the military governors (Jiedushi) of Pinglu (平盧, headquartered in modern Weifang) and Tianping (天平, headquartered in modern Tai'an, Shandong) Circuits, and then as the treasurers of Zhaoyi (昭義, headquartered in modern Changzhi, Shanxi) and Hedong (河東, headquartered in modern Taiyuan, Shanxi) Circuits. After the major Later Jin general Liu Zhiyuan was made the military governor of Hedong in 941, he made Su his assistant in his role as governor (觀察使, Guanchashi) of Hedong.

== During Later Han ==
=== During Liu Zhiyuan's reign ===
In 947, Later Jin was destroyed by its northern neighbor Liao (Khitan), and Liao's Emperor Taizong claimed to be the emperor of China as well. Liu Zhiyuan initially postured as if he were going to submit to Liao, but soon declared himself emperor (of an initially unnamed state, but later known as Later Han). He made Su Yugui and another assistant, Su Fengji, chancellors, both with the titles of Zhongshu Shilang (中書侍郎) and Tong Zhongshu Menxia Pingzhangshi (同中書門下平章事). After Liu was subsequently able to take over the Central Plains, Su Yugui received the additional title of minister of justice (刑部尚書, Xingbu Shangshu). As Liao's Emperor Taizong had taken the Later Jin chancellors Feng Dao and Li Song north, Liu awarded Feng's mansion to Su Yugui and Li's mansion to Su Fengji. It was said that Su Fengji and Su Yugui were deeply trusted by the emperor, such that no one could alienate him from them; he entrusted them with all governmental matters, while entrusting all military matters to Yang Bin and Guo Wei. At Su Fengji's recommendations, Liu made Li Tao, as well as Dou Zhengu, chancellors as well, joining the Sus, in fall 947, as he was set to join the generals Gao Xingzhou and Murong Yanchao (Liu's half-brother) against the rebellious general Du Chongwei. At that time, Su Yugui received the title of You Pushe (右僕射).

=== During Liu Chengyou's reign ===
Liu Zhiyuan died in spring 948, and was succeeded by his young son Liu Chengyou, whom he entrusted to Su Fengji, Yang Bin, Shi Hongzhao, and Guo Wei. Early in Liu Chengyou's reign, the high-level officials were in a collective leadership, with different responsibilities. However, Yang Bin, as chief of staff (Shumishi), oversaw the government overall, and when the chancellors, led by Su Fengji, wanted to promote officials and fill unfilled positions, Yang saw the requests as wasteful and often rejected them, causing the chancellors to be displeased In spring 948, Li Tao submitted a petition to Liu Chengyou suggesting that Yang and Guo Wei (who was then deputy chief of staff) be given military commands outside the capital and that key matters be decided by Su Fengji and Su Yugui. When Yang and Guo heard of this, they went to see Liu Chengyou's mother (Liu Zhiyuan's wife) Empress Dowager Li, stating to her, "Your subjects have followed the deceased emperor ever since difficult times. Now, the Son of Heaven is accepting other people's word and wants to send us out. Given that there are troubles west of the pass [(i.e., in the Guanzhong region, where the general Wang Jingchong was fostering a rebellion)], how can we, your subjects and ignore the affairs of the state? If we are not to remain, we hope to at least remain until the deceased emperor's burial." Empress Dowager Li was angered, and she went to Liu Chengyou, stating to him, "These are the old and accomplished subjects of the state. Why are you listening to others and expelling them?" When Liu Chengyou blamed the matter on the chancellors in general, Li Tao took the blame by himself, and was relieved of his chancellor position. Subsequently, Yang was given an additional chancellor position, while Guo was made co-chief of staff, such that Yang became the main decision-maker, with the two Su chancellors (along with the other chancellor Dou Zhengu) no longer having real chancellor authority.

In 949, after Guo suppressed the rebellion of the general Li Shouzhen, Guo declined to be honored alone for his achievements, and therefore all of the high-level officials were honored. In Su Yugui's case, he was given the title Zuo Pushe (左僕射).

By winter 950, Liu Chengyou had tired of the control the senior officials had on his government, even though, under Yang's leadership, the imperial government was considered well-run, and Shi's overseeing of the capital made it safe for the public. Part of the friction came from how his close associates and relatives of the empress dowager were trying to gain power, but were being thwarted by Yang and Shi. At that time, Empress Dowager Li's younger brother Li Ye (李業) was serving as the director of miscellaneous affairs (武德使, Wudeshi) inside the palace, but wanted to be promoted to the higher position of director of palace affairs, a desire that Liu Chengyou and Empress Dowager Li were both in concurrence with, but Yang and Shi considered inappropriate as he lacked the seniority, so they stopped his commission. Further, Hou Kuangzan (後匡贊) the director of imperial stables, Guo Yunming (郭允明) the director of tea and wine, and Nie Wenjin (聶文進) the liaison officer at the office of the chiefs of staff, were all favored by Liu Chengyou, but had long not been promoted, causing them to be resentful. When Liu Chengyou wanted to make his favorite concubine Consort Geng empress, Yang considered it too quick after the expiration of his morning period for Liu Zhiyuan, and so opposed it. When Consort Geng died, Yang opposed Liu Chengyou's wishes to have her buried with the ceremonies due an empress. Further, there was an occasion when Yang and Shi were discussing state matters with Liu Chengyou, Liu Chengyou made the comment, "Be careful! Do not let others get a chance to criticize you!" Yang responded, "Your Imperial Majesty should just be quiet. Your subjects are still here." This led to Liu Chengyou's resentment toward them, and his close associates thereafter falsely accused Yang and the others of plotting against him. As Su resented Shi, he also incited Li Ye and the others.

Liu Chengyou, thereafter, plotted with Li Ye, Nie, Hou, and Guo Yunming to kill Yang and the others. Liu Chengyou reported his plans to Empress Dowager Li, who responded, "How can such things be easily considered! You should discuss with the chancellors further." However, Li Ye then stated, "The deceased Emperor had said before that the matters of the state should not be discussed with scholars. Their timidity will ruin you." When Empress Dowager Li tried to speak again, Liu Chengyou responded angrily, "The matters of state cannot be decided in the halls of a woman!"

On December 24, 950, as the officials were arriving at the palace for the imperial gathering, a number of soldiers appeared and killed Yang, Shi, and Wang Zhang. Subsequently, Liu Chengyou declared that they had committed treason, and stated to the chancellors and the other officials, "Yang Bin and the others viewed us as a young child. We finally now get to be your true lord. You should not worry!" He sent soldiers to arrest and kill the relatives and close associates of Yang, Shi, and Wang.

As part of the post-slaughter moves, Liu Chengyou also had the families of Guo Wei and Guo's assistant Wang Jun slaughtered, and he also sent emissaries to order the executions of Guo and Wang Jun. The emissaries were arrested and turned over to Guo, however, by Empress Dowager Li's brother Li Hongyi (李洪義). Guo thereafter rebelled and marched on Daliang. Li Ye wanted to empty out of the imperial treasury to award the imperial army with money (to try to ensure their faithfulness), and when Su Yugui initially opposed, Li Ye bowed down to him, stating, "Lord Chancellor, for the sake of the Son of Heaven, please do not be concerned about the treasury!" The soldiers were rewarded thereafter. Meanwhile, Liu Chengyou, against Empress Dowager Li's advice, went out of the capital to try to encourage the imperial troops (which he put Murong Yanchao in charge of) in opposition to Guo, with the three chancellors (Su Fengji, Su Yugui, and Dou) accompanying him. After Guo's troops defeated the imperial troops, Murong fled, and the imperial troops collapsed. Liu Chengyou was killed in the confusion, and Su Fengji, Yan, and Guo Yunming committed suicide. Su Yugui and Dou fled back to Daliang, and Su Yugui initially hid but was arrested by Guo's soldiers. Guo personally met Su Yugui and Dou and comforted them, returning them to their chancellor positions.

Guo, in the aftermaths, initially consulted with Empress Dowager Li and postured to make Liu Chengyou's adoptive brother (biological cousin) Liu Yun, then the military governor of Wuning Circuit (武寧, headquartered in modern Xuzhou, Jiangsu), emperor. While Liu Yun was on the way from Wuning's capital Xu Prefecture (徐州) to Daliang, however, there were reports of a major Liao incursion. Empress Dowager Li sent Guo to resist it, leaving affairs of the government to Dou, Su, and Wang Jun, and military matters to Wang Yin (王殷), although Su was subsequently sent to Song Prefecture (宋州, in modern Shangqiu, Henan) to welcome Liu Yun. Soon, while Guo was away from Daliang, his soldiers rose to support him as the new emperor, and he returned to Daliang to seize the throne, establishing the new state of Later Zhou.

== During Later Zhou ==
As emperor, Guo Wei retained Dou Zhengu and Su Yugui as chancellors, and gave Su the additional honorific title of Sikong (司空, one of the Three Excellencies), but added Wang Jun as a chancellor. Not long after, though, he relieved Dou and Su of their chancellor positions, with Su remaining only as Sikong (with Fan Zhi and Li Gu made chancellors in their stead). After Guo's death and succession by his adoptive son Guo Rong, Guo Rong created Su the Duke of Ju. Not long after, Su retired from governmental service. On Chinese New Year of 956, when Su was eating with a guest, he suddenly died.

== Notes and references ==
- Old History of the Five Dynasties, vol. 127.
- Zizhi Tongjian, vols. 286, 287, 288, 289, 290.
