= Empress Li (Later Han) =

Empress Li (李皇后, personal name unknown) (died 954), known as Empress Dowager Zhaosheng (昭聖太后) during Later Zhou, was an empress of the Chinese Five Dynasties and Ten Kingdoms Period state Later Han. She was the wife of Later Han's founder Liu Zhiyuan (Emperor Gaozu) and the mother of its second emperor Liu Chengyou (Emperor Yin). She served as regent in the interregnum of 951, after the death of her son until the installation of his successor.

== Background ==
It is not known when the future Empress Li was born, but it is known that she was from Jinyang (晉陽, i.e., Taiyuan) and that her father was a farmer. Her future husband Liu Zhiyuan was then a soldier in the army of Jin, which had its capital at Taiyuan, and one night, when he was out letting his horses graze, he intruded into her house, seized her, and made her his wife. Of his three sons — Liu Chengxùn (劉承訓), Liu Chengyou, and Liu Chengxūn (劉承勳, note different tone than his brother) — it is known that Liu Chengyou was born of her, but it is not known whether Liu Chengxùn or Liu Chengxūn was. After Liu Zhiyuan became a prominent general during Later Jin, she was given the title of Lady of Wei. She had six brothers, of whom Li Hongjian (李洪建), Li Hongyi (李洪義), and Li Ye (李業) were known in history and all of whom were younger. The oldest brother was named Li Hongxin (李洪信), and it is not known whether he was older or younger than she.

== During Later Han ==
=== During Liu Zhiyuan's reign ===
In 947, Later Jin fell to an invasion by the Khitan Liao dynasty. Liao's Emperor Taizong declared himself the emperor of central China as well, and Liu Zhiyuan, then the military governor (Jiedushi) of Hedong Circuit (河東, headquartered in Taiyuan), after some initial hesitations, rose in resistance against Liao, declaring himself emperor. (He initially did not declare a name for his state, but the state later became known as Later Han.) To fund his resistance of Liao, he considered forcibly borrowing money from the general populace so that he could give the money as reward to the soldiers. Lady Li opposed, stating:

Your Imperial Majesty is using Hedong to build your great state. But even before you shower the people with your grace, you would be robbing them of the capital they need to live on. This is not what a new Son of Heaven should be doing in his intent to save the people. Please empty out all that we have in the palace to give to the army. Even though it would not be much, no one will complain.

Liu accepted her suggestion and cancelled the plan to forcibly borrow money. He gave out what was stored in the personal headquarters, and when the news spread, the people were impressed, both at Hedong and elsewhere. Shortly after, he created her empress.

Liu was able to unite the people rising against Liao rule under his authority, and his Later Han state was able to take over central China, with Kaifeng serving as its capital. However, he ruled only a year before he died in spring 848. Liu Chengxùn predeceased him, so Liu Chengyou became the new emperor. Liu Chengyou honored Empress Li as empress dowager. Per Liu Zhiyuan's directions, the authority over the imperial government largely rested in the hands of several generals and officials — Su Fengji, Yang Bin, Shi Hongzhao, and Guo Wei.

=== During Liu Chengyou's reign ===
However, soon a dispute arose between Su Fengji, who was then the leading chancellor and Yang Bin, over the fact that Su was filling many official positions that had long been left open, but Yang, who was then one of the chiefs of staff (Shumishi), believed that these were unnecessary positions that were waste of government resources, and therefore often criticized Su's requests. Another chancellor, Li Tao, submitted a petition to Liu Chengyou, arguing that Yang and Guo, who was also serving as Yang's deputy, should be relieved of their positions and made military governors of key circuits, while the chief of staff positions should be entrusted to Su Fengji and Su Yugui. When Yang and Guo became aware of Li Tao's petition, they went to Empress Dowager Li and stated to her, weepingly:

"Your subjects have followed the deceased emperor ever since difficult times. Now, the Son of Heaven is accepting other people's word and wants to send us out. Given that there are troubles west of the pass [i.e., in the Guanzhong region, where the general Wang Jingchong was fostering a rebellion], how can we, your subjects and ignore the affairs of the state? If we are not to remain, we hope to at least remain until the deceased emperor's burial."

Empress Dowager Li was angered, and she went to Liu Chengyou, stating to him,

"These are the old and accomplished subjects of the state. Why are you listening to others and expelling them?"

When Liu Chengyou blamed the matter on the chancellors in general, Li Tao took the blame by himself, and was relieved of his chancellor position. Subsequently, Yang was given an additional chancellor position, while Guo was made co-chief of staff, such that Yang became the main decision-maker, with the two Su chancellors (along with the other chancellor Dou Zhengu) no longer having real chancellor authority.

With Wang Jingchong soon rising in rebellion at Fengxiang Circuit (鳳翔, headquartered in modern Baoji, Shaanxi) in alliance with Li Shouzhen the military governor of Huguo Circuit (護國, headquartered in modern Yuncheng, Shanxi) and Zhao Siwan (趙思綰), an officer who then controlled Yongxing Circuit (永興, headquartered in modern Xi'an, Shaanxi), Guo was sent against Li Shouzhen. Guo defeated Li Shouzhen in 849, and Li committed suicide, as did Wang. Zhao surrendered, but then considered rebelling again, and was executed. With the three rebels defeated, it was said that Liu Chengyou became arrogant and frivolous, spending much time with his favorite attendants Hou Kuangzan (後匡贊) and Guo Yunming (郭允明). Empress Dowager Li frequently tried to correct his ways, but he did not listen to her.

=== Adulthood of Liu Chengyou ===
By winter 950, Liu Chengyou, growing into adulthood, had tired of the control that the key officials that Liu Zhiyuan left had. (At that time, Yang oversaw the operations of the government; Guo oversaw the military; Shi Hongzhao oversaw the imperial guards; and Wang Zhang oversaw the financial matters.) At that time, Liu Chengyou's favorite attendants were trying to assert authority, and Empress Dowager Li's relatives were also trying to be involved in government, but Yang curbed these attempts. Empress Dowager Li's younger brother Li Ye, in particular, who had been serving as the director of miscellaneous affairs (武德使, Wudeshi) inside the palace, was hoping to become the director of palace affairs (宣徽使), and both the emperor and the empress dowager were in favor, but Yang and Shi decided against it, believing that it was improper to promote Li Ye. Yang and Shi further angered the emperor by telling him to simply be silent. Liu Chengyou thus plotted with Li Ye, Nie Wenjin (聶文進), Hou, and Guo Yunming, to kill Yang, Shi, and Wang. Liu Chengyou reported his plans to Empress Dowager Li, who responded,

"How can such things be easily considered! You should discuss with the chancellors further."

Li Ye, however, again spoke in favor, and when Empress Dowager Li again tried to speak, Liu Chengyou responded angrily,

"The matters of state cannot be decided in the halls of a woman!"

Shortly after, under Liu Chengyou's orders, the imperial guard soldiers killed Yang, Shi, and Wang near the palace as they were coming to the palace for an imperial gathering. Liu Chengyou further sent out orders to have Guo Wei, who was then serving as the military governor of Tianxiong Circuit (天雄, headquartered in modern Handan, Hebei), Guo's army monitor Wang Jun, and Shi's favored imperial guard general Wang Yin (王殷), then stationed at Chan Prefecture (澶州, in modern Puyang, Henan), killed. However, when the orders leaked, the generals to whom the orders were issued refused to carry out the orders. However, Guo's and Wang Jun's families remaining at Kaifeng were slaughtered. Guo thereafter rose in rebellion and headed south toward Kaifeng. (Empress Dowager Li's brother Li Hongyi, then the military governor of Zhenning Circuit (鎮寧, headquartered at Chan) joined Guo's rebellion, while Li Hongjian, then an imperial guard general, was on the side of Li Ye, but when Li Ye ordered him to slaughter Wang Yin's family (as Guo's and Wang Jun's were by the general Liu Zhu (劉銖)), Li Hongjian refused, and merely put Wang Yin's family members under house arrest.))

Guo's army soon approached Kaifeng. Liu Chengyou responded with an army of his own, with Liu Zhiyuan's half-brother Murong Yanchao in command. Empress Dowager Li tried to dissuade Liu Chengyou from going himself, instead hoping that some form of rapprochement could still be reached with Guo, but he did not listen to her. When the armies engaged, Guo's army defeated the emperor's, which scattered, and Murong fled back to his own circuit (Taining (泰寧, headquartered in modern Jining, Shandong)). Liu Chengyou was essentially left alone with his close attendants, and in the subsequent confusion, he was killed by soldiers. Guo subsequently entered the capital.

=== Regency ===
Guo Wei and his soldiers effectively controlled the capital, but for some time, there was still an appearance that normal governance could be returning. Guo led the officials in paying homage to Empress Dowager Li and formally requested her to name a new emperor. She initially issued an edict asking the officials to select an emperor among Liu Zhiyuan's brother Liu Chong the military governor of Hedong, cousin Liu Xin (劉信) the military governor of Zhongwu Circuit (忠武, headquartered in modern Xuchang, Henan), and sons Liu Chengxūn (then the mayor of Kaifeng) and Liu Yun the military governor of Wuning Circuit (武寧, headquartered in modern Xuzhou, Jiangsu).

Guo and Wang Jun initially wanted Liu Chengxūn to be named emperor, but Empress Dowager Li revealed to them privately, and later, when needed to, publicly, that Liu Chengxūn had been so ill that he was constantly bedridden, so instead, they asked for Liu Yun to be named emperor. Under Guo's suggestion, the senior official Feng Dao, along with other officials Wang Du (王度) and Zhao Shangjiao (趙上交), were sent to Wuning's capital Xu Prefecture (徐州) to welcome Liu Yun to the capital. For the time being, the empress dowager served as the regent for the state, and it was to her that all important state businesses were submitted for decision. Her brother Li Hongjian was among the conspirators who were executed, while Li Ye initially fled to Li Hongxin, who was then military governor of Baoyi Circuit (保義, headquartered in modern Sanmenxia, Henan), but after Li Hongxin refused to shelter him, was killed in flight.

Shortly after, news came that there was a Liao incursion. Empress Dowager Li ordered Guo to lead an army to resist it, while authorizing Dou Zhengu, Su Yugui, and Wang Jun to oversee affairs of state, and Wang Yin to oversee military matters. However, when Guo reached Chan, his army generals rose and wanted him to take the throne. They robed him in a yellow flag (as a yellow robe was what the emperor would wear). Guo then advanced south back toward the capital. As he approached the capital, he submitted a note to Empress Dowager Li, promising to continue to serve her as if she were his mother. Guo soon entered the capital and was welcomed by the officials. Empress Dowager Li soon issued edicts deposing Liu Yun and making Guo regent, while the military governors displayed support for Guo. On Lunar New Year 951, she issued an edict passing the throne to Guo, who took the throne, establishing Later Zhou. Liu Chong shortly after claimed the Han throne at Hedong, but his state was typically viewed by historians not as a continuation of the Later Han state, but as a splinter state known as Northern Han.

== During Later Zhou ==
After the establishment of Later Zhou, Empress Dowager Li moved to the western palace. Guo Wei honored her with the title "Empress Dowager Zhaosheng." She died in 954, shortly after Guo's death and succession by his adoptive son Guo Rong.

== Notes and references ==
- Old History of the Five Dynasties, vol. 104.
- New History of the Five Dynasties, vol. 18.
- Zizhi Tongjian, vols. 286, 287, 288, 289, 290, 291.

Preceded by None (dynasty founded)	Empress of Later/Northern Han; 947–948	Succeeded by Liu Chong's empress
Preceded by Empress Feng of Later Jin	Empress of China (Central Shanxi); 947–948	Succeeded by Liu Chong's empress
Preceded by Empress Feng of Later Jin	Empress of China (Central); 947–948	Succeeded by Empress Fu of Later Zhou
