= Li Gu (Later Zhou) =

- Traditional Chinese: 李穀
- Simplified Chinese: 李谷
Transcriptions
Standard Mandarin
- Hanyu Pinyin: Lǐ Gǔ
- Wade–Giles: Li Ku

Courtesy name Li Weizhen
- Chinese: 李惟珍
Transcriptions
Standard Mandarin
- Hanyu Pinyin: Lǐ Wéizhēn
- Wade–Giles: Li Wei-chên

Title Duke of Zhao
- Traditional Chinese: 趙公
- Simplified Chinese: 赵公
- Literal meaning: Elder of Zhao
Transcriptions
Standard Mandarin
- Hanyu Pinyin: Zhàogōng
- Wade–Giles: Chao-kung

Li Gu (903–12 August 960), courtesy name Weizhen, titled Duke of Zhao, was an official of the Later Tang, Later Jin, Later Han, and Later Zhou, Liao, and Northern Song dynasties of China. He served as a chancellor under the Later Zhou dynasty.

== Life ==
=== Early years ===
Li Gu was born in 903, late in the Tang dynasty. He was said to be from Ruyin (汝陰) in modern Fuyang, Anhui. He was tall and handsome, and in his youth wanted to be a fighter for justice but was restricted by the people of his home territory. He thus resolved to study hard, and he became learned.

=== Later Tang ===
In 929, during the reign of the Later Tang emperor Li Siyuan, Li Gu passed the imperial examinations in the jinshi class. He subsequently successively served as a secretary to the prefects of Hua (華州) around modern Weinan, Shaanxi, and Tai (泰州) around modern Yuncheng, Shanxi. Some records give him the title of jinshi in 926 as he was recorded to have helped a friend, Han Xizai, in fleeing to Later Tang's southeastern neighbor Wu that year after Han's father was caught up in a rebellion and executed. It was said that Li accompanied Han to the two states' border post Zhengyang (正陽) between modern Fuyang and Lu'an, Anhui, on the Huai River, to send him off. They drank together before parting with each other. At that time, Han made the comment, "If Wu makes me a chancellor, I will surely invade and conquer the Central Plains." Li laughed and responded, "If the Central Plains makes me a chancellor, for me to take Wu would be as easy as taking something out of a sack." Han then entered Wu realm.

=== Later Jin ===
During the subsequent Later Jin, Li Gu became an imperial censor with the title of jiancha yushi (監察御史). When Shi Chonggui, the nephew of the founding emperor Shi Jingtang (Li Siyuan's son-in-law), served as the mayor of the capital at modern Kaifeng, Li Gu served as an assistant to him, as well as taichang cheng (太常丞), the secretary general of the Ministry of Rites. Shi Chonggui became the mayor of Kaifeng in 938, so this would have been in 938 or shortly after. Subsequently, when Shi Jingtang himself took up residence at Yedu (鄴都) in modern Handan, Hebei, for some time and left Shi Chonggui in charge at Kaifeng, Li Gu was given the additional title of yubu yuanwailang (虞部員外郎), a low-level official at the Ministry of Public Works. Shi Jingtang took up residence at Yedu in 941 in response to the expected rebellion of the general An Chongrong, so this would have been in 941 or shortly after. When Shi Chonggui was subsequently made the mayor of Guangjin (廣晉), i.e. Yedu, Li followed him to Guangjin and continued to serve as his assistant.

In 942, Shi Jingtang died and Shi Chonggui succeeded him as emperor. He made Li zhifang langzhong (職方郎中), a supervisory official at the Ministry of Personnel. Shortly after, Li was made libu langzhong (吏部郎中), also a supervisory official at the Ministry of Personnel, as well as secretary at the treasury (度支判官, dùzhī pànguān). At some point, for reasons lost to history, Li was removed from his offices. In 944, when Shi Chonggui personally led a campaign against Later Jin's northern neighbor the Khitan Empire, he issued an edict asking Li to accompany him on the campaign, and he made Li an imperial scholar at the office of the chief of staff (樞密直學士, shumi zhi xueshi), as well as imperial attendant (給事中, jishizhong). However, Li was disliked by Shi Chonggui's close associates Feng Yu and Li Yantao (李彥韜). When Shi Chonggui later led another campaign against the Khitans, Li Gu was made the deputy director of the three financial ministries overseeing the treasury, taxation, and the salt and iron monopolies.

In fall 945, Li Gu was made the prefect of Ci Prefecture (磁州) in modern Handan, and the director of military supplies for the army in the north (i.e. the army against the Khitans). In 946, Shi Chonggui commissioned the generals Du Wei and Li Shouzhen to command a major campaign against Khitan. Li Gu, apparently accompanying the army, suggested to the generals that they attack the main Khitan force which was then besieging Later Jin's Hengzhou (now Zhengding in Shijiazhuang Prefecture, Hebei) before the Khitan army could be prepared for the Later Jin army. Du and Li Shouzhen, however, did not listen to him, and instead sent him away to requisition supplies from Huai Prefecture (懷州) in modern Jiaozuo, Henan, and Meng Prefecture (孟州) in modern Luoyang, Henan. Li Gu believed that Du and Li Shouzhen were about to lead the Later Jin army into a major disaster as the Khitan army, realizing the Later Jin army was approaching, was beginning to cut off its supply routes. He secretly submitted a petition to Shi Chonggui, urging him to quickly head to the front line himself with the generals Gao Xingzhou and Fu Yanqing, but the petition either did not reach Shi or was not heeded. When the Khitan army subsequently surrounded the Later Jin army, Du and Li Shouzhen surrendered to the Khitan emperor Taizong. Emperor Taizong then quickly headed toward the effectively undefended Kaifeng, forcing Shi to surrender and ending Later Jin.

=== Liao ===
The Khitan emperor entered Kaifeng and renamed his state the Liao dynasty, taking on ceremonial Han clothing and apparently intending to directly rule his Khitan and Chinese lands together. He sent Shi Chonggui and his family in exile to the Khitan lands in the north. The former Later Jin emperor's train was not well-supplied, but his former subjects did not dare to provide supplies. However, when Shi's train went through Ci Prefecture, Li Gu greeted him on the way and they both wept. Li stated, "Your subject had no excuse for failing Your Imperial Majesty." He gave what he had to Shi and sent Shi back on his way north.

Most Later Jin officials submitted to the Liao emperor at least nominally, but Liu Zhiyuan, the military governor of Hedong (河東) around modern Taiyuan, Shanxi, and one of its strongest generals, initially pretended to submit to Liao but then declared himself the emperor of a new dynasty, Later Han. Li secretly allied himself to Liu, putting his prefecture's resources at his disposal. He encouraged Liu to have the bandit leader Liang Hui (梁暉), who had likewise submitted to Later Han, attack nearby Xiangzhou (相州), also within modern Handan. Liu agreed and Liang attacked and captured Xiangzhou. Subsequently, the Liao emperor attacked Xiangzhou, killed Liang, and slaughtered the city's inhabitants. Under the belief that Li had secretly submitted to Later Han, he had Li arrested and accused him of treason, but Li denied the allegations. The Liao emperor pretended to be holding letters that he had intercepted between Li and the Later Han emperor, but Li, seeing through the trick, stated, "If this is real, please show me the evidence." The Liao emperor interrogated him six times, but was unable to get him to admit that he had submitted to Later Han. As Khitan law dictated that a person who had not admitted his crimes could not be put to death, Li was spared and released. During an illness, the Liao emperor then stated to Li, "When I advanced south, I was told by others that you said that I will surely be unable to return north. What magic do you have that you were able to tell this? Now I am very ill. If you can save me, you will be rich and powerful." Li responded, "I have no magic. It is merely other people who want to harm me who spread this lie."

As rebellions against Liao rule multiplied, Emperor Taizong resolved to leave Kaifeng and return north to Khitan lands. He died on the way, however, while near Heng Prefecture. The main Khitan army entered Hengzhou to consider their next step. The Han Chinese general Zhao Yanshou—to whom Emperor Taizong had initially promised the Chinese throne before reneging on the offer—wanted to declare himself regent, but the Khitan princes resolved to declare Emperor Taizong's nephew Yelü Ruan, the Prince of Yongkang, the new emperor (posthumously remembered as Emperor Shizong). Yelü Ruan subsequently imprisoned Zhao. Faced with a challenge to his succession from his grandmother, the Empress Dowager Shulü, who wanted to make his uncle the Crown Prince Yelü Lihu emperor instead, he took his army and advanced north to face her army, leaving the general Mada (麻荅) in charge at Hengzhou. He left the vast majority of former Later Jin officials, whom Emperor Taizong had taken with him on his trek back north, at Hengzhou, a group including Li Gu.

By this point, Liu Zhiyuan had entered Kaifeng. Hearing that news, the Han soldiers in the Liao army at Hengzhou rose against the Khitans under the leadership of the officers Li Rong and Bai Zairong (白再榮). The Han and Khitan soldiers battled within the city walls and, initially, the battle was going badly against the Han Chinese soldiers. Li Gu, wanting to encourage the Han, asked the three senior Later Jin chancellors Feng Dao, Li Song, and He Ning to visit the battle to encourage the soldiers. When the soldiers saw the three senior chancellors, they were encouraged and fought harder, eventually expelling the Khitans from the city. Subsequently, the soldiers supported Bai to be the acting military governor of Chengde, so that he could submit to Later Han and seek aid. Meanwhile, Bai, who was greedy, wanted to kill Li Song and He Ning to seize their wealth. Li Gu rebuked him, pointing out that, if he did so, the new Later Han emperor would surely have him punished. Bai refrained. Li Gu then also dissuaded Bai from seizing the wealth of the people of Heng Prefecture to distribute to his soldiers.

=== Later Han ===
Li Gu was subsequently recalled to the Later Han imperial government and promoted to Zuo Sanqi Changshi (左散騎常侍), a high-level consultant at the examination bureau of government (門下省, Menxia Sheng). He was shortly after made the acting mayor of Kaifeng. And that time, there was much banditry in the region, particularly most serious at Zhongmou (中牟, in modern Zhengzhou, Henan). Li had known of a capable old administrator from Later Liang (which existed between Tang and Later Tang), Liu Deyu (劉德輿), who had retired and taken up residence at Zhongmou. He made Liu the secretary general at the Zhongmou County government, and sent several thousand imperial guard soldiers to serve under Liu. They captured the bandits, finding out that their leaders included a county administrator and an administrator at the Office of the Imperial Censors (御史臺, Yushi Tai) — apparently explaining why the banditry went unabated earlier — and recovering much of the wealth the bandits had taken earlier. From that point on, the travelers could go through Zhongmou without trouble. Shortly after, Li was made the deputy minister of public works (工部侍郎, Gongbu Shilang).

In 948, by which time Liu Zhiyuan's son and successor Liu Chengyou was emperor, there were three rebellions that rose simultaneously in the west — with Li Shouzhen, then the military governor of Huguo Circuit (護國, headquartered in modern Yuncheng), who declared himself the Prince of Liang, being the overall leader. (The other two rebel leaders were Wang Jingchong the military governor of Fengxiang Circuit (鳳翔, headquartered in modern Baoji, Shaanxi), and the officer Zhao Siwan, who occupied Yongxing Circuit (永興, headquartered in modern Xi'an, Shaanxi).) The Later Han imperial government sent the major general Guo Wei against the rebels. As part of the operations, Li Gu was put in charge of supplying Guo's army. At that time, the collective leadership at the Later Han imperial government (put in place by Liu Zhiyuan as Liu Chengyou was still young and unable to oversee governance himself) was considered chaotic, and Guo was respected by the people. He secretly talked with Li Gu about that, but Li Gu did not encourage him to have further ambitions, but rather only encouraged him to be faithful. This disappointed Guo but drew Guo's respect for him. After Guo successfully defeated the rebels, Li Gu was made the prefect of Chen Prefecture (陳州, in modern Zhoukou, Henan).

As Liu Chengyou grew in age, he resented the officials that Liu Zhiyuan left in control of the imperial government, believing that they were stopping him from truly governing the state. In 950, he ambushed three of them — the chief of staff Yang Bin, the commander of the imperial guards Shi Hongzhao, and the director of the financial agencies Wang Zhang — and killed them and their families. As he believed that Guo was part of this group of officials who restrained him, he also sent orders to Li Hongyi (李弘義) the military governor of Zhenning Circuit (鎮寧, headquartered in modern Puyang, Henan), to have Guo, who was then serving as the defender of Yedu, killed as well, and slaughtered Guo's family members at the capital Kaifeng. He summoned a group of generals and officials who were then not at the capital to the capital, apparently intending to have them take over the positions vacated by the officials he killed. Li was among this group of officials that he summoned, but it was unclear whether Li actually joined the imperial government at this point. Meanwhile, Li Hongyi, concerned that Guo was already aware of the order, did not carry it out, and put Liu Chengyou's messenger under arrest, and then revealed everything to Guo. Guo thereafter rebelled and attacked Kaifeng, defeating the imperial army that Liu Chengyou commanded himself; Liu Chengyou was killed in battle. Guo entered the capital, and initially honored Liu Chengyou's mother Empress Dowager Li as regent while he ostensibly searched for a proper successor to the Later Han throne. During this transition period, Li Gu was made the acting director of the financial agencies (treasury, taxation, and salt and iron monopolies). Shortly after, though, Guo's soldiers supported him to be emperor, and he subsequently extracted Empress Dowager Li's agreement by promising to continue to honor her as a mother. In spring 951, Empress Dowager Li declared him emperor, and he took the throne as the new emperor of a new Later Zhou.

=== Later Zhou ===
After Guo Wei took the throne, he gave Li Gu, who was then referred to as the deputy minister of census (戶部侍郎, Hubu Shilang) in addition to being the acting director of the financial agencies, the title of Zhongshu Shilang (中書侍郎, deputy head of the legislative bureau) and gave him the designation of Tong Zhongshu Menxia Pingzhangshi (同中書門下平章事), making Li a chancellor, along with Wang Jun and Fan Zhi; Li continued to serve as the acting director of the financial agencies. The people and officials of Chen Prefecture, apparently wanting to ingratiate the new chancellor, requested that a temple be built for him even though he was still living; Li declined earnestly, and Guo agreed with him.

As chancellor, Li was said to be silent, resolute, and full of strategies. He spoke convincingly before the emperor on important matters, and was often able to persuade the emperor by using analogies. The previous laws (inherited from Later Han) forbid the common people from using cowhide for their own purposes (because the cowhides were needed for military purposes), and the laws were so harsh that violators were put to death. Li effectuated a change in the laws such that only a portion, truly needed for military use, would be set aside, while the rest could be used by civilians. He also ended the practice of conscripting the people for farm labor far away from home, requiring only that the people submit to duties in their home territory. He also rebuilt his grandfather's and father's mansion at Luoyang (which was destroyed in the late-Tang Huang Chao Rebellion) and built houses around the mansion to allow his clansmen who were not serving in government to live and farm on the property.

In 952, when Guo was battling the rebellion by Liu Zhiyuan's half-brother Murong Yanchao at Yan Prefecture (兗州, in modern Jining, Shandong), he left Li in charge of the capital, as well as serving as the acting mayor of Kaifeng. Later in the year (after Guo had destroyed Murong's rebellion), Li suffered injuries to his right arm in a fall, and requested to resign. Guo did not allow him to resign, instead ordering him to simply attend to the affairs of state and not having to attend imperial meetings.

In 953, for reasons lost to history, Wang Jun, who had been Guo's closest associate ever since he joined Guo's rebellion against Liu Chengyou and who had been extremely powerful in Guo's administration, demanded that Guo replace Fan and Li as chancellors with Yan Kan (顏衎) and Chen Guan (陳觀). Guo initially attempted to dissuade Wang by telling him that that will happen later, but when Wang insisted, turned against Wang and put him under house arrest. Wang died shortly after.

Guo Wei died in 954 and was succeeded by his adoptive son Guo Rong the Prince of Jin (the biological son of his brother-in-law Chai Shouli). Almost immediately on Guo Rong's ascension to the throne, Liu Zhiyuan's brother Liu Min the emperor of Later Zhou's northwestern neighbor Northern Han (which claimed to be the legitimate successor to Later Han) launched a major attack on Later Zhou, allied with the Khitan Liao dynasty to the north. Against the advice of most of his officials and generals, Guo Rong decided to command the Later Zhou troops himself. Li Gu accompanied him on the campaign. The armies engaged at Gaoping (高平, in modern Jincheng, Shanxi). The engagement initially went poorly for Later Zhou troops, and during the battle, the panic was such that Li had to hide in a valley. However, the battle then turned against the Northern Han/Liao troops, and the Northern Han troops were routed. Li, however, was unable to leave the valley for a few days, and only after that did he rejoin the victorious Guo Rong. The Later Zhou emperor decided to advance and put the Northern Han capital Taiyuan under siege, and he had Li accompany there to be in charge of supplying the troops. However, when the food supply ran out for the Later Zhou troops, Guo Rong withdrew the Later Zhou army. Upon Guo Rong's return to Kaifeng, he gave Li the honorary title Sikong (司空), made him Menxia Shilang (門下侍郎, the deputy head of the examination bureau), and put him in charge of editing the imperial history. Li pointed out that during the past dynasties, there were imperial attendants recording the words and actions of the emperor, and that the history needed to be based on such records, but that this responsibility had been neglected during the wars. He requested that imperial scholars be appointed to this task, and that their records be then turned over to the historians. Later in the year, Guo Rong sent Li to oversee a project to rebuild Yellow River levees at Chan (澶州, in modern Anyang, Henan), Yun (鄆州, in modern Tai'an, Shandong), and Qi (齊州, in modern Jinan, Shandong) Prefectures. (The Yellow River levees in the region had been destroyed years earlier, causing frequent massive flooding and great human misery, including famines, in the region, and over the years, the successive dynasties were unable to properly rebuild the levees.) Under Li's supervision, 60,000 men were conscripted, and the project was completed in 30 days.

In winter 955, Guo Rong launched a major attack on Later Zhou's southeastern neighbor Southern Tang (the successor state to Wu). He put Li in command of the army and made him acting governor of the Southern Tang prefectures that Later Zhou was seeking to capture, including Shou (壽州, in modern Lu'an) and Lu (廬州, in modern Hefei, Anhui) Prefectures, with the general Wang Yanchao (王彥超) serving as his deputy and 12 generals serving under them. Li and Wang crossed the Huai at Zhengyang by means of a temporary floating bridge, and put Shou Prefecture under siege. However, even though the Later Zhou army scored several victories against Southern Tang forces, Li was unable to capture Shou quickly. In spring 956, fearful that the Southern Tang general Liu Yanzhen (劉彥貞) would destroy the bridge and leave the Later Zhou army with no means to retreat, he decided to withdraw back north of the Huai and await Guo, who had decided to lead an army himself to join the attack by that point, as well as the major general Li Chongjin (Guo's cousin). Li's withdrawal drew disapproval from Guo, but turned out to work well for Later Zhou — as Liu believed it to be a sign of weakness and decided to prepare to attack the Later Zhou army, despite the dissuasions by Southern Tang's defender of Shou, Liu Renzhan (劉仁瞻). When Li Chongjin subsequently arrived and engaged Liu Yanzhen, Liu Yanzhen's army was crushed — Liu Yanzhen himself was killed, and several of his subordinate generals were captured. Guo subsequently had Li Chongjin replace Li Gu as the overall commander of the operations, while making Li Gu the acting governor of Shou, apparently having Li Gu overseeing the subsequent reinitiating of the siege against Shou.

In fall 956, with Guo himself back in Kaifeng but the campaign continuing, he recalled Li Gu to the capital. Shortly after, Li suffered a stroke that led him to take a leave from governmental service. After he was on leave for 100 days, he made repeated requests to retire. Guo declined his requests and continued to have him serve as chancellor, often sending attendants to ask for his suggestion. By spring 957 — at which time the Shou defenses were still holding under Liu Renzhan's capable defense, despite many heavy losses suffered by Southern Tang in other parts of the campaign, and many Later Zhou officials were calling for abandoning the Southern Tang campaign — Guo sent Fan Zhi and Wang Pu to Li's mansion to consult with him. Li suggested that Guo himself again head to the Shou siege, believing that doing so would be a great morale booster for the Later Zhou forces and would destroy the morale of the Southern Tang forces. When Guo went to Shou, the Later Zhou forces defeated the Southern Tang forces trying to lift the siege, and subsequently, with Liu Renzhan deathly ill, the Shou garrison surrendered to Later Zhou. Guo rewarded Li greatly for his contributions. Upon Guo's return to Kaifeng, Li again requested to retire, which Guo initially again declined but finally accepted in the fall, allowing him to keep only the position of Sikong while removing him from the chancellor post. After the conclusion of the campaign in 958 — which ended with Southern Tang ceding all of its remaining territory north of the Yangtze River and submitting to Later Zhou as a vassal — Guo again rewarded Li greatly.

In 959, Guo Rong died, and his young son Guo Zongxun the Prince of Liang succeeded him as emperor. The new emperor gave Li Gu the additional honorific title Kaifu Yitong Sansi (開府儀同三司) and created him the Duke of Zhao. Li subsequently requested retirement to Luoyang, and that request was granted. Li Rong, whose name had been changed to Li Yun (to observe naming taboo for Guo Rong) was then the military governor of Zhaoyi Circuit (昭義, headquartered in modern Changzhi, Shanxi), and he, believing that Li Gu was a great chancellor, sent gifts of money and other materials to him, which Li Gu accepted.

=== Song ===
In 960, the general Zhao Kuangyin (posthumously remembered as Emperor Taizu) seized the throne in a coup, ending Later Zhou and starting a new Song dynasty. He sent a messenger to provide Li Gu with additional rewards. Shortly after the declaration of the Song dynasty, Li Yun rose against the new Song emperor in Zhaoyi. Worried that he would be considered part of this rebellion, Li Gu became distressed and fell seriously ill. He died shortly after Li Yun killed himself after defeat. The Song emperor gave him posthumous honors.
