= Dou Zhengu =

Dou Zhengu (Chinese: 竇貞固; 892–969), courtesy name Tiren (體仁), noble title Duke of Yi (沂國公), was a Chinese historian and politician. He served as an official of the Chinese Later Tang, Later Jin, Later Han, and Later Zhou dynasties, serving as a chancellor of the Later Han and the Later Zhou.

== Background ==
Dou Zhengu was born in 892, during the reign of Emperor Zhaozong of Tang. He was from Baishui (白水, in modern Weinan, Shaanxi). His father Dou Zhuan (竇專) would subsequently serve as a consultant in the imperial government of Later Tang. Dou Zhengu himself was said to be capable in writing even in his youth.

== During Later Tang ==
Dou Zhengu passed the imperial examinations in the Jinshi class during the Tongguang era (923-926) of Later Tang's founding emperor Li Cunxu, and he was made the secretary general for Wanquan County (萬全, in modern Zhangjiakou, Hebei). He later left governmental service to observe a mourning period after his mother's death. After the mourning period was over, he was made an assistant to Shi Jingtang the military governor (Jiedushi) of Hedong Circuit (河東, headquartered in modern Taiyuan, Shanxi). Shi considered Dou to be an honest official, and thus viewed him highly.

== During Later Jin ==
=== During Shi Jingtang's reign ===
In 936, Shi Jingtang, with aid from the Khitan Empire, rebelled against then-Later Tang emperor Li Congke (Li Siyuan's adoptive son and Shi's brother-in-law) and established Later Jin. In his nascent government, he made Dou Zhengu an imperial scholar (翰林學士, Hanlin Xueshi), as well as Hubu Yuanwailang (戶部員外郎), a low-level official at the ministry of census (戶部, Hubu). He then gave Dou the greater title of Zhongshu Sheren (中書舍人), a mid-level official at the legislative bureau of government (中書省, Zhongshu Sheng). Not long after, with Khitan help, Shi destroyed Later Tang and took over its territory.

In 938, Shi encouraged his officials to submit secret proposals to improve his governance. Dou submitted a petition in which he suggested that the imperial officials be required to submit recommendations for people to be commissioned, pointing out that at that time, the Later Jin government lacked capable officials and thus such recommendations were necessary for good governance. He further suggested that the promotions and demotions of recommending officials be tied to the performance of those that they recommended. Shi was very pleased with his proposal and made it law. In 939, Shi made Dou the deputy chief imperial censor (御史中丞, Yushi Zhongcheng), and ordered him, along with the minister of ceremony Cui Zhuo (崔梲), the deputy minister of justice Lü Qi (呂琦), and the deputy minister of rites Zhang Yuntong (張允同), to draft regulations for imperial gatherings, as well as music and dance appropriate for such ceremonies. Later in Shi's reign, Dou served successively as the deputy minister of justice (刑部侍郎, Xingbu Shilang) and then Menxia Shilang (門下侍郎), the deputy head of the examination bureau (門下省, Menxia Sheng). During his service under Shi, he had friendly relations with the major general Liu Zhiyuan.

=== During Shi Chonggui's reign ===
During the subsequent reign of Shi Jingtang's adoptive son (biological nephew) Shi Chonggui, Dou initially served as the minister of public works (工部尚書, Gongbu Shangshu), and then the minister of rites (禮部尚書, Libu Shangshu). He was put in charge of the imperial examinations. In the Tang days, the imperial examinations were held not only at day, but also at night (for the duration that it would take to burn through three candles), but in 931 (during Li Siyuan's reign), that custom was changed such that the examinations would only happen during the day. Dou considered the daylight period to be insufficient for the testing, and requested that nighttime examinations be restored. He was also praised for being fair in his administration of the examinations. He was later made the minister of justice (刑部尚書, Xingbu Shangshu), before being sent out of the imperial government to serve as the military prefect (團練使, Tuanlianshi) of Ying Prefecture (潁州, in modern Fuyang, Anhui), where he remained for a year, before being recalled to the imperial government to again serve as minister of justice.

== During Later Han ==
=== During Liu Zhiyuan's reign ===
Around the new year 947, Later Jin was destroyed by Khitan (then known as Liao)'s Emperor Taizong. Emperor Taizong entered Later Jin's capital Daliang and initially declared himself emperor of China as well. (Dou Zhengu's activities during this period were not clearly stated in traditional histories, although he presumably, along with other Later Jin officials, submitted to the Liao emperor.) Liu Zhiyuan, then the military governor of Hedong, initially postured that he would submit to Liao, but then declared himself emperor (of a new state later known as Later Han). With Liu and many others resisting his rule, Emperor Taizong withdrew from the Central Plains region and died on the way back to Liao proper. In the power vacuum, Liu first entered Luoyang, and then headed for Daliang. Dou, along with the other Later Jin officials remaining at Daliang, went to Xingyang (滎陽, in modern Zhengzhou, Henan) to welcome him to Daliang, which he subsequently entered. Not long after, Liu requested discussions on how he should establish the imperial temples, in light of the fact that he had claimed ancestry from the Han dynasty imperial clan and honored Emperor Guangwu of Han as a distant ancestor. Dou proposed that it would be appropriate to establish six temples, with Emperor Gao of Han and Emperor Guangwu serving as the two most honored ancestors, and Liu's own four generations of ancestors in the other four temples. Liu followed his proposal, and thereafter made him the minister of civil service affairs (吏部尚書, Libu Shangshu, note not the same as minister of rites).

Later in the year, finding that having two chancellors (Su Fengji and Su Yugui) was not sufficient, he resolved to commission at least one more chancellor. Su Fengji recommended Li Tao, but as Liu respected Dou, he decided to make both Li and Dou chancellors with the title of Tong Zhongshu Menxia Pingzhangshi (同中書門下平章事), with Dou receiving the additional titles of Menxia Shilang, Sikong (司空, one of the Three Excellencies), and grand imperial scholar at Hongwen Pavilion.

In early 948, Liu Zhiyuan fell deathly ill. He entrusted his son Liu Chengyou to Su Fengji, Yang Bin, Shi Hongzhao, and Guo Wei, and then died. Liu Chengyou thereafter took the throne.

=== During Liu Chengyou's reign ===
During Liu Chengyou's administration, there was a split of authorities among the high level officials. Yang Bin oversaw the governmental operations; Guo Wei oversaw military operations; Shi Hongzhao oversaw the imperial guards; and Wang Zhang oversaw the financial agencies. Su Fengji, Su Yugui, and Dou Zhengu served as chancellors. It was said, however, that Dou was only able to be elegant and upright in his behavior, and was unable to curb the power-grabbing of Yang, Shi, and Wang.

In 949, after Guo defeated the rebellion of the major general Li Shouzhen, Guo declined to be individually rewarded, so the other high-level officials and regional governors were all rewarded. As part of the rewards, Dou was given the title of Situ (司徒, also one of the Three Excellencies).

In summer 950, an incident occurred to damage the relationship between the leading officials. They had discussed and resolved that, because of frequent Liao incursions and the inability for the circuits to coordinate their defenses, Guo Wei should be sent to Yedu (鄴都, in modern Handan, Hebei) to serve as its defender (as well as the military governor of Tianxiong Circuit (天雄, headquartered at Yedu) to coordinate the defense against Liao. Shi advocated that Guo be allowed to continue to retain his title as chief of staff to allow him to give orders to the military governors. Su Fengji opposed, pointing out that there had been no precedent to allow a military governor to continue to retain chief of staff title. Eventually, Liu Chengyou approved Shi's proposal. When Shi then complained to Su about his opposition, Su responded, "Letting the central government control the outlying circuits is proper. How can it be that now you are letting an outlying circuit control the central government?"

It was at the send-off dinner for Guo the next day, at Dou's mansion, that frictions within the imperial government came to the forefront. At the feast, Shi, when toasting Guo, spoke in a harsh voice, "How could there have been opposition when we discussed this matter yesterday at the imperial gathering? Now, let us drink, younger brother [(i.e., Guo)]!" Su and Yang also raised their cups and stated, "This is an important matter for the state. Do not bear grudges!" Shi responded, again in a harsh voice, "To settle the state, it takes long spears and large swords. What use does the ink brush have?" Wang Zhang, the director of the financial agencies, responded, "Without ink brushes, where does money come from?" It was said that from this point on, there were increasing tension between generals and chancellors.

By winter 950, Liu Chengyou himself had tired of the control the senior officials had on his government, even though, under Yang's leadership, the imperial government was considered well-run. He conspired with his uncle Li Ye (李業), as well as his favorite attendants Nie Wenjin (聶文進), Hou Kuangzan (後匡贊), and Guo Yunming (郭允明), to kill Yang and the others. Soon thereafter, they surprised and killed Yang, Shi, and Wang. Guo Wei's and Wang Jun's families were slaughtered, leading to Guo's rising at Yedu, taking his army south, and heading toward Daliang. Hearing that Guo was approaching, Liu Chengyou, in fear, commented to Dou, "Maybe I was being too frivolous." Despite this realization, he did not accept his mother Empress Dowager Li's advice to try to maintain a pretense of emperor-subject relations with Guo Wei; rather, commissioning Liu Zhiyuan's half-brother Murong Yanchao as the commander of the imperial troops, he decided to confront Guo Wei personally. He took the three chancellors (Su Fengji, Su Yugui, and Dou) with him. Around the new year 951, Guo's army and the imperial army confronted each other, and the imperial troops were defeated; most of the generals surrendered to Guo Wei. Thereafter, Liu Chengyou was killed in the confusion, and Su Fengji committed suicide. Su Yugui and Dou hid themselves, but after Guo entered Daliang, he located them and restored them to their chancellor positions.

Guo initially postured that he would support Liu Zhiyuan's adoptive son (biological nephew) Liu Yun the military governor of Wuning Circuit (武寧, headquartered in modern Xuzhou, Jiangsu) to succeed to the Later Han throne. However, before Liu Yun would arrive at Daliang, with news that came that there was a Liao incursion, Guo headed north, ostensibly to defend against it, while leaving the matters of state at Daliang to Dou, Su Yugui, and Wang Jun, and military matters to Wang Yin (王殷). Shortly after Guo left Daliang, his soldiers rose and supported him as emperor. He thereafter returned to Daliang and claimed the throne, establishing Later Zhou. (He put Liu Yun under house arrest, and thereafter had Liu Yun killed.)

== During Later Zhou ==
Shortly after Guo Wei took the throne, he bestowed on Dou Zhengu the greater chancellor title of Shizhong (侍中). Not long after, with the senior statesman Feng Dao becoming a chancellor again, Dou was put in charge of editing imperial histories. Not long after, he was removed from his chancellor position, carrying only now his title as Situ, and was created the Duke of Yi.

In 954, by which time Guo Wei had died and been succeeded by his adoptive son Guo Rong, the chancellor Fan Zhi was given the title of Situ. As a result, Dou was effectively forced into retirement, and took up residence at Luoyang. The local government considered his household to be a regular household and did not exempt it from either taxes or conscripted labor. Dou went to see the defender of Luoyang, Xiang Xun (向訓), to request to be exempted, but Xiang did not listen to him.

== During Song ==
After the Later Zhou throne was seized by the general Zhao Kuangyin, who established Song dynasty as its Emperor Taizu, Dou Zhengu was summoned back to the imperial court given his prior status as one of the Three Excellencies. He went to see Fan Zhi, who had remained a chancellor under the new Song emperor, requesting that he be given an honorary post as an advisor to the Crown Prince so that he could attend imperial meetings. Fan paid his request no heed and did not report it to the emperor. He thus returned to Luoyang. There, he spent his days visiting the mountains and the rivers, in the company of commoners and prostitutes, drinking and enjoying their company. In 969, he became ill, and he authored his own tombstone text before dying.

== Notes and references ==
- History of Song, vol. 262.
- Zizhi Tongjian, vols. 280, 287, 288, 289, 290, 292.
