= Wancheng (disambiguation) =

Wancheng (宛城) is a district of Nanyang, Henan.

- Wan Castle (Wancheng), located in present-day Nanyang and known as the site of a battle between Cao Cao and Zhang Xiu in AD 197

Wancheng (万城) may also refer to the following places in China:

- Wancheng, Hainan, a town in Wanning, Hainan
- Wancheng Township, a township in Gaoyi County, Hebei

== See also ==
- Wanzhou (disambiguation)
- Wan Cheng (born 1985), Chinese footballer
- Wangcheng (disambiguation)
