= Yang Bin =

Prince of Hongnong chancellor of the Later Han

Yang Bin (楊邠) (died December 24, 950), formally the Prince of Hongnong (弘農王) (as posthumously honored during Later Zhou), was a chancellor of the Chinese Five Dynasties and Ten Kingdoms Period Later Han state, serving effectively as the head of the government for most of the reign of its second emperor Liu Chengyou (Emperor Yin), leading a group of high-ranking officials in doing so. However, Liu Chengyou eventually tired of these officials' governance and had Yang killed, along with Shi Hongzhao and Wang Zhang.

== Background ==
It is not known when Yang Bin was born, but it is known that he was from Guangshi (冠氏, in modern Liaocheng, Shandong). In his youth, he became an administrator at the headquarters of the military governor (Jiedushi) of Tianxiong Circuit (天雄, headquartered in modern Handan, Hebei), whose capital Wei Prefecture (魏州) Guanshi belonged to. His wife Lady Kong's paternal uncle was the prominent Later Tang official Kong Qian, who, during the reign of Later Tang's first emperor Li Cunxu, served as the director of material pricing (租庸使, Zuyongshi). During Kong's tenure as the director of material pricing, he made Yang an escort officer, and subsequently, Yang successively served as the food supply officer for three prefectures: Meng (孟州, in modern Luoyang, Henan), Hua (華州, in modern Weinan, Shaanxi), and Yun (鄆州, in modern Tai'an, Shandong).

Later, during the succeeding Later Jin, when the major general Liu Zhiyuan became the defender of Yedu (鄴都, i.e., Wei Prefecture), Liu made Yang one of his guard commanders. When Liu was subsequently moved to be the defender of Taiyuan, Yang apparently followed Liu to his new post, and became a close confidant of Liu's.

== During Liu Zhiyuan's reign ==
Around new year 947, Later Jin's northern neighbor, the Khitan Liao dynasty captured Later Jin's capital Daliang, ending Later Jin. Most Later Jin military governors initially reacted by submitting to Liao's Emperor Taizong as emperor, as Emperor Taizong claimed to be the emperor of central China as well. Liu Zhiyuan initially postured the same way, but his followers, including Yang Bin and Guo Wei, urged him to take imperial title himself. He soon did (as the emperor of a new state that would later be known as Later Han), and, after doing so, made Yang his acting chief of staff (Shumishi).

Meanwhile, Liao's Emperor Taizong, faced with Han Chinese resistance to his rule, left Daliang and intended to return to Liao proper, but died on the way, and was succeeded by his nephew Emperor Shizong, who continued back to Liao proper (to fend off a succession challenge by Emperor Taizong's younger brother Yelü Lihu). Liao generals in the Central Plains region initially continued to try to hold the territory, but gradually lost control due to the Han resistance. Liu launched his army, with Shi Hongzhao serving as his forward troop commander, intending to take the Luoyang-Daliang region, but after Shi initially was bogged down in a siege of Ze Prefecture (澤州, in modern Jincheng, Shanxi), considered recalling Shi. It was after Yang and Su Fengji opposed it (based on the rationale that if he showed weakness, the prefectures that already showed willingness to submit to him would rethink their positions, and Liao might be able to recover from the losses) that he rethought the plan, and, after consulting Shi further, allowed Shi to continue the campaign. (Shi was eventually able to get Ze's prefect Zhai Lingqi (翟令奇) to submit, allowing Shi to continue to advance to Luoyang and get the region to submit to Liu.) After Liu entered Luoyang, he made Yang permanent chief of staff. Liu entrusted the matters of the military to him and Guo, and the matters of government to Su Fengji and Su Yugui.

Shortly thereafter, Du Chongwei, the Liao-commissioned military governor of Tianxiong, who had submitted to Later Han, rebelled when Liu tried to move him to Guide Circuit (歸德, headquartered in modern Shangqiu, Henan). Liu sent the general Gao Xingzhou to command the Later Han troops against Du, with Liu's half-brother Murong Yanchao serving as Gao's deputy. Disputes soon rose between Gao and Murong over strategy: Gao wanted to surround the city and wear out Du's troops, while Murong wanted to immediately siege the city, and went as far as claiming that Gao's refusal to attack immediately was due to a marriage between Gao's daughter and Du's son. With Gao and Murong having disagreement, Liu decided to personally head to Yedu to oversee the campaign. When he arrived there, Gao continued to advocate the slow siege strategy, wanting to wear out the city's food supply and pointing out that the city was well-defended, so an aggressive attack would cause many casualties. With Murong continuing to accuse him, he also went to Su Fengji and Yang to plead his case, stuffing feces and dirt into his mouth as he was doing so, to emphasize the humiliation he had undergone at Murong's hands. After Yang and Su Fengji reported this to Liu, Liu believed Gao, went to his tent to thank him, and rebuked Murong. (Gao's strategy would eventually force Du into surrendering.)

In spring 948, Liu Zhiyuan fell deathly ill. When he did so, Yang became apprehensive about Liu's younger brother Liu Xin (劉信), who was both an imperial guard cavalry commander and the military governor of Zhongwu Circuit (忠武, headquartered in modern Xuchang, Henan), and sent Liu Xin away from the capital (in tears) without allowing him to see the ill emperor. When Liu Zhiyuan came close to death, he entrusted his younger son Liu Chengyou to Su Fengji, Yang, Shi, and Guo, stating, "My remaining breaths are getting short, and I cannot speak much. Chengyou is young and weak, so what happens after my death has to be entrusted to you." He also told them to guard against Du. After Liu Zhiyuan died the same day, these officials, without announcing his death, had Du and his sons put to death. Liu Chengyou was created the Prince of Zhou, and shortly after, when Liu Zhiyuan's death was announced, Liu Chengyou succeeded him as emperor.

== During Liu Chengyou's reign ==
Early in Liu Chengyou's reign, the high-level officials were in a collective leadership, with different responsibilities. Yang Bin oversaw the governmental operations; Guo Wei oversaw military operations; Shi Hongzhao oversaw the imperial guards; and Wang Zhang oversaw the financial agencies. Su Fengji, Su Yugui, and Dou Zhengu served as chancellors. However, when the chancellors, led by Su Fengji, wanted to promote officials and fill unfilled positions, Yang saw the requests as wasteful and often rejected them, causing the chancellors to be displeased. In spring 948, one of the chancellors, Li Tao, submitted a petition to Liu Chengyou suggesting that Yang and Guo (who was then deputy chief of staff) be given military commands outside the capital and that key matters be decided by Su Fengji and Su Yugui. When Yang and Guo heard of this, they went to see Liu Chengyou's mother (Liu Zhiyuan's wife) Empress Dowager Li, stating to her, "Your subjects have followed the deceased emperor ever since difficult times. Now, the Son of Heaven is accepting other people's word and wants to send us out. Given that there are troubles west of the pass [(i.e., in the Guanzhong region, where the general Wang Jingchong was fostering a rebellion)], how can we, your subjects and ignore the affairs of the state? If we are not to remain, we hope to at least remain until the deceased emperor's burial." Empress Dowager Li was angered, and she went to Liu Chengyou, stating to him, "These are the old and accomplished subjects of the state. Why are you listening to others and expelling them?" When Liu Chengyou blamed the matter on the chancellors in general, Li Tao took the blame by himself, and was relieved of his chancellor position. Subsequently, Yang was given an additional chancellor position, while Guo was made co-chief of staff, such that Yang became the main decision-maker, with the three chancellors no longer having real chancellor authority. Indeed, it was said that even on minor matters, even if the three chancellors concurred, no decision would be carried out unless Yang agreed with it, such that many needed actions became stalled. In particular, Yang, who rose from administrative ranks, disliked people in traditional learning, often stating: "For the state, it is most important that the treasury is full, and the military is strong. Who cares about matters of literature, rites, and music?" Further, as he still resented Su Fengji and Su Yugui (believing that they were behind Li Tao's petition) and also believed that the two Su chancellors had been insufficiently selective in their commissioning of officials, he made the process of commissioning officials to be an arduous one, such that sometimes people who had been promised official positions would not be commissioned for years. Further, those who had received their positions through connections or through seniority were often removed.

In 949, after Guo suppressed Li Shouzhen's rebellion (as well as Wang Jingchong's and Zhao Siwan's), Guo declined to be honored alone for his achievements, and therefore all of the high-level officials were honored. In Yang's case, he was given the additional title of You Pushe (右僕射, one of the heads of the executive bureau of government (尚書省, Shangshu Sheng)).

Yang was said to be a micromanager. After it became known that one of Wang Jingchong's chief strategists, Zhou Can (周璨), was one of the officials that had been displaced by his reductions on official commissions and thus became discontented, he tried to quell the discontent by ordering that all of those who had been displaced to report to Daliang. The move backfired, however, as those officials gathered at Daliang and were daily petitioning the chancellors for new posts. He tried to divert the crowd by ordering that some report to Luoyang instead, but that led to many of them being left without lodging on the way to Luoyang. He ordered that the official post stations between Daliang and Luoyang provide these officials with lodging, but that led to overcrowding and disturbances of the people on the way, and he finally ended that policy as well.

However, Yang was also said to be honest and faithful. He conducted official business publicly, and he did not privately meet people to discuss them. While many people tried to bribe him for favors, he would take the bribes and turn the bribes into imperial treasury. He was also attentive to keeping proper historical records.

In summer 950, Yang offered to resign his post as chief of staff, as a sign of showing humility, but Liu Chengyou sent a eunuch to dissuade him from resigning. At that time, also present was the director of palace affairs, Wu Qianyu (吳虔裕), who made the comment, "The Office of the Chief of Staff is a burdensome place, and it is difficult for anyone to be there long. A successor should be considered, and the Lord Chancellor [(i.e., Yang)] is correct in trying to resign." Liu heard of this and became displeased with Wu, and sent him out of the capital to serve as the defender of Zheng Prefecture (鄭州, in modern Zhengzhou, Henan).

Shortly, an incident occurred to further damage the relationship between the leading officials. They had discussed and resolved that, because of frequent Liao incursions and the inability for the circuits to coordinate their defenses, Guo should be sent to Yedu (鄴都, i.e., Wei Prefecture) to serve as its defender (as well as the military governor of Tianxiong) to coordinate the defense against Liao. Shi advocated that Guo be allowed to continue to retain his title as chief of staff to allow him to give orders to the military governors. Su Fengji opposed, pointing out that there had been no precedent to allow a military governor to continue to retain chief of staff title. Eventually, Liu Chengyou approved Shi's proposal. When Shi then complained to Su about his opposition, Su responded, "Letting the central government control the outlying circuits is proper. How can it be that now you are letting an outlying circuit control the central government?"

It was at the send-off dinner for Guo the next day, at Dou's mansion, that frictions within the imperial government came to the forefront. At the feast, Shi, when toasting Guo, spoke in a harsh voice, "How could there have been opposition when we discussed this matter yesterday at the imperial gathering? Now, let us drink, younger brother [(i.e., Guo)]!" Su and Yang also raised their cups and stated, "This is an important matter for the state. Do not bear grudges!" Shi responded, again in a harsh voice, "To settle the state, it takes long spears and large swords. What use does the ink brush have? Wang Zhang responded, "Without ink brushes, where does money come from?" It was said that from this point on, there were increasing tension between generals and chancellors. Later, when Guo was about to leave the capital, he went to see Liu Chengyou and stated to him:

The Empress Dowager had long followed the deceased Emperor, and she has experienced many things. Your Imperial Majesty is your prime years. If there are important matters, it is best to ask her advice and follow it. You should be close to the faithful and honest, and be far away from the slanderous and the wicked. Be careful in examining between good and evil. Su Fengji, Yang Bin, and Shi Hongzhao are all the deceased Emperor's old subjects. They are faithful and caring for the state. May it be that Your Imperial Majesty trust them and use them, and there will be no trouble. As far as what happens on the battlefield, I, your subject, wishes to expend all of my foolish and foolhardy efforts, hopefully being worthy of your service.

Liu Chengyou showed a serious expression and thanked Guo. However, the tension between the officials continued. Not long after Guo's departure, Wang Zhang hosted a feast for the honored officials. During the feast, there was a drinking game that Shi was unfamiliar with. The director of diplomatic protocol, Yan Jinqing (閻晉卿), was seated next to Shi, and repeatedly reminded him of what the game's rules were. Su Fengji joked, "When you are seated next to someone named Yan, you need not fear being punished." However, Shi took the comment badly, as he thought that Su was satirizing his wife Lady Yan, who was once a prostitute working in a drinking hall. He cursed Su, and when Su did not respond, got up and wanted to batter Su. As a response, Su left, and he took a sword and considered chasing after Su. Yang wept and urged him to stop, stating, "Lord Su is a chancellor. If you, Lord, killed him, what kind of a place are you putting the Son of Heaven into? Please think carefully!" Shi thereafter got on a horse and left, and Yang followed him on a horse as well, not leaving him until he reached his manor. When Liu Chengyou heard of this, he sent the director of palace affairs, Wang Jun, to try to moderate, but could not repair the relationship between them. Su considered requesting an assignment as a circuit military governor, but then decided that if he left the capital, Shi could easily destroy him, and so did not. Wang Zhang, however, did request such an assignment, but Yang and Shi urged him against leaving the capital.

By winter 950, Liu Chengyou himself had tired of the control the senior officials had on his government, even though, under Yang's leadership, the imperial government was considered well-run, and Shi's overseeing of the capital made it safe for the public. Part of the friction came from how his close associates and relatives of the empress dowager were trying to gain power, but were being thwarted by Yang and Shi. At that time, Empress Dowager Li's younger brother Li Ye (李業) was serving as the director of miscellaneous affairs (武德使, Wudeshi) inside the palace, but wanted to be promoted to the higher position of director of palace affairs, a desire that Liu Chengyou and Empress Dowager Li were both in concurrence with, but Yang and Shi considered inappropriate as he lacked the seniority, so they stopped his commission. Further, Hou Kuangzan (後匡贊) the director of imperial stables, Guo Yunming (郭允明) the director of tea and wine, and Nie Wenjin (聶文進) the liaison officer at the office of the chiefs of staff, were all favored by Liu Chengyou, but had long not been promoted, causing them to be resentful. When Liu Chengyou wanted to make his favorite concubine Consort Geng empress, Yang considered it too quick after the expiration of his morning period for Liu Zhiyuan, and so opposed it. When Consort Geng died, Yang opposed Liu Chengyou's wishes to have her buried with the ceremonies due an empress. Further, there was an occasion when Yang and Shi were discussing state matters with Liu Chengyou, Liu Chengyou made the comment, "Be careful! Do not let others get a chance to criticize you!" Yang responded, "Your Imperial Majesty should just be quiet. Your subjects are still here." This led to Liu Chengyou's resentment toward them, and his close associates thereafter falsely accused Yang and the others of plotting against him. As Su resented Shi, he also incited Li Ye and the others.

Liu Chengyou, thereafter, plotted with Li Ye, Nie, Hou, and Guo Yunming to kill Yang and the others. Liu Chengyou reported his plans to Empress Dowager Li, who responded, "How can such things be easily considered! You should discuss with the chancellors further." However, Li Ye then stated, "The deceased Emperor had said before that the matters of the state should not be discussed with scholars. Their timidity will ruin you." When Empress Dowager Li tried to speak again, Liu Chengyou responded angrily, "The matters of state cannot be decided in the halls of a woman!"

On December 24, 950, as the officials were arriving at the palace for the imperial gathering, a number of soldiers appeared and killed Yang, Shi, and Wang Zhang. Subsequently, Liu Chengyou declared that they had committed treason, and stated to the chancellors and the other officials, "Yang Bin and the others viewed us as a young child. We finally now get to be your true lord. You should not worry!" He sent soldiers to arrest and kill the relatives and close associates of Yang, Shi, and Wang. Later, after Guo overthrew Liu Chengyou and established Later Zhou, Guo posthumously created Yang as the Prince of Hongnong.

== Notes and references ==
- Old History of the Five Dynasties, vol. 107.
- New History of the Five Dynasties, vol. 30.
- Zizhi Tongjian, vols. 286, 287, 288, 289.
