= Wang Chang =

Wang Chang may refer to:

- Wang Lang (Xin dynasty) (died 24), originally named Wang Chang, warlord at the end of the Xin dynasty
- Wang Chang (Three Kingdoms) (died 259), Cao Wei official
- Wang Jipeng (died 939), emperor of Min, known as Wang Chang after 935
- Wang Chang (died 1389), the personal name of King Chang of Goryeo
- Wang Chang (badminton) (born 2001), Chinese badminton player
- Wang Chang (Yanqing) (王常), style name Yanqing, Xin dynasty and early Eastern Han general
- Wang Chang (Shumao) (王暢), style name Shumao, late Eastern Han official
- Wang Chang (Qing Dynasty) (王昶), Qing dynasty scholar

== See also ==
- Wang Zhang (died 950), Later Han official, romanised as "Wang Chang" in Wade–Giles
- Wangchang (disambiguation) for places
