= Wangcheng =

Wangcheng may refer to the following places in China:

- Wangcheng (Zhou dynasty), an ancient settlement from the Eastern Zhou period, located near modern Luoyang, Henan
- Wangcheng District, a district of Changsha, Hunan
  - Wangcheng Economic and Technological Development Zone, in Wangcheng District

== Towns ==
- Wangcheng, Hubei (王城), in Zaoyang, Hubei
- Wangcheng, Jiangxi (望城), in Nanchang, Jiangxi

== Subdistricts ==
- Wangcheng Subdistrict, Lu'an (望城街道), in Jin'an District, Lu'an, Anhui
- Wangcheng Subdistrict, Linli County, in Linli County, Hunan
- Wangcheng Subdistrict, Laixi (望城街道), in Laixi, Shandong

== See also ==
- Wang Cheng (died 1200), Song dynasty historian and author of Dongdu Shilüe
- Wancheng (disambiguation)
- Wangchang (disambiguation)
