= Wanchang =

Wanchang may refer to the following places in China:

- Wanchang, Jilin (万昌), a town in Yongji County, Jilin
- Wanchang, Weiyuan County (碗厂), a town in Weiyuan County, Sichuan
- Wanchang Township (碗厂乡), a township in Zhaojue County, Sichuan
- Wanchang, Yunnan (碗厂), a town in Zhenxiong County, Yunnan

== See also ==
- Wangchang (disambiguation)
