= Murong Yanchao =

Chinese general

Murong Yanchao (Chinese: 慕容彥超) (died June 15, 952), known at one point as Yan Kunlun (閻崑崙), was a Chinese general of the Later Tang, Later Jin, and Later Han dynasties. As a half-brother of the Later Han founding emperor Liu Zhiyuan (Emperor Gaozu), he was particularly prominent in the Later Han dynasty. After the Later Han throne was seized by the general Guo Wei, who founded the Later Zhou dynasty, Murong initially submitted to Guo but then rebelled. His rebellion was quickly suppressed, and he committed suicide.

== Background ==
It is not known when Murong Yanchao was born. However, as he was known to be a younger half-brother — born of the same mother, a Lady An — as Liu Zhiyuan, who was born in 895, he must have been born after. (Liu Chong, who was of the same father (a man named Liu Dian (劉琠)) as Liu Zhiyuan, might have been also born of Lady An.) Whereas Liu Zhiyuan was said to be Shatuo extraction, Murong was said to be of Tuyuhun extraction, suggesting that those were the respective ethnicities of their fathers. At one point, Murong took on the assumed surname of Yan, and was known by the name of Kunlun due to his dark beard.

== During Later Tang and Later Jin ==
In Murong Yanchao's youth, he served as an officer under Li Siyuan, who would later become an emperor of Later Tang. Subsequently, during Later Tang and its successor state Later Jin, he served successively as the prefect of four prefectures — Ci (磁州, in modern Handan, Hebei), Shan (單州, in modern Heze, Shandong), Pu (濮州, in modern Puyang, Henan), and Di (棣州, in modern Binzhou, Shandong). In 945, during Later Jin's war with its northern neighbor, the Khitan Liao dynasty, there was a battle in which he and Huangfu Yu (皇甫遇) the military governor (Jiedushi) of Yicheng Circuit (義成, headquartered in modern Anyang, Henan) were surrounded by the much more numerous Liao troops near the Zhang River, and fought for an entire day but were able to hold them off. They were eventually able to escape the Khitan troops after being relieved by An Shenqi (安審琦) the military governor of Huguo Circuit (護國, headquartered in modern Yuncheng). It was said that the entire Later Jin army became impressed with his and Huangfu's bravery.

In 946, Murong was accused of, while serving as Pu's prefect, illegally collecting taxes, as well as fermenting wheat stored in governmental storage to give to his soldiers without authorization. The then-powerful imperial guard general Li Yantao (李彥韜) had long had an empty with Murong, and when Li found this out, he made the matter public, and tried to get the chief of staff (Shumishi) Feng Yu to have Murong put to death. Murong's half-brother Liu Zhiyuan, who was then one of the most senior generals of the realm, submitted petitions to then-emperor Shi Chonggui, hoping to save his life. Feng's fellow chief of staff, Li Song, pointed out that Murong's offenses were something that most regional governors had been guilty of at some point, and for Murong to be put to death, everyone would be in fear. Shi spared Murong's life, but stripped him of all of his offices, and exiled him to Fang Prefecture (房州, in modern Shiyan, Hubei).

== During Later Han ==
In 947, a successful Liao attack captured Later Jin's capital Daliang. Liao's Emperor Taizong attempted to rule the former Later Jin territory as well as its emperor, but soon faced much resistance against his rule. One of the main resistors was Liu Zhiyuan, who declared himself emperor at Hedong Circuit (河東, headquartered in modern Taiyuan, Shanxi) (of a state that would be later known as Later Han, and he would eventually take over control of the former Later Jin territory after the Liao forces withdrew. Murong Yanchao, hearing this, escaped from his place of exile at Fang, and Liu made him the military governor of Zhenning Circuit (鎮寧, headquartered in modern Puyang).

Shortly after, the former Later Jin major general Du Chongwei, who had initially submitted to Liu, rebelled against Liu at Tianxiong Circuit (天雄, headquartered in modern Handan) and sought Liao aid. Liu sent the senior general Gao Xingzhou to command the army against Du, and made Murong the deputy to Gao. Murong advocated making an immediate attack on Tianxiong's capital Yedu (鄴都), while Gao wanted to surround the city and wear out Du's army. Murong publicly spoke against Gao's decisions, and claimed that Gao's slowness was due to the fact that Gao's daughter had married Du's son. Liu, hearing that there was discord between Gao and Murong, decided to head to Yedu to oversee the siege himself. When he and his high-level officials arrived at the front, Gao went to Liu's chief assistants Su Fengji and Yang Bin to plead his case — stuffing feces and dirt into his mouth as he was doing so, to analogize it to the kind of humiliation that he suffered from Murong. Liu believed Gao, went to his tent to thank him, and rebuked Murong. At Murong's insistence, a direct attack on the city was made, but over the course of a morning, Later Han forces suffered more than 1,000 deaths and 10,000 injuries due to the strength of Yedu's defense, and Murong did not dare to advocate a direct attack again. Soon thereafter, Du surrendered. Liu made Gao the military governor of Tianxiong, but Gao initially declined, as Tianxiong and Zhenning were neighboring circuits, and he feared further friction. In response, Liu moved Murong to Tianping Circuit (天平, headquartered in modern Tai'an, Shandong); at that time, Murong was also given the honorary chancellor designation of Tong Zhongshu Menxia Pingzhangshi (同中書門下平章事). In 949, by which time Liu Zhiyuan had died and his son Liu Chengyou was emperor, Murong was given the greater honorary chancellor designation of Shizhong (侍中). In spring 950, when a number of military governors went to Daliang to pay homage to the emperor on for the emperor's birthday (at the urging of the high-level officials at the imperial government, who were planning to move them), Murong was one of the ones who did. He was subsequently moved from Tianping to Taining Circuit (泰寧, headquartered in modern Jining, Shandong).

By winter 950, Liu Chengyou had tired of the hold that the high-level officials had on his administration, and viewed them as obstacles to his actually exercising imperial power. Plotting with his close associates Nie Wenjin (聶文進), Hou Kuangzan (後匡贊), and Guo Yunming (郭允明), he surprised and killed the chief of staff Yang Bin, the commander of the imperial guards Shi Hongzhao, and the director of the financial agencies Wang Zhang. Yang's co-chief of staff, Guo Wei, was at Yedu at that time (to defend against a possible Liao incursion) and was not at Daliang, and therefore escaped this fate, but his family was slaughtered. After this imperial coup, Liu sent edicts to a number of military governors, summoning them to Daliang. It appeared that most of them decided to wait to observe what would happen next, but Murong decided to go to Daliang all at once — leaving immediately even though he happened to be eating at the time he received the edict. When he arrived at Daliang, Liu entrusted the command of the imperial troops to him.

Hearing of his family's death, Guo mobilized his troops and headed south toward Daliang. Hou Yi (侯益) advocated not engaging Guo's troops, as Guo's soldiers' family members were all at Daliang, and he believed that once the immediate impulse were lost, Guo's troops would submit to imperial authority. Murong, however, responded, "Hou Yi is old and acting like a coward." Liu listened to Murong, and thereafter sent Hou with other generals Wu Qianyu (吳虔裕) and Zhang Yanchao (張彥超) north to engage Guo's troops first, while Murong and Liu himself prepared to engage Guo afterwards. Murong, initially confident of success, stated, "I, your subject, view the northern army as insects. I will surely capture their leader alive for you, Your Imperial Majesty!" However, after he subsequently was informed by Nie of the size of Guo's army and the officers serving under Guo, he became apprehensive, stating to Nie, "This is a serious enemy. I should not take him lightly."

On December 31, Guo's army and the imperial army encountered at Liuzi Slope (劉子陂). Liu Chengyou wanted to personally go out to encourage the troops. Liu Zhiyuan's wife and Liu Chengyou's mother Empress Dowager Li stated to him, "Guo Wei is our family's old servant. How would he be doing this if it were not a matter of life or death? You should keep the troops in the city and send a messenger with your edict, to observe his intentions. He would surely respond, and you can still maintain the formality of emperor and subject. Do not go out yourself." The young emperor refused her advice. The armies, however, did not actually engage in battle that day, and Liu Chengyou returned to the palace. Murong bragged to him, "These days, Your Imperial Majesty has little to do in the palace. Tomorrow, come watch your subject destroy the bandits. I need not actually battle with them. I will just rebuke them, and they will surely collapse and return to their own barracks [(i.e., abandon Guo and return to Kaifeng)]!"

On January 1, 951, the young emperor again wanted to go encourage the army, and he did so against Empress Dowager Li's advice. The armies met each other again on the front line, and Guo Wei ordered his army not to engage first, stating, "I am here to kill the scoundrels, not to oppose the Son of Heaven. Do not move first." However, after the armies hesitated for some time, Murong led the cavalry in a charge, starting the battle. Guo Wei had Guo Chongwei and Li Rong resist Murong's charge. During the battle, Zhang's horse fell, and he was nearly captured by Guo Wei's army. He was able to withdraw, but more than 100 of his soldiers died, causing a loss of morale in the imperial army, such that the imperial army soldiers began to surrender to Guo's. Even the generals, including Hou, Wu, Zhang, Yuan, and Liu Chongjin, all secretly went to see Guo to offer to surrender, but he sent them all back to their camps. As the sun was setting, more and more of the imperial army was surrendering to Guo's. Murong abandoned the imperial army and fled back to Taining's capital Yan Prefecture (兗州) with only a handful of his guards. The next day, Liu Chengyou was killed by Guo's soldiers in the confusion. Guo subsequently entered the capital and effectively controlled it, although at that time still outwardly acting like a Later Han subject. Liu Chengyou's associates were ordered to be executed. When Hou Kuangzan fled to Taining, Murong, apparently to make peace with Guo, arrested Hou and delivered him back to Daliang.

== During Later Zhou ==
Shortly after, Guo Wei's soldiers supported him to be emperor, and Empress Dowager Li was forced to issue an edict deposing Liu Chong's son Liu Yun the military governor of Wuning Circuit (武寧, headquartered in modern Xuzhou, Jiangsu) — whom she had initially named as the successor to the throne after Liu Chengyou's death) — and passing the throne to Guo, establishing a new state of Later Zhou. Murong Yanchao submitted tributes to the new emperor. Guo, concerned that he would be so apprehensive as to rebel, issued an edict to console him, not referring to him by name, but instead stating to him, "What happened with your older brother is too numerous to repeat. I hope that you, younger brother, can support me, so that we can both have permanent peace." Guo subsequently sent the imperial scholar Yu Chongliang (魚崇諒) to Taining to announce an edict in which he gave Murong the greater honorary chancellor designation of Zhongshu Ling (中書令), and Murong submitted a report thanking Guo. (Liu Zhiyuan's other brother Liu Chong, then the military governor of Hedong, however, did not take the same approach as Murong, and declared himself the successor emperor for Later Han, although historians generally viewed his state as a new state of Northern Han.) Still, Guo's new administration viewed Murong with suspicion. For example, around new year 952, when Liu Chong put Jin Prefecture (晉州, in modern Linfen, Shanxi) under siege and Guo considered heading there himself to engage Liu Chong, Wang Jun warned him that if he left Daliang, Murong might take this opportunity to attack and occupy Daliang. Guo agreed and did not go engage Liu Chong himself.

Murong became more apprehensive after Liu Yun's staff members Gong Tingmei (鞏廷美) and Yang Wen (楊溫), who had held out against Later Zhou at Wuning's capital Xu Prefecture (徐州), were defeated and killed. He secretly communicated with Northern Han and Southern Tang, hoping for joint action. Guo sent his attendant Zheng Haoqian (鄭好謙) to try to comfort Murong, but that made Murong more apprehensive, although Murong also sent his officer Zheng Lin (鄭麟) to the capital to both show allegiance and to scout the capital's preparedness. He further submitted letters he forged, purportedly from Gao Xingzhou (who was then the military governor of Tianping), defaming Guo and seeking an alliance with Murong. Guo, knowing that the letters must be forgeries, presented them to Gao and prepared to act against Murong if/when Murong rebelled. When Murong requested permission to come to the capital to pay homage to Guo, Guo approved the request, and Murong subsequently reneged, claiming that there was banditry in the circuit and therefore he could not leave.

In spring 952, Murong openly rebelled, against the advice of his assistant Cui Zhoudu (崔周度). He gathered the local militias and had them supplement Yan's defense, and diverted the Si River's waters to fill the moat around Yan. Believing that the god of Saturn would bless him, he built a shrine dedicated to Saturn. He also had his officers encourage bandits to pillage the surrounding circuits. Guo sent the imperial guard general Cao Ying (曹英) to command the troops against Murong. Southern Tang's emperor Li Jing launched an army of 5,000 to try to aid Murong, but it was quickly repelled by Xu Prefecture's overseer Zhang Lingbin (張令彬) and withdrew. Meanwhile, Northern Han had already ended its siege of Jin, leaving the Later Zhou military free to concentrate on Murong. Subsequently, when Cao arrived at Yan, he began to build a wall to surround it. When Murong tried to attack Cao's army, Cao's subordinate Yao Yuanfu (藥元福) repeatedly repelled Murong's attack. Soon, the wall was complete, and the Later Zhou army began its assault. Murong gathered the wealth of the city to give to his soldiers, to try to keep their morale high, and when he suspected the retired officer Yan Honglu (閻弘魯) of hiding wealth, he tortured Yan and Yan's wife to death, and then, believing that Cui had not searched for Yan's wealth properly, put Cui to death as well.

With Yan not falling as of summer 952, Guo decided to go there to oversee the siege himself. When he arrived at Yan, he tried to persuade Murong to surrender, but Murong's soldiers responded insolently. Guo then ordered a general assault. Many of Murong's soldiers surrendered. Eventually, the city fell, while Murong was at the shrine to Saturn. His personal guards still tried to battle, but could not prevail. Murong then burned the shrine and committed suicide with his wife by jumping into a well. His son Murong Jixun (慕容繼勳) tried to flee, but was captured and executed. The Later Zhou army pillaged the city, and more than 10,000 died.

== Notes and references ==
- Old History of the Five Dynasties, vol. 101.
- New History of the Five Dynasties, vol. 53.
- Zizhi Tongjian, vols. 284, 285, 287, 288, 289, 290.
