= Wangchang =

Wangchang may refer to the following places:

- Wangchang Gewog, a gewog (village group) in Paro District, Bhutan

== Places in China ==
- Wangchang, Chongqing (王场), a town in Shizhu Tujia Autonomous County, Chongqing
- Wangchang, Qianjiang (王场), a town in Qianjiang, Hubei
- Wangchang, Tianmen (汪场), a town in Tianmen, Hubei
- Wangchang, Sichuan (王场), a town in Chongzhou, Sichuan
- Wangchang Township (王常乡), a township in Zaoqiang County, Hebei

== See also ==
- Wang Chang (disambiguation) for a list of people
- Wanchang (disambiguation)
- Wangcheng (disambiguation)
