= Wanzhou (disambiguation) =

Wanzhou District is a district in Chongqing, China and the site of a former prefecture.

Wanzhou or Wan Prefecture (萬州) may also refer to:

- Wanzhou, a former prefecture in roughly modern Bazhong, Sichuan, China
- Wanzhou, a former prefecture in roughly modern Wanning, Hainan, China
