= Shi Hongzhao =

Shi Hongzhao (Chinese: 史弘肇) (died December 24, 950), courtesy name Huayuan (化元), formally the Prince of Zheng (鄭王) (as posthumously honored during Later Zhou), was a major general of the Chinese Five Dynasties and Ten Kingdoms Period Later Han state. Shi was one of the key officials that Later Han's founding emperor Liu Zhiyuan (Emperor Gaozu) left in charge of the government during the youth of his son and successor Liu Chengyou (Emperor Yin), but Liu Chengyou eventually tired of these officials' governance and had Shi killed, along with Yang Bin and Wang Zhang.

== Background ==
It is not known when Shi Hongzhao was born, but it is known that he was from Yingze (滎澤, in modern Zhengzhou, Henan). His father, Shi Pan (史潘), was a farmer. In Shi Hongzhao's youth, he spent his days roving around his home territory, trying to be heroic, and not engaging in a trade. He became good at fighting with his fists and walking fast, being able to cover 200 Li in a day.

Toward the end of Later Liang, there was a conscription where every seven households were to contribute one soldier. Shi Hongzhao was conscripted at that time. He was later placed in the Kaidao Corps (開道) of Zheng Prefecture (鄭州), which Yingze belonged to, and yet later made a soldier of the Later Liang imperial guards. During the time of the subsequent Later Tang, he once served under the general Shi Jingtang, and Shi Jingtang kept him as a personal guard. After Shi Jingtang later became emperor of the succeeding state of Later Jin, Shi Hongzhao became an officer in the imperial guard's Konghe Corps (控鶴). When the major general Liu Zhiyuan became the military governor (Jiedushi) of Hedong Circuit (河東, headquartered in modern Taiyuan, Shanxi) in 941, he requested that Shi Hongzhao be assigned to him, and he promoted Shi Hongzhao to be an officer of his headquarter guards. Later, when he established the two Wujie Corps (武節), he made Shi their overall commander, also carrying the honorary title of prefect of Lei Prefecture (雷州, in modern Zhanjiang, Guangdong — then ruled by Southern Han).

== During Liu Zhiyuan's reign ==
=== During Liu's campaign to capture the Central Plains ===
In 947, Later Jin was destroyed by the invading troops of the Khitan Liao dynasty, whose Emperor Taizong then claimed to be the emperor of China as well. Liu Zhiyuan initially postured that he would submit to Liao, but was preparing to rise to resist. He claimed to his soldiers that he was going to launch troops to rescue Later Jin's emperor Shi Chonggui (Shi Jingtang's nephew and successor), whom Liao troops were delivering to Liao proper, and he had Shi Hongzhao gather them and inform them of that. The soldiers wanted Liu to take the throne immediately, but Liu declined at that time.

Shortly after, Liu declared himself emperor — and while he did not initially declare a name for his state, it would later be known as Later Han. He sent Shi to attack Dai Prefecture (代州, in modern Xinzhou, Shanxi), which Shi quickly captured, killing the Liao-commission prefect Wang Hui (王暉). Shortly after, when Liu issued a number of commissions for his officers, Shi was made the military governor of Zhongwu Circuit (忠武, headquartered in modern Xuchang, Henan) and the commander of infantry troops. Soon after, when the Liao-commissioned military governor of Zhaoyi Circuit (昭義, headquartered in modern Changzhi, Shanxi), Geng Chongmei (耿崇美), was heading for Zhaoyi's capital Lu Prefecture (潞州) (which was apparently still held by subordinates of the prior Later Jin-commissioned military governor Zhang Cong'en (張從恩)), Liu sent Shi with 10,000 men to aid the Lu garrison against Geng, with the intent that Shi's troops would serve as his forward troops in his advance toward Luoyang and Daliang — as Liao's Emperor Taizong had already left the region and was on the way back to Liao proper. Shi reached Lu before Geng could, and Geng decided to retreat. Shi sent his officer Ma Hui (馬誨) to chase and attack Geng, defeating Geng's troops. Geng and other Liao generals Cui Tingxun (崔廷勳) and Zhuaila (拽剌) withdrew to Huai Prefecture (懷州, in modern Jiaozuo, Henan).

Liu then launched his troops, heading toward Shi's position to rendezvous with him. Before Liu's arrival, Shi attacked Ze Prefecture (澤州, in modern Jincheng, Shanxi), but was initially unable to capture it against the defense by the Liao-commissioned prefect Zhai Lingqi (翟令奇). Liu, fearing that Shi's troops were too few in number, considered recalling him, despite the opposition of his staff members Su Fengji and Yang Bin. When he sent a messenger to consult with Shi, however, Shi pointed out that retreat would be viewed as a sign of weakness, and thereafter Liu agreed to let him continue the siege of Ze. Soon, Shi sent his officer Li Wanchao (李萬超) to convince Zhai to surrender. After Zhai surrendered, he left Li in charge of Ze, and continued his advance.

Shi approached Heyang Circuit (河陽, headquartered in modern Luoyang), whose military governor Wu Xingde (武行德) had already agreed to submit to Liu, and who was therefore being under siege by Cui, Geng, and Zhuaila. Hearing that Shi was about to arrive, Cui, Geng, and Zhuaila lifted the siege on Heyang and retreated to Huai, allowing Shi to join forces with Wu. Soon thereafter, Liu was able to enter Luoyang and then Daliang without much difficulty. The Song dynasty historical work, Zizhi Tongjian, comments this about Shi:

Shi Hongzhao was decisive and quiet, and was strict in troop discipline. If his officers did not follow his orders, he would pound them to death immediately. If his soldiers, while marching, damaged farmers' fields or tied horses to trees [(i.e., allowed horses to graze from farmers' fields)], he would decapitate them. Therefore, the soldiers were apprehensive and did not dare to disobey him, and therefore, wherever he went, he was victorious. It was due to Shi Hongzhao's achievement that the Emperor was able to safely advance from Jinyang [(i.e., Taiyuan)] to Luoyang and Bian [(i.e., Daliang)] without having blood on his soldiers' swords. Therefore, the Emperor depended on and loved him.

=== After Later Han's firm establishment ===
In late 947, after a rebellion by Du Chongwei ended with Du's capitulation, Liu Zhiyuan made a number of movements of his generals. As part of these orders, Shi Hongzhao was moved from Zhongwu to Guide Circuit (歸德, headquartered in modern Shangqiu, Henan), but remained at the capital Daliang to serve as the overall commander of infantry and cavalry imperial guard soldiers, with Liu Zhiyuan's younger brother or cousin Liu Xin (劉信) serving as Shi's deputy as well as the military governor of Zhongwu. He was also given the honorary chancellor title Tong Zhongshu Menxia Pingzhangshi (同中書門下平章事).

In spring 948, Liu Zhiyuan fell seriously ill. He entrusted his son Liu Chengyou to Su Fengji, Yang Bin, Shi, and Guo Wei. He stated to them, "My remaining breaths are getting short, and I cannot speak much. Chengyou is young and weak, so what happens after my death has to be entrusted to you." He also told them to guard against Du Chongwei. After Liu Zhiyuan died the same day, these officials, without announcing his death, had Du and his sons put to death. Liu Chengyou was created the Prince of Zhou, and shortly after, when Liu Zhiyuan's death was announced, Liu Chengyou succeeded him as emperor.

== During Liu Chengyou's reign ==
=== Participation in the group leadership of the government ===
During Liu Chengyou's administration, there was a split of authorities among the high level officials. Yang Bin oversaw the governmental operations; Guo Wei oversaw military operations; Shi Hongzhao oversaw the imperial guards; and Wang Zhang oversaw the financial agencies. Su Fengji, Su Yugui, and Dou Zhengu served as chancellors.

Shortly after Liu Zhiyuan's death, Shi's mother died. However, instead of observing a lengthy mourning period, he returned to his duties in a few days. Liu Chengyou then formally recalled him to governmental service, and gave him the greater honorary chancellor title of Shizhong (侍中).

At that time, Later Han's laws were very strict, and Shi was said to be particularly cruel in his punishments. He trusted his treasurer Xie Hui (解暉), who was particularly efficient at torturing those who are arrested and placed in military jails (which were under Shi's jurisdiction), such that the prisoners would always confess after the torturing. Shi was also responsible for security at the capital, as part of his responsibility in commanding the imperial guards. Under his orders, if the soldiers arrested suspected, they would execute most of them, no matter how serious or non-serious the offenses were, without giving the suspects the chance to appeal. Those who were not killed would have their mouths lacerated, their tongues cut, their tendons cut, or their feet broken. As a result, while crimes disappeared, many innocent people died. Shi disliked learned civilians, often telling others, "Those people take things lightly, and often refer to people like us as just soldiers." He entrusted the taxation of Guide Circuit to his close associate Yang Yi (楊乙), and Yang abused his power, such that the entire circuit feared him as much as it feared Shi, even including Shi's deputy military governor. He delivered an overabundance of funds to Shi, such that the people greatly suffered. His son Shi Dechong (史德珫), however, was learned, and often disliked Shi Hongzhao's behavior. On one occasion, when an imperial examinee was causing a disturbance outside the hall of examinations, Su Fengji ordered that the examinee be arrested and delivered to Shi's headquarters, hoping that Shi would have him battered and tattooed. Shi Dechong, however, told Shi Hongzhao, "When an examinee is rude, there are civilian agencies to punish him; this is not a matter of the military. This is how the civilian officials want to expose your faults, Lord." Shi Hongzhao agreed and released the examinee.

In 949, after Guo defeated the rebellion of the major general Li Shouzhen, Guo declined to be individually rewarded, so the other high-level officials and regional governors were all rewarded. As part of the rewards, Shi was given the greater honorary chancellor title Zhongshu Ling (中書令).

=== Breakdown in the group leadership structure ===
In summer 950, an incident occurred to damage the relationship between the leading officials. They had discussed and resolved that, because of frequent Liao incursions and the inability for the circuits to coordinate their defenses, Guo Wei should be sent to Yedu (鄴都, in modern Handan, Hebei) to serve as its defender (as well as the military governor of Tianxiong Circuit (天雄, headquartered at Yedu) to coordinate the defense against Liao. Shi advocated that Guo be allowed to continue to retain his title as chief of staff (Shumishi) (a title that Yang Bin also carried) to allow him to give orders to the military governors. Su Fengji opposed, pointing out that there had been no precedent to allow a military governor to continue to retain chief of staff title. Eventually, Liu Chengyou approved Shi's proposal. When Shi then complained to Su about his opposition, Su responded, "Letting the central government control the outlying circuits is proper. How can it be that now you are letting an outlying circuit control the central government?"

It was at the send-off dinner for Guo the next day, at the mansion of Dou Zhengu, that frictions within the imperial government came to the forefront. At the feast, Shi, when toasting Guo, spoke in a harsh voice, "How could there have been opposition when we discussed this matter yesterday at the imperial gathering? Now, let us drink, younger brother [(i.e., Guo)]!" Su and Yang also raised their cups and stated, "This is an important matter for the state. Do not bear grudges!" Shi responded, again in a harsh voice, "To settle the state, it takes long spears and large swords. What use does the ink brush have?" Wang Zhang responded, "Without ink brushes, where does money come from?" It was said that from this point on, there were increasing tension between generals and chancellors. Later, when Guo was about to leave the capital, he went to see Liu Chengyou and stated to him:

The Empress Dowager had long followed the deceased Emperor, and she has experienced many things. Your Imperial Majesty is your prime years. If there are important matters, it is best to ask her advice and follow it. You should be close to the faithful and honest, and be far away from the slanderous and the wicked. Be careful in examining between good and evil. Su Fengji, Yang Bin, and Shi Hongzhao are all the deceased Emperor's old subjects. They are faithful and caring for the state. May it be that Your Imperial Majesty trust them and use them, and there will be no trouble. As far as what happens on the battlefield, I, your subject, wishes to expend all of my foolish and foolhardy efforts, hopefully being worthy of your service.

Liu Chengyou showed a serious expression and thanked Guo. However, the tension between the officials continued. Not long after Guo's departure, Wang Zhang hosted a feast for the honored officials. During the feast, there was a drinking game that Shi was unfamiliar with. The director of diplomatic protocol, Yan Jinqing (閻晉卿), was seated next to Shi, and repeatedly reminded him of what the game's rules were. Su joked, "When you are seated next to someone named Yan, you need not fear being punished." However, Shi took the comment badly — as he thought that Su was satirizing his wife Lady Yan, who was once a prostitute working in a drinking hall. He cursed Su, and when Su did not respond, got up and wanted to batter Su. As a response, Su left, and he took a sword and considered chasing after Su. Yang wept and urged him to stop, stating, "Lord Su is a chancellor. If you, Lord, killed him, what kind of a place are you putting the Son of Heaven into? Please think carefully!" Shi thereafter got on a horse and left, and Yang followed him on a horse as well, not leaving him until he reached his manor. When Liu Chengyou heard of this, he sent the director of palace affairs, Wang Jun, to try to moderate, but could not repair the relationship between them. Su considered requesting an assignment as a circuit military governor, but then decided that if he left the capital, Shi could easily destroy him, and so did not. Wang, however, did request such an assignment, but Yang and Shi urged him against leaving the capital.

By winter 950, Liu Chengyou himself had tired of the control the senior officials had on his government, even though, under Yang's leadership, the imperial government was considered well-run, and Shi's overseeing of the capital made it safe for the public. Part of the friction came from how his close associates and relatives of the empress dowager were trying to gain power, but were being thwarted by Yang and Shi. At that time, Empress Dowager Li's younger brother Li Ye (李業) was serving as the director of miscellaneous affairs (武德使, Wudeshi) inside the palace, but wanted to be promoted to the higher position of director of palace affairs, a desire that Liu Chengyou and Empress Dowager Li were both in concurrence with, but Yang and Shi considered inappropriate as he lacked the seniority, so they stopped his commission. Further, Hou Kuangzan (後匡贊) the director of imperial stables, Guo Yunming (郭允明) the director of tea and wine, and Nie Wenjin (聶文進) the liaison officer at the office of the chiefs of staff, were all favored by Liu Chengyou, but had long not been promoted, causing them to be resentful. When Liu Chengyou wanted to make his favorite concubine Consort Geng empress, Yang considered it too quick after the expiration of his morning period for Liu Zhiyuan, and so opposed it. When Consort Geng died, Yang opposed Liu Chengyou's wishes to have her buried with the ceremonies due an empress. Further, there was an occasion when Yang and Shi were discussing state matters with Liu Chengyou, Liu Chengyou made the comment, "Be careful! Do not let others get a chance to criticize you!" Yang responded, "Your Imperial Majesty should just be quiet. Your subjects are still here." This led to Liu Chengyou's resentment toward them, and his close associates thereafter falsely accused Yang and the others of plotting against him. As Su resented Shi, he also incited Li Ye and the others.

Liu Chengyou, thereafter, plotted with Li Ye, Nie, Hou, and Guo Yunming to kill Yang and the others. Liu Chengyou reported his plans to Empress Dowager Li, who responded, "How can such things be easily considered! You should discuss with the chancellors further." However, Li Ye then stated, "The deceased Emperor had said before that the matters of the state should not be discussed with scholars. Their timidity will ruin you." When Empress Dowager Li tried to speak again, Liu Chengyou responded angrily, "The matters of state cannot be decided in the halls of a woman!"

On December 24, 950, as the officials were arriving at the palace for the imperial gathering, a number of soldiers appeared and killed Yang, Shi, and Wang Zhang. Subsequently, Liu Chengyou declared that they had committed treason, and stated to the chancellors and the other officials, "Yang Bin and the others viewed us as a young child. We finally now get to be your true lord. You should not worry!" He sent soldiers to arrest and kill the relatives and close associates of Yang, Shi, and Wang. Later, after Guo overthrew Liu Chengyou and established Later Zhou, Guo posthumously created Shi as the Prince of Zheng.

== Notes and references ==
- Old History of the Five Dynasties, vol. 107.
- New History of the Five Dynasties, vol. 30.
- Zizhi Tongjian, vols. 286, 287, 288, 289.
