= Du Chongwei =

Chinese general

Du Chongwei (杜重威) (died March 13, 948), known as Du Wei (杜威) during the reign of Shi Chonggui, was a Chinese military general and politician of the Five Dynasties and Ten Kingdoms Period Later Jin state, as a brother-in-law to its founding emperor Shi Jingtang and uncle to Shi Jingtang's successor (adoptive son and biological nephew) Shi Chonggui. He, however, would betray Shi Chonggui and surrender to Later Jin's rival, the Khitan state Liao's Emperor Taizong, hoping that Emperor Taizong would make him the emperor of China, and would later rebel against the succeeding Later Han state's founding emperor Liu Zhiyuan. He eventually surrendered again to Later Han but was executed at Liu Zhiyuan's directions following Liu Zhiyuan's death. He was one of the reviled figures of the Five Dynasties and Ten Kingdoms Period, due to his treachery and mistreatment of the people.

== Background ==
It is not known when Du Chongwei was born. His family was originally from Shuo Prefecture (朔州, in modern Shuozhou, Shanxi), and his grandfather Du Xing (杜興) served as an officer of Zhenwu Circuit (振武, headquartered at Shuo Prefecture). His father Du Duijin (杜堆金) served as a forward commander for the major late-Tang warlord Li Keyong the military governor (Jiedushi) of Hedong Circuit (河東, headquartered in modern Taiyuan, Shanxi), however, and it was apparently during that time the family moved to Hedong's capital Taiyuan. In Du Chongwei's youth, he served under Li Keyong's adoptive son Li Siyuan.

== During Later Tang ==
During Li Siyuan's reign as the emperor of Later Tang, Du Chongwei served as an officer in the imperial guards, and received the title of prefect of Fang Prefecture (防州 — unclear where it was, most likely in modern Liaoning, but in any case an honorary title only as that prefecture was under the control of Khitan Empire). By this point, he was married to a younger sister of the general Shi Jingtang, who was a son-in-law of Li Siyuan's.

== During Later Jin ==
=== During Shi Jingtang's reign ===
In 936, Shi Jingtang, then the military governor of Hedong, rose against then-Later Tang emperor Li Congke (Li Siyuan's adoptive son) and, with aid from Khitan Empire's Emperor Taizong, was able to defeat Later Tang troops, causing Li Congke to commit suicide and ending Later Tang. Shi became emperor of a new state of Later Jin, formally subordinate to the Khitan. Du Chongwei's activities during the war between Li Congke and Shi were unclear, but after Shi's victory, he made Du an imperial guard general and had Du also carry the honorary title of prefect of Shu Prefecture (舒州, in modern Anqing, Anhui, then the territory of Later Jin's southeastern neighbor Wu). Du's wife (Shi's younger sister) was created the Grand Princess Leping.

In 937, Fan Yanguang the military governor of Tianxiong Circuit (天雄, headquartered in modern Handan, Hebei) rose against Shi's rule. He was soon joined in rebellion by Zhang Congbin (張從賓), who rose at Luoyang. Shi sent Du and Hou Yi (侯益) against Zhang, and they defeated Zhang; Zhang drowned when he tried to retreat. (During this campaign, Shi made Du the military governor of Zhaoyi Circuit (昭義, headquartered in modern Changzhi, Shanxi), but kept him as a general of the imperial guards.) Du subsequently served under Yang Guangyuan in the campaign against Fan, eventually resulting in Fan's surrender. He was then made the military governor of Zhongwu Circuit (忠武, headquartered in modern Xuchang, Henan), but continued to serve as a general of the imperial guards.

In 939, Shi bestowed honorary chancellor designations of Tong Zhongshu Menxia Pingzhangshi (同中書門下平章事) on both Du and another imperial guard general, Liu Zhiyuan the military governor of Guide Circuit (歸德, headquartered in modern Shangqiu, Henan). Liu, whose battlefield accomplishments greatly helped Shi in the establishment of Later Jin, felt insulted — as he believed that Du was only reaching his position due to the marital relationship, and therefore did not want to be mentioned in the same edict as Du – and therefore initially declined repeatedly. This led to Shi's being angered and considering removing Liu altogether, but the chancellor Zhao Ying defused the situation, and subsequently, Shi sent the imperial scholar He Ning to persuade Liu to accept.

Du's military governorship was subsequently changed to that of Tianping Circuit (天平, headquartered in modern Tai'an, Shandong). In 941, at the recommendation of the chancellors Li Song and Feng Dao, Shi sent Liu, who was then the commander of all imperial guards, out of the capital Kaifeng to serve as the military governor of Hedong, while replacing him with Du. It was said that because of this, Liu resented Li and Feng. It was said at the time that Du was exacting of the people's wealth, and that wherever he served, the people often fled his jurisdiction. This led to a comment he made when visiting a market, "Some say that I chase away the people. How come there are still so many people here at the market?"

In late 941, An Chongrong the military governor of Chengde Circuit (成德, headquartered in modern Shijiazhuang, Hebei) rebelled against Shi. Shi sent Du and Ma Quanjie (馬全節) against him. Du's and An's army met and battled near Zongcheng (宗城, in modern Xingtai, Hebei). During the encounter, An initially successfully repelled two attacks by Du, and Du considered withdrawing. The officer Wang Chongyin (王重胤), however, convinced him that retreating may lead to a general panic, and he therefore did not do so. Instead, as Wang suggested, he attacked An's army on three fronts. At this point, An's key officer Zhao Yanzhi (趙彥之) surrendered to him (although his soldiers killed Zhao anyway), leading to a panic in An's army and allowing Du to crush his army. An fled back to Chengde's capital Zhen Prefecture (鎮州), and Du then put it under siege. Shortly after, an officer of An's allowed Du's army to enter Zhen and execute An. Du, however, killed that officer so that he could claim credit for capturing the city. Shi then renamed Zhen to Heng, and Chengde to Shunguo (順國), and then made Du Shunguo's military governor. Du seized both An's personal wealth and the circuit treasury to be his own personal wealth, and while Shi knew this, he did nothing about it. Du's deputy military governor Wang Yu (王瑜) was also harsh and corrupt, such that the people of Heng were oppressed.

=== During Shi Chonggui's reign ===
Shi Jingtang died later in 942, and was succeeded by his adoptive son and biological nephew (biological son of his older brother Shi Jingru (石敬儒)) Shi Chonggui — who was therefore a nephew by marriage of Du Chongwei's. (During Shi Chonggui's reign, Du Chongwei became known as Du Wei, to observe naming taboo for Shi Chonggui.)

Instead of the submissive stance that Shi Jingtang took toward Khitan (which had renamed its state Liao by this point), Shi Chonggui, at the advice of his chancellor Jing Yanguang, took a confrontational stance against Liao, only willing to refer to himself as "grandson" (as Shi Jingtang had claimed himself to be "son") and not "subject" as to Emperor Taizong. He further executed many Liao merchants in Later Jin territory and seized their possessions. Confrontations against Liao thus loomed. Further, it happened at the time that there were droughts, floods, and locust-driven famines throughout various parts of the Later Jin realm. Shi Chonggui ordered that all the excess food that the people had held onto were to be requisitioned for state use. While his edict exempted Shunguo and Yiwu (義武, headquartered in modern Baoding, Hebei) Circuits, Du nevertheless reported that his own army needed the food supplies, and therefore was nevertheless allowed to seize food supplies from the people. Altogether, he seized one million Hu (斛) of grain, but only reported to Shi that he seized 300,000 Hu — with the remainder taken into his own personal wealth.

By that point, the Later Jin imperial government was in a tense standoff with Yang Guangyuan, who was then the military governor of Pinglu Circuit (平盧, headquartered in modern Weifang, Shandong), with Yang displeased that his powers were being curbed by Jing, and therefore was secretly negotiating with Emperor Taizong, hoping for Liao support for him to displace Later Jin. In late 943, Yang, in preparation for his rebellion, secretly ordered his son Yang Chengzuo (楊承祚), who was then the prefect of Dan Prefecture (單州, in modern Heze, Shandong), to flee back to Pinglu's capital Qing Prefecture (青州). In spring 944, Du tried to defuse the situation by sending his staff member Cao Guangyi (曹光裔) as an emissary to Yang, trying to persuade Yang not to rebel. Yang initially promised that he was not intending to rebel, such that Shi believed his promise and tried to negotiate with him further. However, Emperor Taizong, around the same time, already launched Liao troops to aid Yang, and so Yang rebelled anyway. During the subsequent campaign, during which Shi ordered a number of generals to the north to resist the Liao invasion while sending Li Shouzhen to attack Yang, Du was titularly the second in command of this anti-Liao army, under Liu Zhiyuan. The Liao army was soon repelled, and Li Shouzhen's siege on Qing caused Yang Guangyuan's son Yang Chengxun (楊承勳) to put Yang Guangyuan under house arrest and then surrender.

In late 944, Emperor Taizong launched another major incursion into Later Jin territory, inflicting much damage on the Later Jin populace north of the Yellow River. As the Liao army withdrew in spring 945, Shi sent Du and Li Shouzhen in command of an army to give chase. They crossed into Liao territory and captured Qi (祁州) and Tai (泰州) (both in modern Baoding), but soon received news that the Liao army had turned around and was heading for them. They tried to withdraw, but became surrounded near Yangcheng (陽城, in modern Baoding). Du panicked and was reluctant to engage the Liao army, but at Fu Yanqing's advocacy, Fu, Zhang Yanze, Yao Yuanfu (藥元福), and Huangfu Yu (皇甫遇), attacked the Liao army fiercely, causing the Liao army to panic and flee.

However, despite this victory, it was said that Du continued to misgovern Shunguo, as he continued to extract wealth from the people. Further, whenever the Liao army pillaged the towns of the circuit (as Shunguo was on the Later Jin/Liao border), he, fearing them, would not launch any forces to aid the towns, such that many of the Shunguo towns were slaughtered. Continuing to fear the possibility of a Liao invasion and the resentment from the people, he, in summer 945, simply abandoned his post without prior imperial approval and returned to Kaifeng. Shi's chief of staff (Shumishi) Sang Weihan greatly advocated punishing Du, but Shi, as he saw Du as an uncle, refused. Sang thereafter resigned in exasperation. When Du arrived at Kaifeng, he "offered" his wealth (which he had left at Heng Prefecture) to the emperor, and then requested, through his wife (who was then carrying the title of Grand Princess of Song), to be the military governor of Tianxiong. Shi agreed. Despite this episode, when the imperial official Wang Qinzuo (王欽祚) was subsequently sent to Shunguo to serve as its acting military governor, and Wang took Du's stored grains for the circuit's use, Du objected angrily, arguing that it was his own personal wealth, such that Shi compensated Du and recalled Wang.

In 946, there were rumors that the major Liao general Zhao Yanshou — who had previously been a major Later Tang general before being captured by the Khitan in the campaign that led to Later Tang's destruction — was planning on defecting to Later Jin. This rumor was believed by Shi's chiefs of staff Li Song and Feng Yu (the brother of Shi's wife Empress Feng). They had Du write a letter to Zhao, encouraging him to do so, with the officer Zhao Xingshi (趙行實), who had previously served under Zhao Yanshou, delivering the letter. Zhao Yanshou wrote back (to try to lead Later Jin forces into a trap), stating, "I have long been in a foreign land, and I want to return to China. Please launch a major army to support me, so that I can pull myself out and return with it." Subsequently, under Emperor Taizong's orders, Liao's prefect of Ying Prefecture (瀛州, in modern Cangzhou), Liu Yanzuo (劉延祚), also offered to defect to Later Jin. Shi thus put Du and Li Shouzhen in command of an army to attack north, with the stated objectives being to first recapture the prefectures Shi Jingtang previously ceded to Liao (the Sixteen Prefectures), and then to destroy Liao. (Zhao Ying, however, had reservations, pointing out that Du, despite his honored position, was still often dissatisfied with his station, and therefore suggested to Li Song and Feng that Li Shouzhen be put in command by himself; Zhao Ying's suggestions were not listened to, however.) When Du and Li Shouzhen advanced, though, they were met by a large army that Emperor Taizong personally commanded. The Liao army eventually surrounded the Later Jin army at Zhongdu Bridge (中度橋, in modern Baoding). After Emperor Taizong made the promise to Du to make him emperor if he surrendered, Du and Li Shouzhen surrendered their army. (As part of accepting Du's surrender, Emperor Taizong had Zhao mockingly put an imperial robe on Du.) Emperor Taizong then prepared to advance south. He commissioned Du acting Taifu (太傅) and the defender of Tianxiong's capital Yedu (鄴都), and had Du accompany him south. With virtually the entire Later Jin army having been given to Du and Li Shouzhen for this northern campaign, Kaifeng was left essentially defenseless, and Shi Chonggui felt compelled to surrender, ending Later Jin. Emperor Taizong subsequently entered Daliang.

== During the Liao occupation ==
Emperor Taizong soon claimed to also be the emperor of China. He distrusted the Later Jin imperial troops that surrendered with Du Chongwei, believing that he made a mistake in having given those troops to Shi Jingtang and allowing those troops to be subsequently used by Shi Chonggui in resisting him. He considered, but initially hesitated, in slaughtering them, so he stationed them at Chenqiao (陳橋, in modern Xinxiang, Henan) while deciding what to do with them, with Du still in command. However, despite the fact that it was snow season, he gave them insufficient supplies, such that the soldiers were going cold and hungry; they were resentful of Du, and they often gathered to curse him, as did the local populace whenever Du came out of his headquarters. Emperor Taizong's thoughts of slaughtering the soldiers only came to rest when Zhao Yanshou pointed out that doing so would leave the former Later Jin territory defenseless against invasions by Later Shu and Southern Tang (Wu's successor state). Emperor Taizong required the former Later Jin officials and generals to offer substantial parts of their wealth to continue the upkeep of the military, but Du complained, pointing out that he surrendered the entire army to Liao already. Emperor Taizong laughed and exempted him.

Emperor Taizong also distrusted the former Later Jin military governors, and after they came to Kaifeng to pay homage to him and show submission, he kept them at Kaifeng for quite some time, not sending them back to their circuits. This left a power vacuum in the circuits, and many rebellions rose against Liao rule in response to his harsh rule — including allowing the Liao soldiers to freely pillage the countryside. It was not until this began to occur that Emperor Taizong began sending some of the military governors back to their circuits, including Du and Li Shouzhen. Emperor Taizong soon tired of dealing with these rebellions, and he left his brother-in-law Xiao Han in charge of Kaifeng as the military governor of Xuanwu Circuit (宣武), while heading back to Liao proper himself. On the way, when he went through Yedu, Du and his wife (the former princess) went to the Liao camp to pay homage to him.

== During Later Han ==
Meanwhile, Liu Zhiyuan declared himself the emperor of a new state of Later Han at Taiyuan, and the rebel forces against Liao gradually submitted to him, allowing him to take over most of the former Later Jin territory after the gradual Liao withdrawal (coupled with Emperor Taizong's death and succession by his nephew Emperor Shizong).

Du Chongwei initially offered to submit to Liu as well, and further offered to be transferred to another circuit. In summer 947, Liu issued orders swapping his position with that of Gao Xingzhou the military governor of Guide. However, Du's offer was merely a test to see what Liu's intentions were toward him, and upon Liu's orders, he resisted and requested aid from the Liao general Yelü Mada (耶律麻荅), whom Emperor Shizong left in charge of Heng, then still under Liao control. Yelü Mada sent a mixed Khitan and Han Chinese army (with the Han component coming from their having been personal guards for Zhao Yanshou and were from Lulong Circuit (盧龍, headquartered in modern Beijing), which was part of the land that Shi Jingtang cedd to Liao) to help Du defend Yedu. Liu commissioned Gao as the commander of an army against Du, with Liu's half-brother Murong Yanchao serving as Gao's deputy. Murong, however, doubted Gao's faithfulness as Gao's daughter was Du's daughter-in-law, and so there was discord among them. Liu decided to command the siege himself, and he shortly after arrived at Yedu. Du initially claimed that once Liu arrived, he would submit, but when Liu arrived, continued to defend the city. As the food supplies dwindled, many of Du's soldiers surrendered to the Later Han army, but for quite some time the defense held, particularly because the Lulong soldiers, under the command of the officer Zhang Lian (張璉), were highly motivated after hearing that Liu had slaughtered a group of Lulong soldiers at Kaifeng. By winter 947, however, the city was in desperate situation, and Du sent, successively, his officer Wang Min (王敏), his son Du Honglian (杜弘璉), and his wife, to meet with Liu, offering to surrender. Liu accepted his surrender. By that point, some 70-80% of the populace had died of starvation. While Liu spared Du, he, at the suggestion of his general Guo Wei, killed some 100 of Du's officers. Further, while Liu had offered Zhang free passage, he instead arrested and killed Zhang, although he allowed Zhang's soldiers to return to Lulong. He also seized Du's wealth to use it to supply the army.

Liu created Du the Duke of Chu and gave him the titles of Taifu and Zhongshu Ling (中書令), and kept him at Kaifeng. By this point, Du had become so despised by the populace that whenever he was out in public, the people would throw stones and bricks at him.

In spring 948, Liu was deathly ill. He entrusted his son Liu Chengyou, who was to succeed him, to a group of high level officials and generals — Su Fengji, Yang Bin, Shi Hongzhao, and Guo. As part of his instructions, he stated, "Be careful of Du Chongwei!" After he died shortly after, this group of regents did not immediately announce his death. Rather, they issued an edict in his name, ordering that Du and his sons Du Hongzhang (杜弘璋), Du Honglian, and Du Hongcan (杜弘璨) be put to death. The former princess and other relatives were spared. Du Chongwei's corpse was displayed in the open and cut into pieces. The people rushed to cannibalize him to show their disgust at him, and soon, the flesh was all gone.

== Notes and references ==
- Old History of the Five Dynasties, vol. 109.
- New History of the Five Dynasties, vol. 52.
- Zizhi Tongjian, vols. 281, 282, 283, 284, 285, 286, 287.
