= Wang Zhang =

Later Han official

Wang Zhang (Chinese: 王章) (died December 24, 950) was an official of the Chinese Five Dynasties and Ten Kingdoms Period state Later Han. Wang was one of the key officials that Later Han's founding emperor Liu Zhiyuan (Emperor Gaozu) left in charge of the government during the youth of his son and successor Liu Chengyou (Emperor Yin), but Liu Chengyou eventually tired of these officials' governance and had Wang killed, along with Yang Bin and Shi Hongzhao.

== Background ==
It is not known when Wang Zhang was born, but it is known that he was from Nanle (南樂, in modern Puyang, Henan). In his youth, he served as an administrator at the headquarters of the military governor (Jiedushi) of Tianxiong Circuit (天雄, headquartered in modern Handan, Hebei), which Nanle was a part of. Early in the Tongguang era (923-926) of the Later Tang emperor Li Cunxu, he served for some time at the office of the emperor's chiefs of staff, but later returned to Tianxiong and became the circuit's treasurer. At some point, he married the daughter of the general Bai Wenke (白文珂). He did not have any sons by Lady Bai or anyone else, but did have one daughter.

In 936, during the reign of Later Tang's last emperor Li Congke (Li Cunxu's adoptive nephew), the officer Zhang Lingzhao (張令昭) mutinied at Tianxiong, expelled the military governor Liu Yanhao, and claimed the title of acting military governor. Wang served as the public works officer (in addition to being the treasurer) under Zhang during Zhang's mutiny. Soon, Li Congke sent the general Fan Yanguang to suppress Zhang's mutiny, and Fan quickly captured Tianxiong's capital Wei Prefecture (魏州) and executed Zhang. He also sought to find and execute Zhang's followers. As Bai Wenke was friendly with Fan's deputy Li Zhou (李周), Bai asked Li Zhou to save Wang. Li Zhou thus located and hid Wang, and had him delivered to Li Zhou's mansion at the capital Luoyang in secret and continued to hide him there.

Later in 936, Later Tang was overthrown in a rebellion by the general Shi Jingtang, who established Later Jin and took over Later Tang's territory. Wang became an administrator in the Later Jin imperial government, and later was put in charge of food supplies at the transit city Heyang (河陽, in modern Luoyang, Henan). When the major general Liu Zhiyuan became in charge of the imperial guards, he became Liu's treasurer, and later followed Liu when Liu became the military governor of Hedong Circuit (河東, headquartered in modern Taiyuan, Shanxi) in 941. At Hedong, Wang became in charge of the circuit's financial and food supply matters.

== During Liu Zhiyuan's reign ==
Around the new year 947, Later Jin was destroyed by the Khitan Liao dynasty. Liu Zhiyuan, after initially hesitating, eventually decided to resist, and he declared himself emperor (of a new state later known as Later Han. He made Wang Zhang the acting director of the three financial agencies (taxation, treasury, and salt and iron monopolies). After Liu was able to capture Luoyang and Daliang later in the year (from the Liao troops which were evacuating the region), he made Wang the permanent director of those agencies. At that time, after the Central Plains had been war-ravaged, both the imperial government and the people were impoverished, and the military expenses were high as Liu was merging his Hedong army into the Later Jin imperial troops who remained in the Luoyang-Daliang region. Wang persuaded Liu to cut back on unnecessary expenditures to allow the military to be properly maintained, and was able to make sure that the treasury was not depleted.

== During Liu Chengyou's reign ==
Liu Zhiyuan died in early 948, and was succeeded by his young son Liu Chengyou. Liu Chengyou bestowed on Wang Zhang the additional titles of chancellor (同中書門下平章事, Tong Zhongshu Menxia Pingzhangshi) and acting Taiwei (太尉, one of the Three Excellencies). At that time, the Later Han imperial government was facing the threat posed by rebellions at three different circuits — Huguo (護國, headquartered in modern Yuncheng, Shanxi), Fengxiang (鳳翔, headquartered in modern Baoji, Shaanxi), and Yongxing (永興, headquartered in modern Xi'an, Shaanxi). It was said that Wang capably managed the imperial government's finances such that the military operations against the three circuits (overseen by Guo Wei) did not lack anything, and that even after the campaign, the treasury was not depleted. It was said that the imperial government was well run at that time, with Yang Bin overseeing the imperial government, Guo overseeing the military matters, Shi Hongzhao overseeing the imperial guards, and Wang overseeing the financial matters.

However, there was also a dark side to Wang's financial management style and governance. It was said that he exercised his authorities harshly and extracted much from the people, causing the people to resent the imperial government. Under prior dynasties, taxes that the people paid in grain required that the people pay 20% surcharge in addition to the assessed tax amount, known as the "bird and mouse surcharge" (i.e., to account for the amount that would be eaten by birds and mice). Wang imposed an additional 20% surcharge, known as the "agency surcharge," greatly increasing the people's tax burden. Further, previously, whatever payments that imperial treasury made were made at a discount rate, paying 80% of what the nominal amount was. Wang decreased that rate to 77%. Further, Wang carried out frequent reassessments of the field values to increase the tax assessments, such that just after a few years of Wang's administration of these matters, the people were weary from these taxes. Both Wang and Yang, with whom Wang was particularly close because they were both from Tianxiong, disliked the learned people, such that, for supplies given as civilian officials' salaries, they gave second-grade supplies that were considered not military-grade material, referring to such materials as "items of miscellany" and giving them overly high assessed values. Further, he was harsh to those who violated the law, such that people who violated the laws on state monopolies over salt and alcohol were often executed even for very minor violations. The administrators under him manipulated his harshness to be even harsher, such that the people suffered greatly.

In 950, the relationship between the leading officials was showing signs of fracture. They had discussed and resolved that, because of frequent Liao incursions and the inability for the circuits to coordinate their defenses, Guo should be sent to Yedu (鄴都, i.e., Wei Prefecture) to serve as its defender (as well as the military governor of Tianxiong) to coordinate the defense against Liao. Shi advocated that Guo be allowed to continue to retain his title as chief of staff to allow him to give orders to the military governors. The chancellor Su Fengji opposed, pointing out that there had been no precedent to allow a military governor to continue to retain chief of staff title. Eventually, Liu Chengyou approved Shi's proposal. When Shi then complained to Su about his opposition, Su responded, "Letting the central government control the outlying circuits is proper. How can it be that now you are letting an outlying circuit control the central government?"

It was at the send-off dinner for Guo the next day, at the mansion of another chancellor, Dou Zhengu, that frictions within the imperial government came to the forefront. At the feast, Shi, when toasting Guo, spoke in a harsh voice, "How could there have been opposition when we discussed this matter yesterday at the imperial gathering? Now, let us drink, younger brother [(i.e., Guo)]!" Su and Yang also raised their cups and stated, "This is an important matter for the state. Do not bear grudges!" Shi responded, again in a harsh voice, "To settle the state, it takes long spears and large swords. What use does the ink brush have? Wang responded, "Without ink brushes, where does money come from?" It was said that from this point on, there were increasing tension between generals and chancellors. Later, when Guo was about to leave the capital, he went to see Liu Chengyou and stated to him:

The Empress Dowager had long followed the deceased Emperor, and she has experienced many things. Your Imperial Majesty is your prime years. If there are important matters, it is best to ask her advice and follow it. You should be close to the faithful and honest, and be far away from the slanderous and the wicked. Be careful in examining between good and evil. Su Fengji, Yang Bin, and Shi Hongzhao are all the deceased Emperor's old subjects. They are faithful and caring for the state. May it be that Your Imperial Majesty trust them and use them, and there will be no trouble. As far as what happens on the battlefield, I, your subject, wishes to expend all of my foolish and foolhardy efforts, hopefully being worthy of your service.

Liu Chengyou showed a serious expression and thanked Guo. However, the tension between the officials continued. Not long after Guo's departure, Wang hosted a feast for the honored officials. During the feast, there was a drinking game that Shi was unfamiliar with. The director of diplomatic protocol, Yan Jinqing (閻晉卿), was seated next to Shi, and repeatedly reminded him of what the game's rules were. Su joked, "When you are seated next to someone named Yan, you need not fear being punished." However, Shi took the comment badly — as he thought that Su was satirizing his wife Lady Yan, who was once a prostitute working in a drinking hall. He cursed Su, and when Su did not respond, got up and wanted to batter Su. As a response, Su left, and he took a sword and considered chasing after Su. Yang wept and urged him to stop, stating, "Lord Su is a chancellor. If you, Lord, killed him, what kind of a place are you putting the Son of Heaven into? Please think carefully!" Shi thereafter got on a horse and left, and Yang followed him on a horse as well, not leaving him until he reached his manor. When Liu Chengyou heard of this, he sent the director of palace affairs, Wang Jun, to try to moderate, but could not repair the relationship between them. Su considered requesting an assignment as a circuit military governor, but then decided that if he left the capital, Shi could easily destroy him, and so did not. Wang Zhang, however, did request such an assignment, but Yang and Shi urged him against leaving the capital.

By winter 950, Liu Chengyou himself had tired of the control the senior officials had on his government, even though, under Yang's leadership, the imperial government was considered well-run, and Shi's overseeing of the capital made it safe for the public. Part of the friction came from how his close associates and relatives of the empress dowager were trying to gain power, but were being thwarted by Yang and Shi. At that time, Empress Dowager Li's younger brother Li Ye (李業) was serving as the director of miscellaneous affairs (武德使, Wudeshi) inside the palace, but wanted to be promoted to the higher position of director of palace affairs, a desire that Liu Chengyou and Empress Dowager Li were both in concurrence with, but Yang and Shi considered inappropriate as he lacked the seniority, so they stopped his commission. Further, Hou Kuangzan (後匡贊) the director of imperial stables, Guo Yunming (郭允明) the director of tea and wine, and Nie Wenjin (聶文進) the liaison officer at the office of the chiefs of staff, were all favored by Liu Chengyou, but had long not been promoted, causing them to be resentful. When Liu Chengyou wanted to make his favorite concubine Consort Geng empress, Yang considered it too quick after the expiration of his morning period for Liu Zhiyuan, and so opposed it. When Consort Geng died, Yang opposed Liu Chengyou's wishes to have her buried with the ceremonies due an empress. Further, there was an occasion when Yang and Shi were discussing state matters with Liu Chengyou, Liu Chengyou made the comment, "Be careful! Do not let others get a chance to criticize you!" Yang responded, "Your Imperial Majesty should just be quiet. Your subjects are still here." This led to Liu Chengyou's resentment toward them, and his close associates thereafter falsely accused Yang and the others of plotting against him. As Su resented Shi, he also incited Li Ye and the others.

Liu Chengyou, thereafter, plotted with Li Ye, Nie, Hou, and Guo Yunming to kill Yang and the others. Liu Chengyou reported his plans to Empress Dowager Li, who responded, "How can such things be easily considered! You should discuss with the chancellors further." However, Li Ye then stated, "The deceased Emperor had said before that the matters of the state should not be discussed with scholars. Their timidity will ruin you." When Empress Dowager Li tried to speak again, Liu Chengyou responded angrily, "The matters of state cannot be decided in the halls of a woman!"

On December 24, 950, as the officials were arriving at the palace for the imperial gathering, a number of soldiers appeared and killed Yang, Shi, and Wang Zhang. Subsequently, Liu Chengyou declared that they had committed treason, and stated to the chancellors and the other officials, "Yang Bin and the others viewed us as a young child. We finally now get to be your true lord. You should not worry!" He sent soldiers to arrest and kill the relatives and close associates of Yang, Shi, and Wang. Wang's wife Lady Bai had predeceased him by a few months, leaving only his daughter, who had married the official Zhang Yisu (張貽肅) and had been ill for years, but she got on her feet, aided by a cane, and walked to the execution field to be executed.

== Notes and references ==
- Old History of the Five Dynasties, vol. 107.
- New History of the Five Dynasties, vol. 30.
- Zizhi Tongjian, vols. 286, 287, 288, 289.
