= Shumishi =

Imperial Chinese official title

Shumishi (Chinese: 樞密使), or shumi, was an official title in imperial China important in the Five Dynasties and Ten Kingdoms period, the Liao dynasty, the Song dynasty and the Jin dynasty (1115–1234). Shumishi managed the Bureau of Military Affairs (Chinese: 樞密院).

Originally created in 765 in the Tang dynasty by Emperor Daizong for eunuchs to coordinate and supervise the emperor's paperwork, this post grew in importance since the 870s as eunuchs dominated the imperial Tang government and Shence army. After the Tang dynasty fell in the beginning of the 10th century, shumishi was no longer restricted to eunuchs and indeed was the title of some of highest officeholders in many Five Dynasties and Ten Kingdoms period (907–979) states. In the Song dynasty (960–1279), a shumishi was a military affairs commissioner in charge of the entire national military.
