= Wang Jun (Later Zhou chancellor) =

chancellor of Later Zhou
- Monarch: Guo Wei (Emperor Taizu)

Personal details
- Born: 902 or January 903 around modern Anyang, Henan
- Died: April or May 953 (aged 50–51) modern Shangluo, Shaanxi
- Full name: Surname: Wáng (王); Given name: Jùn (峻); Courtesy name: Xiùfēng (秀峯)
- Father: Wang Feng (王豐)

Wang Jun
- Chinese: 王峻
Transcriptions
Standard Mandarin
- Hanyu Pinyin: Wáng Jùn
- Wade–Giles: Wang^{2} Chün^{4}

Wang Jun (王峻; c. 902 – 953) was one of the first chancellors of imperial China's short-lived Later Zhou during the Five Dynasties and Ten Kingdoms period. He started his career as a singer for those in power, and rose to high prominence due to his association first with military general Liu Zhiyuan, founder of the Later Han, and later Guo Wei, who founded Later Zhou. After becoming the Later Zhou chancellor, his excessive actions gradually created a lot of distrust in Guo, culminating in his precipitous political downfall right before his death.

== Early life ==
Wang Jun was born in the last years of the Tang dynasty to Wang Feng (王豐), director of a local army band in Anyang, Xiangzhou (相州). Wang Jun's singing talents were obvious from a young age. As a preadolescent, he began serving the local Later Liang military governor Zhang Yun (張筠) as a singer. In around 915, facing an imminent attack from the Jin army, Zhang fled Xiangzhou to return to the capital Kaifeng. Thereafter, the high-ranking Later Liang minister Zhao Yan became very impressed by Wang's singing at a banquet in Zhang's house, promoting Zhang to give the boy to him.

== Career under Later Tang ==
In 923, Later Liang was extinguished by the Jin army as Later Tang was established. Zhao Yan's family were all killed, and Wang Jun drifted among the common people until he served under Zhang Yanlang, the Later Tang fiscal commissioner (三司使), who did not value him.

== Career under Later Jin ==
Zhang Yanlang was killed in 934 when Shi Jingtang's army destroyed Later Tang and established the Later Jin. Wang Jun, along with many other former Zhang Yanlang attendants, became servants for general Liu Zhiyuan, who was named Later Jin's military governor of Hezhong (河中; roughly modern Shanxi).

== Career under Later Han ==
When Liu Zhiyuan founded the Later Han in 947, Wang Jun was named commissioner of diplomatic accommodations (客省使) and accompanied general Guo Congyi (郭從義) during the latter's suppression of Zhao Siwan's (趙思綰) rebellion. Afterwards he was promoted all the way to commissioner of the northern court of palace armies (宣徽北院使) and stationed at Ye to oversee military governor Guo Wei's army.

When the Later Han emperor Liu Chengyou killed Guo Wei's entire family remaining in the capital Kaifeng, he also sent agents to assassinate both Guo and Wang Jun. When the plot failed, Guo and Wang rebelled and led the troops to attack Kaifeng. Once Liu was killed, Guo was in charge of the affairs of the state, and he asked the empress dowager to appoint Wang as the commissioner of military affairs (樞密使).

Guo had invited Liu Yun, a cousin of the late emperor, to the capital to ascend the throne, while he took his army northward to resist a Khitan-led Liao Dynasty invasion. Reaching Chanzhou (澶州), he was "forced" by his men, who wanted him to be the emperor, back to the capital. At this time Liu Yun had already reached Xuzhou, and to prevent any unforeseen circumstances, Wang Jun conspired with Wang Yin (王殷) and sent a few commanders to Xuzhou to kill Liu Yun. Liu Yun was killed, and Guo became the new emperor of the Later Zhou.

== Career under Later Zhou ==
After Guo became the emperor, Wang Jun become right associate at the Secretariat (右仆射) and deputy director of the Chancellery (門下侍郎) and a chancellor (同中書門下平章事). He also supervised work on the national history.

Wang also requested to replace fellow chancellors Li Gu and Fan Zhi with Yan Kan (顏衎) and Chen Tong (陳同), but the emperor was reluctant to do so. As his proposal was ignored, Wang became agitated and offensive in his words. It was already noon, and the emperor has had his meal; but Wang would not have him leave. Seeing Feng Dao, the emperor complained in tears that Wang's bullying has become insufferable. Afterwards, Wang was banished to military adjutant (司馬) of Shangzhou (商州; modern Shangluo, Shaanxi) and died in exile.

After Wang's banishment, Guo feared that Wang Jun might have falsified facts in his supervision of national history, so he instructed historians to read him the calendar of daily events.

== Notes and references ==
=== Sources ===
- (in Chinese) Xue Juzheng; et al., eds. (974). Wudai Shi (五代史) [History of the Five Dynasties].
- (in Chinese) Ouyang Xiu (1073). Wudai Shiji (五代史記) [Historical Records of the Five Dynasties].
- (in Chinese) Sima Guang (1086). Zizhi Tongjian (資治通鑑) [Comprehensive Mirror for Aid in Government].
