= 950s =

Decade

The 950s decade ran from January 1, 950, to December 31, 959.

== Events ==
=== 950 ===
==== By place ====
====== Byzantine Empire ======
- Arab–Byzantine War: A Hamdanid army (30,000 men) led by Sayf al-Dawla raids into Byzantine theme Anatolia. He defeats Bardas Phokas, but is then ambushed on his return and heavily defeated by Leo Phokas.

====== Europe ======
- November 22 – King Lothair II dies at Turin (possibly poisoned by Berengar of Ivrea). Berengar is crowned king of Italy and imprisons Lothair's now 19-year-old widow, Adelaide for four months at Como.
- Boleslav I, duke of Bohemia, signs a peace treaty with King Otto I of the East Frankish Kingdom. He becomes his ally, but he probably wasn't forced to resume the payment of tribute.
- Henry I, duke of Bavaria, attacks Western Hungary, taking captives and plunder. He enlarges his duchy in the wars with the Hungarians.

====== Wales ======
- King Hywel Dda ("the Good") dies after an 8-year reign in which he has established codified laws. His three sons Owain ap Hywel Dda, Rhodri ap Hywel, and Edwin ap Hywel divide Wales amongst themselves.

====== Oceania ======
- The Tu'i Tonga Empire starts to expand in the Pacific Ocean. The Tu'i Tonga kings establish the capital at Mu'a on the island of Tongatapu (approximate date).

====== North America ======
- The Mount Edziza volcanic complex in British Columbia, Canada, produces an explosive eruption that deposits the Sheep Track Member.

====== Africa ======
- City of Mogadishu is Established

==== By topic ====
====== Religion ======
- Page with Joshua Leading the Israelites, from the Joshua Roll, is made in Constantinople. It is now kept at the Biblioteca Apostolica Vaticana in Rome (approximate date).

=== 951 ===
==== By place ====
====== Europe ======
- King Berengar II of Italy seizes Liguria, with help from the feudal lord Oberto I. He reorganizes the territories south of the Po River, dividing them into three new marches (frontier districts), named after their respective margraves: the Marca Aleramica, the Marca Arduinica, and the Marca Obertenga. The last division consists of Lombardy with the cities of Genoa, Luni, Tortona, Parma, and Piacenza. Berengar forces Adelaide, the widow of Lothair II, to marry his son Adalbert. However, she fiercely refuses and Berengar has her imprisoned at Garda Castle. With the help of Count Adalbert Atto of Canossa Adelaide manages to escape.
- Fall – King Otto I crosses the Brenner Pass and takes his army into Italy. He is accompanied by his brothers, Henry I (duke of Bavaria), Bruno I, and Conrad the Red (duke of Lotharingia). Otto faces no opposition and they arrive in Pavia. Berengar II has departed the day before and entrenched himself in San Marino. Otto receives the homage of the Italian nobility, marries Adelaide, and declares himself King of the Lombards.
- Otto I dispatches an embassy to Rome to apply for an imperial coronation with Pope Agapetus II – but Prince Alberic II makes it clear that this is not possible (afraid of Otto's growing power), and opposes the request.

====== China ======
- February 9 – The Northern Han Kingdom is founded by Liu Chong (called Shizu) in modern-day Shanxi who restores the diplomatic relations with the Khitans. Northern Han becomes a protectorate of the Liao dynasty.
- February 13 – Guo Wei, a court official, leads a military coup and declares himself emperor of the new Later Zhou. The 19-year-old Emperor Liu Chengyou is killed after a 3-year reign, ending the short-lived Later Han.
- Emperor Shi Zong successfully repels a Chinese advance from the south. In October he is killed by a rebellious nephew after a three year reign. Shi Zong is succeeded by his uncle Mu Zong as ruler of the Liao dynasty.
- November 16 – Emperor Li Jing sends a Southern Tang expeditionary force (10,000 men) under Bian Hao to conquer Chu. Li Jing removes the ruling family to his own capital in Nanjing, ending the Chu Kingdom.

Africa

- Abd ar-Rahman III consolidated his grip on North Africa by occupying Tangier in 951.
- Abd ar-Rahman III signs a peace in 951 with the new king of León, Ordoño III, in order to have a free hand against the Fatimids, whose ships are harassing the caliphal fleet in the Mediterranean and had even launched an assault against Almeria. Abd ar-Rahman's force, led by prime minister Ahmad ibn Said, besieges the Fatimid port of Tunis, which purchases its safety through a huge sum.

=== 952 ===
==== By place ====
====== Europe ======
- Summer – At the Reichstag in Augsburg (assembled by King Otto I), joined by German nobles and bishops, Berengar of Ivrea pays homage. He becomes a vassal of the East Frankish Kingdom. Otto leaves a strong garrison at Pavia in the hands of his son-in-law Conrad the Red, duke of Lotharingia.

====== Scotland ======
- King Constantine II dies at the monastery of St. Andrews (where he has been retired since 943). His cousin and ruling monarch, Malcolm I, fights a battle against the Northmen or the Norse–Gaels.

====== Africa ======
- Summer – Kalbid forces under Al-Hasan ibn Ali al-Kalbi (an aristocratic member of the ruling Fatimid Caliphate) sail from Sicily and invade Byzantine Calabria. He attacks several towns, including Gerace and Cassono.

=== 953 ===
==== By place ====
====== Byzantine Empire ======
- Battle of Marash: Emir Sayf al-Dawla marches north into the Byzantine Empire and ravages the countryside of Malatya (modern Turkey). On his way back, he crosses the Euphrates and intercepts a Byzantine army led by Bardas Phokas (the Elder), near Marash. The Byzantines are defeated; Bardas himself barely escapes through the intervention of his attendants. His son Constantine Phokas, governor of Seleucia, is captured and held prisoner in Aleppo, until his death from an illness some time later.

====== Europe ======
- Summer – Liudolf, duke of Swabia, and his brother-in-law Conrad the Red rebel against King Otto I. Otto and his army fail to capture the cities of Mainz and Augsburg. He declares Liudolf and Conrad as outlaws in absentia. His brother Bruno I, archbishop of Cologne, restores royal authority in Lorraine, but some of the rebellious dukes receive support from the Hungarians. They seize the opportunity to invade Bavaria.
- The town of Póvoa de Varzim is first mentioned during the rule of Mumadona Dias, countess of Portugal, under the name Villa Euracini.

====== Africa ======
- March 19 – Caliph al-Mansur bi-Nasr Allah dies after a severe illness. He is succeeded by his 21-year-old son al-Mu'izz li-Din Allah as ruler of the Fatimid Caliphate. His authority is recognized over most of what later will be Algeria, Morocco, and Tunisia.

=== 954 ===
==== By place ====
====== Europe ======
- Spring – A Hungarian army led by Bulcsú crosses the Rhine. He camps at Worms in the capital of his ally Conrad the Red, duke of Lorraine. Bulcsú heads west, attacking the domains of King Otto I, by crossing the rivers Moselle and Maas.
- April 6–10 – The Hungarians besiege Cambrai and burn its suburbs, but they are unable to conquer the city. One of Bulcsú's relatives is killed by the defenders, who refuse to pass his body over to the Hungarians. As a revenge, they kill all their captives.
- The Hungarians plunder the regions of Hesbaye and Carbonaria (modern Belgium). They plunder and burn the monastery of Saint Lambert from Hainaut, the monastery of Moorsel, sack the cities of Gembloux and Tournai.
- Summer – The Hungarians plunder the surroundings of Laon, Reims, Chalon, Metz, and Gorze. After that, they return to Burgundy. In Provence, the Hungarians battle with the Moors from the Muslim enclave of Fraxinet.
- September 10 – King Louis IV (d'Outremer) dies after a hunting accident (near his palace in Corbeny). He is succeeded by his 13-year-old son Lothair III under the guardianship of Hugh the Great, count of Paris.
- November 12 – Lothair III is crowned by Artald, archbishop of Reims, at the Abbey of Saint-Remi as king of the West Frankish Kingdom. His mother, Queen Gerberga of Saxony, appoints Hugh the Great as regent.
- Winter – At the Reichstag in Auerstedt assembled by Otto I, his son Liudolf (duke of Swabia) and Conrad the Red submit to Otto's rule. They are stripped of their duchies, but several rebel nobles continue to resist.

====== British Isles ======
- King Eric I (Bloodaxe) is killed at Stainmore allowing King Eadred to recover York, reuniting Northumbria with that of All England. High-Reeve Osulf I of Bamburgh is appointed ealdorman ("earl") of Northumbria.
- King Malcolm I is killed in battle against the Northmen after an 11-year reign. He is succeeded by Indulf, the son of the late King Constantine II, as ruler of Alba (Scotland).

==== By topic ====
====== Religion ======
- Duke Alberic II, princeps and ruler of Rome, dies after a 22-year reign. On his deathbed he nominates his son Octavianus as his successor.
- Seborga (modern-day Liguria) comes under the jurisdiction of the Benedictine monks of Santo Onorato of Lérins.

=== 955 ===
==== By place ====
====== Europe ======
- August 10 – Battle of Lechfeld: King Otto I ("the Great") defeats the Hungarians (also known as Magyars) near Augsburg (Germany). Otto's army (7,000 men), mainly composed of heavy cavalry, overwhelms the Hungarians along the Lech River. The German losses are heavy, among them Conrad ("the Red") and many other nobles. The commanders of the Hungarian army, Bulcsú, Lehel and Súr, are captured and executed. This victory puts an end to the Hungarian campaigns into western Europe.
- October 16 – Battle on the Raxa: Otto I, allied with the Rani tribe, defeats the Obotrite federation, led by Nako and his brother Stoigniew (probably at the Recknitz or Elde rivers) near Mecklenburg. The Elbe Slavs are forced to pay tribute, and accept a peace agreement.

====== England ======
- November 23 – King Eadred (or Edred) dies childless after a 9-year reign at Frome (Somerset). He is succeeded by his 15-year-old nephew, Eadwig, as King of England.

====== Africa ======
- The Kharijite Banu Ya'la tribe revolts against the Fatimid Caliphate in Ifriqiya and destroys the city of Oran (modern Algeria). They construct a new capital, Ifgan, near Mascara.

==== By topic ====
====== Religion ======
- November 8 – Pope Agapetus II dies after a 9-year reign. He is succeeded by John XII, aged around 19 and the son of Alberic II (the late ruler of Rome), as the 130th pope of the Catholic Church.

=== 956 ===
==== By place ====
====== Byzantine Empire ======
- Summer – Emperor Constantine VII appoints Nikephoros Phokas to commander of the Byzantine field army (Domestic of the Schools) in the East. He gives him order to prepare a campaign against the Hamdanid emir Sayf al-Dawla. Constantine makes treaties with neighbouring rulers, to seek military aid.
- September - October – A Byzantine fleet under Basil Hexamilites deals a crushing defeat to the Hamdanid fleet at Tarsus in Cilicia (modern Turkey).

====== Europe ======
- Liudolf, the eldest son of King Otto I (the Great), reconciles with his father and asks again for installation as duke of Swabia. Otto refuses, but at the instigation of his uncle Bruno I (duke of Lotharingia) allows Liudolf to lead an expedition to Italy to bring the vassal Berengar of Ivrea to heel.
- Berengar of Ivrea dispatches a Lombard army under his son Adalbert II to counter Liudolf, while he guards Pavia himself. In two battles Liudolf defeats the Lombard forces and enters Pavia, there to receive the homage of the Italian nobles and clergy on behalf of Otto I.
- June 16 – Hugh the Great, count of Paris, dies at Dourdan. He is succeeded by his eldest son Hugh Capet, who is recognized as Duke of the Franks by his cousin Lothair III, king of the West Frankish Kingdom.
- King Ordoño III dies at Zamora after a 5-year reign. He is succeeded by his half-brother Sancho I as ruler of León (modern Spain).

====== Egypt ======
- An earthquake badly damages the Lighthouse of Alexandria: one of the Seven Wonders of the Ancient World.

==== By topic ====
====== Religion ======
- Dunstan, an abbot of Glastonbury Abbey, is sent into exile by King Eadwig. He takes refuge in Flanders (modern Belgium), where Count Arnulf I gives him shelter in the Abbey of Mont Blandin, near Ghent.

=== 957 ===
==== By place ====
====== Europe ======
- September 6 – Liudolf, the eldest son of King Otto I, dies of a violent fever near Pombia (it is rumored from a latent poison administered somehow by Berengar II's agents). The German armies return home, leaving Berengar of Ivrea in control of Italy. Liudolf is succeeded by his 3-year-old son Otto, who will be adopted and raised by his grandfather Otto, as the later duke of Swabia and Bavaria.
- Wilfred II, count of Besalú of the House of Barcelona, is killed by rebellious vassals. He is succeeded by his brother Sunifred II.

====== England ======
- Mercia and Northumbria rebel against King Eadwig and switch their allegiance to his brother Edgar. The English nobles (in support of the church) agree to divide the kingdom along the Thames River, with Eadwig keeping Wessex and Kent in the south and Edgar ruling in the north. Edgar's advisers recall Dunstan from Flanders (see 956).

====== Japan ======
- The Tenryaku era under the reign of Emperor Murakami ends. The Tentoku era begins (until 961).

====== Caspian Sea ======
- 957 Caspian Sea earthquake. It took place in the Caspian Sea and its vicinity. The earthquake is mentioned by several Arab and Syriac chronicle writers, who claimed that it mainly affected the region of Persian Iraq. The initial shocks lasted 40 days, but ceased for a while. The main earthquake then occurred, damaging the cities of Ray, Talikan, and Hulwan. A reported number of 150 villages were supposedly destroyed by the earthquake.

==== By topic ====
====== Religion ======
- Olga of Kiev, ruler and regent of Kievan Rus', converts to the Eastern Orthodox Church, from paganism (approximate date).
- In China the Longquan Monastery is founded during the Liao Dynasty.

=== 958 ===
==== By place ====
====== Byzantine Empire ======
- October / November – Battle of Raban: The Byzantines under John Tzimiskes defeat the Hamdanid forces in northern Syria. Emir Sayf al-Dawla is forced to retreat – many of his court companions and ghilman fall in pursuit, while over 1,700 of his Turk cavalry are captured and paraded in the streets of Constantinople.

====== Europe ======
- King Berengar II invades the March of Verona, which is under control of the dukes of Bavaria, and lay siege to Count Adalbert Atto at Canossa Castle (northern Italy). Berengar sends a Lombard expeditionary force under his son Guy of Ivrea against Theobald II, duke of Spoleto. He captures Spoleto and Camerino.

====== Africa ======
- The Fatimid general Abu al-Hasan Jawhar ibn Abd Allah takes Ifgan, the capital of the rebellious Kharijite Banu Ya'la tribe. In the following two years, Jawhar conquers most of the north of modern-day Morocco and Algeria. In particular, he conquers the cities of Tangier, Sijilmasa and Tlemcen.

====== Asia ======
- King Ksemagupta dies of a fever after a hunting party. He is succeeded by his youngest son Abhimanyu II. Queen Didda, the widow of Ksemagupta, becomes regent and the de facto ruler of Kashmir (modern India).
- Emperor Chai Rong of the Later Zhou invades the Northern Han and the Khitan Empire in the Sixteen Prefectures (northern China), but is defeated.

=== 959 ===
==== By place ====
====== Byzantine Empire ======
- April - May – The Byzantines refuse to pay the yearly tribute. A Hungarian army, led by Apor, invades Macedonia and Thrace. He plunders its territories until reaching Constantinople. On his way back, Apor is defeated during a night attack by Byzantine forces.
- November 9 – Emperor Constantine VII Porphyrogennetos ("born in the purple") dies at Constantinople after a 46-year reign. He is succeeded by his 21-year-old son Romanos II as ruler of the Byzantine Empire.
- Winter – Romanos II appoints Leo Phokas (the Younger) to be commander of the Byzantine field army (Domestic of the Schools) in the West. The Phokas clan becomes one of the leading families in Constantinople.

====== Europe ======
- Bruno I, archbishop and duke (archduke) of Lotharingia resigns. His brother, King Otto I divides the duchy in two parts – Upper Lorraine and Lower Lorraine. He appoints Frederick I and Godfrey I as margraves (vice-duke).
- Pietro III Candiano, doge of Venice, dies after a 17-year reign. He is succeeded by his son Pietro IV Candiano, who breaks off his campaign in Spoleto on behalf of King Berengar II of Italy and returns to Venice.
- Pietro IV Candiano divorces his wife Joanna for political reasons and banishes her as a nun to the monastery of San Zaccaria.

====== England ======
- October 1 – King Eadwig dies after a 4-year reign. He is succeeded by his 16-year-old brother Edgar I (the Peaceful), who effectively completes the unification of England, when Northumbria submits to his rule.

==== By topic ====
====== Religion ======
- Dunstan, bishop of Worcester and London, is appointed by Edgar I as archbishop of Canterbury and becomes his chief adviser.

== Significant people ==
- Abd al-Rahman III caliph of Córdoba
- Al-Muti caliph of Baghdad
- Al-Mu'izz li-Din Allah of Fatimid dynasty
- Pope John XII
- Pope Agapetus II

== Births ==
950

- June 12 – Reizei, Japanese emperor (d. 1011)
- Bernard I, German nobleman (approximate date)
- Dedo I, German nobleman (approximate date)
- Egbert, archbishop of Trier (approximate date)
- Emma of Blois, duchess of Aquitaine (d. 1003)
- Erik the Red, Norse Viking explorer (d. 1003)
- Guy of Anderlecht, Christian saint (d. 1012)
- Herbert III, Frankish nobleman (d. 995)
- Ibn Yunus, Fatamid astronomer (d. 1009)
- Lady Finella, Scottish noblewoman (d. 995)
- Lambert I, French nobleman (approximate date)
- Lothair Udo I, German nobleman (d. 994)
- Masako, Japanese empress consort (d. 1000)
- Moninho Viegas, French knight (d. 1022)
- Notker III, German Benedictine monk (d. 1022)
- Odo I (or Eudes), French nobleman (d. 996)
- Otto I, duke of Carinthia (approximate date)
- Reginar IV, French nobleman (approximate date)
- Sarolt, Grand Princess of Hungary (d. 1008)
- Soběslav, Bohemian nobleman (d. 1004)
- William I, French nobleman (approximate date)
- Wolbodo, bishop of Liège (approximate date)

951

- Abu Talib Yahya, Muslim imam of the Zaydiyyah sect (d. 1033)
- Gaston II Centule, viscount of Béarn (approximate date)
- Gregory of Narek, Armenian monk and theologian (d. 1003)
- Henry II (the Wrangler), duke of Bavaria (d. 995)
- Ibn al-Kattani, Moorish scholar and physician (d. 1029)
- Liu Chenggui, official of the Song dynasty (d. 1016)
- Romuald, founder of the Camaldolese order (approximate date)
- Sidi Mahrez, Muslim scholar and 'protector' (wali) (d. 1022)
- Zhao Dezhao (Yi of Yan), prince of the Song dynasty (d. 979)

952

- Adelaide of Aquitaine, French queen consort (or 945)
- Adela of Hamaland, Frankish countess and regent (d. 1021)
- Fakhr al-Dawla, emir of Gurgan and Tabaristan (d. 997)
- Sa'd al-Dawla, Hamdanid emir of Aleppo (d. 991)
- Song, Chinese empress consort (d. 995)

953

- September 14 – Guo Zongxun, Chinese emperor (d. 973)
- September 21 – Abu Ishaq Ibrahim, Buyid prince
- Charles, duke of Lower Lorraine (d. 993)
- date unknown
  - Fujiwara no Korenari, Japanese courtier (d. 989)
  - Fujiwara no Michitaka, Japanese nobleman (d. 995)
  - Herbert III, count of Vermandois (d. 1015)
  - Kisai Marvazi, Persian author and poet (d. 1002)
  - Watanabe no Tsuna, Japanese samurai (d. 1025)
  - Xiao Yanyan, Chinese Khitan empress (d. 1009)
- probable
  - Ælfheah, archbishop of Canterbury (d. 1012)
  - Al-Karaji, Persian mathematician
  - Bermudo II, king of León and Galicia

954

- Fujiwara no Yoshitaka, Japanese waka poet (d. 974)
- Malcolm II, king of Alba (Scotland) (approximate date)
- Ōnakatomi no Sukechika, Japanese waka poet (d. 1038)
- Otto I, duke of Swabia and Bavaria (d. 982)
- Wang Yucheng, Chinese official and poet (d. 1001)

955

- May 10 – Al-Aziz Billah, caliph of the Fatimid Caliphate (d. 996)
- October 22 – Qian Weijun, king of Wuyue (Ten Kingdoms) (d. 991)
- November 9 – Gyeongjong of Goryeo, ruler of Korea (d. 981)
- Aboazar Lovesendes, Portuguese nobleman (approximate date)
- Ælfric of Eynsham, English abbot and writer (approximate date)
- Arduin of Ivrea (I), Lombard margrave and king of Italy (approximate date)
- Eido I (or Ägidius), German nobleman and bishop (d. 1015)
- Ezzo (or Ehrenfried), Count Palatine of Lotharingia (Germany) (approximate date)
- Gisela of Burgundy, duchess of Bavaria (approximate date)
- Gunther of Bohemia, German hermit and saint (d. 1045)
- Lutgardis of Luxemburg, countess of Holland (Netherlands)
- Matilda, Abbess of Quedlinburg, German princess-abbess and daughter of Otto I (d. 999)
- Otto II, Holy Roman Emperor ("the Red") (d. 983)
- Theophanu, empress consort of the Holy Roman Empire (d. 991)
- Kunhsaw Kyaunghpyu, king of the Pagan dynasty (d. 1048)

956

- Siegfried II, count of Stade (d. 1037)
- probable
  - Adalbert of Prague, Bohemian bishop (approximate date)
  - Sampiro, Spanish bishop (approximate date)

957

- Fujiwara no Junshi, Japanese empress consort (d. 1017)
- Fujiwara no Kinsue, Japanese statesman (d. 1029)
- Fujiwara no Sanesuke, Japanese nobleman (d. 1046)
- Fujiwara no Yoshikane, Japanese nobleman (d. 1021)
- Lu Zhen, Chinese scholar-official (approximate date)
- Wang Dan, Chinese politician and Grand Chancellor (d. 1017)

958

- Basil II (Bulgar Slayer), Byzantine emperor (d. 1025)
- Otto-William, count of Burgundy (approximate date)
- Rinchen Zangpo, Tibetan Buddhist monk (d. 1055)
- Samuel, tsar of the Bulgarian Empire (approximate date)
- Vladimir I (the Great), Grand Prince of Kiev (d. 1015)
- Yang Yanzhao, general of the Song dynasty (d. 1014)
- Yaropolk I, Grand Prince of Kiev (approximate date)

959

- April 12 – En'yū, emperor of Japan (d. 991)
- Yeshe-Ö, Tibetan lama-king (approximate date)
- Zhao Defang, prince of the Song Dynasty (d. 981)

== Deaths ==
950

- January 15 – Wang Jingchong, Chinese general
- October 7 – Li, Chinese empress consort
- October – Al-Qahir, Abbasid caliph (b. 899)
- November 22 – Lothair II, king of Italy
- December 24
  - Shi Hongzhao, Chinese general
  - Wang Zhang, Chinese official
  - Yang Bin, Chinese chancellor
- Ælfric, bishop of Ramsbury (approximate date)
- Al-Farabi, Muslim philosopher (or 951)
- Hywel Dda ("the Good"), king of Wales
- Li Jinquan, Chinese general (approximate date)
- Ricfried, Frankish nobleman (b. 845)
- Sunyer, count of Barcelona, Girona and Ausona
- Zoltán, Grand Prince of Hungary (approximate date)
- Dharma Mahadevi, Indian Queen Regnant

951

- January 1 – Ramiro II, king of León and Galicia
- January 2
  - Liu Chengyou, emperor of Later Han (b. 931)
  - Su Fengji, Chinese official and chancellor
- January 25 – Ma Xiguang, ruler of Chu (Ten Kingdoms)
- February 24 – Liu Yun, Chinese governor (jiedushi)
- March 12 – Ælfheah the Bald, bishop of Winchester
- June 7 – Lu Wenji, Chinese chancellor (b. 876)
- June 8 – Zhao Ying, Chinese chancellor (b. 885)
- October 7
  - Shi Zong, emperor of the Liao dynasty (b. 919)
  - Xiao, Chinese Khitan empress dowager
  - Zhen, Chinese Khitan empress consort
- October 8 – Xiao Sagezhi, Chinese Khitan empress
- Cadwgan ab Owain, king of Glywysing (Wales)
- Cennétig mac Lorcáin, king of Tuadmumu (Ireland)
- Gofraid mac Sitriuc, Viking king of Dublin (Ireland)
- Wang Chuhui, Chinese chief of staff (shumishi)
- Wang Yanzheng, emperor of Min (approximate date)

952

- June 15 – Murong Yanchao, Chinese general
- July 17 – Wu Hanyue, Chinese noblewoman (b. 913)
- September 6 – Suzaku, emperor of Japan (b. 923)
- September 10 – Gao Xingzhou, Chinese general (b. 885)
- December 17 – Hugh the Black, duke of Burgundy
- date unknown
  - Alan II (Wrybeard), duke of Brittany
  - Constantine II, king of Alba (Scotland)
  - Li Jianxun, Chinese official and chancellor
  - Mansur ibn Qara-Tegin, Samanid governor

953

- March 19 – al-Mansur bi-Nasr Allah, Fatimid caliph (b. 913)
- August 1 – Yingtian, Chinese Khitan empress (b. 879)
- November 18 – Liutgard, duchess of Lorraine (b. 931)

date unknown

  - Abas I, king of the Bagratuni dynasty (Armenia)
  - Mastalus I, penultimate patricius of Amalfi (Italy)
  - Ma Yinsun, Chinese official and chancellor
  - Muhammad bin Musafir, Sallarid ruler (approximate date)
  - Rasso, Frankish military leader, pilgrim and saint
  - Wang Jun, Chinese singer and chancellor
- probable
  - Æthelgar, bishop of Crediton
  - Rhodri ap Hywel, king of Deheubarth (Wales)

954

- January 25 – Ashot II, prince of Tao-Klarjeti (Georgia)
- February 22 – Guo Wei, emperor of the Later Zhou (b. 904)
- May 21 – Feng Dao, Chinese prince and chancellor (b. 882)
- September 10 – Louis IV, king of the West Frankish Kingdom
- Abul-Aish Ahmad, Idrisid ruler and sultan (Morocco)
- Alberic II, princeps and duke of Spoleto (b. 912)
- Cellachán Caisil, king of Munster (Ireland)
- Eric I (Bloodaxe), Norwegian Viking king
- Frederick, archbishop (elector) of Mainz
- Fujiwara no Onshi, empress of Japan (b. 885)
- Li, Chinese empress dowager of the Later Han
- Liu Chong, founder of the Northern Han
- Malcolm I, king of Alba (Scotland)
- Nuh ibn Nasr, Samanid emir

955

- July 23 – He Ning, Chinese official and chancellor (b. 898)
- August 10 – Conrad ("the Red"), duke of Lorraine
- August 15
  - Bulcsú, Hungarian tribal chieftain (harka)
  - Lehel, Hungarian tribal chieftain
  - Súr, Hungarian tribal chieftain
- October 16 – Stoigniew, Obotrite prince and co-ruler
- November 1 – Henry I, Duke of Bavaria
- November 8 – Pope Agapetus II, Catholic Church pontiff (b. 905)
- November 23 – Eadred (or Edred), king of England (b. 923)
- Abu 'Ali Chaghani, ruler of Chaghaniyan (Turkmenistan)
- Bermudo Núñez, count of Cea (Spain) (approximate date)
- Gamle Eirikssen, Norwegian Viking ruler (b. 910)
- Hervé I, count of Mortagne and Perche
- Muhammad ibn Shaddad, Shaddadid ruler
- Parantaka I, ruler of Chola Kingdom (India)
- Sultan Satuq Bughra Khan, Kara-Khanid ruler

956

- February 15 – Su Yugui, Chinese chancellor (b. 895)
- February 27 – Theophylact, Byzantine patriarch (b. 917)
- April 8 – Gilbert, duke of Burgundy
- April 15 – Lin Yanyu, Chinese court official and eunuch
- May 19 – Robert, archbishop of Trier
- June 4 – Muhammad II of Shirvan, Muslim ruler
- June 16 – Hugh the Great, Frankish nobleman (b. 898)
- July/August – Fulbert of Cambrai, bishop
- August – Ordoño III, king of León
- August 29 – Fu (the Elder), Chinese empress consort
- September/October – Al-Masudi, Muslim historian and geographer
- December 21 – Sun Sheng, Chinese chancellor
- December 26 – Wulfstan, archbishop of York
- date unknown
  - Ahmad al-Muhajir, Muslim scholar and imam (b. 873)
  - Congalach Cnogba, High King of Ireland
  - Gandaraditya, ruler of Chola Kingdom
  - Zhao Hongyin, Chinese general

957

- January 16 – Abu Bakr Muhammad ibn Ali al-Madhara'i, Tulunid vizier (b. 871)
- June 14 – Guadamir, bishop of Vic (Spain)
- September 6 – Liudolf, duke of Swabia
- date unknown
  - Arinjaya, king of the Chola Kingdom (India)
  - Istakhri, Persian traveler and geographer
  - Marzuban ibn Muhammad, Sallarid ruler
  - Ruzbahan, Buyid tax collector and general
  - Wilfred II, count of Besalú (Spain)

958

- May – Ibn Durustawayh, Persian grammarian, lexicographer and student of the Quran and hadith (b. 872)
- June 2 – Oda (the Good), archbishop of Canterbury
- September 17 – Li Jingsui, Chinese prince (b. 920)
- September 18 – Liu Sheng, Chinese emperor (b. 920)
- October 15 – Toda, queen of Pamplona (b. 876)
- date unknown
  - Ammar ibn Ali al-Kalbi, Fatimid military commander
  - Faifne an Filí, Irish poet and ollamh ("professor")
  - Finshneachta Ua Cuill, Irish poet
  - Fujiwara no Kiyotada, Japanese poet
  - Lashkarwarz, Daylamite military commander
  - Mastalus II, duke and patrician of Amalfi (Italy)
  - Ōnakatomi no Yorimoto, Japanese waka poet
  - Qingliang Wenyi, Chinese Buddhist monk
  - Sumbat I, king of Iberia (Georgia)
- probable
  - Drogo, duke of Brittany
  - Gorm the Old, king of Denmark. He was born before 900 and may have died as late as 964.

959

- July 27 – Chai Rong, emperor of Later Zhou (b. 921)
- October 1 – Eadwig (the All Fair), king of England
- October 3 – Gérard of Brogne, Frankish abbot
- November 9 – Constantine VII, Byzantine emperor (b. 905)
- Ælfsige (or Aelfsige), archbishop of Canterbury
- Chen Jue, Chinese official and chief of staff
- Donnchadh mac Urchadh, king of Maigh Seóla (Ireland)
- Han Yanhui, Chinese Khitan chancellor (b. 882)
- Pietro III Candiano, doge of Venice
- Song Qiqiu, Chinese chief strategist (b. 887)
