= 957 =

Calendar year

957 in various calendars
Gregorian calendar	957; CMLVII
Ab urbe condita	1710
Armenian calendar	406; ԹՎ ՆԶ
Assyrian calendar	5707
Balinese saka calendar	878–879
Bengali calendar	363–364
Berber calendar	1907
Buddhist calendar	1501
Burmese calendar	319
Byzantine calendar	6465–6466
Chinese calendar	丙辰年 (Fire Dragon); 3654 or 3447 — to — 丁巳年 (Fire Snake); 3655 or 3448
Coptic calendar	673–674
Discordian calendar	2123
Ethiopian calendar	949–950
Hebrew calendar	4717–4718
- Hindu calendars
Vikram Samvat	1013–1014
Shaka Samvat	878–879
Kali Yuga	4057–4058
Holocene calendar	10957
Iranian calendar	335–336
Islamic calendar	345–346
Japanese calendar	Tenryaku 11 / Tentoku 1 (天徳元年)
Javanese calendar	857–858
Julian calendar	957; CMLVII
Korean calendar	3290
Minguo calendar	955 before ROC 民前955年
Nanakshahi calendar	−511
Seleucid era	1268/1269 AG
Thai solar calendar	1499–1500
Tibetan calendar	མེ་ཕོ་འབྲུག་ལོ་ (male Fire-Dragon); 1083 or 702 or −70 — to — མེ་མོ་སྦྲུལ་ལོ་ (female Fire-Snake); 1084 or 703 or −69

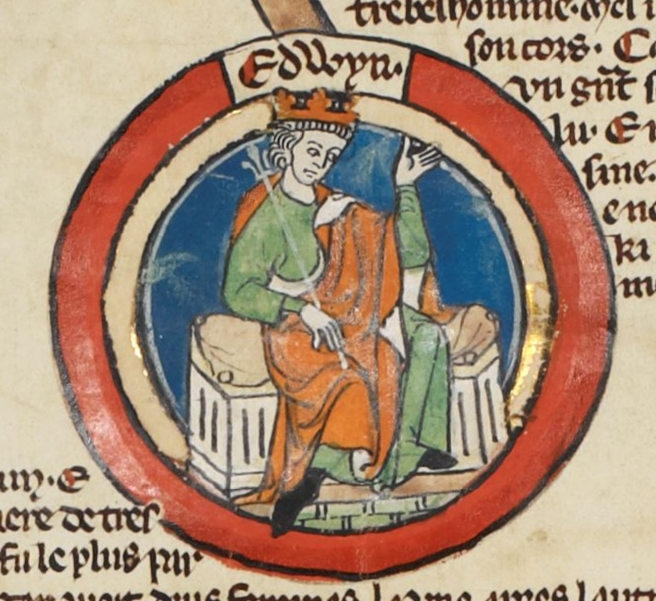
Eadwig, king of England (r. 955–959)

Year 957 (CMLVII) was a common year starting on Thursday of the Julian calendar.

== Events ==
=== By place ===
==== Europe ====
- September 6 – Liudolf, the eldest son of King Otto I, dies of a violent fever near Pombia (it is rumored from a latent poison administered somehow by Berengar II's agents). The German armies return home, leaving Berengar of Ivrea in control of Italy. Liudolf is succeeded by his 3-year-old son Otto, who will be adopted and raised by his grandfather Otto, as the later duke of Swabia and Bavaria.
- Wilfred II, count of Besalú of the House of Barcelona, is killed by rebellious vassals. He is succeeded by his brother Sunifred II.

==== England ====
- Mercia and Northumbria rebel against King Eadwig and switch their allegiance to his brother Edgar. The English nobles (in support of the church) agree to divide the kingdom along the Thames River, with Eadwig keeping Wessex and Kent in the south and Edgar ruling in the north. Edgar's advisers recall Dunstan from Flanders (see 956).

==== Japan ====
- The Tenryaku era under the reign of Emperor Murakami ends. The Tentoku era begins (until 961).

==== Caspian Sea ====
- 957 Caspian Sea earthquake. It took place in the Caspian Sea and its vicinity. The earthquake is mentioned by several Arab and Syriac chronicle writers, who claimed that it mainly affected the region of Persian Iraq. The initial shocks lasted 40 days, but ceased for a while. The main earthquake then occurred, damaging the cities of Ray, Talikan, and Hulwan. A reported number of 150 villages were supposedly destroyed by the earthquake.

=== By topic ===
==== Religion ====
- Olga of Kiev, ruler and regent of Kievan Rus', converts to the Eastern Orthodox Church, from paganism (approximate date).
- In China the Longquan Monastery is founded during the Liao Dynasty.

== Births ==
- Fujiwara no Junshi, Japanese empress consort (d. 1017)
- Fujiwara no Kinsue, Japanese statesman (d. 1029)
- Fujiwara no Sanesuke, Japanese nobleman (d. 1046)
- Fujiwara no Yoshikane, Japanese nobleman (d. 1021)
- Lu Zhen, Chinese scholar-official (approximate date)
- Wang Dan, Chinese politician and Grand Chancellor (d. 1017)

== Deaths ==
- January 16 – Abu Bakr Muhammad ibn Ali al-Madhara'i, Tulunid vizier (b. 871)
- June 14 – Guadamir, bishop of Vic (Spain)
- September 6 – Liudolf, duke of Swabia
- date unknown
  - Arinjaya, king of the Chola Kingdom (India)
  - Istakhri, Persian traveler and geographer
  - Marzuban ibn Muhammad, Sallarid ruler
  - Ruzbahan, Buyid tax collector and general
  - Wilfred II, count of Besalú (Spain)

== Sources ==
- Antonopoulos, J. (1980), Data from investigation of seismic Sea waves events in the Eastern Mediterranean from 500 to 1000 A.D., Annals of Geophysics
