= 953 =

Calendar year

953 in various calendars
Gregorian calendar	953; CMLIII
Ab urbe condita	1706
Armenian calendar	402; ԹՎ ՆԲ
Assyrian calendar	5703
Balinese saka calendar	874–875
Bengali calendar	359–360
Berber calendar	1903
Buddhist calendar	1497
Burmese calendar	315
Byzantine calendar	6461–6462
Chinese calendar	壬子年 (Water Rat); 3650 or 3443 — to — 癸丑年 (Water Ox); 3651 or 3444
Coptic calendar	669–670
Discordian calendar	2119
Ethiopian calendar	945–946
Hebrew calendar	4713–4714
- Hindu calendars
Vikram Samvat	1009–1010
Shaka Samvat	874–875
Kali Yuga	4053–4054
Holocene calendar	10953
Iranian calendar	331–332
Islamic calendar	341–342
Japanese calendar	Tenryaku 7 (天暦７年)
Javanese calendar	853–854
Julian calendar	953; CMLIII
Korean calendar	3286
Minguo calendar	959 before ROC 民前959年
Nanakshahi calendar	−515
Seleucid era	1264/1265 AG
Thai solar calendar	1495–1496
Tibetan calendar	ཆུ་ཕོ་བྱི་བ་ལོ་ (male Water-Rat); 1079 or 698 or −74 — to — ཆུ་མོ་གླང་ལོ་ (female Water-Ox); 1080 or 699 or −73

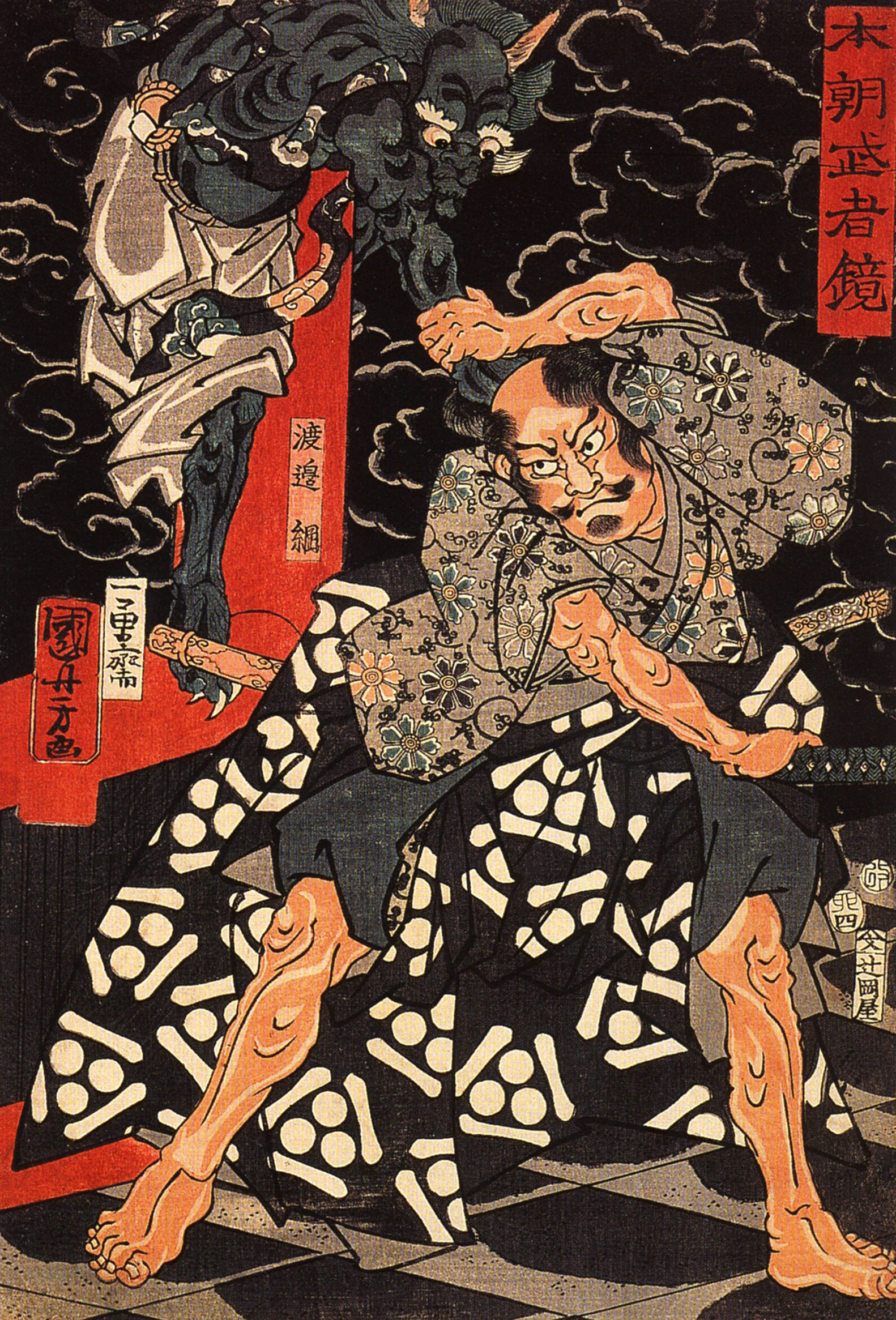
Watanabe no Tsuna (953–1025)

Year 953 (CMLIII) was a common year starting on Saturday of the Julian calendar.

== Events ==
=== By place ===
==== Byzantine Empire ====
- Battle of Marash: Emir Sayf al-Dawla marches north into the Byzantine Empire and ravages the countryside of Malatya (modern Turkey). On his way back, he crosses the Euphrates and intercepts a Byzantine army led by Bardas Phokas (the Elder), near Marash. The Byzantines are defeated; Bardas himself barely escapes through the intervention of his attendants. His son Constantine Phokas, governor of Seleucia, is captured and held prisoner in Aleppo, until his death from an illness some time later.

==== Europe ====
- Summer – Liudolf, duke of Swabia, and his brother-in-law Conrad the Red rebel against King Otto I. Otto and his army fail to capture the cities of Mainz and Augsburg. He declares Liudolf and Conrad as outlaws in absentia. His brother Bruno I, archbishop of Cologne, restores royal authority in Lorraine, but some of the rebellious dukes receive support from the Hungarians. They seize the opportunity to invade Bavaria.
- The town of Póvoa de Varzim is first mentioned during the rule of Mumadona Dias, countess of Portugal, under the name Villa Euracini.

==== Africa ====
- March 19 – Caliph al-Mansur bi-Nasr Allah dies after a severe illness. He is succeeded by his 21-year-old son al-Mu'izz li-Din Allah as ruler of the Fatimid Caliphate. His authority is recognized over most of what later will be Algeria, Morocco, and Tunisia.

== Births ==
- September 14 – Guo Zongxun, Chinese emperor (d. 973)
- September 21 – Abu Ishaq Ibrahim, Buyid prince
- Charles, duke of Lower Lorraine (d. 993)
- date unknown
  - Fujiwara no Korenari, Japanese courtier (d. 989)
  - Fujiwara no Michitaka, Japanese nobleman (d. 995)
  - Herbert III, count of Vermandois (d. 1015)
  - Kisai Marvazi, Persian author and poet (d. 1002)
  - Watanabe no Tsuna, Japanese samurai (d. 1025)
  - Xiao Yanyan, Chinese Khitan empress (d. 1009)
- probable
  - Ælfheah, archbishop of Canterbury (d. 1012)
  - Al-Karaji, Persian mathematician
  - Bermudo II, king of León and Galicia

== Deaths ==
- March 19 – al-Mansur bi-Nasr Allah, Fatimid caliph (b. 913)
- August 1 – Yingtian, Chinese Khitan empress (b. 879)
- November 18 – Liutgard, duchess of Lorraine (b. 931)

date unknown

  - Abas I, king of the Bagratuni dynasty (Armenia)
  - Mastalus I, penultimate patricius of Amalfi (Italy)
  - Ma Yinsun, Chinese official and chancellor
  - Muhammad bin Musafir, Sallarid ruler (approximate date)
  - Rasso, Frankish military leader, pilgrim and saint
  - Wang Jun, Chinese singer and chancellor
- probable
  - Æthelgar, bishop of Crediton
  - Rhodri ap Hywel, king of Deheubarth (Wales)
