= 958 =

Calendar year

958 in various calendars
- Gregorian calendar: 958; CMLVIII
- Ab urbe condita: 1711
- Armenian calendar: 407; ԹՎ ՆԷ
- Assyrian calendar: 5708
- Balinese saka calendar: 879–880
- Bengali calendar: 364–365
- Berber calendar: 1908
- Buddhist calendar: 1502
- Burmese calendar: 320
- Byzantine calendar: 6466–6467
- Chinese calendar: 丁巳年 (Fire Snake); 3655 or 3448 — to — 戊午年 (Earth Horse); 3656 or 3449
- Coptic calendar: 674–675
- Discordian calendar: 2124
- Ethiopian calendar: 950–951
- Hebrew calendar: 4718–4719
- Hindu calendars
- Vikram Samvat: 1014–1015
- Shaka Samvat: 879–880
- Kali Yuga: 4058–4059
- Holocene calendar: 10958
- Iranian calendar: 336–337
- Islamic calendar: 346–347
- Japanese calendar: Tentoku 2 (天徳２年)
- Javanese calendar: 858–859
- Julian calendar: 958; CMLVIII
- Korean calendar: 3291
- Minguo calendar: 954 before ROC 民前954年
- Nanakshahi calendar: −510
- Seleucid era: 1269/1270 AG
- Thai solar calendar: 1500–1501
- Tibetan calendar: མེ་མོ་སྦྲུལ་ལོ་ (female Fire-Snake); 1084 or 703 or −69 — to — ས་ཕོ་རྟ་ལོ་ (male Earth-Horse); 1085 or 704 or −68

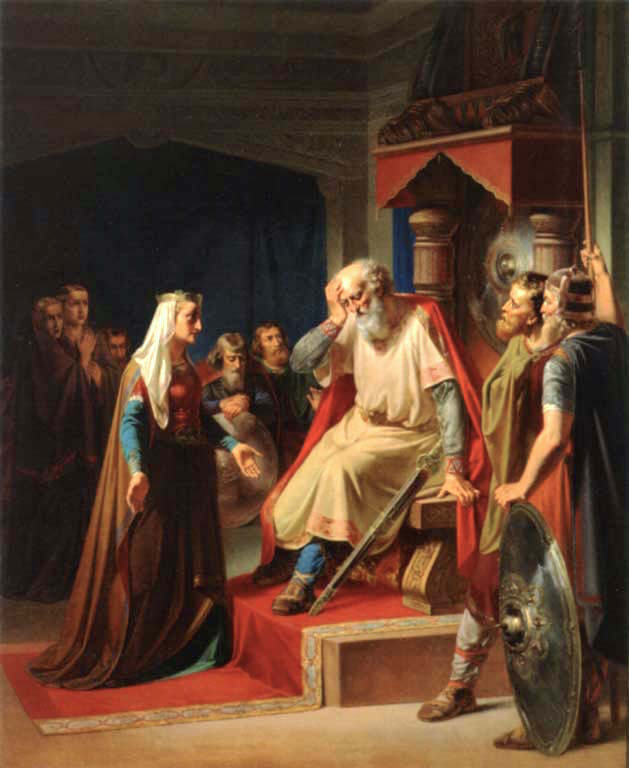
King Gorm the Old (c. 936 – c. 958)

Year 958 (CMLVIII) was a common year starting on Friday of the Julian calendar.

== Events ==
=== By place ===
==== Byzantine Empire ====
- October / November – Battle of Raban: The Byzantines under John Tzimiskes defeat the Hamdanid forces in northern Syria. Emir Sayf al-Dawla is forced to retreat – many of his court companions and ghilman fall in pursuit, while over 1,700 of his Turk cavalry are captured and paraded in the streets of Constantinople.

==== Europe ====
- King Berengar II invades the March of Verona, which is under control of the dukes of Bavaria, and lay siege to Count Adalbert Atto at Canossa Castle (northern Italy). Berengar sends a Lombard expeditionary force under his son Guy of Ivrea against Theobald II, duke of Spoleto. He captures Spoleto and Camerino.

==== Africa ====
- The Fatimid general Abu al-Hasan Jawhar ibn Abd Allah takes Ifgan, the capital of the rebellious Kharijite Banu Ya'la tribe. In the following two years, Jawhar conquers most of the north of modern-day Morocco and Algeria. In particular, he conquers the cities of Tangier, Sijilmasa and Tlemcen.

==== Asia ====
- King Ksemagupta dies of a fever after a hunting party. He is succeeded by his youngest son Abhimanyu II. Queen Didda, the widow of Ksemagupta, becomes regent and the de facto ruler of Kashmir (modern India).
- Emperor Chai Rong of the Later Zhou invades the Northern Han and the Khitan Empire in the Sixteen Prefectures (northern China), but is defeated.

== Births ==
- Basil II (Bulgar Slayer), Byzantine emperor (d. 1025)
- Otto-William, count of Burgundy (approximate date)
- Rinchen Zangpo, Tibetan Buddhist monk (d. 1055)
- Samuel, tsar of the Bulgarian Empire (approximate date)
- Vladimir I (the Great), Grand Prince of Kiev (d. 1015)
- Yang Yanzhao, general of the Song dynasty (d. 1014)
- Yaropolk I, Grand Prince of Kiev (approximate date)

== Deaths ==
- May – Ibn Durustawayh, Persian grammarian, lexicographer and student of the Quran and hadith (b. 872)
- June 2 – Oda (the Good), archbishop of Canterbury
- September 17 – Li Jingsui, Chinese prince (b. 920)
- September 18 – Liu Sheng, Chinese emperor (b. 920)
- October 15 – Toda, queen of Pamplona (b. 876)
- date unknown
  - Ammar ibn Ali al-Kalbi, Fatimid military commander
  - Faifne an Filí, Irish poet and ollamh ("professor")
  - Finshneachta Ua Cuill, Irish poet
  - Fujiwara no Kiyotada, Japanese poet
  - Lashkarwarz, Daylamite military commander
  - Mastalus II, duke and patrician of Amalfi (Italy)
  - Ōnakatomi no Yorimoto, Japanese waka poet
  - Qingliang Wenyi, Chinese Buddhist monk
  - Sumbat I, king of Iberia (Georgia)
- probable
  - Drogo, duke of Brittany
  - Gorm the Old, king of Denmark. He was born before 900 and may have died as late as 964.
