= Aedh Ua Raithnen =

Irish poet

Aedh Ua Raithnen, Irish poet, fl. c. 954.

Aedh was a poet, whose few known surviving verses concern the life and death of King Congalach Cnogba of Brega.

== Example ==
A verse of Aedh's is inserted in the Annals of the Four Masters, sub anno 954:

- After despoiling of pleasant Ath-cliath/Which sent the foreigners out of Ireland/Was two years over ten/Of the reign of fair Conghalach.
- Four, fifty, in truth/And nine hundred,—no slight fact/From the birth of Christ at fair/ Bethil Till the death of the noble son of Maelmithigh.

== See also ==
- Óengus mac Óengusa, chief poet of Ireland, died 930.
- Bard Boinne chief poet of Ireland, died 931.
- Finshneachta Ua Cuill, died 958.
