= Swimming at the 2002 Commonwealth Games – Women's 50 metre butterfly =

Women's 50 metres butterfly at the 2002 Commonwealth Games
- Venue: Manchester Aquatics Centre
- Dates: 30–31 July 2002
- Competitors: 28 from 21 nations
- Winning time: 26.66

Medalists
gold medal	Petria Thomas	Australia
silver medal	Nicole Irving	Australia
bronze medal	Alison Sheppard	Scotland

The women's 50 metre butterfly event at the 2002 Commonwealth Games was held on 30 to 31 July at the Manchester Aquatics Centre.

== Results ==
=== Preliminaries ===
Rank	Heat	Lane	Name	Nationality	Time	Notes
1	4	4	Petria Thomas	Australia	27.09	Q
2	2	4	Nicole Irving	Australia	27.22	Q
3	3	5	Alison Sheppard	Scotland	27.39	Q
4	2	5	Mandy Loots	South Africa	27.60	Q
5	3	4	Rosalind Brett	England	27.80	Q
6	4	5	Joscelin Yeo	Singapore	27.87	Q
7	4	3	Kerry Martin	Scotland	27.88	Q
8	3	2	Georgie Lee	England	28.02	Q
9	3	3	Nadine Rolland	Canada	28.14	Q
10	4	7	Audrey Lacroix	Canada	28.17	Q
11	4	2	Leah Martindale	Barbados	28.18	Q
12	2	3	Sarah Ryan	Australia	28.23	Q
12	4	1	Maria Papadopoulou	Cyprus	28.23	Q
14	2	6	Hannah McLean	New Zealand	28.41	Q
15	3	6	Julie Douglas	Northern Ireland	28.43	Q
15	4	7	Karla Hancocks	Wales	28.43	Q
17	3	7	Mandy Leach	Zimbabwe	28.68	
18	2	7	Jennifer Fratesi	Canada	28.82	
19	2	1	Emma Hirst	Jersey	29.09	
20	3	1	Caroline Pickering	Fiji	29.11	
21	3	8	Sharntelle McLean	Trinidad and Tobago	29.23	
22	2	2	Tamara Swaby	Jamaica	29.28	
23	1	4	Emily Crookall-Nixon	Isle of Man	29.76	
24	2	8	Angela Galea	Malta	29.94	
25	1	5	Elaine Reyes	Gibraltar	31.79	
26	1	3	Sana Abdul Wahid	Pakistan	33.53	
27	1	6	Keren Lee Visser	Zambia	34.18	
—	4	8	Natalia Roumbina	Cyprus	DQ	

=== Semifinals ===
Rank	Heat	Lane	Name	Nationality	Time	Notes
1	2	4	Petria Thomas	Australia	27.09	Q
2	1	4	Nicole Irving	Australia	27.19	Q
3	2	5	Alison Sheppard	Scotland	27.30	Q
4	1	5	Mandy Loots	South Africa	27.48	Q
5	2	3	Rosalind Brett	England	27.57	Q
6	2	6	Kerry Martin	Scotland	27.74	Q
7	1	3	Joscelin Yeo	Singapore	27.83	Q
8	2	8	Karla Hancocks	Wales	27.89	Q
9	1	6	Georgie Lee	England	27.97	
9	2	2	Nadine Rolland	Canada	27.97	
11	1	8	Julie Douglas	Northern Ireland	28.07	
12	1	2	Audrey Lacroix	Canada	28.15	
13	2	1	Maria Papadopoulou	Cyprus	28.19	
14	1	1	Hannah McLean	New Zealand	28.21	
14	2	7	Leah Martindale	Barbados	28.21	
16	1	7	Sarah Ryan	Australia	28.33	

=== Final ===
Rank	Lane	Name	Nationality	Time	Notes
1st place, gold medalist(s)	4	Petria Thomas	Australia	26.66	GR
2nd place, silver medalist(s)	5	Nicole Irving	Australia	27.13	
3rd place, bronze medalist(s)	3	Alison Sheppard	Scotland	27.30	
4	2	Rosalind Brett	England	27.41	
5	6	Mandy Loots	South Africa	27.55	
6	1	Joscelin Yeo	Singapore	27.88	
7	7	Kerry Martin	Scotland	27.94	
8	8	Karla Hancocks	Wales	28.22	
