= Baltic Freedom Day =

Anniversary of the start of Soviet deportations from Baltic states

- Date: June 14
- Next time: June 14, 2025
- Frequency: annual

Baltic Freedom Day – 14 June, a name given to the day when Soviet deportations from the Baltic states started. The term Baltic Freedom Day for the first time was mentioned in Ronald Reagan's proclamation number 4948 on June 14, 1982.

Baltic Freedom Day references the Soviet-Nazi Molotov–Ribbentrop Pact which led to the mass deportations of peoples from Estonia, Latvia, and Lithuania.
