= 1021 =

Calendar year

1021 in various calendars
- Gregorian calendar: 1021; MXXI
- Ab urbe condita: 1774
- Armenian calendar: 470; ԹՎ ՆՀ
- Assyrian calendar: 5771
- Balinese saka calendar: 942–943
- Bengali calendar: 427–428
- Berber calendar: 1971
- English Regnal year: N/A
- Buddhist calendar: 1565
- Burmese calendar: 383
- Byzantine calendar: 6529–6530
- Chinese calendar: 庚申年 (Metal Monkey); 3718 or 3511 — to — 辛酉年 (Metal Rooster); 3719 or 3512
- Coptic calendar: 737–738
- Discordian calendar: 2187
- Ethiopian calendar: 1013–1014
- Hebrew calendar: 4781–4782
- Hindu calendars
- Vikram Samvat: 1077–1078
- Shaka Samvat: 942–943
- Kali Yuga: 4121–4122
- Holocene calendar: 11021
- Igbo calendar: 21–22
- Iranian calendar: 399–400
- Islamic calendar: 411–412
- Japanese calendar: Kannin 5 / Jian 1 (治安元年)
- Javanese calendar: 923–924
- Julian calendar: 1021; MXXI
- Korean calendar: 3354
- Minguo calendar: 891 before ROC 民前891年
- Nanakshahi calendar: −447
- Seleucid era: 1332/1333 AG
- Thai solar calendar: 1563–1564
- Tibetan calendar: ལྕགས་ཕོ་སྤྲེ་ལོ་ (male Iron-Monkey); 1147 or 766 or −6 — to — ལྕགས་མོ་བྱ་ལོ་ (female Iron-Bird); 1148 or 767 or −5

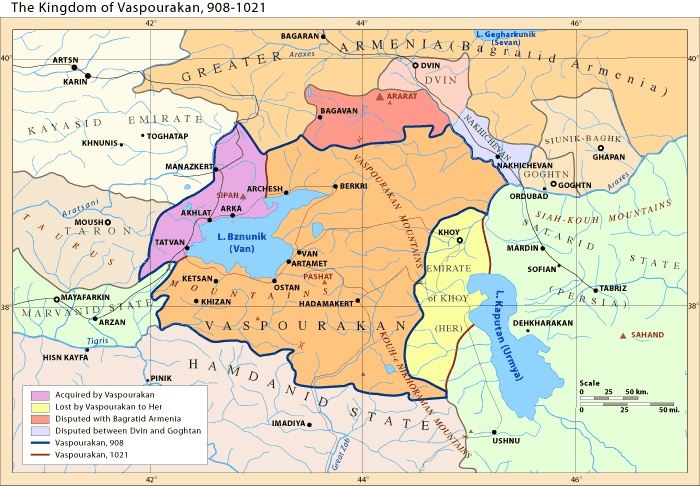
The Kingdom of Vaspurakan (908–1021)

Year 1021 (MXXI) was a common year starting on Sunday of the Julian calendar.

== Events ==
=== By place ===
==== Europe ====
- November – Emperor Henry II conducts his fourth Italian military campaign. He crosses the Brenner Pass with a 60,000-strong army, and reaches Verona, where he receives Lombard levies. Henry proceeds to Mantua and then into Ravenna, to spend Christmas there.
- Abd al-Aziz al-Mansur, a grandson of the prominent Andalusian figure Almanzor begins his rule in Taifa of Valencia, a Moorish kingdom in Al-Andalus (modern Spain), ushering in a period of relative stability and prosperity that will last until 1061. Taifa of Valencia gained its independence from the Caliphate of Córdoba in 1010.

==== Africa ====
- February 13 – On one of his habitual night rides in the outskirts of Cairo, the Fatimid caliph al-Hakim bi-Amr Allah disappears, most likely assassinated by disaffected palace factions, apparently involving his sister, Sitt al-Mulk.
- March 26 – On the feast of Eid al-Adha, the death of al-Hakim, kept secret for six weeks, is announced, along with the succession of his son, al-Zahir li-i'zaz Din Allah. On the same day, al-Hakim's designated heir, Abd al-Rahim ibn Ilyas, is arrested in Damascus and brought to Egypt.
- The last evidence of indigenous Christian and non-Arabophone culture in Tripolitania (modern Libya) is seen.

==== Asia ====
- Senekerim-Hovhannes Artsruni, Armenian king of Vaspurakan, surrenders his kingdom to the Byzantine Empire. In return, he receives Sebasteia and becomes governor of Cappadocia.
- Battle of Shirimni, the Byzantine Empire under Basil II defeats the Kingdom of Georgia under Giorgi I at Shirimni, at the Lake Palakazio, modern Lake Çıldır, Turkey
- Hovhannes-Smbat III, King of the Armenian kingdom of Ani, is attacked by his younger brother Ashot IV, and loses much power to him, becoming concurrent king of outlying territories.
- Emperor Rajendra Chola I extends his influence of the Chola Empire to the banks of the Ganges River (North India) and invades Bengal.
- Sultan Mahmud of Ghazni appoints Malik Ayaz to the throne, making Lahore (modern Pakistan) the capital of the Ghaznavid Empire.
- The Chinese capital city of Kaifeng has some half a million residents by this year. Including all those present in the nine designated suburbs, the population is over a million people.

==== North America ====
- Vikings known to be residing in L'Anse aux Meadows on Newfoundland (island).

== Births ==
- December 8 – Wang Anshi, Chinese chancellor (d. 1086)
- Eudokia Makrembolitissa, Byzantine empress (d. 1096)
- Fujiwara no Kanshi, Japanese empress consort (d. 1102)
- Wugunai, Chinese chieftain of the Wanyan tribe (d. 1074)

== Deaths ==
- February 13 – Al-Hakim bi-Amr Allah, Fatimid caliph (b. 985)
- March 5 – Arnulf, French archbishop and illegitimate son of Lothair III
- March 16 – Heribert, archbishop of Cologne (b. c. 970)
- July 7 – Fujiwara no Akimitsu, Japanese bureaucrat (b. 944)
- August 17 – Erkanbald, German abbot and archbishop
- August 29 – Minamoto no Yorimitsu, Japanese nobleman (b. 948)
- Fujiwara no Yoshikane, Japanese nobleman (b. 957)
- Hamid al-Din al-Kirmani, Fatimid scholar and philosopher
- Hamza ibn 'Ali ibn-Ahmad, founding leader of the Druze
- Liu Mei, Chinese official and general (approximate date)
- Mac Cú Ceanain, king of Uí Díarmata (Ireland)
- Shams al-Dawla, Buyid emir of Hamadan (Iran)
- Trilochanapala, king of the Kabul Shani dynasty
