= 957 Caspian Sea earthquake =

Earthquake in Iran

- Local date: 957
- Epicenter: 35°57′N 52°06′E
- Areas affected: Persian Iraq

The 957 Caspian Sea earthquake took place in the Caspian Sea and its vicinity in 957 (Hijri year 346).

== History ==
The earthquake is mentioned by several Arab and Syriac chronicle writers, who claimed that it mainly affected the region of Persian Iraq. The initial shocks lasted 40 days, but ceased for a while. The main earthquake then occurred, damaging the cities of Ray, Talikan, and Hulwan. A reported number of 150 villages were supposedly destroyed by the earthquake.

The earthquake was described by among others Miskawayh (11th century), Ibn al-Jawzi (12th century), Bar Hebraeus (13th century), Ali ibn al-Athir (13th century), George Elmacin (13th century), Abu'l-Fida (14th century), Al-Suyuti (15th century), and Kâtip Çelebi (17th century).

Al-Suyuti's narrative indicates a severe paroxysm of this earthquake. He reported that a mountain in the vicinity of Ray sunk, and that a chasm (canyon) was created by the earthquake. Fetid water and smoke reportedly emerged from the chasm. An entire village was swallowed by the chasm, along with its inhabitants. Talikan reportedly sunk into the ground, and there were about 30 survivors from the city's population. Hulwan was engulfed. The earthquake caused water from the ground to emerge in the surface, and also caused bones from the city's tombs to resurface.

According to Al-Suyuti, Abu'l-Fida, and Bar Hebraeus, the Caspian Sea ("Great Sea" in their narratives), sunk 15 metres (8 fathoms), and retired 460 metres (500 yd) from its previous coast. New "rocks" (skerries) and islands appeared due to this withdrawal. Miskawayh reports that the changes in the coastal formations perplexed the sailors who navigated the Caspian Sea. An additional detail reported by a chronicle is that the Caspian Sea seemed to be in a state of convulsion at the time of the disaster.

The narratives indicate that this earthquake caused extensive faulting, and permanent crustal deformation. The deformation itself caused the elevation of the coasts of the Caspian Sea. It seems probable that the event also caused a "seismic sea wave" (tsunami), though this is not clearly indicated in the primary sources.

== Historical debates ==
The historians Johann Jakob Reiske (18th century) and E. A. Wallis Budge (20th century) interpreted the sources as indicating an earthquake in the Persian Gulf rather than the Caspian Sea. Robert Mallet (19th century) instead interpreted the sources as indicating the location of the earthquake in the Caspian Sea. At least some of the primary sources locate the areas affected by the earthquake within the province of Jibal in the Abbasid Caliphate.

== Sources ==
- Antonopoulos, J. (1980), Data from investigation of seismic Sea waves events in the Eastern Mediterranean from 500 to 1000 A.D., Annals of Geophysics
