= Faifne an Filí =

Irish poet (died 958)

Faifne an Filí, Ollamh of Leinster, died 958.

Faifne was an Irish poet who was regarded as the leading poet of the kingdom of Leinster in Ireland, upon his death in 958. He died the same year as Finshneachta Ua Cuill, a poet from the neighboring kingdom of Munster.

== Annalistic references ==
- M958.10. Faifne the Poet, chief poet of Leinster, died.

== See also ==
- Aedh Ua Raithnen, poet, died c. 954.
- Eochaidh Ua Floinn
