= Constantine Phokas =

10th-century Byzantine aristocrat and general

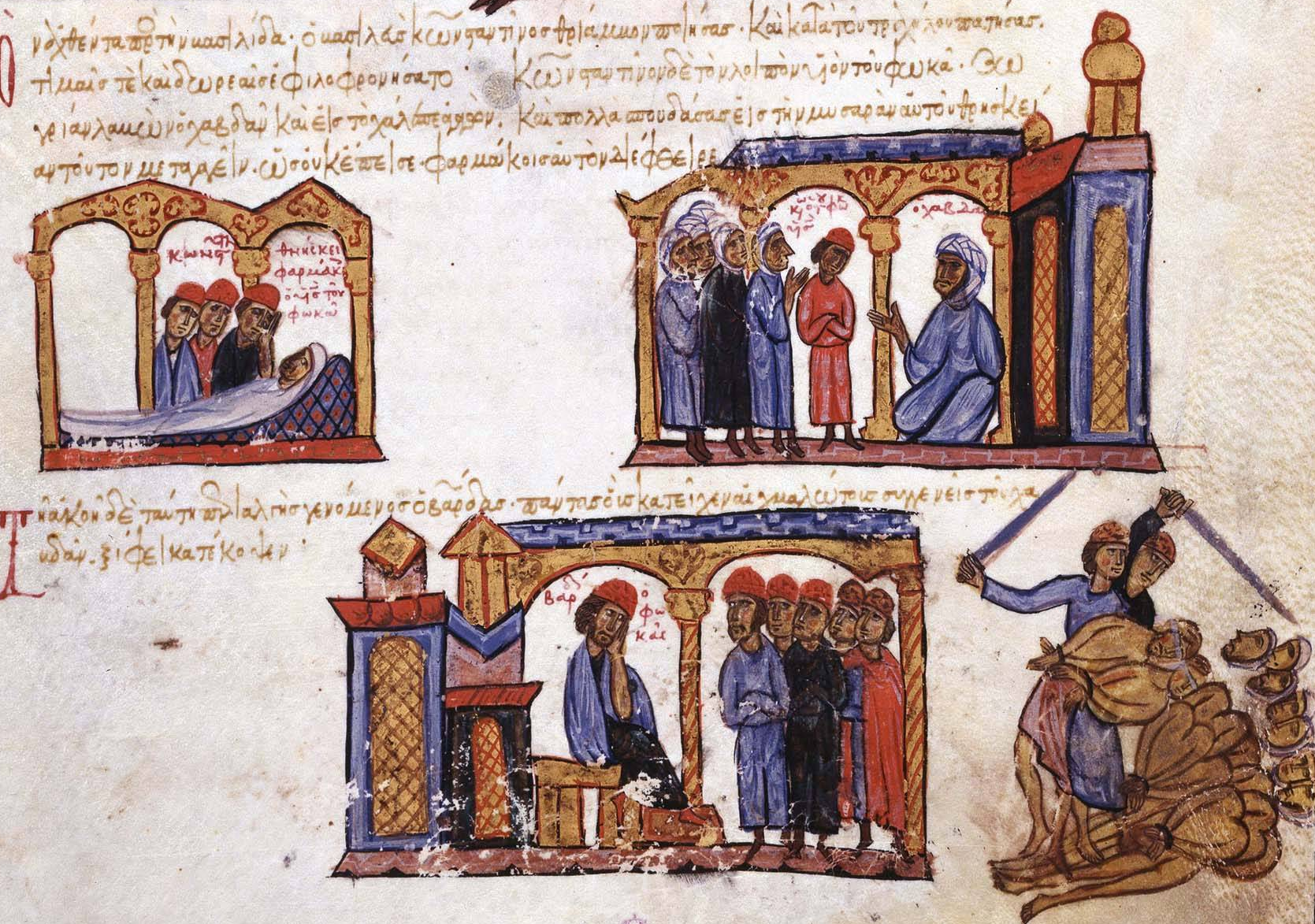
- Depiction in the Madrid Skylitzes of Constantine's alleged poisoning and death. His father, struck by grief, then orders the execution of all Muslim prisoners.
- Died: c. 954
- Allegiance: Byzantine Empire
- Service years: 945–953
- Rank: strategos
- Conflicts: Wars with Sayf al-Dawla

Constantine Phokas (Greek: Κωνσταντῖνος Φωκᾶς; died 953/954) was a Byzantine aristocrat and general.

== Life ==
Constantine was the youngest son of Bardas Phokas the Elder and of an unnamed lady from the Maleinos clan, and brother of the general and later emperor Nikephoros II Phokas and the general Leo Phokas the Younger. When his father was appointed as Domestic of the Schools (commander-in-chief of the Byzantine army) in 945, Constantine was appointed strategos (military governor) of the theme of Seleucia, on the Empire's southeastern border with the Muslim world.

He participated in his father's campaigns against the Muslims, and was captured by the Hamdanid Emir of Aleppo, Sayf al-Dawla, at the Battle of Marash in 953. Constantine took part in Sayf al-Dawla's subsequent triumphal entry into Aleppo, but he soon fell ill and died (probably in early 954). Some Byzantine sources suggest that he was poisoned by Sayf al-Dawla after refusing to convert to Islam, while Arab sources claim that he was poisoned by Byzantine agents after Sayf al-Dawla refused a huge ransom offered by Bardas Phokas. Whatever the truth, Constantine's death seems to have been blamed on Sayf al-Dawla by the Byzantines, and many Arab captives, including some of the Hamdanid emir's relatives, were executed as a result. Some Byzantine and Arab sources claim that this resulted in the failure of a peace embassy sent by the Byzantines in June 954 under Paul Monomachos, but modern scholars discount this.

== Sources ==
- Vasiliev, Alexander A. (1968). Byzance et les Arabes, Tome II: Les relations politiques de Byzance et des Arabes à l'époque de la dynastie macédonienne (les empereurs Basile I, Léon le Sage et Constantin VII Porphyrogénète) 867-959 (253-348). Première partie: Les relations politiques de Byzance et des Arabes à l'époque de la dynastie macédonienne. Première période, de 867 à 959. Corpus Bruxellense Historiae Byzantinae (in French). Vol. 2.1. French ed.: Henri Grégoire, Marius Canard. Brussels: Fondation Byzantine.
- Whittow, Mark (1996). The Making of Byzantium, 600–1025. Berkeley and Los Angeles, California: University of California Press. ISBN 978-0-520-20496-6.
- Wortley, John, ed. (2010). John Skylitzes: A Synopsis of Byzantine History, 811–1057. Cambridge: Cambridge University Press. ISBN 978-0-521-76705-7.
