= Tõnu Sepp =

Estonian musicologist

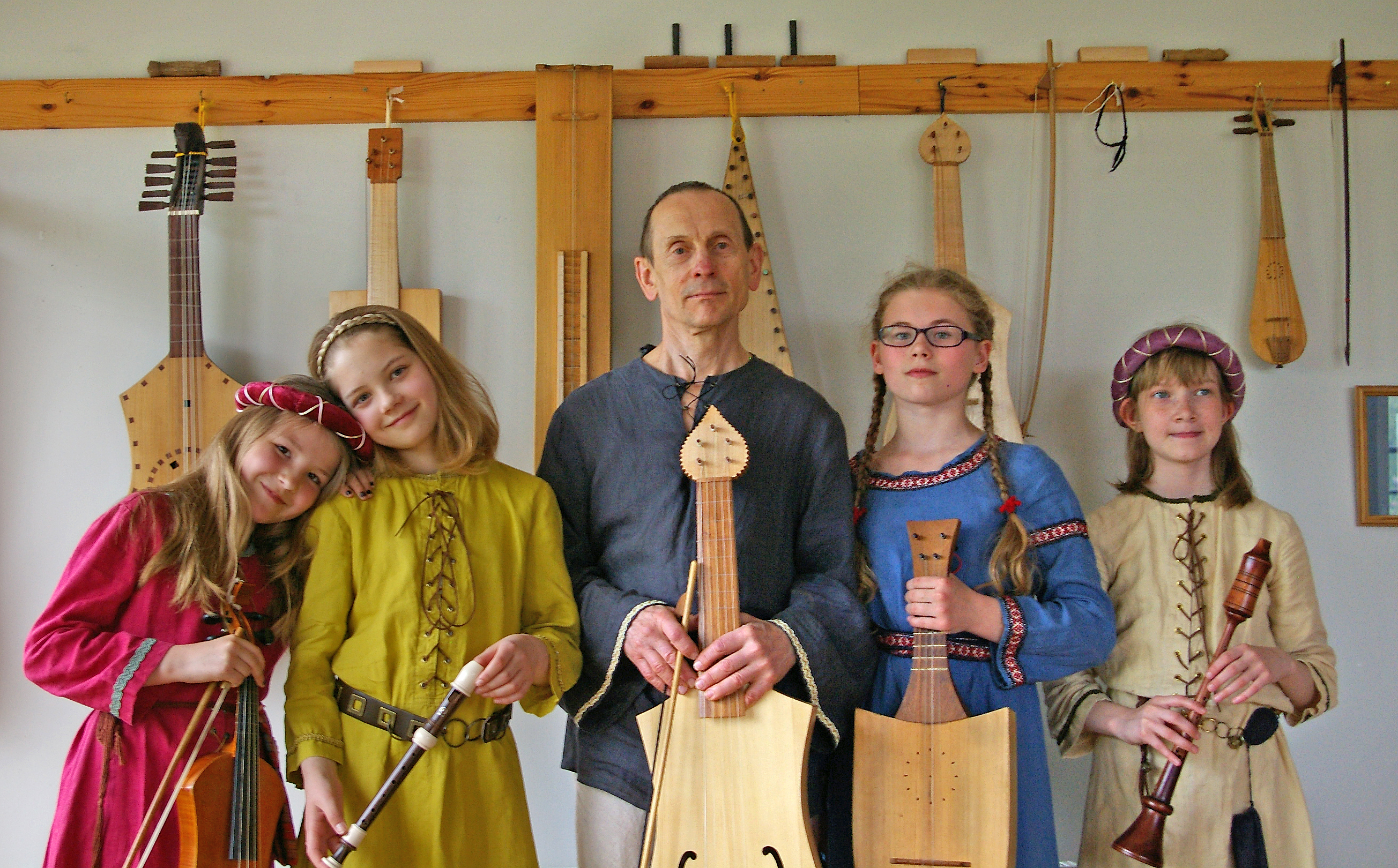
Tõnu Sepp with pupils of his studio

Tõnu Sepp (born June 14, 1946) is an Estonian music teacher and a figure in early music. He has been called the "grand old man" of early music in Estonia.

In 1971, in Viljandi, Sepp laid the ground for early music education in Estonia and also founded the first early music ensemble in Estonia. In 1982, he launched the internationally famous Viljandi Early Music Festival. Since 1995, his master class in Tallinn Old Town Educational College has grown into the Musica Silentii studio. The studio has been active in Tartu since 2006.

Sepp is also a renowned maker of musical instruments, having made hundreds of early music instruments.
