= Battle of Raban =

Battle Between Arabs and Byzantium

Coordinates: 37.7069°N 37.4600°E

- Part of the Arab–Byzantine wars
- Map of the Arab-Byzantine frontier zone
| Date | October/November 958 |
| Location | Raban, northern Syria (region) |
| Result | Byzantine victory |

Belligerents
| Byzantine Empire | Hamdanid Emirate of Aleppo |

Commanders and leaders
| John Tzimiskes; Basil Lekapenos | Sayf al-Dawla |

The Battle of Raban was an engagement fought in autumn 958 near the fortress of Raban (in modern-day Turkey) between the Byzantine army, led by John Tzimiskes (later emperor in 969–976), and the forces of the Hamdanid Emirate of Aleppo under the famed emir Sayf al-Dawla (r. 945–967). The battle was a major victory for the Byzantines, and contributed to the demise of Hamdanid military power, which in the early 950s had proven a great challenge to Byzantium.

== Background ==
In the period from 945 to 967, the Hamdanid Emir of Aleppo, Sayf al-Dawla, was the Byzantines' most persistent opponent on their eastern frontier, by virtue of his control over most of the Byzantine–Muslim borderlands (Thughur) and his commitment to jihad. Sayf al-Dawla had already campaigned against the Byzantines in 938 and 940, but it was after his establishment of a large domain centred on Aleppo in 945, that he began confronting them on an annual basis. Despite the numerical advantages enjoyed by the Byzantines, the Hamdanid's emergence blunted a Byzantine offensive that had been unfolding since the mid-920s and had already resulted in the fall of Malatya (934), Arsamosata (940), and Qaliqala (in 949).

His main enemy during the first decade of continuous conflict with the Byzantines was the Domestic of the Schools (commander-in-chief) Bardas Phokas. After a few initial failures, Sayf al-Dawla quickly established his supremacy: in 953, he heavily defeated Bardas near Marash. Expeditions led by Bardas in the next two years were also defeated, allowing Sayf al-Dawla to refortify his frontier zone and strengthen it against further Byzantine attacks. Using his light cavalry to evade the more slow-moving Byzantines, Sayf al-Dawla was also able to launch destructive raids deep into Byzantine territory; however, his raids avoided fortified positions, and he could not challenge effective Byzantine control over their recent conquests. After 955, however, the situation began to change: the ineffective Bardas Phokas was dismissed and replaced by his more capable son, Nikephoros, under whose supervision the Byzantine army's equipment was upgraded, its ranks filled with Armenians, and its training intensified. The new Byzantine leadership, which included Nikephoros's brother Leo and his nephew John Tzimiskes, resolved on a forward strategy and began raiding deep into Hamdanid territory.

== Tzimiskes's raids and the battle of Raban ==
In spring 956, Sayf al-Dawla pre-empted Tzimiskes from a planned assault on Amida in the Jazira, and invaded Byzantine territory first. Tzimiskes then seized a pass in Sayf al-Dawla's rear, and attacked him during his return. The hard-fought battle, fought amidst torrential rainfall, resulted in a Muslim victory as Tzimiskes lost 4,000 men. At the same time, however, Leo Phokas invaded Syria and defeated and captured Sayf al-Dawla's cousin, whom he had left behind in his stead. In 957, Nikephoros took and razed the fortress of Hadath, and in the next spring, Tzimiskes invaded the Jazira. There, he captured the fortress of Dara, and scored a crushing victory near Amida over an army led by one of Sayf al-Dawla's favourite lieutenants, the Circassian Nadja. Of Nadja's 10,000 troops, Tzimiskes reportedly killed half and captured more than half of the survivors.

Reinforced with more troops under the parakoimomenos Basil Lekapenos, in June, Tzimiskes then stormed Samosata and the fortress of Raban south of Hadath. It was there that Sayf al-Dawla himself came to confront him. The ensuing battle (taking place between 18 October and 15 November 958) was hard fought—Sayf al-Dawla's cousin and court poet Abu Firas is said to have broken two lances in his first charge—but in the end, the Byzantines prevailed and the Muslim army broke and fled. Many of Sayf al-Dawla's court companions and ghilman fell in the pursuit, while over 1,700 of his cavalry were captured and paraded in the streets of Constantinople.

== Aftermath ==
The victory at Raban made clear that the Byzantines were gaining the upper hand over the Hamdanids. Their success also enabled them to retain control of Samosata, meaning that they had broken through the fortified frontier zone protecting northern Syria. Nevertheless, the Hamdanid ruler was still in control of a potent military and capable of launching raids into Byzantine territory, until he suffered a catastrophic defeat in November 960 at the hands of Leo Phokas. Thereafter, Hamdanid military power was broken, Cilicia was annexed by the Byzantines in 964–965, and even Aleppo itself was captured briefly by the Byzantines in 962.

== Sources ==
- Bianquis, Thierry (1997). "Sayf al-Dawla". In Bosworth, C. E.; van Donzel, E.; Heinrichs, W. P. & Lecomte, G. (eds.). The Encyclopaedia of Islam, Second Edition. Volume IX: San–Sze. Leiden: E. J. Brill. pp. 103–110. ISBN 978-90-04-10422-8.
- Kennedy, Hugh N. (2004). The Prophet and the Age of the Caliphates: The Islamic Near East from the 6th to the 11th Century (Second ed.). Harlow: Longman. ISBN 978-0-58-240525-7.
- Shepard, Jonathan (2010). "Raban, Battle of". In Rogers, Clifford (ed.). The Oxford Encyclopedia of Medieval Warfare and Military Technology, Volume 3. Oxford: Oxford University Press. pp. 151–152. ISBN 978-0-19-533403-6.
- Treadgold, Warren (1997). A History of the Byzantine State and Society. Stanford, California: Stanford University Press. ISBN 0-8047-2630-2.
