= Roberto García-Calvo Montiel =

Spanish judge

Roberto García-Calvo Montiel (La Bañeza, 1942 – Villaviciosa de Odón, 2008) was a Spanish judge. Since 2001, he was a member of the Constitutional Court of Spain, sponsored by the conservative People's Party. In the last year of the Francoist State, García-Calvo served as a local official repressing workers strikes. During his serving in the highest court, he was considered as part of the persistence of the shadow of Francoism in the Spanish institutions. He died by natural causes on May 17, 2008 at aged 65 in Villaviciosa de Odón, Madrid.
