= Su Fengji =

Su Fengji (Chinese: 蘇逢吉; died January 2, 951) was a chancellor of China's Later Han dynasty during the Five Dynasties and Ten Kingdoms period. He was described as cruel and greedy. He committed suicide when Emperor Yin of Later Han was killed while trying to battle the general Guo Wei's rebellion.

== Background ==
It is not known when Su Fengji was born. He was said to be from Chang'an, but as his father Su Yue (蘇悅) was said to be at one time an honored official for "Shu" — probably Former Shu rather than Later Shu — it is not completely clear whether he was born there. His mother died early, and for quite a while Su Yue remained a widower with no attendants. Su Yue liked drinking all day, although not drinking a large amount, and it was said that he was not happy about meals that anyone prepared for him, but was only willing to eat when Su Fengji prepared the meal. (The historical account implicitly indicated that Su Fengji's mother was Su Yue's wife, as he had an older half-brother who was said to be born of a concubine; he also appeared to have younger brothers, although those younger brothers are not known to be born of his mother or not.) As Su Fengji learned writing skills at an early age, he would at times prepare reports for Su Yue. At one point, Su Yue served as a secretary for the major Later Jin general Liu Zhiyuan and was honored by Liu. He found a chance to tell Liu, "I am but a senile old man, with no talent or skill that is worthy. My son Fengji has rudimentary skills in writing, and his temperament is respectful and careful. If you, Lord, do not mind the weakness of a puppy, I would like to have him attend to you." Liu summoned Su Fengji, and finding Su Fengji to be energetic and handsome, took pity on him and kept him on staff. Whenever there would be important meetings, he would have Su Fengji stand next to him.

After Liu was made the military governor (Jiedushi) of Hedong Circuit (河東, headquartered in modern Taiyuan, Shanxi) in 940, Su Fengji was made his assistant. It was said that because Liu was stern and harsh, his staff members did not dare to see him much, causing matters that needed to be approved by him in his roles as military governor and governor (觀察使, Guanchashi) to pile up, but Su attended to him daily. Su would carry the files that needed approval around with him, and find times when Liu was agreeable to discussing the matters to do so. Often, Liu agreed with Su's recommendations. However, Su was said to be greedy, deceitful, and cruel. There was one time when Liu, for his own birthday, sent Su to the circuit prison to review the matters of the prisoners held there to, in Liu's words, "quiet the prison." Su went there, and decided to execute everyone still held there regardless of offense, and then reported back to Liu, "the prison is quiet."

== During Liu Zhiyuan's reign ==
In 947, Later Jin was destroyed by its northern neighbor Liao (Khitan), and Liao's Emperor Taizong claimed to be the emperor of China as well. Liu Zhiyuan initially postured as if he were going to submit to Liao, but soon declared himself emperor (of an initially unnamed state, but later known as Later Han). He made Su Fengji and another assistant, Su Yugui, chancellors, both with the titles of Zhongshu Shilang (中書侍郎) and Tong Zhongshu Menxia Pingzhangshi (同中書門下平章事). At that time, the state had just been founded, and there were no precedents for regulations. Su Fengji therefore decided many key matters, and he considered these things his responsibilities. However, as he was not learned, and he made decisions capriciously, the result was that Later Han laws lacked cohesion and were characterized by cruelty. Meanwhile, when Liu's general Shi Hongzhao attacked south but was initially stymied by the Liao-commissioned prefect of Ze Prefecture (澤州, in modern Jincheng, Shanxi), Zhai Lingqi (翟令奇), Liu considered recalling Shi and hesitated in his initial plans to head south himself. Su Fengji and Yang Bin, however, pointed out that that would be viewed as a sign of weakness, and when Shi concurred, Liu had Shi continue the advance. Shi was shortly after able to persuade Zhai to surrender, and then advance to Luoyang. Shortly after, Liu was able to head south and take over Luoyang and the former Later Jin capital Daliang, allowing him to be viewed as the emperor of the Central Plains. As Liao's Emperor Taizong had taken the Later Jin chancellors Feng Dao and Li Song north, Liu awarded Feng's mansion to Su Yugui and Li's mansion to Su Fengji. All of the goods that Li stored at his mansion was seized by Su Fengji, as was an additional property that Li had at Luoyang.

Part of the harsh laws that Liu immediately promulgated, as emperor, was that, because of the seriousness of the banditry in the realm at that time, that all thieves, no matter how much they stole, would be executed, and a number of special officers were commissioned to chase after the bandits. Su Fengji considered that insufficient, and he drafted an edict, which would have ordered that not only of the thieves, but the thieves' neighbors, would have their families slaughtered. While other officials objected, arguing that not even the thieves' own families should be slaughtered, and certainly not neighbors, but Su argued strenuously for it. Eventually, Liu issued an edict of what he viewed as a compromise — that while the neighbors would be put to death, their families would not. Not long after, this led to an infamous slaughter of 17 villagers in Pingyin (平陰, in modern Jinan, Shandong). Despite this, it was said that Su Fengji and Su Yugui were deeply trusted by the emperor, such that no one could alienate him from them; he entrusted them with all governmental matters, while entrusting all military matters to Yang Bin and Guo Wei. Su Fengji was said to be particularly greedy and making no attempt to avoid showing it. Against the Confucian protocols of proper familial respect, he did not change into mourning clothes for his stepmother's death. When his older half-brother, born of his father's concubine, came to visit his mansion but met with his sons first rather than him, he became upset, and he found excuses to persuade Guo to have his half-brother executed. While the imperial scholar Li Tao mildly spoke against the two Su chancellors for their capricious actions, he soon became an ally of Su Fengji's, such that they referred to each other as uncle and nephew. At Su Fengji's recommendations, Liu made Li, as well as Dou Zhengu, chancellors as well, joining the Sus, in fall 947, as he was set to join the generals Gao Xingzhou and Murong Yanchao (Liu's half-brother) against the rebellious general Du Chongwei. At that time, Su Fengji received the title of Zuo Pushe (左僕射) and was put in charge of editing the imperial history. He was said to favor luxurious living in his clothes and food, eating nothing but delicacies at his house and refusing to eat the meals served at the office of the chancellors. When his wife Lady Wu died, he held a grand funeral for her, and he prepared mourning clothes for officials under him, to attend the funeral.

In spring 948, Liu fell seriously ill. He entrusted his younger son Liu Chengyou to Su Fengji, Yang, Shi, and Guo, stating, "My remaining breaths are getting short, and I cannot speak much. Chengyou is young and weak, so what happens after my death has to be entrusted to you." He also told them to guard against Du Chongwei (who had surrendered and was residing at Daliang in retirement). After Liu Zhiyuan died the same day, these officials, without announcing his death, had Du and his sons put to death. Liu Chengyou was created the Prince of Zhou, and shortly after, when Liu Zhiyuan's death was announced, Liu Chengyou succeeded him as emperor.

== During Liu Chengyou's reign ==
Early in Liu Chengyou's reign, the high-level officials were in a collective leadership, with different responsibilities. However, Yang Bin, as chief of staff (Shumishi), oversaw the government overall, and when the chancellors, led by Su Fengji, wanted to promote officials and fill unfilled positions, Yang saw the requests as wasteful and often rejected them, causing the chancellors to be displeased. In spring 948, Li Tao submitted a petition to Liu Chengyou suggesting that Yang and Guo Wei (who was then deputy chief of staff) be given military commands outside the capital and that key matters be decided by Su Fengji and Su Yugui. When Yang and Guo heard of this, they went to see Liu Chengyou's mother (Liu Zhiyuan's wife) Empress Dowager Li, stating to her, "Your subjects have followed the deceased emperor ever since difficult times. Now, the Son of Heaven is accepting other people's word and wants to send us out. Given that there are troubles west of the pass [(i.e., in the Guanzhong region, where the general Wang Jingchong was fostering a rebellion)], how can we, your subjects and ignore the affairs of the state? If we are not to remain, we hope to at least remain until the deceased emperor's burial." Empress Dowager Li was angered, and she went to Liu Chengyou, stating to him, "These are the old and accomplished subjects of the state. Why are you listening to others and expelling them?" When Liu Chengyou blamed the matter on the chancellors in general, Li Tao took the blame by himself, and was relieved of his chancellor position. Subsequently, Yang was given an additional chancellor position, while Guo was made co-chief of staff, such that Yang became the main decision-maker, with the two Su chancellors (along with Dou Zhengu) no longer having real chancellor authority.

Meanwhile, Li Song, whose mansion had been given to Su Fengji, had returned from Liao and been given an honorary position with little power, and, knowing that he did not have allies at the Later Han court, was careful in his behavior. However, his younger brothers Li Yu (李嶼) and Li Yi (李㠖) were not so careful, and, as they served as lower-leveled officials with Su Fengji's sons and brothers, often complained, when drunk, "You took our houses and possessions!" Su therefore began to despise them, and when Li Song shortly after presented the deeds of the houses to Su, it had the effect of irritating Su further rather than soothing him. In winter 948, when Li Yu discovered that his servant Ge Yanyu (葛延遇) was embezzling from him and tried to recover the funds from Ge, Ge got together with Su's servant Li Cheng (李澄) and considered submitting a false accusation that Li Yu was planning treason. When Su heard of this, he encouraged the report, and subsequently, Li Song and his family members were arrested. Subsequently, under torture, Li Yu wrote out a confession in which he implicated not only himself, but Li Song and Li Yi, as well as his nephew Wang Ning (王凝) and 20 servants, of plotting a rebellion at Daliang, in conspiracy with the general Li Shouzhen, who had earlier rebelled at Huguo Circuit (護國, headquartered in modern Yuncheng, Shanxi), and Liao. When this confession was submitted to Su, Su thought that the idea that a rebellion could be carried out with 20 servants was not convincing, and therefore took a pen and changed "20" (二十) to "50" (五十). As a result, Li Song's family was slaughtered.

In 949, after Guo suppressed Li Shouzhen's rebellion, Guo declined to be honored alone for his achievements, and therefore all of the high-level officials were honored. In Su Fengji's case, he was given the honorific title Sikong (司空, one of the Three Excellencies).

In summer 950, an incident occurred to damage the relationship between the leading officials. They had discussed and resolved that, because of frequent Liao incursions and the inability for the circuits to coordinate their defenses, Guo Wei should be sent to Yedu (鄴都, in modern Handan, Hebei) to serve as its defender (as well as the military governor of Tianxiong Circuit (天雄, headquartered at Yedu) to coordinate the defense against Liao. Shi advocated that Guo be allowed to continue to retain his title as chief of staff to allow him to give orders to the military governors. Su Fengji opposed, pointing out that there had been no precedent to allow a military governor to continue to retain chief of staff title. Eventually, Liu Chengyou approved Shi's proposal. When Shi then complained to Su about his opposition, Su responded, "Letting the central government control the outlying circuits is proper. How can it be that now you are letting an outlying circuit control the central government?"

It was at the send-off dinner for Guo the next day, at Dou's mansion, that frictions within the imperial government came to the forefront. At the feast, Shi, when toasting Guo, spoke in a harsh voice, "How could there have been opposition when we discussed this matter yesterday at the imperial gathering? Now, let us drink, younger brother [(i.e., Guo)]!" Su and Yang also raised their cups and stated, "This is an important matter for the state. Do not bear grudges!" Shi responded, again in a harsh voice, "To settle the state, it takes long spears and large swords. What use does the ink brush have?" Wang Zhang, the director of the financial agencies, responded, "Without ink brushes, where does money come from?" It was said that from this point on, there were increasing tension between generals and chancellors. Later, when Guo was about to leave the capital, he went to see Liu Chengyou and stated to him:

The Empress Dowager had long followed the deceased Emperor, and she has experienced many things. Your Imperial Majesty is your prime years. If there are important matters, it is best to ask her advice and follow it. You should be close to the faithful and honest, and be far away from the slanderous and the wicked. Be careful in examining between good and evil. Su Fengji, Yang Bin, and Shi Hongzhao are all the deceased Emperor's old subjects. They are faithful and caring for the state. May it be that Your Imperial Majesty trust them and use them, and there will be no trouble. As far as what happens on the battlefield, I, your subject, wishes to expend all of my foolish and foolhardy efforts, hopefully being worthy of your service.

Liu Chengyou showed a serious expression and thanked Guo. However, the tension between the officials continued. Not long after Guo's departure, Wang hosted a feast for the honored officials. During the feast, there was a drinking game that Shi was unfamiliar with. The director of diplomatic protocol, Yan Jinqing (閻晉卿), was seated next to Shi, and repeatedly reminded him of what the game's rules were. Su joked, "When you are seated next to someone named Yan, you need not fear being punished." However, Shi took the comment badly — as he thought that Su was satirizing his wife Lady Yan, who was once a prostitute working in a drinking hall. He cursed Su, and when Su did not respond, got up and wanted to batter Su. As a response, Su left, and he took a sword and considered chasing after Su. Yang wept and urged him to stop, stating, "Lord Su is a chancellor. If you, Lord, killed him, what kind of a place are you putting the Son of Heaven into? Please think carefully!" Shi thereafter got on a horse and left, and Yang followed him on a horse as well, not leaving him until he reached his manor. When Liu Chengyou heard of this, he sent the director of palace affairs, Wang Jun, to try to moderate, but could not repair the relationship between them. Su considered requesting an assignment as a circuit military governor, but then decided that if he left the capital, Shi could easily destroy him, and so did not. Wang, however, did request such an assignment, but Yang and Shi urged him against leaving the capital.

By winter 950, Liu Chengyou himself had tired of the control the senior officials had on his government, even though, under Yang's leadership, the imperial government was considered well-run, and Shi's overseeing of the capital made it safe for the public. Part of the friction came from how his close associates and relatives of the empress dowager were trying to gain power, but were being thwarted by Yang and Shi. At that time, Empress Dowager Li's younger brother Li Ye (李業) was serving as the director of miscellaneous affairs (武德使, Wudeshi) inside the palace, but wanted to be promoted to the higher position of director of palace affairs, a desire that Liu Chengyou and Empress Dowager Li were both in concurrence with, but Yang and Shi considered inappropriate as he lacked the seniority, so they stopped his commission. Further, Hou Kuangzan (後匡贊) the director of imperial stables, Guo Yunming (郭允明) the director of tea and wine, and Nie Wenjin (聶文進) the liaison officer at the office of the chiefs of staff, were all favored by Liu Chengyou, but had long not been promoted, causing them to be resentful. When Liu Chengyou wanted to make his favorite concubine Consort Geng empress, Yang considered it too quick after the expiration of his morning period for Liu Zhiyuan, and so opposed it. When Consort Geng died, Yang opposed Liu Chengyou's wishes to have her buried with the ceremonies due an empress. Further, there was an occasion when Yang and Shi were discussing state matters with Liu Chengyou, Liu Chengyou made the comment, "Be careful! Do not let others get a chance to criticize you!" Yang responded, "Your Imperial Majesty should just be quiet. Your subjects are still here." This led to Liu Chengyou's resentment toward them, and his close associates thereafter falsely accused Yang and the others of plotting against him. As Su resented Shi, he also incited Li Ye and the others.

Liu Chengyou, thereafter, plotted with Li Ye, Nie, Hou, and Guo Yunming to kill Yang and the others. Liu Chengyou reported his plans to Empress Dowager Li, who responded, "How can such things be easily considered! You should discuss with the chancellors further." However, Li Ye then stated, "The deceased Emperor had said before that the matters of the state should not be discussed with scholars. Their timidity will ruin you." When Empress Dowager Li tried to speak again, Liu Chengyou responded angrily, "The matters of state cannot be decided in the halls of a woman!"

On December 24, 950, as the officials were arriving at the palace for the imperial gathering, a number of soldiers appeared and killed Yang, Shi, and Wang Zhang. Subsequently, Liu Chengyou declared that they had committed treason, and stated to the chancellors and the other officials, "Yang Bin and the others viewed us as a young child. We finally now get to be your true lord. You should not worry!" He sent soldiers to arrest and kill the relatives and close associates of Yang, Shi, and Wang. As part of the post-slaughter moves, Liu Chengyou made Su the acting chief of staff. The slaughter shocked Su, who, while he resented Shi, did not expect something like this to happen, and he privately told his associates, "This was done too quickly. If the Emperor had consulted me about this, it would not have happened."

As part of the post-slaughter moves, Liu Chengyou also had the families of Guo Wei and Wang Jun (who was then serving as Guo's assistant) slaughtered, and he also sent emissaries to order the executions of Guo and Wang Jun. The emissaries were arrested and turned over to Guo, however, by Empress Dowager Li's brother Li Hongyi (李洪義). Guo thereafter rebelled and marched on Daliang. Liu Chengyou, against Empress Dowager Li's advice, went out of the capital to try to encourage the imperial troops (which he put Murong Yanchao in charge of) in opposition to Guo, with the three chancellors (Su Fengji, Su Yugui, and Dou) accompanying him. After Guo's troops defeated the imperial troops, Murong fled, and the imperial troops collapsed. Liu Chengyou was killed in the confusion, and Su Fengji, Yan, and Guo Yunming committed suicide. Guo Wei had their heads, along with Nie's, hung on the north gate of Daliang. Later, after Guo Wei seized the throne and established Later Zhou as its emperor, he gave Su's son a mansion at Luoyang.

== Notes and references ==
- Old History of the Five Dynasties, vol. 108.
- New History of the Five Dynasties, vol. 30.
- Zizhi Tongjian, vols. 286, 287, 288, 289.
