= Nicole Irving =

Australian swimmer (born 1982)

Nicole Irving (Dorsamy)
Personal information
- Full name: Nicole Irving (Dorsamy)
- Nationality: Australian
- Born: 14 June 1982 (age 44)
- Height: 1.65 m (5 ft 5 in)
- Weight: 58 kg (128 lb)
- Spouse(s): Will Dorsamy, Australian businessman (m. 2006)
- Children: 4

Sport
- Sport: Swimming
- Strokes: butterfly
Medal record
Commonwealth Games
Silver medal – second place	2002 Manchester	50 m butterfly
- Updated on 16 January 2014

Nicole Irving (born 14 June 1982) is an Australian swimmer.

== Career ==
Irving first competed for Australia at the 2002 FINA World Swimming Championships (25 m) in Moscow where she finished 7th in the 50 metre butterfly in 26.94. At the 2002 Commonwealth Games in Manchester, Irving won silver in the 50 metre butterfly in 27.13 finishing behind fellow Australian Petria Thomas.
