= Sa'd al-Dawla =

Sa'd al-Dawla may refer to:

- Sa'd al-Dawla of Aleppo, 10th-century Hamdanid emir
- Sa'd al-Dawla al-Safi ibn Hibatullah, 13th-century Jewish physician of Persia
