= Fujiwara no Sanesuke =

Japanese statesman and aristocrat

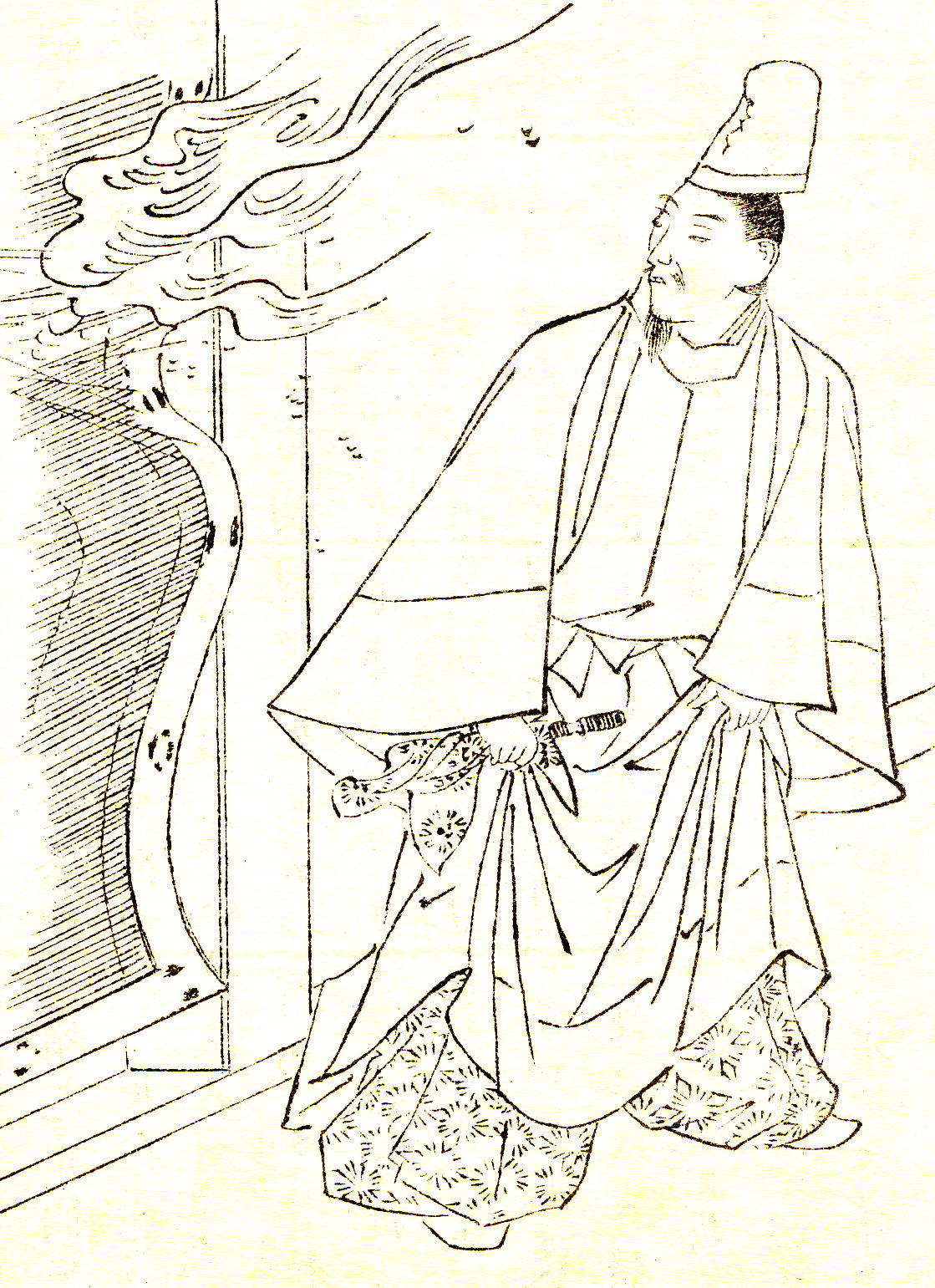
Portrait of Fujiwara no Sanesuke by Kikuchi Yōsai (1781–1878).

Fujiwara no Sanesuke (藤原 実資; 957 – February 26, 1046), also known as Go-Ono no Miya (後小野宮), was a Japanese statesman and aristocrat.

== Biography ==
He was born the fourth son of Fujiwara no Tadatoshi. He became the adopted heir to his grandfather Saneyori, the head of Ononomiya family (小野宮家), and he inherited a vast estate and documents of the Ononomiya family.

He became udaijin (Minister of the Right) in 1021. Sanesuke had a thorough knowledge of customs and rites, so he was called Kenjin Ufu (賢人右府) (wise Udaijin).

He wrote the diary Shōyūki (小右記) for fifty years. He died at the age of 90.

Sanesuke is mentioned in the diary of Murasaki Shikibu, the author of Genji Monogatari. In it, she praises him for being out of the ordinary, and describes in detail a number of occasions of his superstitious behavior. In the Diary, Sanesuke is described as having summoned exorcists on a number of occasions, and employed children in the beating of gongs to cure him of illness or nightmares.

== Family and issue ==
He was married to a daughter of Minamoto no Koremasa (descendant of Emperor Montoku), and also married to Princess Enshi (婉子女王), daughter of Imperial Prince Tamehira. She was a consort of Emperor Kazan and married to Sanesuke after the Emperor became a priest. Neither of these two marriages produced a child. He adopted nephews. Later in life, he fathered two children by maids.

- Ryōen (良円) - priest
- Chifuru (千古) (daughter) - married to Fujiwara no Kaneyori (son of Fujiwara no Yorimune)

Two adopted children are the sons of Fujiwara no Kanehira. Kanehira was Sanesuke's elder brother.

- (adopted son) Sukehira (資平) (986–1068) - heir of Ononomiya family
- (adopted son) Sukeyori (資頼)
