= Battle of Marash (953) =

Battle fought between Byzantine empire & Hamdanid Emir

- Part of the Arab–Byzantine wars
- Map of the Arab-Byzantine frontier zone
Date	953
Location	Marash 37.5833°N 36.9333°E
Result	Hamdanid victory

Belligerents
Byzantine Empire	Hamdanid Emirate of Aleppo

Commanders and leaders
Bardas Phokas the Elder (WIA)	Sayf al-Dawla

Strength
Unknown, but considerably larger than the Hamdanid force	600 cavalry

The Battle of Marash was fought in 953 near Marash (modern Kahramanmaraş) between the forces of the Byzantine Empire under the Domestic of the Schools Bardas Phokas the Elder, and of the Hamdanid Emir of Aleppo, Sayf al-Dawla, the Byzantines' most intrepid enemy during the mid-10th century. Despite being outnumbered, the Arabs defeated the Byzantines who broke and fled. Bardas Phokas himself barely escaped through the intervention of his attendants, and suffered a serious wound on his face, while his youngest son and governor of Seleucia, Constantine Phokas, was captured and held a prisoner in Aleppo until his death of an illness some time later. This debacle, coupled with defeats in 954 and again in 955, led to Bardas Phokas' dismissal as Domestic of the Schools, and his replacement by his eldest son, Nikephoros Phokas (later emperor in 963–969).

== Background ==
In the period from 945 to 967, the Hamdanid Emir of Aleppo, Sayf al-Dawla, was the Byzantines' most persistent opponent on their eastern frontier, by virtue of his control over most of the Byzantine–Muslim borderlands (Thughur) and his commitment to jihad. After his establishment of a large domain centred on Aleppo in 945, the Hamdanid prince began confronting the Byzantines on an annual basis. Despite the numerical advantage enjoyed by the Byzantines, the Hamdanid's emergence blunted a Byzantine offensive that had been unfolding since the mid-920s and had already resulted in the fall of Malatya (934), Arsamosata (940), and Qaliqala (in 949).

Sayf al-Dawla's main opponent during the first decade of continuous conflict with the Byzantines was the Domestic of the Schools (commander-in-chief) Bardas Phokas, who had been appointed to the post in 945. Phokas was the personal choice of Emperor Constantine VII, who needed a reliable ally in this critical post. An experienced soldier, Phokas was by now well into his sixties, and not up to the task entrusted to him: even sources favourably disposed to the Phokades commented on Bardas that although a good general under someone else's command, he was unable to adequately fulfil the role of commander-in-chief. Sayf al-Dawla, on the other hand, has come down to us—mainly through the work of his court poets—as the archetype of Arab chivalry and a great warrior, but he was greatly hampered by lack of men and money, by rebellions in his domains, and by lack of support from the rest of the Muslim world.

== Campaign of 953 ==
In early 953, Sayf al-Dawla launched what was perhaps his most memorable campaign. From Aleppo he marched to Harran and Duluk, crossed the Anti-Taurus Mountains over the pass of Darb al-Qulla (modern Erkenek) and marched north into Byzantine territory. He captured the fortress of Arqa, and ravaged the surroundings of Malatya. From there he essayed to cross the mountains and return to Syria, but found the pass in front of him blocked by Bardas' youngest son, Constantine Phokas. The Muslims tried to break through the Byzantine position, but their attacks were repulsed with many casualties on both sides. Unable to return to Syria over the mountains, Sayf al-Dawla resolved to bypass the Byzantine forces holding the passes, and turned his army north. After marching past Malatya, ravaging the countryside once more, he crossed the Euphrates into Anzitene, which his troops also raided extensively, and re-entered the Muslim-held territory of Diyar Bakr. There, he was informed that in the meantime, the Byzantines under Bardas Phokas had invaded northern Syria and raided as far as Antioch. At once he turned his army south and west. Riding at great speed, he re-crossed the Euphrates at Samosata and arrived once more at Duluk, where he received news that the Byzantines were already on their march home.

According to the reports of his panegyrists, Sayf al-Dawla only had 600 riders to face the much larger Byzantine army. The Arabs caught up with the Byzantines at Gayhan near Marash, and scored a great victory. No details are known of the fight, but the Byzantines suffered many casualties, including the patrikios Leo Maleinos. Bardas Phokas himself was wounded and was forced to hide in a basement to escape capture, while Constantine Phokas was taken captive with several other unnamed Byzantine leaders to Aleppo. Sayf al-Dawla also recovered the booty taken by the Byzantines and liberated their Muslim prisoners. Constantine was held captive at Aleppo for some time, but died in captivity as a result of an illness, although various authors, both Arabs and Byzantines, have suggested that he was poisoned. In retaliation, Bardas Phokas is said to have ordered the execution of many Muslim prisoners, including some of Sayf al-Dawla's relatives.

== Sources ==
- Kennedy, Hugh N. (2004). The Prophet and the Age of the Caliphates: The Islamic Near East from the 6th to the 11th Century (Second ed.). Harlow, UK: Pearson Education Ltd. ISBN 0-582-40525-4.
- Treadgold, Warren (1997). A History of the Byzantine State and Society. Stanford, California: Stanford University Press. ISBN 0-8047-2630-2.
- Vasiliev, A.A. (1968). Byzance et les Arabes, Tome II, 1ére partie: Les relations politiques de Byzance et des Arabes à L'époque de la dynastie macédonienne (867–959) (in French). French ed.: Henri Grégoire, Marius Canard. Brussels: Éditions de l'Institut de Philologie et d'Histoire Orientales.
- Whittow, Mark (1996). The Making of Byzantium, 600–1025. Berkeley: University of California Press. ISBN 978-0-520-20496-6.
