= Fujiwara no Yoshikane =

Japanese Heian era courtier

Fujiwara no Yoshikane (藤原 義懐) (957–1021) was a Japanese Heian era courtier. A son of Fujiwara no Koretada, he served under Emperor Kazan before joining his brother Korenari, and the Emperor in becoming monks, in 986. He also prevented the Emperor from committing suicide following the death of his wife Tsune-ko.
