= Talikan =

Coordinates: 36°47′03″N 50°15′30″E

Talikan تليكان
- Village
- Interactive map of Talikan
- Country: Iran
- Province: Gilan
- County: Rudsar
- Bakhsh: Rahimabad
- Rural District: Shuil

Population (2006)
  - Total: 43
- Time zone: UTC+3:30 (IRST)
  - Summer (DST): UTC+4:30 (IRDT)

Talikan (Persian: تليكان, also Romanized as Talīkān) is a village in Shuil Rural District, Rahimabad District, Rudsar County, Gilan Province, Iran. At the 2006 census, its population was 43, in 11 families.
