= Guadamir =

Guadamir (Latin: Wadimirus, Wadamirus; died 14 June 957) was the bishop of Vic from 948 until his death.

Prior to Guadimir, the cathedral chapter and the bishop received incomes from different revenue streams, and the chapter's revenue was divided to give separate incomes to each of the canons (priests), although both revenue streams were controlled by the bishop. The canons complained to Guadamir that he had dissipated their revenues, a charge he admitted. On his deathbed on 10 June 957, he reformed the system by combining episcopal and capitular revenues while retaining separate incomes for the canons and the bishop. Ostensibly, his motive was to increase communal feeling among the brothers by increasing their financial security. Although Guadamir's division—one third of revenues from the market, tolls, pasturage rights and the mint were to go to the chapter—remained in force long after his death, it was rarely followed, and required re-confirmation by Bishop Oliba in 1038 (to little effect).
