= Finshneachta Ua Cuill =

Finshneachta Ua Cuill, Irish poet, died 958.

Finshneachta was an obscure Irish poet who was regarded as the leading poet of the kingdom of Munster in Ireland, upon his death in 958. He died on the same year that Faifne an Filí, chief poet of Leinster, died.

== Annalistic references ==
- 958. Finshneachta Ua Cuill, poet of Munster, died.

== See also ==
Other tenth-century Irish poets included:

- Cináed ua hArtacáin
- Eochaid ua Flannacáin
- Torpaid mac Taicthech
