= Fujiwara no Korenari =

Japanese courtier

Fujiwara no Korenari (藤原 惟成) (953–989) was a Japanese courtier of the Heian era. A son of Fujiwara no Masaki, he served the Emperor Kazan and joined the Emperor in entering the Kazan-in monastery in 986.
