= Seleucia (theme) =

Province of the Byzantine Empire

Theme of Seleucia Σελευκεία, θέμα Σελευκείας
- Theme of the Byzantine Empire
- 927/934–1070s 1099/1100 – c. 1180
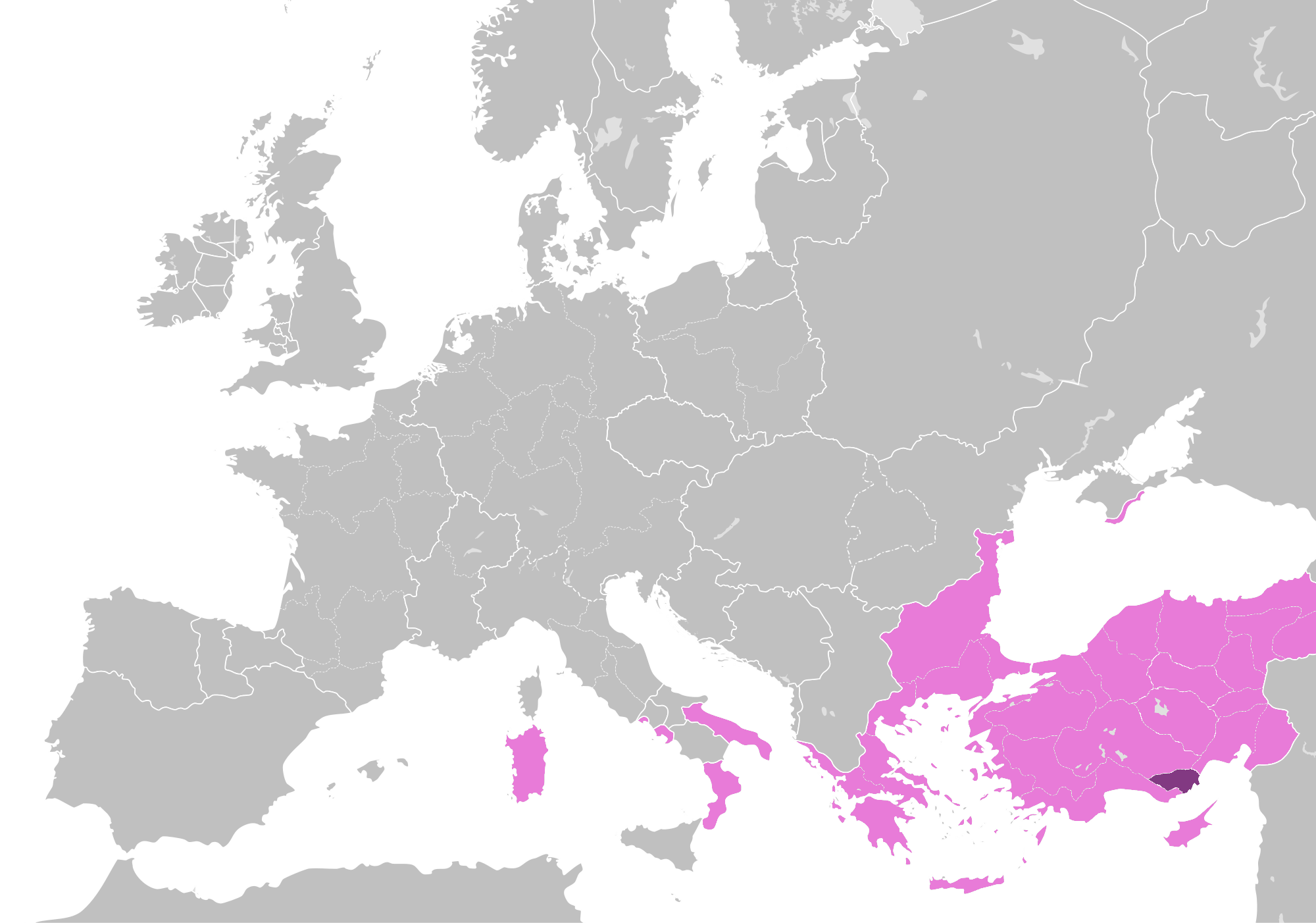
- Map of the Theme of Seleucia within the Byzantine Empire in 1000 AD.
- Capital: Seleucia in Isauria
- Historical era: Middle Ages
  - Established: 927–934
  - Conquest by Seljuks: 1070s
  - Byzantine recovery: 1099/1100
  - Conquest by Armenians.: 8 November 1180
- Today part of: Turkey

The Theme of Seleucia (Greek: θέμα Σελευκείας, thema Seleukeias) was a Byzantine theme (a military-civilian province) in the southern coast of Asia Minor (modern Turkey), headquartered at Seleucia (modern Silifke).

== History ==
In Late Antiquity, the port of Seleucia was the chief city of the Roman province of Isauria and seat of the comes Isauriae. In the 8th century, it is attested as a subordinate command, first under a tourmarches and then under a droungarios, of the naval theme of the Cibyrrhaeots. In the early 9th century, however, it appears as a small kleisoura (a fortified frontier command) sandwiched between the larger Byzantine themes of the Cibyrrhaeots, the Anatolics, and Cappadocia and the sea, and bordering on the Abbasid Caliphate's domains in Cilicia along the river Lamos. According to the Arab geographers Qudamah ibn Ja'far and Ibn Khordadbeh, in the 9th century the kleisoura comprised Seleucia as capital and ten other fortresses, with 5,000 men, out of which 500 were cavalry.

The kleisoura was raised to the status of a full theme sometime in the reign of Romanos I Lekapenos (r. 920–944), most likely c. 927–934. According to the De Thematibus of Emperor Constantine VII (r. 913–959), the theme was divided in two commands, one for the hinterland and a coastal/maritime one.

The region fell into the hands of the Seljuk Turks after the Battle of Manzikert in 1071. At the time, the mountainous interior of the region was predominantly inhabited by Armenians who had settled there over the previous century. The Byzantines recovered the area and refortified Seleucia and Corycus in 1099/1100, after which it became anew the seat of a Byzantine military governor (doux). It remained a Byzantine province until shortly after 1180, when it was conquered by the Armenian Kingdom of Cilicia.

== Sources ==
- Foss, Clive (1991). "Seleukeia". In Kazhdan, Alexander (ed.). The Oxford Dictionary of Byzantium. Oxford and New York: Oxford University Press. p. 1866. ISBN 0-19-504652-8.
- Hild, Friedrich; Hellenkemper, Hansgerd (1990). Tabula Imperii Byzantini, Band 5: Kilikien und Isaurien (in German). Vienna: Verlag der Österreichischen Akademie der Wissenschaften. ISBN 978-3-7001-1811-4.
- Oikonomides, Nicolas (1972). Les listes de préséance byzantines des IXe et Xe siècles (in French). Paris: Editions du Centre National de la Recherche Scientifique.
- Pertusi, A. (1952). Constantino Porfirogenito: De Thematibus (in Italian). Rome: Biblioteca Apostolica Vaticana.
