= Military history of the Five Dynasties and Ten Kingdoms =

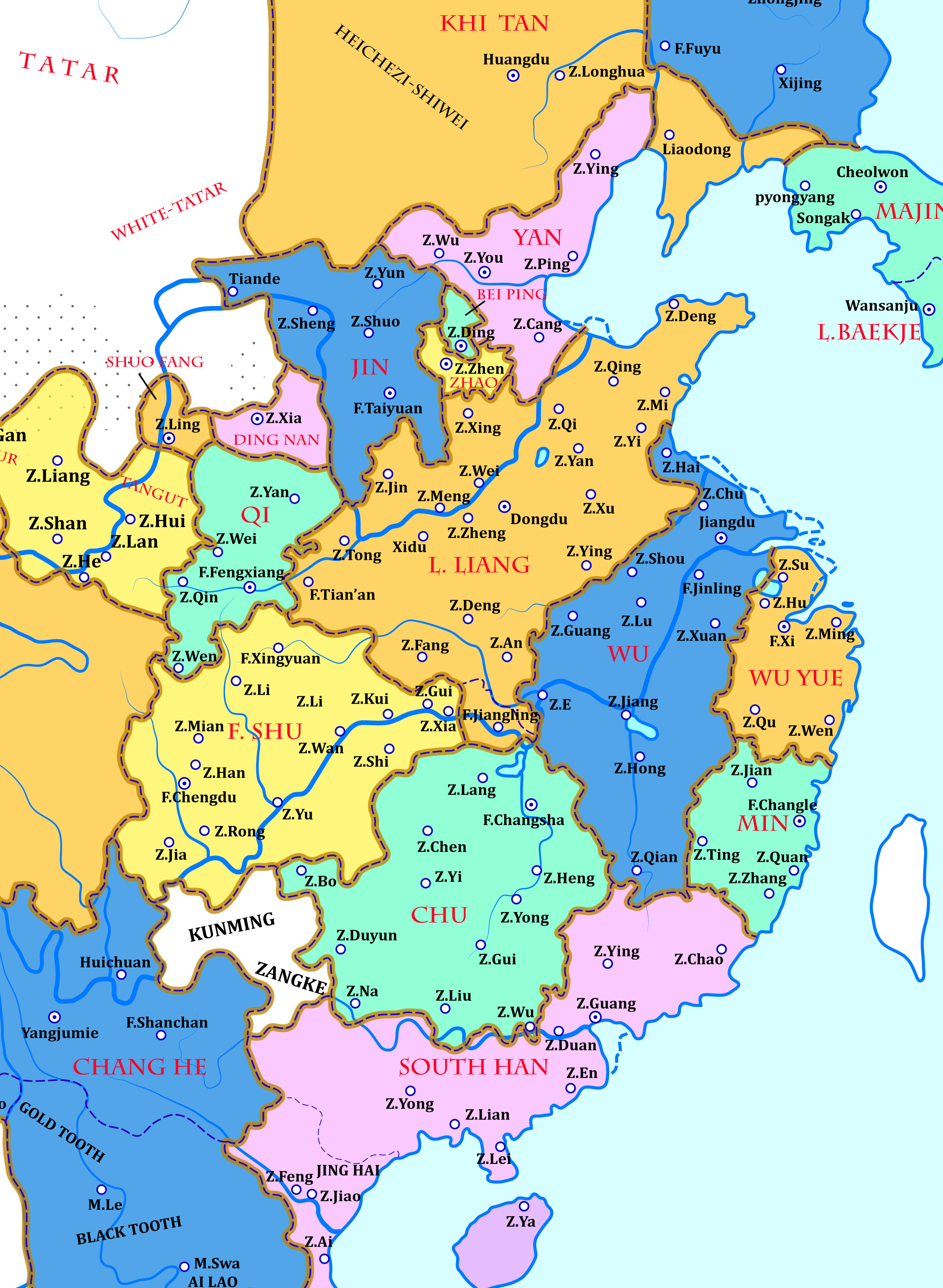
China in 908 AD

The military history of the Five Dynasties and Ten Kingdoms covers the period of Chinese history from the collapse of the Tang dynasty in 907 to the demise of Northern Han in 979. This period of Chinese history is noteworthy for the introduction of gunpowder weapons and as a transitional phase from the aristocratic imperial system to the Confucian bureaucracy which characterized the Song, Ming, and Qing dynasties.

== Five Dynasties ==
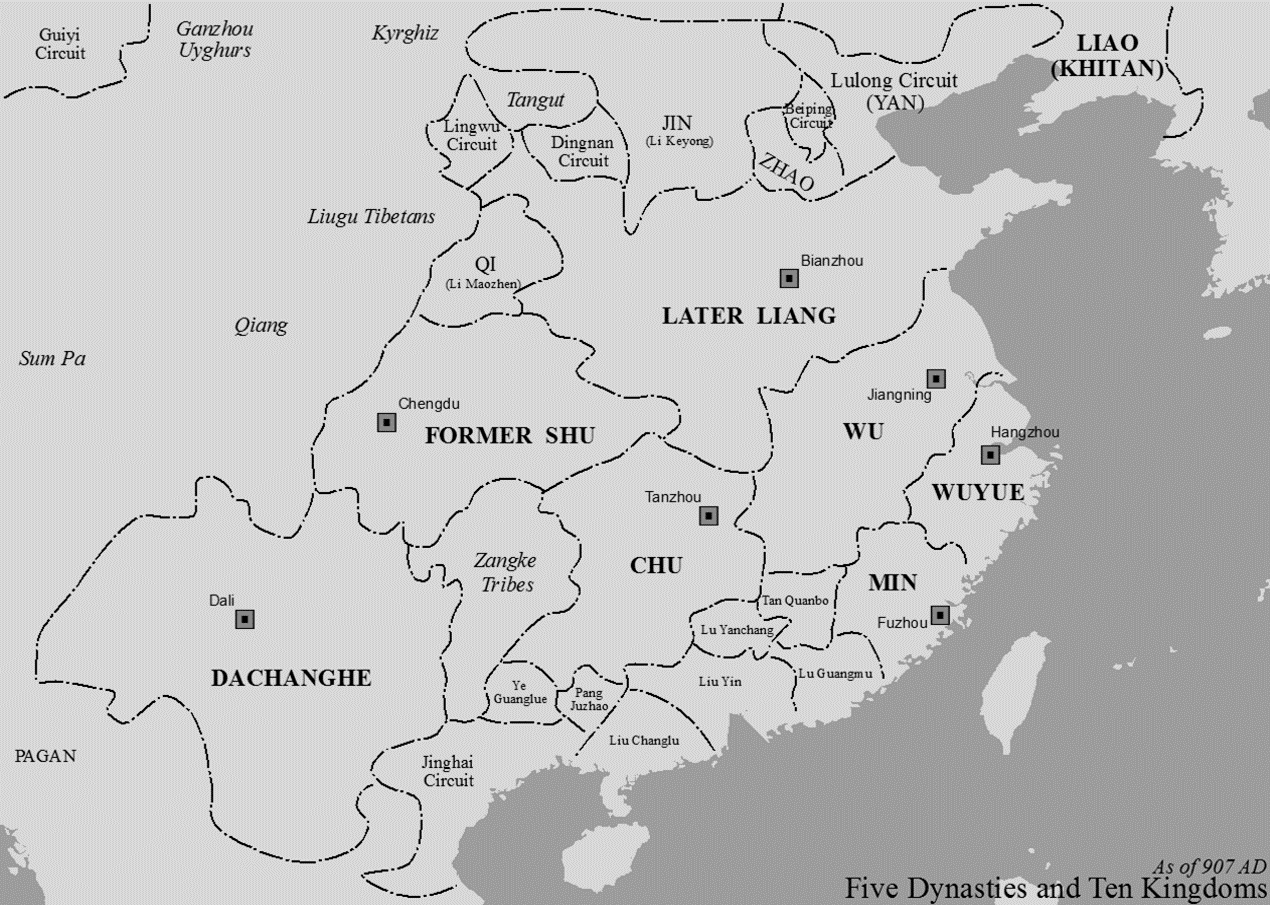
Later Liang in 907 AD

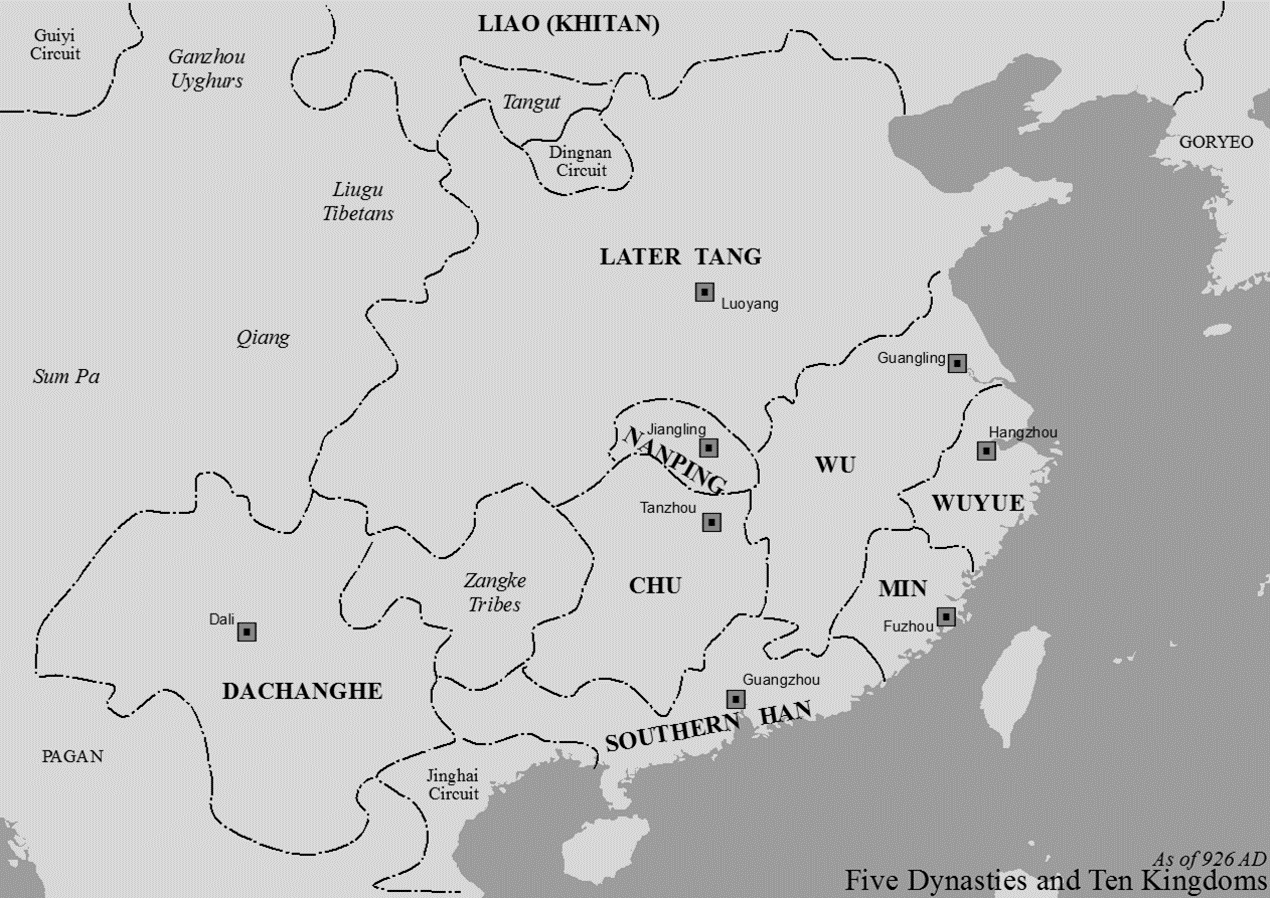
Later Tang in 926 AD

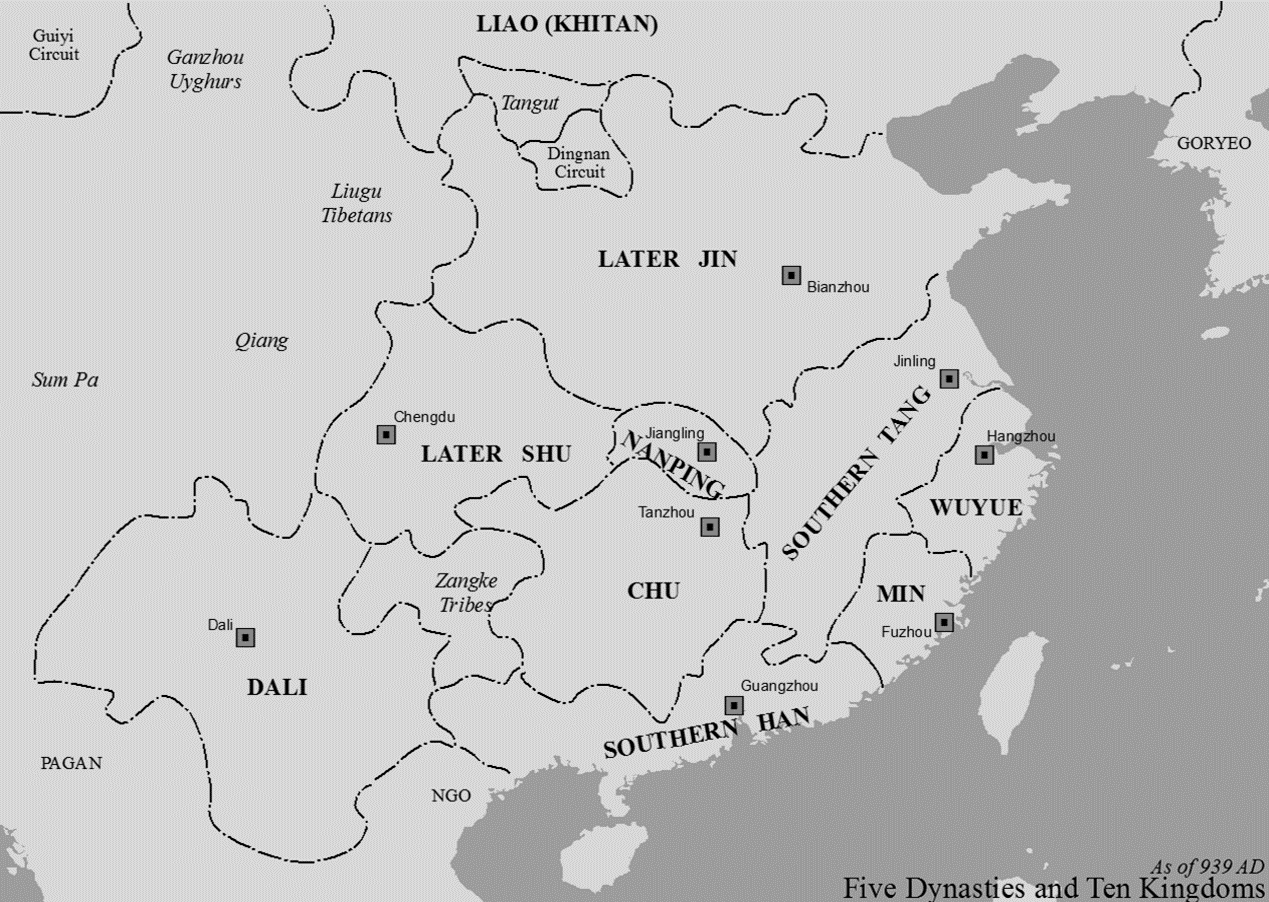
Later Jin in 939 AD

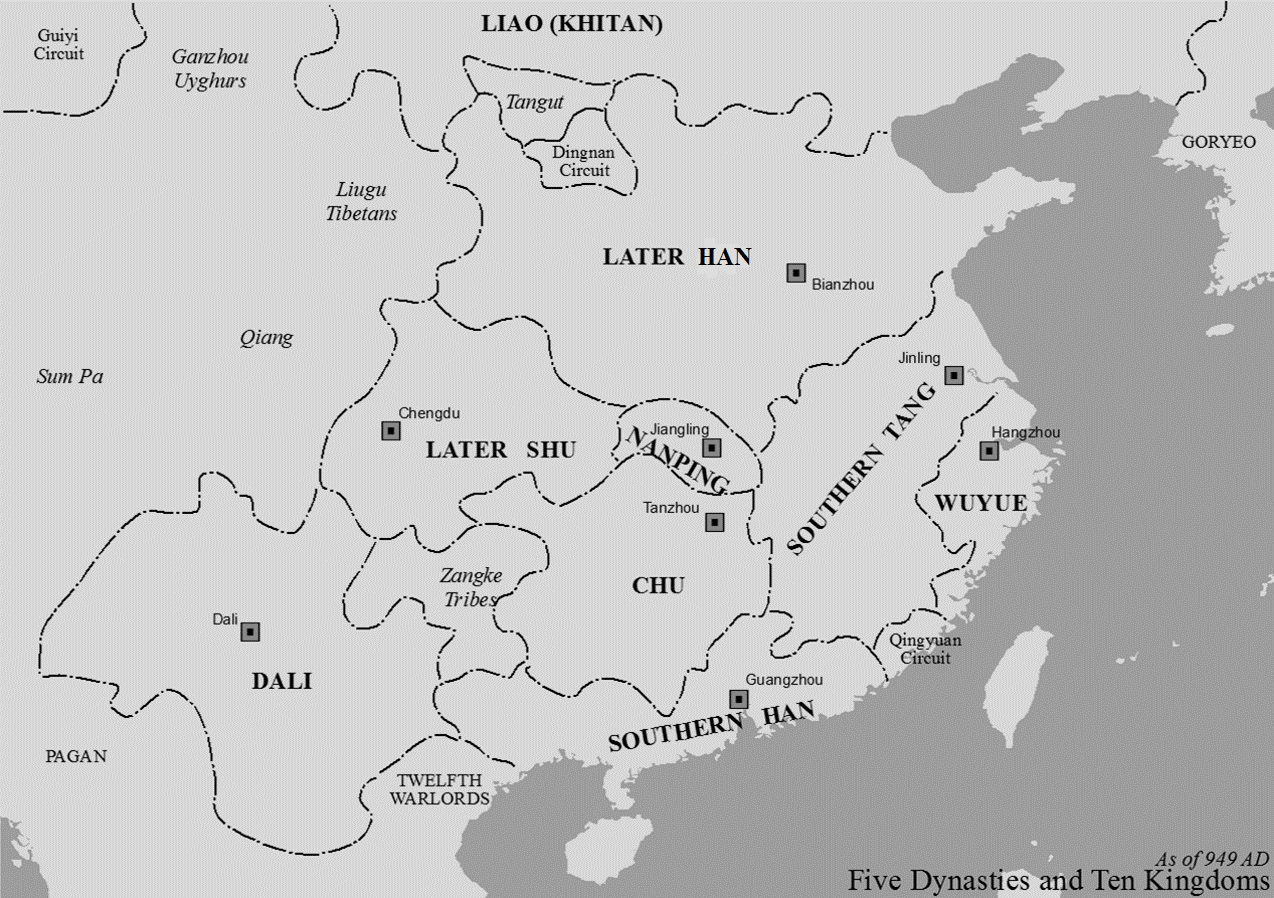
Later Han in 949 AD

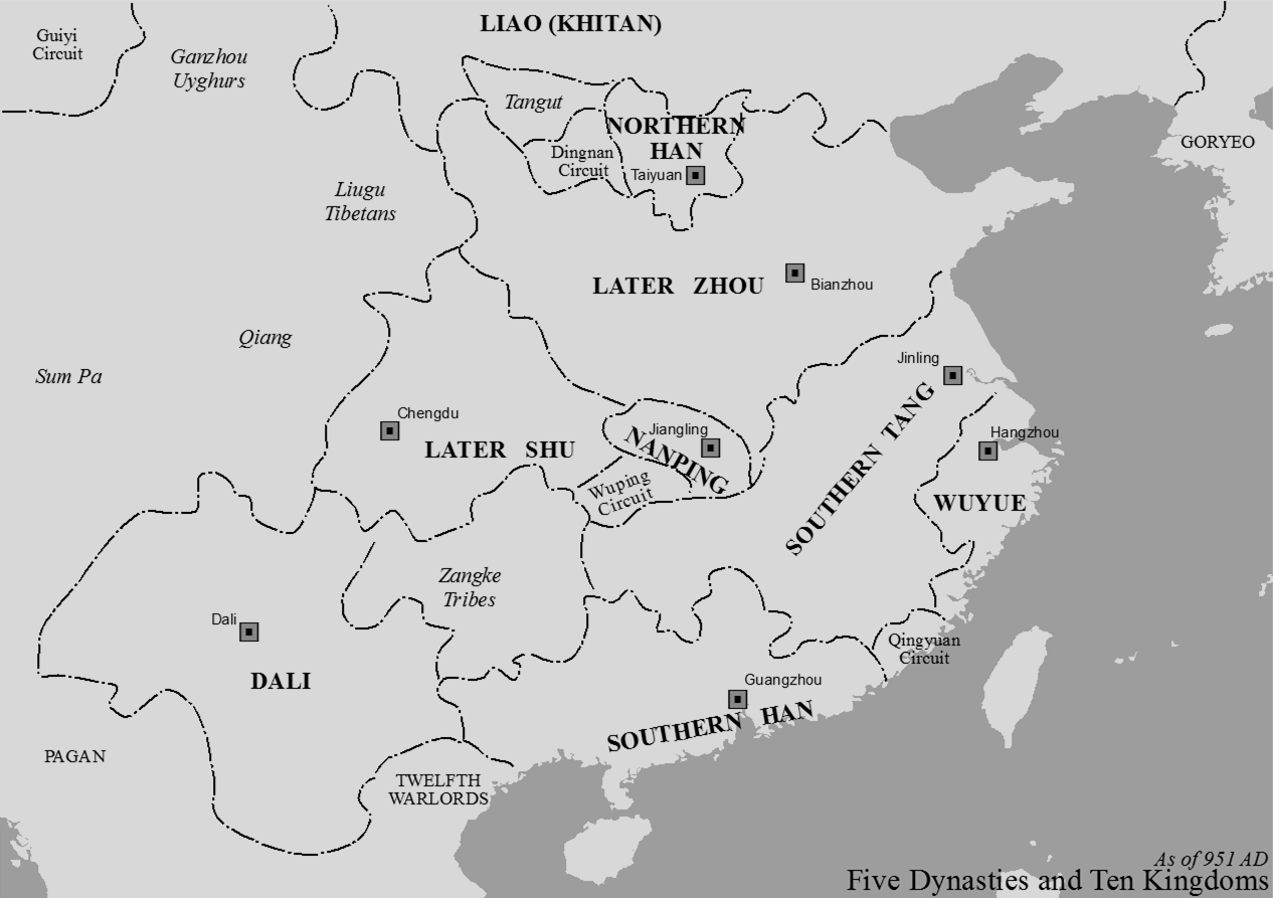
Later Zhou in 951 AD

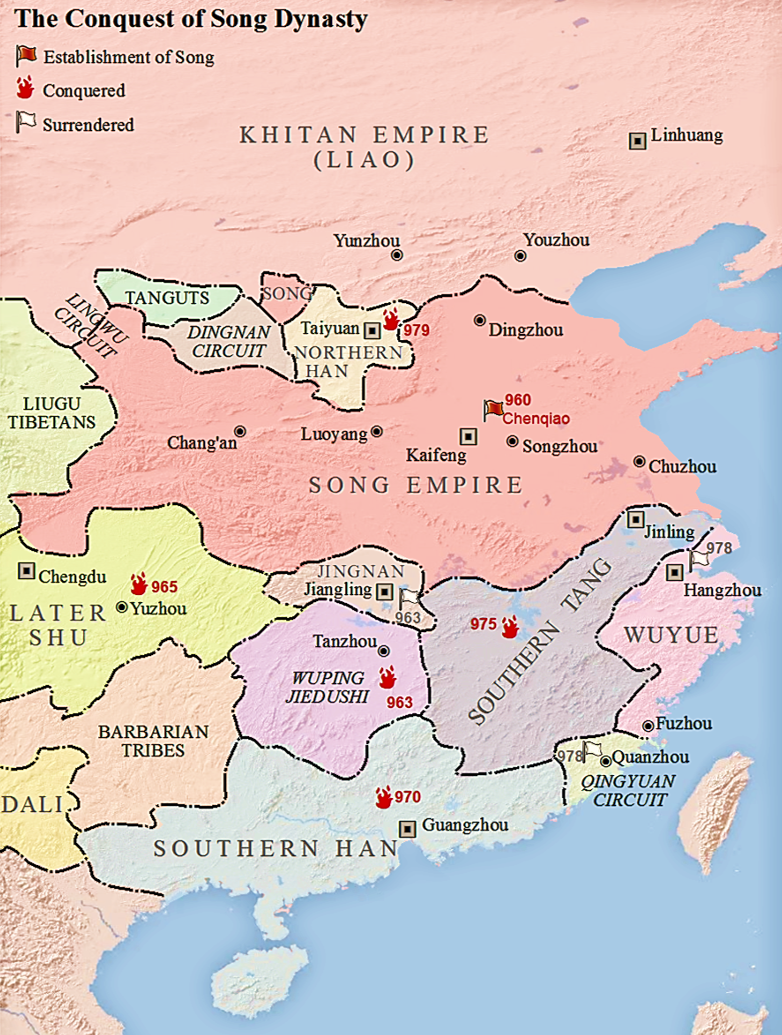
Song dynasty's conquest of China

=== Later Liang (907–923) ===
The Later Liang dynasty was founded by Zhu Wen. Zhu Wen was originally a rebel during the Huang Chao rebellion but later surrendered to the Tang dynasty and served under the military commander Li Keyong. In 904, Zhu Wen kidnapped Emperor Zhaozong of Tang, took him to Luoyang, and killed him. Three years later he also disposed of Emperor Ai of Tang, ending the Tang dynasty, and proclaimed his own dynasty of Liang. Zhu Wen undertook several military campaigns and failed in all of them. Despite lowering taxes to win support of the common folk, he is remembered in history as a brutal and ruthless tyrant. Zhu Wen was killed by his own son in 912, who was in turn killed by his brother a year later. The last ruler of Later Liang, Zhu Youzhen, ruled until 923 when Li Keyong's son Li Cunxu conquered the Liang capital Kaifeng.

=== Jin/Later Tang (883–936) ===
The Later Tang was originally Jin under Li Keyong, a Tang military commander of Shatuo descent. When Li Keyong died in 908, his son Li Cunxu picked up where his father left off, conquering Yan in 913 and eventually also Later Liang in 923, at which point he proclaimed the new Tang dynasty. The state of Qi submitted to Later Tang in 923. In 925, Later Tang conquered Former Shu. Li Cunxu was killed in the next year during a rebellion by one of his officers, and his adopted son Li Siyuan succeeded him. In 936, Li Cunxu's son-in-law, Shi Jingtang, rebelled with the aid of the Khitans and overthrew Later Tang, forming his own Later Jin dynasty.

=== Later Jin (937–947) ===
In return for their aid in toppling the Later Tang dynasty, Shi Jingtang turned over Sixteen Prefectures to the Khitans. After Shi Jingtang died in 942, Jing Yanguang took over government affairs for the young emperor Shi Chonggui. Jing Yanguang offended the Khitans, who invaded Later Jin in 945. The Jin General Fu Yanqing went out to meet them. The Khitans set fire to the land with blowing towards the Jin in order to force them into combat, but the Jin under Fu Yanqing had already advanced on the Khitan position and pinned them with infantry. A contingent of Shatuo cavalry attacked the Khitans in the flank and routed them. In 947 the Khitans invaded again and sacked Kaifeng, ending the dynasty. However the Khitan army met heavy opposition from the locals, forcing them to forage for food. Seeing that the conditions did not favor outright conquest, the Khitans retreated north, proclaiming their own Liao dynasty. The power vacuum left in their wake was filled by Liu Zhiyuan, who proclaimed himself Emperor of Han.

=== Later Han (947–951) ===
The Later Han dynasty was founded by Liu Zhiyuan in 947. He died the following year and his son Liu Chengyou was overthrown by Guo Wei in 951.

=== Later Zhou (951–960) ===
Guo Wei founded Later Zhou in 951. Guo Wei spent his short lived reign implementing reforms to lessen the burdens of the common folk. He also launched campaigns against Northern Han twice, in 952 and 954, but was thwarted both times by the Liao dynasty. He died in 954. His successor and adopted son, Chai Rong, launched a campaign against Buddhism. In 955, Later Zhou invaded Southern Tang and forced it to cede 14 prefectures as well as forced the aggressive Later Shu in the west to back off. Chai Rong attempted to invade the Liao dynasty in 959, but fell ill and died on campaign. His son Guo Zongxun was usurped by Zhao Kuangyin (Emperor Taizu of Song) in 960, thus ending the Five Dynasties.

== Ten Kingdoms ==
=== Former Shu (907–925) ===
Wang Jian was a regional inspector of Bizhou. In 891 he occupied Chengdu. By 902, he had conquered region of Hanzhong. In 907, Wang declared himself emperor of Shu (Former Shu) and began expanding the territory of his dominion in the north. Wang Jian's son and successor, Wang Yan (r. 918–925), squandered his father's achievements and spent enormous resources on building palaces while the heir apparent, Wang Yuanying, was killed in a fight. In 925, Wang Yan was captured by Later Tang and killed. His territory was left in the care of jiedushi Meng Zhixiang, who went on to found Later Shu.

=== Later Shu (934–965) ===
The former territory of Former Shu was overseen by jiedushi Meng Zhixiang, who asserted his independence in 932 by killing the jiedushi of Dongchuan, Dong Zhang, thereby conquering all of Sichuan. He declared himself emperor in 934 and died immediately afterwards. When the Khitans destroyed the Later Jin in 946, Later Shu occupied three prefectures to the north. Meng Zhixiang's successor, Meng Chang, also expanded to the northwest but lost all his gains to Later Zhou in 955. In 965, Meng Chang surrendered to the Song dynasty.

=== Yang Wu (907–937) ===
Yang Xingmi, born in 852, was a man of common origin. As a regional inspector of Luzhou, Yang displayed military talent during several campaigns against various warlords such as Gao Pian, Qin Yan, Bi Shiduo, and Sun Ru. In 892, Yang was promoted to jiedushi of Huainan. He engaged in several campaigns with Later Liang in the north and Wuyue in the southeast, expanding his territory considerably. He is also one of the first people recorded to have (possibly) used gunpowder in warfare. In 902, Yang became Pring of Wu, and died three years later.

His son and successor, Yang Wo, was controlled by the generals Zhang Hao and Xu Wen, who murdered him in 908. Xu Wen then killed Zhang Hao and became de facto ruler, enthroning Yang Longyan in 919. Xu Wen's foster son, Xu Zhigao, deposed Yang Longyan's successor, Yang Pu, in 937 and founded the state of Southern Tang (937–976), originally Great Qi.

=== Southern Tang (937–976) ===
When Xu Zhigao deposed Yang Pu in 937, he originally declared his state that of the Great Qi. A year later he renamed it Tang (Southern Tang). Xu also renamed himself to Li Bian. Li Bian's rule was characterized by peaceful diplomacy, favoring trade rather than war. Li instituted the Taixue and carried out state examinations to select competent officials. His son, Li Jing (r. 943–960), invaded Min in 945 and annexed its western territories while Wuyue took the northern parts, and Liu Congxiao was appointed jiedushi of the remaining territory. In 951, Southern Tang invaded Ma Chu and annexed the majority of its territory, with remnants surviving under the Wuping Jiedushi. In 955, Later Zhou invaded Southern Tang and forced it to cede 14 prefectures. Li Jing's son, Li Yu (r. 961–975), was uninterested in politics and spent his time writing poetry, practicing calligraphy, and playing musical instruments. In 976, the Song dynasty annexed Southern Tang.

=== Wuyue (907–978) ===
In 893, Qian Liu became jiedushi of Haijun. As jiedushi, Qian Liu defeated Dong Chang, the surveillance commissioner of Yuèzhōu, who planned on declaring himself emperor. For his victory, Qian was awarded the posts of jiedushi of Zhenhai and Donghai as well. In 907, Qian Liu proclaimed himself Prince of Wuyue and moved his capital to Hangzhou. Wuyue was a militarily weak state that thrived on producing silk, paper, and porcelain. They accepted the suzerainty of Later Liang and its successors. In 940, Wuyue invaded Min but was defeated. In 946, Wuyue succeeded in invading Min and conquered its capital of Fuzhou. In 978, the last ruler of Wuyue, Qian Chu, surrendered to the Song dynasty.

=== Min (909–945) ===
Min was founded by the rebels Wang Chao and Wang Shenzhi, who conquered Quanzhou in 886 and Fuzhou in 893. In 909, Wang Shenzhi became Prince of Min. Situated in a political and economic backwater, the rulers of Min tried to attract scholars to build an effective administration, but fell into familial bickering and ended up being destroyed by the Southern Tang in 945. The jiedushi of Qingyuan (Quanzhou) however continued to rule independently until the area was conquered by the Song dynasty in 978.

=== Southern Han (917–971) ===
Southern Han was founded by the brothers Liu Yin and Liu Yan. Liu Yin's father, Liu Qian, was the regional inspector of Fengzhou. When he died, Liu Yin succeeded his post, and was made jiedushi of Qinghai in 905. When the Tang dynasty collapsed in 907, the Liu brothers took in refugees from the north and used them to establish an independent realm. Liu Yin died in 911 and his brother succeeded him. Liu Yan proclaimed the Great Yue in 917, but then changed the name to Han a year later. Southern Han invaded Annan in 930 and removed the Khúc clan from power. The Southern Han general Liang Kezhen raided Champa's capital, Indrapura, but the Southern Han themselves were defeated by Dương Đình Nghệ a year later. In 937, Kiều Công Tiễn killed Dương Đình Nghệ and called Southern Han into a war against rebels to the south, however Đình Nghệ's son-in-law Ngô Quyền murdered Công Tiễn and defeated the Southern Han fleet at the Battle of Bạch Đằng in 938. In 948, Southern Han invaded Ma Chu, taking 10 prefectures. During the reign of Liu Chang (958–971), the court was dominated by eunuchs, and the state fell into decline. The Southern Han army kept a permanent corps of war elephants. When the Song dynasty invaded in 970, their crossbowmen readily routed the Southern Han elephants. This was the last time elephants were used in Chinese warfare. In 971, Liu Chang surrendered to the Song dynasty. The state of Southern Han was characterized by a civilian government that organized state examinations to recruit officials, but it also taxed its common folks harshly to build palace complexes such as the Zhaoyang Hall with its golden roof.

=== Jingnan (924–963) ===
Gao Jixing was a servant under the army of Zhu Wen. When he was made jiedushi of Jingnan, he began plotting to claim his independence. When Later Liang was destroyed by Later Tang in 923, Gao was made Prince of Nanping, where he increased his territory by a modest amount. The state of Jingnan was small and weak, paying obeisance to stronger states north and south. Gao Jixing's successor, Gao Conghui, was known as "Gao the Unreliable" for sending tribute missions to various realms both north and south. Jingnan was conquered by the Song dynasty in 963.

=== Ma Chu (926–951) ===
Ma Chu was founded by an officer by the name of Ma Yin who served under the generals Sun Ru and Liu Jianfeng. When Liu Jianfeng died in 896, the Tang court made Ma Yin the jiedushi of Hunan. After the collapse of the Tang in 907, Ma Yin was made Prince of Chu, a vassal of the northern dynasties. Under the reign of Ma Yin, Chu remained at peace with neighboring powers and traded tea. Ma Chu was conquered by the Southern Tang in 951.

=== Northern Han (948–979) ===
Northern Han was founded by Liu Chong, a Shatuo Turk, the jiedushi of Hedong Circuit and Taiyuan. In 951, Guo Wei rebelled and defeated Emperor Yin of Later Han. He then killed Liu Chong's son, Liu Yun, and proclaimed the Later Zhou, leaving Liu Chong as emperor of Northern Han. Northern Han forged an alliance with the Khitan Liao dynasty and participated in an invasion of Later Zhou, but was defeated and besieged by Zhou forces at Taiyuan for more than a month. In 979, the Song dynasty annexed Northern Han.

== Other states ==
Liu Shouguang's Yan was conquered by Later Tang in 913.

Li Maozhen's Qi submitted to Later Tang in 923.

== Gunpowder weapons ==
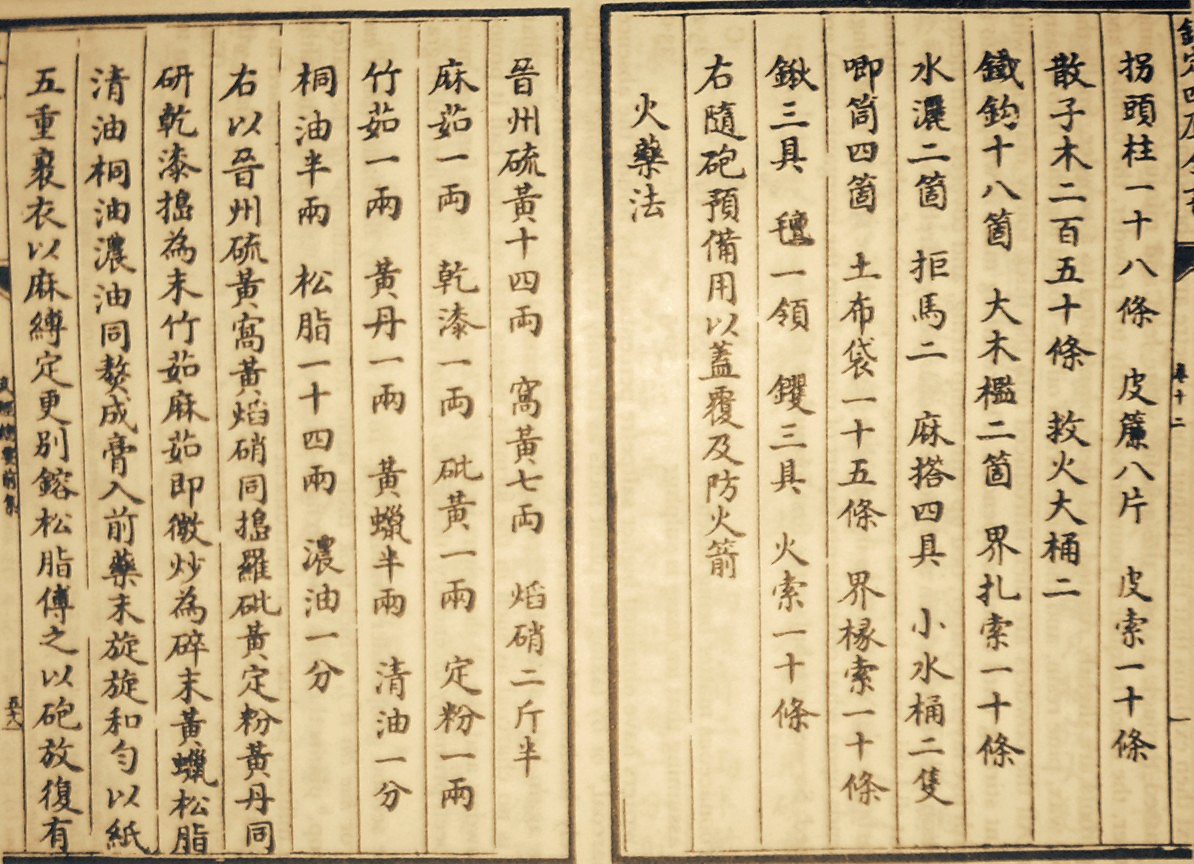
Earliest known written formula for gunpowder, from the Wujing Zongyao of 1044 AD.

=== Origins ===
Gunpowder was discovered in China sometime during the first millennium AD. The very earliest possible reference to gunpowder appeared in 142 AD during the Eastern Han dynasty when the alchemist Wei Boyang wrote about a substance with the properties of gunpowder. He described a mixture of three powders that would "fly and dance" violently in his Cantong qi, otherwise known as the Book of the Kinship of Three, a Taoist text on the subject of alchemy. Although it is impossible to know if he was actually referring to gunpowder, no other explosive known to scientists is composed of three powders. While it was almost certainly not their intention to create a weapon of war, Taoist alchemists continued to play a major role in gunpowder development due to their experiments with sulfur and saltpeter involved in searching for eternal life and ways to transmute one material into another. Historian Peter Lorge notes that despite the early association of gunpowder with Taoism, this may be a quirk of historiography and a result of the better preservation of texts associated with Taoism, rather than being a subject limited to only Taoists. The Taoist quest for the elixir of life attracted many powerful patrons, one of whom was Emperor Wu of Han. One of the resulting alchemical experiments involved heating 10% sulfur and 75% saltpeter to transform them.

The next reference to gunpowder occurred in the year 300 during the Jin dynasty (266–420). A Taoist philosopher by the name of Ge Hong wrote down the ingredients of gunpowder in his surviving works, collectively known as the Baopuzi ("The Master Who Embraces Simplicity"). The "Inner Chapters" on Taoism contains records of his experiments with heated saltpeter, pine resin, and charcoal among other carbon materials, resulting in explosion, which most historians acknowledge as an early form of gunpowder. In 492, Taoist alchemists noted that saltpeter, one of the most important ingredients in gunpowder, burns with a purple flame, allowing for practical efforts at purifying the substance.

The first confirmed reference to what can be considered gunpowder in China occurred during the Tang dynasty, first in a formula contained in the Taishang Shengzu Jindan Mijue (太上聖祖金丹秘訣) in 808, and then about 50 years later in a Taoist text known as the Zhenyuan miaodao yaolüe (真元妙道要略). The first formula was a combination of six parts sulfur to six parts saltpeter to one part birthwort herb. The Taoist text warned against an assortment of dangerous formulas, one of which corresponds with gunpowder: "Some have heated together sulfur, realgar (arsenic disulphide), and saltpeter with honey; smoke [and flames] result, so that their hands and faces have been burnt, and even the whole house burned down." Alchemists called this discovery fire medicine ("huoyao" 火藥), and the term has continued to refer to gunpowder in China into the present day, a reminder of its heritage as a side result in the search for longevity increasing drugs.

=== Fire arrow ===
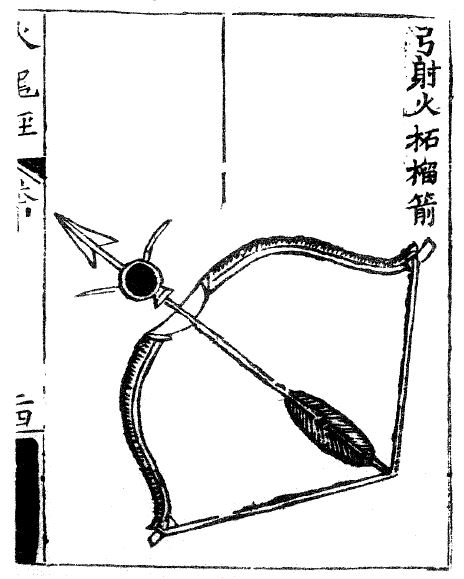
An arrow strapped with gunpowder ready to be shot from a bow. From the Huolongjing

At this point the formula contained too little saltpeter (about 50%) to be explosive, but the mixture was highly flammable, and contemporary weapons reflected this in their deployment as mainly shock and incendiary weapons. One of the first, if not the first of these weapons was the fire arrow. The first possible reference to the use of fire arrows was by the Yang Wu in 904 during the siege of Yuzhang. An officer under Yang Xingmi by the name of Zheng Fan (鄭璠) ordered his troops to "shoot off a machine to let fire and burn the Longsha Gate," after which he and his troops dashed over the fire into the city and captured it, and he was promoted to Prime Minister Inspectorate for his efforts and the burns his body endured. A later account of this event in the Hu Qian Jing (Tiger Seal Manual) written from 977 to 1004 corroborated with the report and explained that "by let fire (飛火) is meant things like firebombs and fire arrows." Arrows carrying gunpowder were possibly the most applicable form of gunpowder weaponry at the time. Early gunpowder may have only produced an effective flame when exposed to oxygen, thus the rush of air around the arrow in flight would have provided a suitable catalyst for the reaction.

The first fire arrows were arrows strapped with gunpowder incendiaries, but in 969 two Song generals, Yue Yifang and Feng Jisheng (馮繼升), invented a variant fire arrow which utilized gunpowder tubes as propellants. Afterwards fire arrows started transitioning to rocket propelled weapons rather than being fired from a bow. These fire arrows were shown to the emperor in 970 when the head of a weapons manufacturing bureau sent Feng Jisheng to demonstrate the gunpowder arrow design, for which he was heavily rewarded.

In 975, the state of Wuyue sent to the Song dynasty a unit of soldiers skilled in the handling of fire arrows. In the same year, the Song dynasty used fire arrows and incendiary bombs to destroy the fleet of Southern Tang.

=== Flamethrower ===
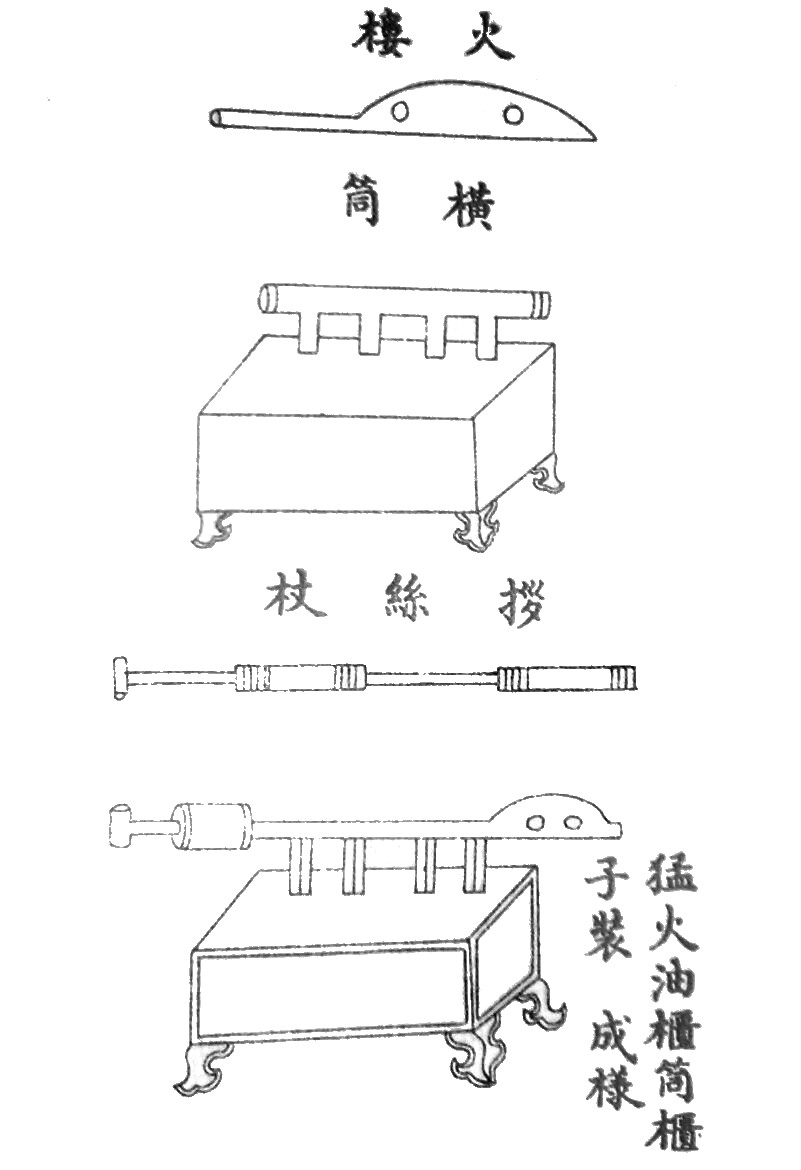
A Chinese flamethrower from the Wujing Zongyao manuscript of 1044 AD, Song Dynasty. The text reads from top to bottom: ignition chamber, horizontal tank, piston rod, and fierce-fire oil tank cabinet installed form.

According to Joseph Needham, the Chinese flamethrower which appeared during this era also used gunpowder as an igniter and was the first appearance of the slow match.

The Chinese flamethrower, also known as "the Fierce-fire Oil Cabinet" (Chinese: 猛火油櫃 měng huǒ yóu guì), used a double-piston pump to shoot naphtha. It was first recorded to have been used in China in 919. Wu Renchen's Spring and Autumn Annals of the Ten Kingdoms states that in 917 AD, the king of Wuyue sent fierce fire oil to the Khitans as a gift. The envoy explained that it could be used to attack cities and the Khitan ruler was delighted.

The History of Liao gives an extended version of the account:

The ruler of Wu State (Li Bian) sent to Abaoji, ruler of the Qidan (Liao), a quantity of furious fiery oil (meng huoyou) which on being set alight and coming in contact with water blazed all the more fiercely. It could be used in attacking cities. Tai Zu (Abaoji) was delighted, and at once got ready a cavalry force thirty thousand strong with the intention of attacking Youzhou. But his queen, Shulü laughed and said: 'Whoever heard of attacking a country with oil? Would it not be better to take three thousand horse and lie in wait on the borders, laying waste the country, so that the city will be starved out? By that means they will be brought to straits infallibly, even though it takes a few years. So why all this haste? Take care lest you be worsted, so that the Chinese mock at us, and our own people fall away.' Therefore he went no further in his design.

— History of Liao

According to Lin Yu's Wu-Yue Beishi (吳越備史, "The History of Wu and Yue"), the next appearance of fierce fire oil occurred in 919 AD when the two fleets of Wuyue and Wu met in battle. In the Battle of Langshan Jiang (Wolf Mountain River), the Wuyue fleet under Qian Chuanguan brought with them more than 500 dragon-like battleships and used "fire oil" to burn the enemy fleet. It was a great victory and they destroyed more than 400 enemy ships as well as capturing more than 7,000 men. Lin Yu goes on to explain appearance of the new weapon and the device used to deploy it:

What is 'fire oil'? It comes from Arabia (Dashi Guo) in the southern seas. It is spouted forth from iron tubes. and when meeting with water or wet things it gives forth flame and smoke even more abundantly. Wusu Wang used to decorate the mouths of the tubes with silver, so that if (the tank and tube) fell into the hands of the enemy, they would scrape off the silver and reject the rest of the apparatus. So the fire oil itself would not get into their hands (and could be recovered later).

— The History of Wu and Yue

Flamethrowers were also recorded to have been used in 976 AD when Song naval forces confronted the Southern Tang fleet on the Changjiang. Southern Tang forces attempted to use flamethrowers against the Song navy, but were accidentally consumed by their own fire when violent winds swept in their direction.

=== Fire lance ===
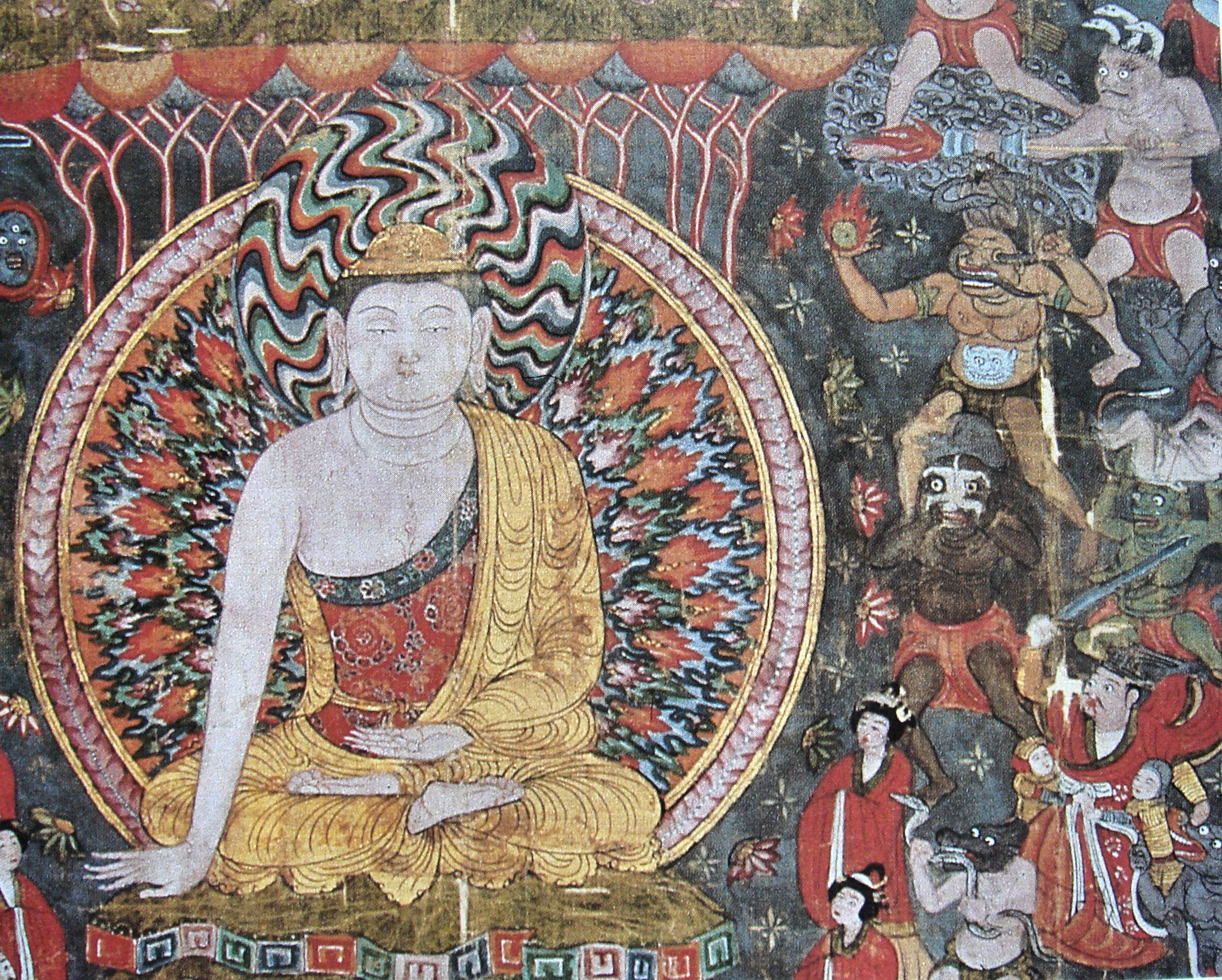
First illustration of Fire Lance and a Grenade, 10th Century, Dunhuang. Appears to be a detail from an illustration of Sakyamuni's temptation by Mara, with the demons at upper right threatening with the fire lance and other weapons while those at lower right tempt with pleasures.

The fire lance was first depicted in a silk banner painting dating to the mid-10th century. Although most Chinese scholars reject the appearance of the fire lance prior to the Jin-Song wars, a Song text from 1000 and the Wujing Zongyao do make brief mentions of the fire lance. The fire lance, as implied by the name, is essentially a long spear or pole affixed with a tube of gunpowder, and as it saw more usage, the tube's length became longer and pellets were added to the composition. The earliest confirmed employment of the fire lance in warfare was by Song dynasty forces against the Jin in 1132 during the siege of De'an (modern Anlu, Hubei Province).

== Bibliography ==
- Andrade, Tonio (2016), The Gunpowder Age: China, Military Innovation, and the Rise of the West in World History, Princeton University Press, ISBN 978-0-691-13597-7.
- Asimov, M.S. (1998), History of civilizations of Central Asia Volume IV The age of achievement: A.D. 750 to the end of the fifteenth century Part One The historical, social and economic setting, UNESCO Publishing
- Barfield, Thomas (1989), The Perilous Frontier: Nomadic Empires and China, Basil Blackwell
- Barrett, Timothy Hugh (2008), The Woman Who Discovered Printing, Great Britain: Yale University Press, ISBN 978-0-300-12728-7 (alk. paper)
- Beckwith, Christopher I (1987), The Tibetan Empire in Central Asia: A History of the Struggle for Great Power among Tibetans, Turks, Arabs, and Chinese during the Early Middle Ages, Princeton University Press
- Beckwith, Christopher I. (2009), Empires of the Silk Road: A History of Central Eurasia from the Bronze Age to the Present, Princeton University Press, ISBN 978-0-691-13589-2
- Biran, Michal (2005), The Empire of the Qara Khitai in Eurasian History: Between China and the Islamic World, Cambridge Studies in Islamic Civilization, Cambridge, England: Cambridge University Press, ISBN 0521842263
- Bregel, Yuri (2003), An Historical Atlas of Central Asia, Brill
- Chase, Kenneth Warren (2003), Firearms: A Global History to 1700, Cambridge University Press, ISBN 978-0-521-82274-9
- Chia, Lucille (2011), Knowledge and Text Production in an Age of Print: China, 900-1400, Brill
- Drompp, Michael Robert (2005), Tang China And The Collapse Of The Uighur Empire: A Documentary History, Brill
- Ebrey, Patricia Buckley (1999), The Cambridge Illustrated History of China, Cambridge: Cambridge University Press, ISBN 0-521-66991-X (paperback).
- Ebrey, Patricia Buckley; Walthall, Anne; Palais, James B. (2006), East Asia: A Cultural, Social, and Political History, Boston: Houghton Mifflin, ISBN 0-618-13384-4
- Golden, Peter B. (1992), An Introduction to the History of the Turkic Peoples: Ethnogenesis and State-Formation in Medieval and Early Modern Eurasia and the Middle East, OTTO HARRASSOWITZ · WIESBADEN
- Graff, David A. (2002), Medieval Chinese Warfare, 300-900, Warfare and History, London: Routledge, ISBN 0415239559
- Graff, David Andrew (2016), The Eurasian Way of War Military Practice in Seventh-Century China and Byzantium, Routledge, ISBN 978-0-415-46034-7.
- Haywood, John (1998), Historical Atlas of the Medieval World, AD 600-1492, Barnes & Noble
- Kelly, Jack (2004), Gunpowder: Alchemy, Bombards, & Pyrotechnics: The History of the Explosive that Changed the World, Basic Books, ISBN 0-465-03718-6.
- Knapp, Ronald G. (2008), Chinese Bridges: Living Architecture From China's Past. Singapore, Tuttle Publishing
- Kuhn, Dieter (2009), The Age of Confucian Rule, Harvard University Press
- Latourette, Kenneth Scott (1964), The Chinese, their history and culture, Volumes 1-2, Macmillan
- Liang, Jieming (2006), Chinese Siege Warfare: Mechanical Artillery & Siege Weapons of Antiquity, Singapore, Republic of Singapore: Leong Kit Meng, ISBN 981-05-5380-3
- Lorge, Peter (2005), War, Politics and Society in Early Modern China, 900–1795, Routledge, ISBN 978-0-203-96929-8
- Lorge, Peter A. (2008), The Asian Military Revolution: from Gunpowder to the Bomb, Cambridge University Press, ISBN 978-0-521-60954-8
- Lu, Gwei-Djen (1988), "The Oldest Representation of a Bombard", Technology and Culture, 29 (3): 594–605, doi:10.1353/tech.1988.0097
- Luttwak, Edward N. (2009), The Grand Strategy of the Byzantine Empire, The Belknap Press of Harvard University Press
- Millward, James (2009), Eurasian Crossroads: A History of Xinjiang, Columbia University Press
- Mote, F. W. (2003), Imperial China: 900–1800, Harvard University Press, ISBN 978-0674012127
- Needham, Joseph (1986a), Science and Civilization in China: Volume 3, Mathematics and the Sciences of the Heavens and the Earth, Taipei: Caves Books
- —— (1986g), Science and Civilization in China: Volume 4, Physics and Physical Engineering, Part 1, Physics, Taipei: Caves Books
- —— (1986b), Science and Civilization in China: Volume 4, Physics and Physical Engineering, Part 2, Mechanical Engineering, Taipei: Caves Books
- —— (1986c), Science and Civilization in China: Volume 4, Physics and Physical Technology, Part 3, Civil Engineering and Nautics, Taipei: Caves Books
- —— (1986d), Science and Civilization in China: Volume 5, Chemistry and Chemical Technology, Part 1, Paper and Printing, Taipei: Caves Books
- —— (1986e), Science and Civilization in China: Volume 5, Chemistry and Chemical Technology, Part 4, Spagyrical Discovery and Invention: Apparatus, Theories and Gifts, Taipei: Caves Books
- —— (1986h), Science and Civilization in China: Volume 6, Biology and Biological Technology, Part 1, Botany, Cambridge University Press
- —— (1986f), Science & Civilisation in China, vol. V:7: The Gunpowder Epic, Cambridge University Press, ISBN 0-521-30358-3
- Needham, Joseph (2008), Science & Civilisation in China Volume 5 Part 11, Cambridge University Press
- Pacey, Arnold (1991), Technology in World Civilization: A Thousand-year History, MIT Press
- Partington, J. R. (1960), A History of Greek Fire and Gunpowder, Cambridge, UK: W. Heffer & Sons.
- Partington, J. R. (1999), A History of Greek Fire and Gunpowder, Baltimore: Johns Hopkins University Press, ISBN 0-8018-5954-9
- Peers, C.J. (2006), Soldiers of the Dragon: Chinese Armies 1500 BC - AD 1840, Osprey Publishing Ltd
- Reilly, Kevin (2012), The Human Journey: A Concise Introduction to World History, Volume 1, Rowman & Littlefield
- Rong, Xinjiang (2013), Eighteen Lectures on Dunhuang, Brill
- Schafer, Edward H. (1985), The Golden Peaches of Samarkand: A study of T'ang Exotics, University of California Press
- Shaban, M. A. (1979), The ʿAbbāsid Revolution, Cambridge: Cambridge University Press, ISBN 0-521-29534-3
- Sima, Guang (2015), Bóyángbǎn Zīzhìtōngjiàn 54 huánghòu shīzōng 柏楊版資治通鑑54皇后失蹤, Yuǎnliú chūbǎnshìyè gǔfèn yǒuxiàn gōngsī, ISBN 978-957-32-0876-1
- Skaff, Jonathan Karam (2012), Sui-Tang China and Its Turko-Mongol Neighbors: Culture, Power, and Connections, 580-800 (Oxford Studies in Early Empires), Oxford University Press
- Standen, Naomi (2007), Unbounded Loyalty Frontier Crossings in Liao China, University of Hawai'i Press
- Taylor, K.W. (2013), A History of the Vietnamese, Cambridge University Press
- Twitchett, Denis C. (1979), The Cambridge History of China, Vol. 3, Sui and T'ang China, 589–906, Cambridge University Press
- Twitchett, Denis (1994), "The Liao", The Cambridge History of China, Volume 6, Alien Regime and Border States, 907-1368, Cambridge: Cambridge University Press, pp. 43–153, ISBN 0521243319
- Twitchett, Denis (2009), The Cambridge History of China Volume 5 The Sung dynasty and its Predecessors, 907-1279, Cambridge University Press
- Walker, Hugh Dyson (2012), East Asia: A New History, AuthorHouse
- Wang, Zhenping (2013), Tang China in Multi-Polar Asia: A History of Diplomacy and War, University of Hawaii Press
- Whiting, Marvin C. (2002), Imperial Chinese Military History, Writers Club Press
- Wilkinson, Endymion (2012), Chinese History: A New Manual, Harvard University Asia Center for the Harvard-Yenching Institute
- Wilkinson, Endymion (2015), Chinese History: A New Manual, 4th edition, Cambridge, MA: Harvard University Asia Center distributed by Harvard University Press, ISBN 9780674088467
- Xiong, Victor Cunrui (2000), Sui-Tang Chang'an: A Study in the Urban History of Late Medieval China (Michigan Monographs in Chinese Studies), U OF M CENTER FOR CHINESE STUDIES, ISBN 0892641371
- Xiong, Victor Cunrui (2009), Historical Dictionary of Medieval China, United States of America: Scarecrow Press, Inc., ISBN 978-0810860537
- Xu, Elina-Qian (2005), HISTORICAL DEVELOPMENT OF THE PRE-DYNASTIC KHITAN, Institute for Asian and African Studies 7
- Xue, Zongzheng (1992), Turkic peoples, 中国社会科学出版社
- Yuan, Shu (2001), Bóyángbǎn Tōngjiàn jìshìběnmò 28 dìèrcìhuànguánshídài 柏楊版通鑑記事本末28第二次宦官時代, Yuǎnliú chūbǎnshìyè gǔfèn yǒuxiàn gōngsī, ISBN 957-32-4273-7
- Yule, Henry (1915), Cathay and the Way Thither: Being a Collection of Medieval Notices of China, Vol I: Preliminary Essay on the Intercourse Between China and the Western Nations Previous to the Discovery of the Cape Route, Hakluyt Society
