= Qianyou =

Qianyou may refer to:

- Qianyou Subdistrict (乾佑街道), a subdistrict in Zhashui County, Shaanxi, China

== Historical eras ==
- Qianyou (乾祐, 948–951), era name used by Liu Chengyou, emperor of Later Han, later continued by the Northern Han emperors Liu Chong and Liu Chengjun until 956
- Qianyou (乾祐, 1170–1193), era name used by Emperor Renzong of Western Xia
