= Liu Chong's empress =

Liu Chong's empress (name unknown) was the wife of Liu Chong (Emperor Shizu of Northern Han), the first emperor of China's Northern Han dynasty.

Very little is known about her based on historical sources — not even her name. All that is known is of her existence and the fact that she was created empress by Emperor Shizong of Liao, to whom Liu Chong was a vassal, in 951, shortly after Liu Chong claimed imperial title. Liu Yun, the eldest son of Liu Chong, was born of her, as it is known that Liu Jiwen (劉繼文), son of Liu Yun, was her grandson. It is not known when she died.

Regnal titles
| Preceded by None (traditionally), claimed to be succeeding Empress Li of Later Han | Empress of Northern Han; 951–954 | Succeeded by Empress Guo |
| Preceded by None (traditionally), claimed to be succeeding Empress Li of Later Han | Empress of China (Central Shanxi); 951–954 | Succeeded by Empress Guo |
