= House of Liu (disambiguation) =

House of Liu was the ruling house of the Han dynasty (206 BC–9 AD, 25–220 AD).

House of Liu may also refer to:

- The ruling house of State of Liu (592 BC–?)
- The ruling house of Han (221–263)
- The ruling house of Former Zhao (304–329)
- The ruling house of Xia (407–431)
- The ruling house of Liu Song dynasty (420–479)
- The ruling house of Southern Han (917–971)
- The ruling house of Later Han (947–951)
- The ruling house of Northern Han (951–979)
