= Guo Chong =

Chinese general

Guo Chong (郭崇); Guo Chongwei (郭崇威)

Personal details
- Born: c. 908; Jincheng County, Former Jin
- Died: c. 965; Likely Hebei Circuit, Northern Song
- Children: Guo Shoulin (郭守璘); Guo Yungong (郭允恭)

Guo Chong
- Chinese: 郭崇
Transcriptions
Standard Mandarin
- Hanyu Pinyin: Guō Chóng

Guo Chongwei
- Chinese: 郭崇威
Transcriptions
Standard Mandarin
- Hanyu Pinyin: Guō Chóngwēi

Guo Chong (c. 908 – c. 965), known as Guo Chongwei before 951, was a military general and officer who successively served the Later Tang, Later Jin, Later Han, Later Zhou and Northern Song dynasties. He was likely an ethnic Shatuo.

Emperor Renzong of Song's first wife, Empress Guo, was his granddaughter.

== Early life ==
Guo Chongwei was from Ying Prefecture, where his father and grandfather had both been tribal chieftains. Around age 20, Guo Chongwei enlisted in the Later Tang army.

In 936, Shi Jingtang founded the Later Jin after overthrowing the Later Tang. In return for military support he received, he yielded the Sixteen Prefectures, including Ying Prefecture, to the northern Khitan state. Unwilling to serve the Khitans, Guo—who was the commander-in-chief of the Ying Prefecture cavalry—left his hometown and moved south to Later Jin territory in 937. In the ensuing years, he successively served as the cavalry commander-in-chief of three prefectures, Yun Prefecture, Hezhong Prefecture, and Lu Prefecture. In the mid-940s, Guo was stationed in Taiyuan Prefecture.

== During Later Han ==
In January 947, the Khitans (Liao dynasty) destroyed the Later Jin, but their rule in the conquered territory proved short-lived. In March 947, Liu Zhiyuan, the military governor of Hedong Circuit based in Taiyuan, declared himself emperor. The Later Han army moved south to the Chinese heartland, and Guo Chongwei was one of the vanguard generals. In January 948, Guo was part of the army that escorted Liu Zhiyuan into Daliang. He was subsequently appointed prefect of Ying Prefecture, and later prefect of Fu Prefecture.

In 949, Guo Chongwei followed general Guo Wei to quash Li Shouzhen's rebellion in Hezhong Prefecture. He received honorary titles for his military merits. Afterwards, Guo Wei became the military commissioner of Tianxiong Prefecture, and Guo Chongwei followed him to Ye, where he was made the chief military inspector-commissioner of Tianxiong Prefecture, in charge of the Mobile Brigade Cavalry.

In December 950, Guo Chongwei received a secret imperial order from the Later Han emperor Liu Chengyou, instructing him and others to murder Guo Wei and Wang Jun. This edict arrived just as Guo Wei and Wang Jun's families were all massacred in the capital, along with other ministers victimized by Liu Chengyou's purge. Informed by the plot, Guo Wei calmly summoned Guo Chongwei and others to follow the emperor's wish and kill him. Greatly moved, Guo Chongwei replied:

"The emperor is young and this decision is obviously made by petty courtiers close to him. If we grant the wishes of those people, how could there be peace in this country!"

He and others urged Guo Wei to go to the capital to "weed out the rats and cleanse the imperial court". Guo Wei agreed and asked Guo Chongwei to head off with the cavalry as the vanguard unit, while his main army followed. On December 31, 950, Guo Wei's forces met the loyalist army, commanded by Murong Yanchao, right outside of Daliang. The next day, Guo Chongwei and the cavalry thoroughly routed Murong Yanchao's cavalry, and Liu Chengyou was killed the next night in his panicky flight. After entering the capital, Guo Chongwei and Wang Yin advised Guo Wei to take immediate measures to stop soldiers from looting and pillaging. On January 4, 951, Guo Wei decided that Liu Chengyou's cousin Liu Yun should arrive in Daliang to be the next emperor, so he sent out Feng Dao and others to Xu Prefecture to escort Liu Yun back to the capital. However, history quickly unfolded in a different direction.

On January 9, 951, the imperial court received reports that the Khitans had attacked and taken a few northern border towns. Empress Dowager Li, the nominal regent, sent Guo Wei to take his army north to resist the Khitan invasion. Guo Wei's army reached Chan Prefecture on January 29. The next morning, thousands of his soldiers—fearful that they would be punished for having sacked the capital if another Liu became emperor—made a commotion, supporting Guo Wei as emperor. Guo Wei accepted, and the army turned back to Daliang.

Once news of the mutiny reached Daliang, Wang Jun and Wang Yin immediately sent Guo Chongwei—who had been put in charge of the Metropolitan Cavalry Command—eastbound with 700 cavalries to intercept Liu Yun's entourage. Guo Chongwei quickly arrived outside Song Prefecture, where Liu Yun was resting. Frightened, Liu Yun climbed the city walls and asked Guo Chongwei why he arrived. Guo Chongwei assured Liu that he was only sent to protect him. Liu Yun asked him to enter the city, but Guo Chongwei did not dare. Only after Feng Dao exited and spoke with him did he enter, where he met with a teary-eyed Liu Yun who nervously gripped his hands. Guo Chongwei reassured him that Guo Wei only had good intentions. After Guo Chongwei exited the city, Dong Yi (董裔), a loyal adviser, immediately said to Liu Yun:

"Notice how Chongwei looked and behaved! This must be a conspiracy. Everybody on the street is saying that Guo Wei has already declared himself emperor, if your majesty does not act soon, it will be a disaster!"

Dong Yi asked Liu Yun to quickly summon Zhang Lingchao (張令超), the commander of the army sent to protect him, and persuade him to attack Guo Chongwei's cavalry at night. But Liu Yun was too hesitant to do anything. Meanwhile, Guo Chongwei was secretly communicating with Zhang Lingchao, and succeeded in persuading Zhang to turn over his soldiers. Once he took control of the situation, Guo Chongwei summoned Feng Dao back to the capital, killed Dong Yi and other advisers loyal to Liu Yun while putting Liu Yun under house arrest. (Liu Yun was later killed.)

== During Later Zhou ==
After Guo Wei established the Later Zhou, Guo Chongwei changed his name to Guo Chong to observe naming taboo.

== During the Song dynasty ==
In 960, general Zhao Kuangyin usurped the imperial power from the 5-year-old Guo Zongxun to found the Song dynasty. Guo Chong was appointed secretariat director (中書令). It was said that Guo Chong cried several times over the sad fate of the Later Zhou imperial house. Army-supervising commissioner Chen Sihui (陳思誨) then sent a secret memorial to Zhao Kuangyin, reporting Guo Chong's outbursts and warning Zhao Kuangyin against a possible Guo Chong rebellion, as Changshan was close to the Song–Liao border. Zhao Kuangyin knew Guo Chong well and completely understood his affection for the diseased Later Zhou emperors, still, he sent someone to watch Guo Chong's activities. The messenger returned to report that Guo Chong spent his days drinking and playing chess with his retinues in a pavilion by the pond, and his domain was peaceful. Zhao Kuangyin smiled and said, "Just as I predicted". Afterwards, Guo Chong came to Daliang (now known as Kaifeng Prefecture) to pay the emperor homage. After Li Chongjin rebelled and died, Guo Chong took over his titles. He died in 965, and Zhao Kuangyin posthumously honored him a grand perceptor.

== Notes and references ==
- (in Chinese) Toqto'a; et al., eds. (1345). Song Shi (宋史) [History of Song].
- (in Chinese) Li Tao (1183). Xu Zizhi Tongjian Changbian (續資治通鑑長編) [Extended Continuation to Zizhi Tongjian].
- (in Chinese) Sima Guang (1086). Zizhi Tongjian (資治通鑑) [Comprehensive Mirror for Aid in Government].
