= Emperor Xiaohe =

Emperor Xiaohe may refer to:

- Emperor He of Han (79–106)
- Emperor Zhongzong of Tang (656–710)
- Liu Jun (Northern Han) (926–968)
