= Duệ Tông =

- Vietnamese alphabet: Duệ Tông
- Chữ Hán: 睿宗
- Literal meaning: Farsighted Ancestor

Duệ Tông is the temple name used for several monarchs of Vietnam. It may refer to:

- Trần Duệ Tông (1337–1377), emperor of the Trần dynasty
- Nguyễn Phúc Thuần (1754–1777), one of the Nguyễn lords

== See also ==
- Ruizong (disambiguation) (Chinese equivalent)
- Yejong (disambiguation) (Korean equivalent)
