= Ruizong =

- Chinese: 睿宗
- Literal meaning: Farsighted Ancestor
Transcriptions
Standard Mandarin
- Hanyu Pinyin: Ruìzōng
- Wade–Giles: Jui-Tsung

Ruizong (睿宗) is a Chinese temple name. It may refer to:

- Emperor Ruizong of Tang (662–716), emperor of the Tang dynasty
- Liu Jun (Northern Han) (926–968), emperor of Northern Han
- Tolui (c. 1191–1232), posthumously promoted by his son Kublai who proclaimed the Yuan dynasty
- Zhu Youyuan (1476–1519), Ming dynasty prince, posthumously honored by his son Jiajing Emperor

== See also ==
- Yejong (disambiguation) (Korean equivalent)
- Duệ Tông (disambiguation) (Vietnamese equivalent)
