= Song Wo =

Song Wo (宋偓)
- Born: 926; Luoyang, Later Tang
- Died: 989; Ba Prefecture, Song
- Spouse(s): Lady Liu (劉), Princess Yongning (永寧公主)
- Children: Empress Song
- Parents: Song Tinghao (宋廷浩) (father); Lady Li (李), Princess Yining (義寜公主) (mother)

Chinese name
- Chinese: 宋偓
Transcriptions
Standard Mandarin
- Hanyu Pinyin: Sòng Wò

Song Wo (c. 926 – c. 989), also known as Song Yanwo (Chinese: 宋延渥), was a military officer and general who successively served the Later Jin, Later Han, Later Zhou, and Song dynasties. He was a grandson of Later Tang's founding emperor Li Cunxu, a son-in-law of Later Han's founding emperor Liu Zhiyuan, and (through his daughter Empress Song) the father-in-law of Song dynasty's founding emperor Zhao Kuangyin.
