= Liu Ji'en =

Northern Han emperor in 968

Liu Ji'en (Chinese: 劉繼恩), (935 – 968) also known in historiography as Shaozhu of Northern Han (Chinese: 北漢少主), was the third emperor of China's Northern Han dynasty during the Five Dynasties and Ten Kingdoms period. He ruled for 60 days in 968 before being killed as he slept in his Qinzheng chambers.

== Biography ==
Liu Ji'en, the son of the foot soldier Xue Zhao (薛釗), was originally surnamed Xue. Liu Chong, the Northern Han's founding emperor, married one of his daughters to Xue Zhao. Because Xue Zhao was a son-in-law, Liu Chong assumed personal command of him. Xue had no skills, so Liu fed and clothed him without employing him. Xue Zhao's wife often stayed with her father, Liu Chong, rarely seeing Xue. This made him discontent. While drunk, he stabbed her with his sword, injuring her, before killing himself. Liu's daughter later married into the He family, giving birth to Liu Jiyuan. After Liu's daughter and her husband had died, Liu instructed his son Liu Jun to adopt Liu Ji'en and Liu Jiyuan.

Once Liu Chengjun became emperor, Liu Ji'en was appointed metropolitan custodian (尹) of Taiyuan. Liu Chengjun once commented to his powerful chief minister Guo Wuwei that "Liu Ji'en is pure and filial, but he does not have the skills to save the age, and is unfit to manage family affairs, I fear." Guo did not respond. Later, as Liu Jun lay bedridden in the Qinzheng chambers (臥勤政閤), he summoned Guo Wuwei, and held his hand, entrusting future decisions to him. Liu Jun died in the July of 968. Liu Ji'en succeeded him, despite Liu Jun and Guo Wuwei's strong doubts about his ability to govern. Liu Ji'en had already been acting as regent since Liu Jun fell ill.

Liu Ji'en delayed his own accession to inform the Khitans of the mourning underway. The envoys sent by the Northern Han to the Liao court to inform them of the death of Liu Chengjun and the accession of Liu Ji'en arrived on 16 August 968. Emperor Muzong of Liao sent envoys to condole and sacrifice. Wearing a coarse outfit of mourning, he insisted on living in the Qinzheng chambers, while the officials that formerly served Liu Jun remained at the Taiyuan prefectural offices.

On 10 September, Emperor Taizu of Song ordered troops to gather at Luzhou (潞州) to prepare to invade the Northern Han. Two days later, he established the top command, with Li Jixun as Chief Administrative Officer of the Hedong Forward Army, Dang Jin as his second in command, and Cao Bin as his Director in Chief. He Jiyun (何繼筠) was made Administrator of the Vanguard and Kang Yanzhao (康延沼) his Director in Chief. Zhao Zan was made Administrator of the Fenzhou Route, Si Chao (司超) his second in command and Li Qianpu (李謙溥) his Director in Chief.

The attack reached as far as the Dongguo River, (Note: The Song Shi uses 洞渦河 to refer to the Dongguo River, but the Shiguo Chunqiu and Xu zizhi tongjian changbian use 銅鍋河) just outside the Northern Han capital of Taiyuan.

In September, Liu Ji'en summoned high officials and imperial family members for banquet. Afterwards, he went to the Qinzheng chambers to rest. That night, palace services official (供奉官) Hou Barong (侯霸榮) led more than ten men with daggers into the chamber, killing Liu Ji'en. When he was killed, Liu Ji'en was 34 years old and had ruled for only 60 days. Other men led by Guo Wuwei infiltrated the room using ladders and killed Hou Barong and his men. Guo Wuwei then installed Liu Jiyuan.

Two versions of the assassination are given in the Xu zizhi tongjian changbian. One states that Hou brought Liu Ji'en's head to Guo after killing him. The other states that Hou acted without direction.
