= Liu Chengyou =

Later Han emperor from 948 to 951

Emperor Yin of Later Han 後漢隱帝

Emperor of the Later Han dynasty
- Reign: 14 March 948 – 2 January 951
- Predecessor: Liu Zhiyuan
- Self-claimed successor: Liu Chong (founder of the Northern Han dynasty)
- Born: 28 March 931; Ye, Later Tang dynasty (today's Linzhang County, Hebei, China)
- Died: 2 January 951 (aged 19) near Kaifeng, Henan
- Burial: Ying Mausoleum (潁陵; in modern Yuzhou, Henan)
Names
- Surname: Liú (劉); Given name: Chéngyòu (承祐)
Era dates
- Qiányòu (乾祐) (inherited from Liu Zhiyuan) (13 February 948 – 8 February 951)
Posthumous name
- Emperor Yǐn (隱皇帝)
- House: Liu
- Dynasty: Later Han
- Father: Liu Zhiyuan
- Mother: Empress Li

Liu Chengyou
- Traditional Chinese: 劉承祐
- Simplified Chinese: 刘承祐
Transcriptions
Standard Mandarin
- Hanyu Pinyin: Liú Chéngyòu
- Wade–Giles: Liu^{2} Ch'eng^{2}-yu^{4}
Yue: Cantonese
- Yale Romanization: Lau^{4} Sing^{4}-yau^{6}
- Jyutping: Lau^{4} Sing^{4}-jau^{6}

Liu Chengyou (Chinese: 劉承祐) (28 March 931 – 2 January 951), also known by his posthumous name as the Emperor Yin of Later Han (後漢隱帝), was the second and last emperor of the Later Han dynasty of China, during the Five Dynasties and Ten Kingdoms period. He reigned from 948 until his death in 951.

Liu Chengyou was only 16 years old when he succeeded his father Liu Zhiyuan (Emperor Gaozu), who died abruptly. His reign was marked by the arbitrary killing of his important ministers, which eventually led to his downfall. When he killed the entire family of general Guo Wei without Guo in 951, Guo's army attacked the capital, and Liu Chengyou was killed in the chaos.

There is a reference to Liu Chengyou as "Liu Chenghan" in the epitaph of Liu Zhiyuan, son of his cousin Liu Yun. Liu Chengyou may thus have changed his name on his accession as emperor.

== Background ==
Liu Chengyou was born in 931 at Yedu (鄴都, in modern Handan, Hebei), at the house of his father Liu Zhiyuan. His father was a trusted officer under the general Shi Jingtang, son-in-law of then-reigning emperor Li Siyuan (Emperor Mingzong) of Later Tang. His mother was Liu Zhiyuan's wife, Lady Li. He had two brothers, Liu Chengxùn (劉承訓), who was nine years older than him, and Liu Chengxūn (劉承勳, note different tones), who was younger. It is not known whether his brothers were Lady Li's sons. He also had an adoptive brother, Liu Yun, the biological son of his uncle Liu Chong, whom Liu Zhiyuan favored and adopted as a son.

In 941, after Shi Jingtang overthrew Later Tang and established his state of Later Jin, Liu Zhiyuan acted as the military governor of Hedong Circuit (河東, headquartered in modern Taiyuan, Shanxi). The 10-year-old Liu Chengyou was given the title of an overseer of the circuit headquarters. In 947, after Later Jin was destroyed by the Khitan Liao dynasty, Liu Zhiyuan declared himself emperor of the new state, Later Han and Liu Chengyou was given the title of General. His older brother Liu Chengxùn was given more substantive responsibilities, including overseeing Taiyuan while Liu Zhiyuan advanced south to take over the central parts of former Later Jin territory. He became mayor of Kaifeng after Liu Zhiyuan successfully took the Later Jin capital as his own.

In late 947, Li Chengxùn died. This greatly affected Liu Zhiyuan's health, and by spring of 948 he was on the edge of death. He summoned the chancellor Su Fengji, the chief of staff (Shumishi) Yang Bin, the Imperial Guard commander Shi Hongzhao, and the deputy chief of staff Guo Wei, and told them "My remaining time is short, and I cannot speak much. Chengyou is still young and weak, so I entrust to you what happens after my death." He also told them to guard against the retired general Du Chongwei. After he died, the four did not immediately announce his death but instead issued an edict in his name putting Du to death. They also issued an edict in his name making Liu Chengyou the Prince of Zhou and giving him the title of Chancellor (同中書門下平章事, Tong Zhongshu Menxia Pingzhangshi). Shortly thereafter, they announced that the emperor had died, and Liu Chengyou took the throne at the age of 17. He honored his mother Empress Li as empress dowager.

== Reign ==
=== Initial months ===
Liu Chengyou's young administration immediately had to deal with a potential rebellion on the border with Later Shu, to the west. Before Liu Zhiyuan died, he had sent the Imperial Guard general Wang Jingchong with an army to visit Jinchang (晉昌, headquartered in modern Xi'an, Shaanxi) and Fengxiang (鳳翔, headquartered in modern Baoji, Shaanxi) Circuits, then governed by Zhao Kuangzan (趙匡贊) and Hou Yi (侯益) respectively. Both Zhao and Hou had previously submitted to Later Han, then changed their minds and submitted to Later Shu, and finally resubmitted to Later Han. Liu Zhiyuan had given Wang secret instructions that if Zhao and Hou had already left for Kaifeng to pay homage to the emperor by the time that he arrived, then he was not to act against them. If instead they had not left for Kaifeng and were watching for developments, he should kill them.

When Wang reached Jinchang, Zhao had already set out for Kaifeng. Wang merged his army with Zhao's and continued to Fengxiang. While he was on the road to Fengxiang, Liu Zhiyuan died and Liu Chengyou took the throne. When Wang reached Fengxiang, Hou had not left for Kaifeng, and Wang's associates suggested that he follow Liu Zhiyuan's instructions and execute Hou. However, Wang hesitated because Liu Chengyou was not aware of the secret instructions Liu Zhiyuan had given him. Hou heard of this and immediately left for Kaifeng without informing Wang. Hou was exceedingly rich, and on arriving in Kaifeng managed to repair his political situation by giving many gifts to the chancellors and to Shi Hongzhao. He was made acting mayor of Kaifeng and given an honorary chancellor title.

Hou made many accusations of overstepping against Wang Jingchong, as revenge for Wang's considering killing him. When Wang heard that Hou had been made the acting mayor of Kaifeng, he became concerned. Meanwhile, the imperial attendant Wang Yi (王益) was sent to Fengxiang to recall Zhao's soldiers to Kaifeng. This caused anxiety among the soldiers, including the officers Zhao Siwan (趙思綰) and Chang Yanqing (常彥卿). Wang Jingchong encouraged their anxiety, with the result that Zhao and Chang considered a mutiny. When Wang Yi and the army reached Chang'an (capital of Jinchang, now renamed Yongxing (永興)), Zhao led the soldiers in mutiny and occupied the city. He conscripted the young men of the city, resulting in a total force of 4,000 men, and prepared for battle.

At the same time, Wang Jingchong was encouraging the people of Fengxiang to submit petitions for him to be retained at Fengxiang as military governor. This led to concern at court that he too would rebel. The governing officials issued an edict moving Wang Shou'en (王守恩), the military governor of Jingnan Circuit (靜難, headquartered in modern Xianyang, Shaanxi) to Yongxing, and Zhao Hui (趙暉) the military governor of Baoyi Circuit (保義, headquartered in Sanmenxia, Henan) to Fengxiang. Wang Jingchong was made the acting military governor of Jingnan. However, this did not satisfy Wang.

During this period there was also infighting within the court. Yang Bin, then one of the chiefs of staff (Shumishi), criticized Su Fengji, who was then the leading chancellor, over the fact that Su was filling many official positions that had long been left open. Yang believed that these were unnecessary positions and a waste of government resources. Another chancellor, Li Tao, submitted a petition to Liu Chengyou arguing that Yang and Guo, who was serving as Yang's deputy, should be relieved of their positions and made military governors of key circuits. He proposed that the chief of staff positions should be entrusted to Su Fengji and Su Yugui. Yang and Guo heard about Li Tao's petition and went to Empress Dowager Li, weeping. They said "Your subjects have followed the deceased emperor through difficult times. Now, the Son of Heaven is accepting the word of others and wants to send us away. Given that there are troubles west of the pass, how can we, your subjects and ignore the affairs of the state? If we are not to remain, we hope to at least remain until the deceased emperor's burial." Empress Dowager Li went to Liu Chengyou and said "These are the old and accomplished subjects of the state. Why are you listening to others and expelling them?" Liu Chengyou blamed the matter on the chancellors as a group, but Li Tao took the blame to himself and was relieved of his chancellor position. Later, Yang was given an additional chancellor position, while Guo was made co-chief of staff. Yang thus became the main decision-maker, with the two Su chancellors (along with the other chancellor Dou Zhengu) no longer having real chancellor authority.

=== Li Shouzhen's rebellion ===
Meanwhile, another governor was considering a rebellion of his own. Li Shouzhen, the military governor of Huguo Circuit (護國, headquartered in modern Yuncheng, Shanxi), had previously been closely associated with Du Chongwei and therefore had been fearful since Du's death. Zhao Siwan offered to support him, and he declared himself the Prince of Qin and formally rose against the Later Han government. In rebelling, he was counting on the fact that he had commanded the imperial army for a long period when the Later Jin state was in existence. He therefore believed he could entice the army to defect to him. Acting as the Prince, he commissioned Zhao and Wang Shou'en with military governorships. Wang sent messages to Later Shu, seeking its aid.

Liu Chengyou's government sent a force to attack the three rebellious circuits, but it foundered due to conflicts among the commanding generals. Liu Chengyou decided that he needed a senior general to oversee the operation, and commissioned Guo Wei to do so. Guo, following the advice of a senior official, Feng Dao, decided to issue many material rewards to the imperial soldiers to earn their loyalty, in the hope of inducing them to forget about Li's past command over them. From this point on Guo was loved by the army.

Guo consulted the generals under him on the options for subduing the three rebels. Most advocated attacking Chang'an and Fengxiang first. In contrast Hu Yanke (扈彥珂) the military governor of Zhenguo Circuit (鎮國, headquartered in modern Weinan, Shaanxi) proposed attacking Huguo first, pointing out that Li was the leader of the three circuits' rebellion. If the other two cities were attacked first, Li would be able to attack the Later Han army from the rear. Guo agreed with Hu and ordered that the Later Han army should converges on Huguo's capital Hezhong Municipality (河中). When they reached Hezhong in fall 948, they put it under siege. Li was surprised, as he had expected the soldiers to quickly defect to him. Guo decided not to attack Hezhong directly, but rather to surround the city and let Li's food and other supplies dwindle. Meanwhile, Zhao Hui also put Fengxiang under siege, and defeated multiple attempts by Later Shu forces to lift the siege on the city.

Zhao Siwan surrendered to Later Han forces besieging Chang'an under the command of Guo Congyi (郭從義), the military governor of Zhenning Circuit (鎮寧, headquartered in modern Puyang, Henan) and was made the acting military governor of Zhenguo. However, he then hesitated about reporting to his posting, and Guo Congyi killed him.

By summer 949, Hezhong was in a desperate situation, with people dying of starvation. Li made multiple attempts to fight his way out of the city but failed. Realizing that Hezhong was now vulnerable, Guo ordered constant attacks. Eventually, Hezhong's outer city fell, and Li retreated into the inner city to commit suicide with his family. Hearing that Hezhong and Chang'an had fallen, Wang Jingchong committed suicide as well, ending the rebellions.

=== After Li Shouzhen's rebellion ===
After the three circuits' rebellions were quelled, Liu Chengyou became increasingly arrogant and frivolous. He spent time with the director of imperial stables, Hou Kuangzan (後匡贊), and the director of tea and wine, Guo Yunming (郭允明), often in inappropriate conversations. His mother, Empress Dowager Li, tried to advise him against this behavior, but he ignored both her and the official Zhang Yuan (張遠), who gave him similar advice.

In summer 950 there had been constant Liao incursions. The northern circuits needed better coordination in their response, and Liu's officials decided to post an overall commander in the north to oversee the defenses. Guo Wei was commanded to take up a position at Yedu and oversee the operations. Shi Hongzhao advocated for Guo to keep his chief of staff title even while serving as commander, so that his orders to the military governors would carry greater weight. Su Fengji opposed this idea, pointing out that there was no precedent for a chief of staff to leave the capital and continue to be chief of staff, but Liu overruled him. Guo was then made the defender of Yedu and military governor of Tianxiong Circuit (天雄, headquartered at Yedu), and continued to hold the title of chief of staff, with power to authorize military movements and expenditures north of the Yellow River.

At the send-off dinner for Guo, which was held at the mansion of Dou Zhengu, frictions within the imperial government came to the forefront. At the feast, Shi toasted Guo and harshly commented "How could there have been opposition when we discussed this matter yesterday at the imperial gathering? Now, let us drink, younger brother!" Su and Yang Bin raised their cups and said "This is an important matter for the state. Do not bear grudges!" Shi responded, again in a harsh voice "To settle the state, it takes long spears and large swords. What use does the ink brush have?" The director of finances, Wang Zhang, responded "Without ink brushes, where does money come from?" From this point on, there was increasing tension between generals and chancellors. Later, when Guo was about to leave the capital, he went to see Liu Chengyou and said:

The Empress Dowager had long followed the deceased Emperor, and she has experienced many things. Your Imperial Majesty is in your prime years. If there are important matters, it is best to ask for her advice and follow it. You should be close to the faithful and honest, and be far away from the slanderous and the wicked. Be careful in examining good and evil. Su Fengji, Yang Bin, and Shi Hongzhao are all the deceased Emperor's old subjects. They are faithful and caring for the state. May it be that Your Imperial Majesty trust them and use them, and there will be no trouble. As far as what happens on the battlefield, I, your subject, wish to expend all of my foolish and foolhardy efforts, hopefully being worthy of your service.

Liu Chengyou thanked Guo, but the tension between the officials continued. Not long after Guo's departure, Wang Zhang hosted a feast. During the feast, there was a drinking game that Shi was unfamiliar with. The director of diplomatic protocol, Yan Jinqing (閻晉卿), was seated next to Shi, and repeatedly reminded him of what the rules of the game were. Su joked "When you are seated next to someone named Yan, you need not fear being punished." However, Shi misunderstood the comment, thinking that Su was satirizing his wife Lady Yan, who was once a prostitute working in a drinking hall. He cursed Su and attempted to attack him. Yang wept and urged him to stop, saying "Lord Su is a chancellor. If you, Lord, killed him, what kind of a place are you putting the Son of Heaven into? Please think carefully!" When Liu Chengyou heard of this, he sent the director of palace affairs, Wang Jun, to try to moderate between Su and Shi, but he could not repair the relationship. Su considered requesting an assignment as a circuit military governor, but then decided that if he left the capital, Shi could easily destroy him. Wang did request such an assignment, but Yang and Shi urged him not to leave the capital.

By winter 950, the imperial government was considered well-run under Yang's leadership, and Shi's oversight of the capital made it safe for the public. However, Liu Chengyou was tired of the control his senior officials had over his government, partly because he was unable to offer powerful positions to his close associates and relatives of the empress dowager. At the time, Empress Dowager Li's younger brother Li Ye (李業) was serving as the director of miscellaneous affairs (武德使, Wudeshi) inside the palace, but wanted to be promoted to the higher position of director of palace affairs. Both Liu Chengyou and Empress Dowager Li were supportive of this, but Yang and Shi considered the promotion inappropriate as he lacked seniority. Yang and Shi also frustrated Liu's desires in other ways. His friends Hou Kuangzan, Guo Yunming, and Nie Wenjin (聶文進), the liaison officer at the office of the chiefs of staff, were resentful that they had not been promoted. When Liu Chengyou wanted to make his favorite concubine, Consort Geng, Empress, Yang opposed it, considering this move to come too soon after his mourning period for Liu Zhiyuan. Consort Geng then died, and Yang opposed Liu Chengyou's wishes to have her buried with the ceremonies due to an empress. Yang and Shi also embarrassed Liu by telling him to "be quiet" during a discussion of matters of state. Liu therefore became resentful toward them, and his close associates falsely accused Yang and the other senior officials of plotting against him. As Su resented Shi, he also incited Li Ye and the others to complain of him to Liu.

Liu Chengyou then plotted with Li Ye, Nie, Hou, and Guo Yunming to kill Yang and the others. When he reported his plans to Empress Dowager Li, she said "How can such things be easily considered! You should discuss with the chancellors further." Li Ye told Liu Chengyou "The deceased Emperor said that matters of the state should not be discussed with scholars. Their timidity will ruin you." When Empress Dowager Li tried to intervene again, Liu Chengyou responded angrily, saying "The matters of state cannot be decided in the halls of a woman!"

On December 24, 950, as the imperial officials were arriving at the palace for a gathering, soldiers appeared and killed Yang, Shi, and Wang Zhang. Liu Chengyou subsequently accused the dead men of treason, and told the chancellors and the other officials "Yang Bin and the others viewed us as a young child. We can finally be your true lord. You should not worry!" He sent soldiers to arrest and kill the relatives and close associates of Yang, Shi, and Wang. In addition, he sent his attendant Meng Ye (孟業) to deliver secret edicts to Chan Prefecture (澶州, Zhenning's capital) and Yedu, ordering Zhenning's military governor Li Hongyi (李洪義, Empress Dowager Li's younger brother) to kill Shi's most trusted Imperial Guard general, Wang Yin (王殷), who was stationed there. He ordered the Imperial Guard generals Guo Chongwei and Cao Wei (曹威), then stationed at Yedu, to kill Guo Wei and Wang Jun. Li Ye also ordered Liu Zhu (劉銖), later the acting mayor of Kaifeng, to slaughter the families of Guo Wei and Wang Jun. Liu Zhu was thorough in this task, and it was said that no woman or child escaped. Li Ye also ordered another brother, Li Hongjian (李洪建), to slaughter Wang Yin's family, but Li instead put Wang's family members under house arrest.

=== Guo Wei's rebellion ===
When Meng Ye delivered the edict to Li Hongyi, Li became concerned that Wang Yin might have already found out what was happening. Instead of following instructions, he alerted Wang, who then put Meng under arrest. Wang then sent Li's deputy Chen Guangsui (陳光穗) to show the secret edict to Guo Wei. Guo's assistant Wei Renpu suggested that he mount a resistance. Guo Wei then summoned Guo Chongwei and Cao Wei and other generals, and told them about the edict and the deaths of Yang Bin, Shi Hongzhao, and Wang Zhang. Guo Wei said "Those lords and I fought through the thorn bushes in following the deceased Emperor in seizing the realm. We accepted his trust to protect his orphan, and we expended our efforts to defend the empire. Now, those lords are dead. How can I have the heart to live on my own? Gentlemen, you should carry out the edict. Take my head and offer it to the Son of Heaven, so that you will not suffer." The generals wept and encouraged him to resist, using the rationale that he should clear Liu Chengyou's court of evil people rather than suffer an unjust death. Guo Wei therefore resolved to rise against Liu Chengyou. He left his adopted son Guo Rong to defend Yedu and marched toward Kaifeng, with Guo Chongwei as his forward commander.

Meanwhile, Liu Chengyou had summoned several prominent generals to the capital, including Liu Zhiyuan's half-brother Murong Yanchao, Gao Xingzhou, and Fu Yanqing. Murong immediately went to Kaifeng, and Liu Chengyou put him in charge of the imperial army. As Guo marched toward the capital, Hou Yi advocated defending the city without engaging him: he argued that because Guo's soldiers' family members were all in the capital, the government could prevail by having the soldiers' families urge them to defect from Guo. Murong, however, advocated engaging Guo's army, saying "Hou Yi is old. He is being a coward." Liu Chengyou therefore planned to engage Guo's army, but sent Hou, Wu Qianyu (吳虔裕), the defender of Zheng Prefecture (鄭州, in modern Zhengzhou, Henan), and Zhang Yanchao (張彥超) the former military governor of Baoda Circuit (保大, headquartered in modern Yan'an, Shaanxi), with an army to head toward Chan. However, Guo got there first, and Li Hongyi submitted to him. Wang Yin merged his army into Guo's, and Guo then continued to Hua Prefecture (滑州, in modern Anyang, Henan), where Song Yanwo, the military governor of Yicheng Circuit (義成, headquartered at Hua), surrendered to him. Wang Yin again offered his army the option of beheading him and submitting to the emperor instead of fighting the emperor's army; they refused. Wang Jun then told them that when Kaifeng fell, they could pillage the capital, and they celebrated. By this point, Liu Chengyou had become worried and said to Dou Zhengu "Maybe I was being too frivolous." At Li Ye's suggestion, over Su Yugui's objection, he emptied the imperial treasury to reward the Imperial Guard soldiers at Kaifeng and also the family members of Guo's army, in the hopes that they would persuade Guo's soldiers to defect.

On December 30, Guo's army reached Fengqiu (封丘, in modern Xinxiang, Henan), near Kaifeng. The people of Kaifeng were frightened, including Empress Dowager Li, who commented "We did not listen to Li Tao. Now destruction comes!" Murong bragged that he could easily capture Guo — until Nie Wenjin told him the names of Guo's generals, when he began to be apprehensive as well. Liu sent the Imperial Guard general Yuan Yi (袁㠖) and Liu Chongjin (劉重進), the former military governor of Weisheng Circuit (威勝, headquartered in modern Nanyang, Henan), to rendezvous with Hou, Wu, and Zhang and prepare to engage Guo.

On December 31, Guo's army and the imperial army met at Liuzi Slope (劉子陂). Liu Chengyou wanted to encourage the troops personally. Empress Dowager Li told him "Guo Wei is our family's old servant. Why would he be doing this if it were not a matter of life or death? You should keep the troops in the city and send a messenger with your edict, to observe his intentions. He would surely respond, and you can still maintain the formality of emperor and subject. Do not go out yourself." The young emperor refused her advice. The empress dowager asked Nie to take responsibility for the emperor's safety, but Nie dismissed this, responding "Your subject is here. Even if there were 100 Guo Weis, they can all be captured." No battle occurred that day, and Liu Chengyou returned to the palace. Murong bragged to him "These days, Your Imperial Majesty has little to do in the palace. Tomorrow, come watch your subject destroy the bandits. I need not battle with them, I will just rebuke them, and they will surely collapse and return to their barracks!" (i.e., abandon Guo and return to Kaifeng).

On January 1, 951, the young emperor again encouraged the army personally, against Empress Dowager Li's advice. The front lines of the two armies met, and Guo Wei ordered his army not to engage first, stating "I am here to kill the scoundrels, not to oppose the Son of Heaven. Do not move first." After some hesitation, Murong led the emperor's cavalry in a charge, starting the battle. Guo Chongwei and Li Rong resisted Murong's charge. During the battle, Zhang's horse fell, and he was nearly captured by Guo Wei's army. He withdrew, but lost more than 100 of his soldiers. This caused a loss of morale in the imperial army, and imperial soldiers began to surrender to Guo's. Even the generals, including Hou, Wu, Zhang, Yuan, and Liu Chongjin, all secretly went to see Guo to offer to surrender, but he sent them all back to their camps, saying to Song, whose wife was Liu Zhiyuan's oldest daughter "The Son of Heaven is in danger. You, Lord, are his close relative. You should take your guards to go protect him, and also request that he find a chance to come to my camp." However, when Song tried to go to the imperial tent, there were confused soldiers in the way and he did not dare to advance. Towards the end of the day more and more of the imperial army surrendered to Guo's. Murong abandoned the imperial army and fled back to Taining's capital Yan Prefecture (兗州) with only a handful of his guards. Liu Chengyou stayed in his tent that night with three chancellors (Su Fengji, Su Yugui, and Dou) and fewer than 100 attendants.

On January 2, 951, at sunrise, Guo Wei saw the emperor's banner and sped towards it, hoping to find the emperor. When he got there Liu Chengyou had already left, attempting to return to the palace. When he reached Xuanhua Gate (玄化門), guarded by Liu Zhu, Liu Zhu fired arrows at the emperor's attendants, and Liu Chengyou fled. He was intercepted by Guo's soldiers at Zhao Village (趙村). He dismounted and tried to hide in a civilian's house, but was killed there. Accounts of his death differ. The Zizhi Tongjian states that he was killed by soldiers in the confusion and that when he died, Su Fengji, Yan Jinqing, and Guo Yunming all committed suicide. The Old History of the Five Dynasties states that Guo Yunming, knowing that the cause was lost, killed him (possibly at his request) and then committed suicide with Su Fengji.

Guo Wei had the young emperor's body retrieved and placed in a casket. There were suggestions that Liu Chengyou should be buried with only the ceremony due a duke, as was Cao Mao (emperor of Cao Wei). Instead, after Guo seized the throne and established Later Zhou, he had Liu Chengyou mourned and buried with the ceremony due to an emperor.

== Family ==
- Father
  - Liu Zhiyuan, Emperor Gaozu of Later Han
- Mother
  - Empress Li
- Wife
  - Lady Zhang, daughter of Zhang Yancheng (張彥成)
- Major Concubine
  - Consort Geng (d. 950?)

=== Ancestry ===
Ancestors of Liu Chengyou, Emperor Yin of Later Han

16. Liu Ang (劉昂)
8. Liu Zhuan (劉僎)
17. Lady Yang (楊氏)
4. Liu Dian (劉典)
9. Lady Li (李氏)
2. Liu Zhiyuan (Emperor Gaozu)
5. Lady An (安氏)
1. Liu Chengyou (Emperor Yin)
3. Empress Li

Liu Chengyou House of Liu (947–951) Born: 931 Died: 951
Regnal titles
Preceded by Liu Zhiyuan (Emperor Gaozu)	Emperor of Later Han; 948–951	Succeeded by None (traditionally), title claimed by Liu Chong of Northern Han
Preceded by Liu Zhiyuan (Emperor Gaozu)	Emperor of China (Central Shanxi); 948–951	Succeeded by None (traditionally), title claimed by Liu Chong of Northern Han
Preceded by Liu Zhiyuan (Emperor Gaozu)	Emperor of China (Central); 948–951	Succeeded by Guo Wei of Later Zhou
Preceded by Liu Zhiyuan (Emperor Gaozu)	Emperor of China (Hunan) (de jure); 948–950	Succeeded by Li Jing of Southern Tang
