= Liu Chong =

Emperor of (Northern) Han from 951 to 954

Emperor Shizu of Northern Han 北漢世祖
- Emperor Shizu of (Northern) Han (more...)

1st emperor of Northern Han
- Reign: 951–954
- Claimed predecessor: Liu Chengyou, nephew and last emperor of Later Han
- Successor: Liu Chengjun (Emperor Ruizong), son
- Born: 895 or January 896 (Note: From his date and Chinese age at death we can deduct that he was born some time between 30 January 895 and 18 January 896.); Tang dynasty
- Died: 954 (aged 59); Taiyuan, Northern Han dynasty (today's Taiyuan, Shanxi)
- Issue: Liu Yun (劉贇), son; Liu Chengjun (劉承鈞), son; Liu Gao (劉鎬), son; Liu Kai (劉鍇), son; Liu Qi (劉錡), son; Liu Xi (劉錫), son; Liu Xian (劉銑), son; daughter, mother of Liu Ji'en and Liu Jiyuan
Names
- Family name: Liú (劉); Given name: Chóng (崇), changed to Mín (旻) in 951 (Note: Many Chinese emperors changed their given names to rarely encountered characters to alleviate the burden of the populace who must observe naming taboo.)
Era dates
- Qiányòu (乾祐), continued from Later Han's Emperor Gaozu and Emperor Yin; Year 4: 9 February 951 – 29 January 952; Year 5: 30 January 952 – 17 January 953; Year 6: 18 January 953 – 5 February 954; Year 7: 6 February 954 – 26 January 955
Posthumous name
- Emperor Shénwǔ (神武皇帝) (951)
Temple name
- Shìzǔ (世祖; "Generational Forefather")
- House: Liu
- Dynasty: Northern Han
- Father: Liu Dian (劉琠)
- Mother: Lady An (安氏)

Liu Min (Chinese: 劉旻) (c. 895 – 954), named Liu Chong (Chinese: 劉崇) before 951,, also known by his temple name as the Emperor Shizu of Northern Han, was the founding emperor of the Northern Han dynasty of China during the Five Dynasties and Ten Kingdoms period. He was an ethnic Shatuo and the younger brother of the Later Han dynasty's founder Liu Zhiyuan (Emperor Gaozu).

Liu Chong created Northern Han in the Shatuo base in modern Shanxi after his eldest son was killed in 951 by general Guo Wei, who overthrew Later Han dynasty to establish the Later Zhou dynasty. In 954, Liu Chong was defeated by Guo's successor Chai Rong in the Battle of Gaoping and died soon afterwards.

== Early life ==
The young Liu Chong drank and gambled and was once sentenced to join the military with his face tattooed.

== During Later Jin ==
When Liu Zhiyuan became the military governor of Hedong (河東; roughly modern Shanxi), he named Liu Chong his chief director (都指揮使).

== Formation of the Northern Han ==
Liu Min was the brother of Liu Zhiyuan, the founder of the Later Han state, which was the last of three successive Shatuo Turk dynasties. The Later Han fell in 950 with the rise of the Later Zhou. Liu Min declared himself the legitimate successor of the Later Han and formed the Northern Han (sometimes called Eastern Han) kingdom in Shanxi, the traditional power base of the Shatuo Turks.

== Relations with neighbouring states ==
The kingdom was wedged between its two larger, more powerful neighbors, the Later Zhou to the south, and the Liao dynasty to the north. Liu Min restored traditional ties with the Liao, who served as protectors to the Northern Han, allowing it to last later than any of the other kingdoms traditionally listed as one of the Ten Kingdoms.

== Family ==
- Father
  - Liu Dian (劉琠), posthumously honored Emperor Zhangsheng with the temple name of Xianzu
- Mother
  - Lady An, Lady Dowager of Wu, posthumously honored Empress Zhangyi
- Wife
  - Empress (name unknown)
- Concubine
  - Consort Wang (915-971)
- Children
  - Liu Chengyun or Liu Yun, the Duke of Xiangyin (created 951, killed by Guo Wei 951)
  - Liu Chengjun (Liu Jun) (劉承鈞), later Emperor Ruizong
  - Liu Hao (劉鎬), killed by Liu Jiyuan ~968
  - Liu Kai (劉鍇), killed by Liu Jiyuan ~968
  - Liu Qi (劉錡), killed by Liu Jiyuan ~968
  - Liu Xí (劉錫, note different tone than his brother), killed by Liu Jiyuan ~968
  - Liu Xǐ (劉銑, note different tone than his brother)
  - At least three more sons
  - Princess, mother of Liu Ji'en and Liu Jiyuan

== Notes ==
Regnal titles
Preceded by None (traditionally), claimed to be succeeding Liu Chengyou of Later Han	Emperor of Northern Han; 951–954	Succeeded by Liu Chengjun (Emperor Ruizong)
Preceded by None (traditionally), claimed to be succeeding Liu Chengyou of Later Han	Emperor of China (Central Shanxi); 951–954	Succeeded by Liu Chengjun (Emperor Ruizong)
