= Liu Jun (Northern Han) =

Emperor of Northern Han from 954 to 968

Emperor Ruizong of Northern Han 北漢睿宗

2nd Emperor of Northern Han
- Reign: 954–968
- Predecessor: Liu Chong
- Successor: Liu Ji'en
- Born: Liu Chengjun (劉承鈞); 926
- Died: 968 (aged 41–42)
Names
- Family name: Liu (劉); Given name: Chengjun (承鈞), later Jun (鈞)
Era dates
- Qianyou (乾祐): 954–956; Tianhui (天會): 957–968
Posthumous name
- Emperor Xiaohe (孝和皇帝)
Temple name
- Ruizong (睿宗)
- House: Liu
- Dynasty: Northern Han
- Father: Liu Chong

Liu Jun (Chinese: 劉鈞) (926–968), originally Liu Chengjun (Chinese: 劉承鈞), also known by his temple name as the Emperor Ruizong of Northern Han (北漢睿宗), was the second emperor of the Shatuo-led Northern Han dynasty of China. His capital was at Taiyuan, Shanxi Province. He was the second son of the Northern Han founder Liu Chong (Emperor Shizu). In 951, after the death of his brother Liu Yun, he became the heir of his father.

== Wife ==
- Empress Guo, died 968

== Sons ==
- Liu Ji'en, 3rd emperor of Northern Han
- Liu Jiyuan, 4th and last emperor of Northern Han
- Liu Jiqing, 3rd son, died 973
- Liu Jiwen, adopted nephew, grandson of Liu Chong
- 5th son, died 973

Preceded by Liu Chong	Emperor of Northern Han; 954–968	Succeeded by Liu Ji'en
