= Yejong =

Yejong (睿宗) is the temple name of two Korean monarchs, derived from the Chinese equivalent "Ruìzōng":

- Yejong of Goryeo (1079-1122, r. 1105–1122)
- Yejong of Joseon (r. 1468–1469)

== See also ==
- Ruizong (disambiguation) (Chinese romanization)
