= Northern Han =

Dynastic state of China in the Ten Kingdoms period

Han 漢
- 951–979
- The Northern Han in 951
- Capital: Taiyuan
- Common languages: Chinese
- Religion: Buddhism, Taoism, Confucianism, Chinese folk religion
- Government: Monarchy
- Emperor
  - 951–954: Emperor Shizu
  - 954–968: Emperor Ruizong
  - 968: Emperor Shaozhu
  - 968–979: Emperor Yingwu
- Historical era: Five Dynasties and Ten Kingdoms Period
  - Established: 951
  - Ended by the Song dynasty: 979
- Currency: Chinese cash, Chinese coin, copper coins etc.
Preceded by	Succeeded by
Later Han (Five Dynasties)	Song dynasty
- Today part of: China

The Northern Han (simplified Chinese: 北汉; traditional Chinese: 北漢; pinyin: Běi Hàn) was a dynastic state of China and one of the Ten Kingdoms during the Five Dynasties and Ten Kingdoms period. It was founded by Liu Min (Emperor Shizu) as a continuation of the Later Han dynasty founded by his brother Liu Zhiyuan (Emperor Gaozu). The Northern Han lasted from 951 to 979, when it was conquered by the Northern Song dynasty.

== Founding of the Northern Han ==
The short-lived state of Later Han fell in 950 because of Guo Wei, a powerful military governor's de facto coup. Liu Min founded the Northern Han Kingdom, sometimes referred to as the Eastern Han, in 951 claiming that he was the legitimate heir to the imperial throne of Later Han. Liu Min immediately restored the traditional relationship with the Khitans, who had founded the Liao dynasty.

Sources conflict as to the origin of the Later Han and Northern Han emperors; some indicate sinicized Shatuo ancestry while some traditional historical sources claim that the emperors claimed patrilineal Han Chinese ancestry. (Note: According to Old History of the Five Dynasties, vol. 99, and New History of the Five Dynasties, vol. 10. Liu Zhiyuan was of Shatuo origin. According to Wudai Huiyao, vol. 1 Liu Zhiyuan's great-great-grandfather Liu Tuan (劉湍) (titled as Emperor Mingyuan posthumously, granted the temple name of Wenzu) descended from Liu Bing (劉昞), Prince of Huaiyang, a son of Emperor Ming of Han.)

== Territorial extent ==
The Northern Han was a small kingdom located in Shanxi with its capital located at Taiyuan. Shanxi had been a traditional base of power since the fading days of the Tang dynasty in the late ninth century and early tenth century. It was wedged between the two major powers of the day, the Liao dynasty to the north and the Later Zhou dynasty (then the Northern Song dynasty) to the south.

== Wedge between Liao and Song ==
The existence of the Northern Han was one of the two major thorns in relations between the Liao Dynasty and Later Zhou's successor Northern Song, the other being the continued possession of the Sixteen Prefectures by the Liao Dynasty. The Northern Han had placed itself under the protection of the Liao.

Emperor Taizu of Song was successful in nearly completing the incorporation of the southern kingdoms into the Song Dynasty by his death in 976. His younger brother, Emperor Taizong wished to emulate his older brother's successes. Wuyue was brought into the realm in 978.

== Fall of the Northern Han ==
Emboldened by his success to the south, Emperor Taizong decided to embark on a campaign to finally destroy the Northern Han. Leading the army himself, he brought his forces to the Northern Han capital of Taiyuan, which was laid under siege in June. An initial relief force sent by the Liao was easily defeated by Song. After a two-month siege of the capital, the emperor of the Northern Han surrendered and the kingdom was incorporated into the Northern Song.

== Rulers ==
Sovereigns in Northern Han Kingdom 951–979
Temple Names (Miao Hao, 廟號)	Posthumous Names (Shi Hao, 諡號)	Personal Names	Period of Reigns	Era Names (Nian Hao, 年號) and range
世祖 Shìzǔ	神武帝 Shénwǔdì	Liu Min (劉旻)	951–954	Qiányòu (乾祐) 951–954
睿宗 Ruìzōng	孝和帝 Xiàohédì	Liu Jun (劉鈞)	954–968	Qiányòu (乾祐) 954–957; Tiānhuì (天會) 957–968
少主 Shàozhǔ	Did not exist	Liu Ji'en (劉繼恩)	968	Did not exist
Did not exist	英武帝 Yīngwǔdì	Liu Jiyuan (劉繼元)	968–979	Guǎngyùn (廣運) 968–979

== The family tree of the Later Han and Northern Han rulers ==
The family tree of the Later Han and Northern Han rulers

- Later Han emperors; - Northern Han emperors

adopted
Marriage
Liu Tian 劉琠; Xianzu 显祖
Liu Zhiyuan 劉知遠 895–948; Gaozu 高祖; 947–948	Liu Min 劉旻 895–954; Shizu 世祖; 951–954
Liu Chengyou 劉承祐 931–951; Yindi 隱帝; 948–951	Liu Yun 劉贇 d.951; r.950	Liu Jun 劉钧 926–968; Ruizong 睿宗; 954–968	Xue Zhao 薛钊	Lady Liu 劉氏	Mr. He 何某
Liu Jien 劉继恩 d. 968; Shaozhu 少主; 968	Liu Jiyuan 劉继元 d. 992; Yingwudi 英武帝; 968–979
