= Liu Jiyuan =

Northern Han emperor from 968 to 979

Emperor Yingwu of Northern Han 北漢英武帝

4th emperor of Northern Han
- Reign: 968–979
- Predecessor: Liu Ji'en
- Born: Hé Jìyuán (何繼元); Unknown
- Died: 992
Names
- Family name: Liú (劉); Given name: Jìyuán (繼元); Name at birth: Hé Jìyuán (何繼元)
Era dates
- Tianhui (天會): 968–973; Guangyun (廣運): 974–979
Regnal name
- Emperor Yingwu (英武皇帝)
- House: He (by birth); Liu (adoptive)
- Dynasty: Northern Han
- Father: Sir He (何氏)
- Mother: Lady Liu (劉氏)

Liu Jiyuan
- Traditional Chinese: 劉繼元
- Simplified Chinese: 刘继元
Transcriptions
Standard Mandarin
- Hanyu Pinyin: Liú Jìyuán

Liu Jiyuan (Chinese: 劉繼元) (died in 992), also known by his regnal name as the Emperor Yingwu of (Northern) Han ((北)漢英武帝), was the last emperor of the Shatuo-led Chinese Northern Han dynasty during the Five Dynasties and Ten Kingdoms period. He was the grandson of Liu Min (Emperor Shizu). He ruled Northern Han from 968 until 979, when he surrendered to Song forces under the Emperor Taizong of Song.

== Family ==
Parents:

- Father: Sir He (何氏)
- Mother: Lady Liu (劉氏), daughter of Liu Min

Wives:

- Empress Duan, of the Duan clan (段皇后 段氏)
- Empress Ma, of the Ma clan (馬皇后 馬氏)
- Unknown:
  - Liu Shoujie/Liu Sanzhu (劉守節/劉三豬), first son
  - Liu Xu (劉續), second son
