= Liu Yun (governor) =

Liu Yun (劉贇)

Governor of Wuning Circuit
- In office June 1, 948 – January 6, 951

Personal details
- Born: Unknown; Likely Hedong Circuit
- Died: February 24, 951; Song Prefecture
- Spouse: Princess Dong (董)
- Parent: Liu Chong (father)

Liu Yun
- Traditional Chinese: 劉贇
- Simplified Chinese: 刘赟
Transcriptions
Standard Mandarin
- Hanyu Pinyin: Liú Yūn

Liu Chengyun
- Traditional Chinese: 劉承贇
- Simplified Chinese: 刘承赟
Transcriptions
Standard Mandarin
- Hanyu Pinyin: Liú Chéngyūn

Liu Yun (died February 24, 951), probably known as Liu Chengyun before 949, referred to in historical sources as the Duke of Xiangyin (湘陰公), was a military governor of the Later Han dynasty during the Five Dynasties period. He was an ethnic Shatuo.

A cousin of the Later Han emperor Liu Chengyou, Liu Yun was named Liu Chengyou's successor by Empress Dowager Li following Liu Chengyou's death, but on his way to the capital he was put under house arrest and later executed on orders of Guo Wei, who had founded the Later Zhou dynasty. After his death, his father Liu Chong founded the Northern Han dynasty and waged a war against Later Zhou to avenge his son's death.

== Background ==
It is not known when Liu Yun was born. His father was Liu Chong, who was a younger brother of Liu Zhiyuan, a major general of Later Jin, who would later found Later Han as its Emperor Gaozu. Because Liu Zhiyuan favored Liu Yun greatly, he adopted Liu Yun as a son. (He had three biological sons of his own, Liu Chengxùn (劉承訓), Liu Chengyou, and Liu Chengxūn (劉承勳, note different tone).) Because of Liu Yun's adoption into Liu Zhiyuan's house, he was probably known as Liu Chengyun after the adoption to be consistent with the names of Liu Zhiyuan's biological sons, and he was referred to as Liu Chengyun as late as 948, by which point Liu Chengyou had inherited the throne after Liu Zhiyuan's death. That year, he was commissioned the military governor (Jiedushi) of Wuning Circuit (武寧, headquartered in modern Xuzhou, Jiangsu). In 949, he was given an honorary chancellor designation Tong Zhongshu Menxia Pingzhangshi (同中書門下平章事). (By that time, he was referred to as Liu Yun, probably to observe naming taboo for his adoptive brother Liu Chengyou.)

== Aborted succession to the Later Han throne and death ==
In late 950, Liu Chengyou, tired of the control of the senior officials Yang Bin, Shi Hongzhao, Wang Zhang, and Guo Wei had on the government, had Yang, Shi, and Wang killed. He sent a messenger to order Guo's death at Yedu (鄴都, in modern Handan, Hebei), but when the news leaked, Guo was able to anticipate the arrival of the messenger and escape being killed. However, Guo's family was slaughtered, and so Guo rebelled and marched on the capital Kaifeng. In the subsequent battle near Kaifeng, Liu Chengyou was killed in the confusion. Guo entered the capital and took control of the situation.

For some time, Guo acted as if he wanted a new Later Han emperor to be named, and Liu Zhiyuan's wife and Liu Chengyou's mother Empress Dowager Li openly suggested, as possible candidates, Liu Yun's father Liu Chong; Liu Zhiyuan's cousin Liu Xin (劉信); Liu Chengxūn; and Liu Yun. Initially, the officials, including Guo, favored naming Liu Chengxūn emperor, as he was the biological son of Liu Zhiyuan, but Empress Dowager Li then revealed that Liu Chengxūn had been ill for a long time that he was not suitable for the throne. Therefore, Liu Yun became the next choice of the officials. Empress Dowager Li issued an edict naming Liu Yun the successor to the throne, and sent the senior official Feng Dao, along with other officials Zhao Shangjiao (趙上交) and Wang Du (王度) to Wuning's capital Xu Prefecture (徐州) to welcome him to the capital. (Feng, speculating that Guo did not really want to support Liu Yun to succeed to the throne, spoke to him, "Are you, Lord, acting sincerely?" Guo swore to heaven that he was being sincere. Feng, however, did not believe him, and privately told others, "For my entire life, I did not utter false words. Now I have!" However, he proceeded to Xu and delivered the empress dowager's edict.) Upon hearing of Liu Chengyou's death, Liu Chong, who was then the military governor of Hedong Circuit (河東, headquartered in modern Taiyuan, Shanxi) had initially prepared to march on Kaifeng himself to contend for succession, but upon hearing that it was Liu Yun who would succeed to the throne, remarked, "If my son were emperor, what else could I wish for?" and stopped his preparations.

After Feng arrived at Xu, Liu Yun left his officers Gong Yanmei (龔延美) and Yang Wen (楊溫) to defend Xu, and then left with Feng toward Kaifeng. On the way, the procession proceeded as if he were an imperial prince, and his attendants were proclaiming, "May you live 10,000 years!" as what one would proclaim to an emperor. When he sent messengers to Guo's army, then stationed at Chan Prefecture (澶州, in modern Puyang, Henan) to greet the generals, however, the generals refused to bow, and privately stated to each other, "We captured and slaughtered the capital. That is a great crime. If the Lius continue to be on the throne, how can we expect to have descendants?" When Guo heard this, he immediately went to Chan. When he arrived there, the soldiers there rose and proclaimed him emperor, and he then marched south toward Kaifeng, this time securing the support of the officials at Kaifeng, and prepared to seize the throne himself.

By this time, Liu Yun had reached Song Prefecture (宋州, in modern Shangqiu, Henan), with the imperial guard general Zhang Lingchao (張令超) escorting him. When Guo's allies at Kaifeng, Wang Jun and Wang Yin (王殷) heard of what happened at Chan, they sent the imperial guard general Guo Chongwei with 700 cavalry soldiers to Song, to stop Liu Yun from further advancing toward the capital. When Guo Chongwei arrived at Song and displayed his soldiers outside the mansion where Liu Yun was housed, Liu Yun was surprised, and he closed the gates and ascended a tower, to inquire what Guo Chongwei was intending to do. Guo Chongwei stated to him, "There was a mutiny at Chan Prefecture. Lord Guo was concerned that Your Imperial Majesty might not know what had happened. He therefore sent me, Guo Chongwei, to come protect you. There is nothing to be concerned about." He tried to summon Guo Chongwei into the mansion, but Guo Chongwei initially refused, but Feng then went outside the mansion to speak with Guo Chongwei. Guo Chongwei thereafter entered the mansion, and Liu Yun held his hands and wept. Guo Chongwei then assured him of Guo Wei's good intentions, before exiting. Liu Yun's assistant Dong Yi (董裔) suggested to him:

I observed Guo Chongwei's eyes and gestures, and I believe he must be intending treachery. The rumors on the street is that Guo Wei had already declared himself emperor. For Your Imperial Majesty to continue to proceed deeper into his territory would surely bring disaster. Please immediately summon Zhang Lingchao and analyze to him what he could do for himself, for good and for bad. Order him to surprise Guo Chongwei tonight with his soldiers and strip Guo Chongwei of his troops. Tomorrow, let us pillage Suiyang [(睢陽, Song Prefecture's prefectural seat)] of its gold and silk, gather its troops, and flee north to Jinyang [(晉陽, i.e., Hedong's capital Taiyuan)]. Guo Wei had just settled in the capital, and would surely not have the ability to chase us. This is the top strategy.

Liu Yun hesitated and did not immediately follow Dong's suggestion. That night, Guo Chongwei secretly met Zhang, and enticed him into merging his guards with Guo Chongwei's. Liu Yun became fearful, but was no longer able to act at this point. Guo Wei then wrote a letter to Liu Yun, stating that he was being coerced into his actions by the army; he also summoned Feng back to the capital and left Zhao and Wang to accompany Liu Yun. When Feng went to bid him goodbye, Liu Yun stated: "Why we had the confidence to come is that you, Lord, has been chancellor for 30 years, and therefore we do not suspect you. Now Guo Chongwei has stripped me of my guards, and we are in danger. What do you, Lord, think we should do?" Feng fell silent. Liu Yun's officer Jia Zhen (賈貞) gazed at Feng and considered killing him. Liu Yun, however, stated, "You should not act rashly. This has nothing to do with Lord Feng." Guo Chongwei thereafter moved him to a side mansion, and killed several of his close associates, including Dong, Jia, Liu Fu (劉福), and Xia Zhaodu (夏昭度).

Shortly after, Empress Dowager Li issued an edict, demoting Liu Yun from the emperorship that he had not yet formally taken, to be the Duke of Xiangyin. She also named Guo Wei regent. On Chinese New Year, Guo Wei took the throne, establishing Later Zhou (as its Emperor Taizu). Liu Chong submitted a petition to Guo, requesting that Liu Yun be allowed to return to Jinyang. Guo issued an edict, promising that Liu Yun's life would be spared and that, if Liu Chong would serve him as the new emperor, Liu Chong would be created an imperial prince and be allowed to retain the Hedong command for the rest of his life. Meanwhile, Gong and Yang, upon hearing that Liu Yun had been deposed, supported Liu Yun's wife Consort Dong and resisted the Later Zhou emperor's orders, hoping that aid would come from Hedong. Guo wrote Liu Yun, asking him to encourage them to surrender, promising that they would not only be spared, but would be given prefectships. Liu Yun did so, but Gong and Yang continued to hold their defense.

On February 24, 951, Liu Yun was killed on Guo's orders, at Song Prefecture. On the same day (although not yet with knowledge of that), Liu Chong declared himself emperor of Han, effectively claiming lawful succession of the Later Han throne, but typically was regarded by later historians as of a new state of Northern Han. Subsequently, Xu fell to the Later Zhou siege army, commanded by Wang Yanchao (王彥超), and Gong and Yang were killed; no reference was made to what happened with Consort Dong.

Liu Yun had a son named Liu Jiwen who would later serve as an official of Liao dynasty.

== Notes and references ==
- (in Chinese) Sima Guang (1086). Zizhi Tongjian (資治通鑑) [Comprehensive Mirror for Aid in Government].
