= Later Han (Five Dynasties) =

Imperial dynasty of China (947–951)

Han 漢
- 947–951
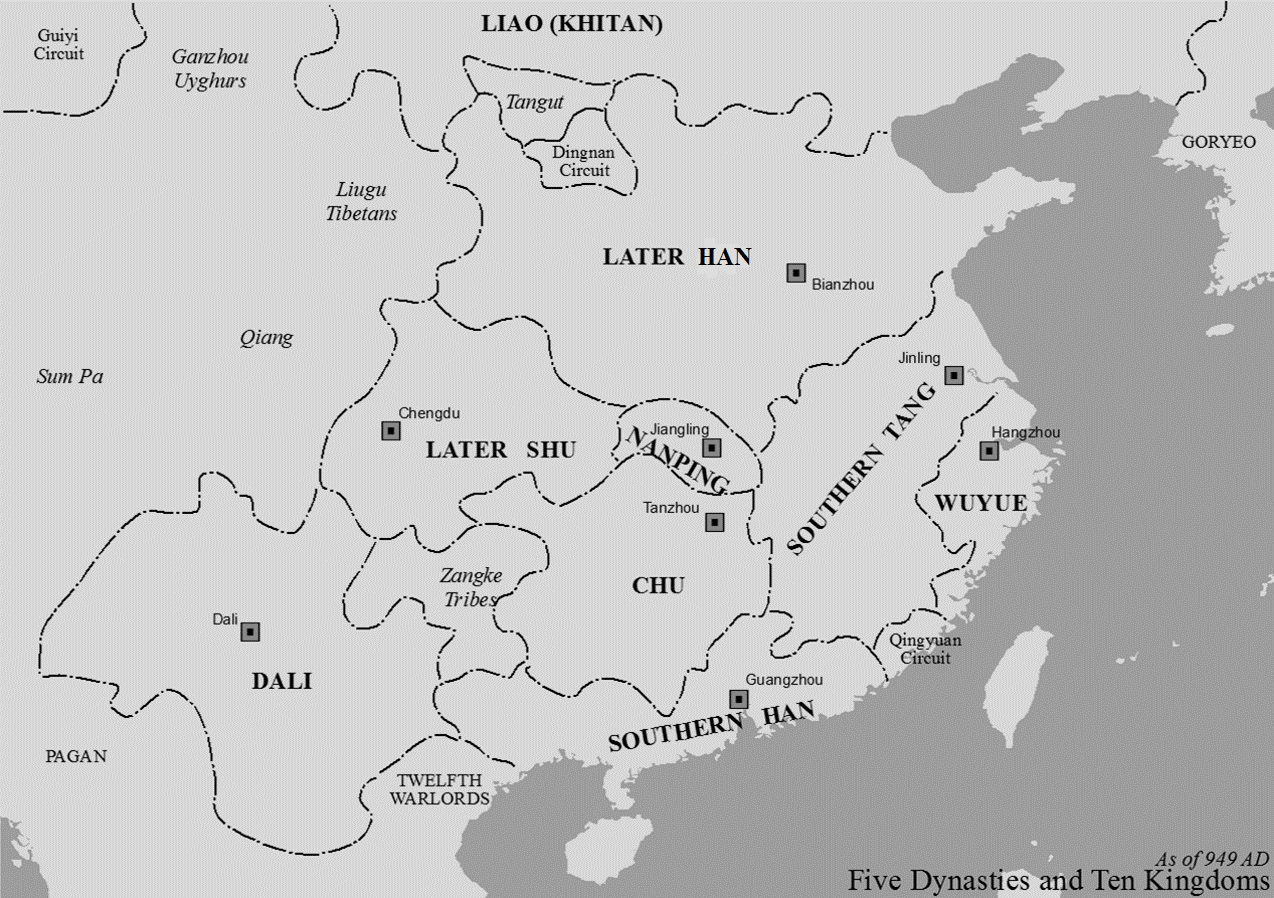
- Later Han
- Capital: Bian (Kaifeng)
- Common languages: Chinese
- Religion: Buddhism, Taoism, Confucianism, Chinese folk religion
- Government: Monarchy
- Emperor
  - 947–948: Emperor Gaozu
  - 948–951: Emperor Yin
- Historical era: Five Dynasties and Ten Kingdoms Period
  - Established in Taiyuan: March 10, 947
  - Coup d'etat, surrender of Bian; Emperor Yin killed (de facto end): January 1; January 2, 951
  - Guo Wei proclaimed Emperor (de jure end): February 13 951
- Currency: Chinese cash, Chinese coin, copper coins etc.
Preceded by	Succeeded by
Later Jìn	Later Zhou; Northern Han
- Today part of: China

Han, known as the Later Han (simplified Chinese: 后汉; traditional Chinese: 後漢; pinyin: Hòu Hàn) in historiography, was a short-lived imperial dynasty of China that existed from 947 to 951. It was the fourth of the Five Dynasties during the Five Dynasties and Ten Kingdoms period in Chinese history, and the third consecutive Shatuo-led Chinese dynasty, although other sources indicate that the Later Han emperors claimed patrilineal Han ancestry. It was among the shortest-lived of all Chinese regimes, lasting for slightly under four years before it was overthrown by a rebellion that resulted in the founding of the Later Zhou dynasty. Remnants of the Later Han then founded the Northern Han dynasty.

== Establishment ==
Liu Zhiyuan was the military governor of Bingzhou, an area around Taiyuan in present-day Shanxi that had long been a stronghold of the sinicized Shatuo. However, the Later Jin he served was weak and little more than a puppet of the expanding Khitan Liao dynasty to the north. When the Later Jin finally did decide to defy them, the Liao sent an expedition south that resulted in the destruction of the Later Jin.

The force under Emperor Taizong of Liao made it all the way to the Yellow River before he decided to return to his base in present-day Beijing, in the heart of the contentious Sixteen Prefectures. However, following constant harassment from the Chinese on the return route, he died of an illness in May 947. The combination of the fall of the Later Jin and the succession crisis among the Khitan resulted in a power vacuum. Liu Zhiyuan was able to fill that void and founded the Later Han.

Sources conflict as to the origin of the Later Han and Northern Han Emperors, some indicate Shatuo ancestry while another claims that the Emperors claimed patrilineal Han Chinese ancestry.

== Territorial extent ==
Liu Zhiyuan established his capital at Bian, present day Kaifeng. The Later Han held essentially the same territory as the Later Jin. Its southern border with the southern states stretched from the East China Sea about halfway between the Yellow River and the Yangtze River before dipping south toward the Yangtze at its mid reaches before turning northwest along the northern border of Sichuan and extending as far west as Shaanxi. In the north, it included much of Shaanxi and Hebei except the Sixteen Prefectures, which were lost by the Later Jin to what was by this time known as the Liao dynasty.

== Short-lived dynasty ==
The Later Han was among the shortest-lived regimes in the long history of China. Liu Zhiyuan died the year following the founding of the dynasty, to be succeeded by his teenaged son. The dynasty was overthrown two years later when a Han Chinese named Guo Wei led a military coup and declared himself emperor of the Later Zhou.

== Northern Han ==
The remnants of the Later Han returned to the traditional Shatuo stronghold of Shanxi and established the Northern Han kingdom, sometimes referred to as the Eastern Han. Under Liao dynasty protection, it was able to remain independent of the Later Zhou. The Song dynasty emerged from the ashes of the Later Zhou in 960 and emerged as a strong, stabilizing presence in northern China. Though they had been successful in bringing the southern states under its control, a process essentially completed in 978, the Northern Han were able to hold out due to help from the Liao dynasty. In fact, the continued existence of the Northern Han was one of the two thorns in the side of Liao-Song relations. Finally, the Song dynasty was able to incorporate the Northern Han into its territory in 979, essentially completing the reunification of China, with the exception of the Sixteen Prefectures, which would remain in the hands of the Liao dynasty.

== Rulers ==
Temple names	Posthumous names	Personal names	Reign	Era names
Gāozǔ (高祖)	Emperor Ruìwén Shèngwǔ Zhāosù Xiào (睿文聖武昭肅孝皇帝)	Liu Zhiyuan (劉知遠)	947–948	Tiānfú (天福) 947; Qiányòu (乾祐) 948
None	Emperor Yǐn (隱皇帝)	Liu Chengyou (劉承祐)	948–951	Qiányòu (乾祐) 948–951

== Later Han and Northern Han emperors family tree ==
The family tree of the Later Han and Northern Han rulers

– Later Han emperors; – Northern Han emperors

adopted
Marriage
Liu Tian 劉琠; Xianzu 显祖
Liu Zhiyuan 劉知遠 895–948; Gaozu 高祖; 947–948	Liu Min 劉旻 895–954; Shizu 世祖; 951–954
Liu Chengyou 劉承祐 931–951; Yindi 隱帝; 948–951	Liu Yun 劉贇 d.951; r.950	Liu Jun 劉钧 926–968; Ruizong 睿宗; 954–968	Xue Zhao 薛钊	Lady Liu 劉氏	Mr. He 何某
Liu Jien 劉继恩 d. 968; Shaozhu 少主; 968	Liu Jiyuan 劉继元 d. 992; Yingwudi 英武帝; 968–979

== See also ==
- Monarchy of China
