= Guo Wei =

Emperor of Later Zhou from 951 to 954

Emperor Taizu of Later Zhou 後周太祖
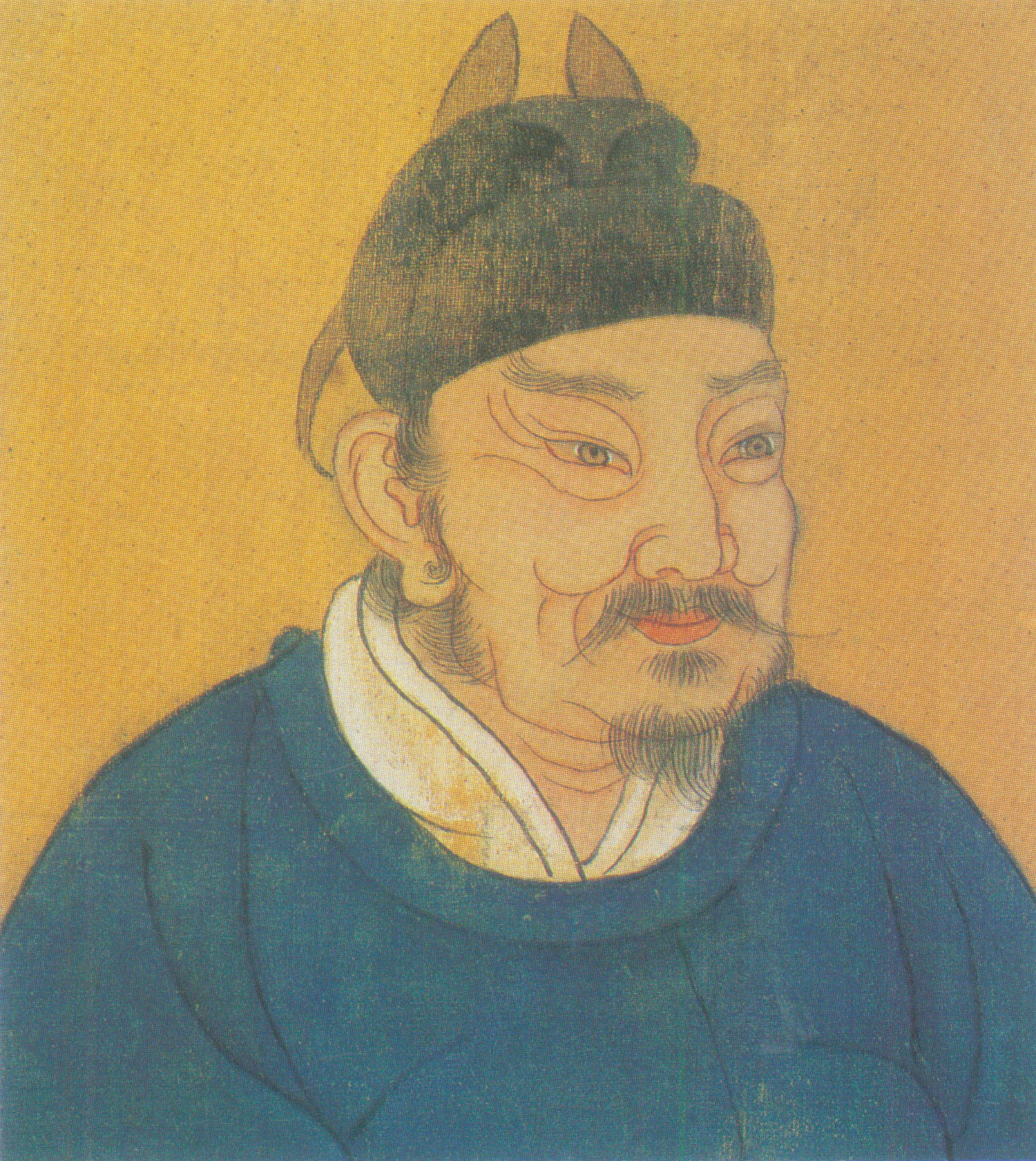

Emperor of the Later Zhou dynasty
- Reign: 11 February 951 – 22 February 954
- Successor: Chai Rong
- Born: 10 September 904; Yaoshan County, Xingzhou (modern Longyao County, Hebei, China)
- Died: 22 February 954 (aged 49); Kaifeng
- Burial: Song Mausoleum (嵩陵; in modern Xinzheng, Henan); 34°32′17.95″N 113°41′55.90″E
- Spouse: See § Family
- Issue: Chai Rong (adoptive son) others
Names
- Surname: Guō (郭); Given name: Wēi (威); Courtesy name: Wénzhòng (文仲)
Era dates
- Guǎngshùn (廣順), began on 13 February 951; Year 1: 9 February 951 – 29 January 952; Year 2: 30 January 952 – 17 January 953; Year 3: 18 January 953 – 5 February 954; Xiǎndé (顯德); Year 1: 6 February 954 – 26 January 955
Regnal name
- Emperor Shengming Wenwu Rende (聖明文武仁德皇帝)
Posthumous name
- Emperor Shèngshén Gōngsù Wénwǔ Xiào (聖神恭肅文武孝皇帝)
Temple name
- Tàizǔ (太祖; "Grand Progenitor")
- House: Guo
- Dynasty: Later Zhou
- Father: Guo Jian (郭簡)
- Mother: Lady Wang (王氏)

Guo Wei
- Chinese: 郭威
Transcriptions
Standard Mandarin
- Hanyu Pinyin: Guō Wēi
- Wade–Giles: Kuo^{1} Wei^{1}
Yue: Cantonese
- Jyutping: Gwok^{3} Wai^{1}
Southern Min
- Hokkien POJ: Kok Ui

Guo Wei (Chinese: 郭威) (10 September 904 – 22 February 954), also known by his temple name as the Emperor Taizu of Later Zhou (後周太祖), was the founding emperor of the Chinese Later Zhou dynasty during the Five Dynasties and Ten Kingdoms period, reigning from 951 until his death in 954.

Nicknamed "Sparrow Guo" (郭雀兒) after a sparrow-shaped tattoo on his neck, he rose to a high position in the Later Han as an assistant military commissioner. He founded the Later Zhou in 951.

== Early life ==
When Guo Wei was born in 904 in Yaoshan (堯山; in modern Longyao County, Hebei), the Tang dynasty had disintegrated into regions controlled by warlords fighting amongst one another. Guo was just a toddler when his family moved to Taiyuan (in modern Shanxi), as his father Guo Jian (郭簡) (Note: Guo Wei's biography in Old History of the Five Dynasties recorded that his birth father could be someone with the surname "Chang"; he changed his surname when his mother married his step-father.) became the prefect (刺史) of Shunzhou (順州, modern Shunyi District, Beijing), serving the Taiyuan-based warlord Li Keyong. Shortly afterwards, Guo Jian was killed by warlord Liu Rengong's forces which conquered Shunzhou, and before Guo Wei's deciduous teeth fell out, his mother Lady Wang (王氏) also died. Orphaned, the young boy was raised by a distant relative, Lady Han (韓氏).

Guo Wei grew up into a muscular young man interested more in warfare than agriculture. He was also fond of drinking and gambling, and frequently participated in brawls; his wife Lady Chai often advised him not to indulge in these activities. When he was around 17, to escape arrest, he went to live with an acquaintance Gentleman Chang (常氏) in Huguan close to Luzhou (潞州, modern Changzhi, Shanxi), shortly before joining the army of Luzhou's interim regent (留後) Li Jitao. Li Jitao was serving Jin, ruled by Li Keyong's son Li Cunxu, but actually plotting to defect to the Later Liang, Jin's archenemy. He was therefore more interested in recruiting brave and talented soldiers than enforcing the law, so when an inebriated Guo stabbed a menacing marketplace butcher to death following an argument, he let Guo walk free, eventually summoning Guo back to serve him.

== Career under Later Tang ==
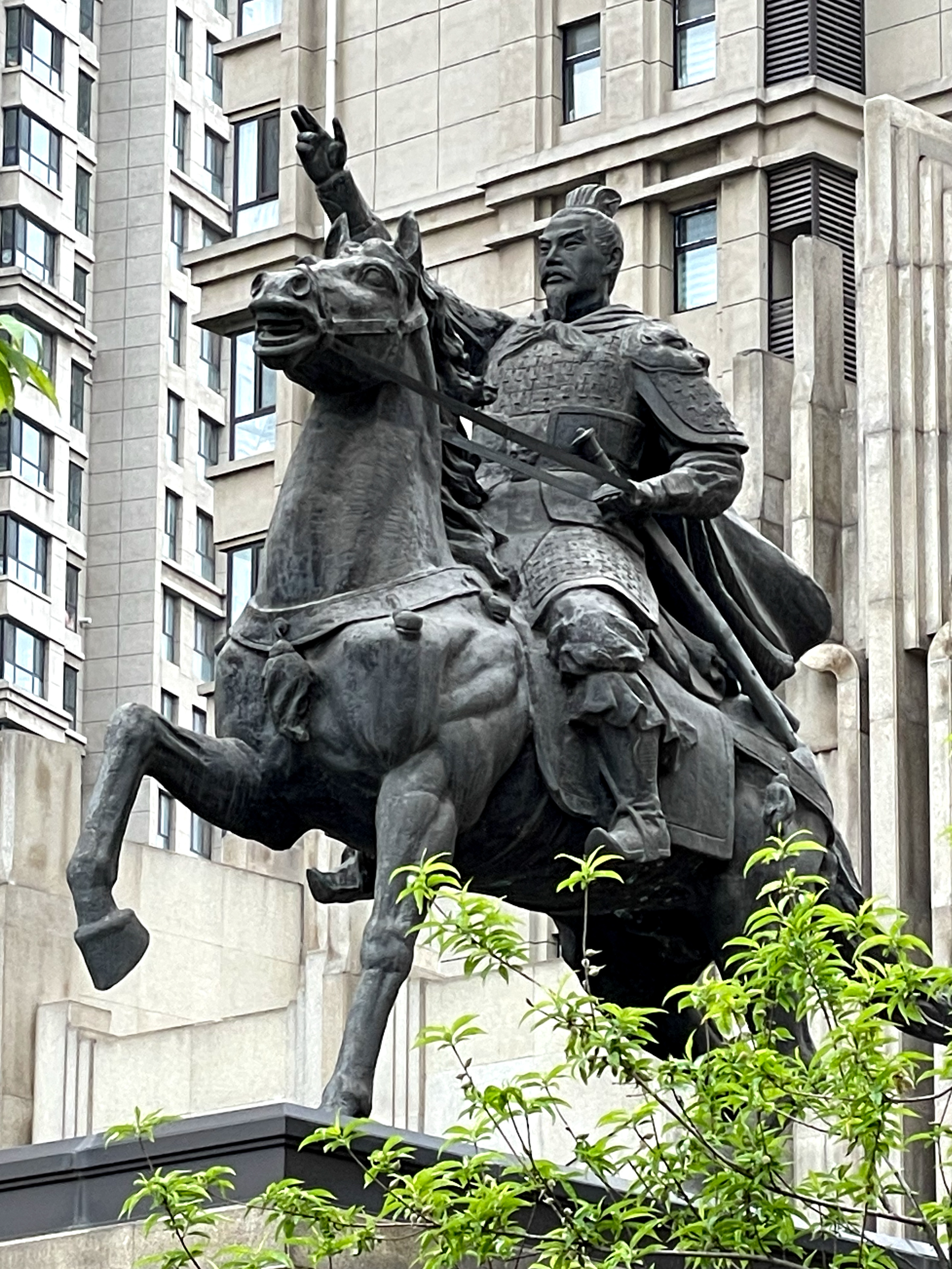
Statue of Guo Wei in Xingtai, Hebei

In 923, Li Cunxu established the Later Tang and overthrew Later Liang. Li Jitao was killed a few months later and all of his former soldiers, including 19-year-old Guo Wei, were assigned to the cavalry rotations. As Guo was literate and good at mathematics, he soon became an officer. He delved into the available literature on military strategy as much as he could, particularly enjoying Spring and Autumn Annals for a Wider World (閫外春秋), recommended by a blood brother Li Qiong (李瓊); Guo Wei also regarded Li Qiong as a teacher as he asked Li to explain to him parts of the Annals which he could not understand.

In 927, the Later Tang emperor Li Siyuan personally led an army to suppress Zhu Shouyin's rebellion. Guo Wei, then under the leadership of general Shi Jingtang, was among the first soldiers scaling the defensive wall of Xun (in modern Henan). Shi saw Guo's literary talents and tasked him to manage military records. Guo proved very popular among generals and ministers.

== Career under Later Jin ==
Later Tang was replaced by the Later Jin in 936.

== Career under Later Han ==
The Later Han was a Shatuo-led Chinese dynasty founded by Liu Zhiyuan, posthumously known as Emperor Gaozu of Later Han. Guo Wei was already familiar with life under the Shatuo people as he had lived under their rule since he was nineteen years old. He served as the Assistant Military Commissioner to Liu Zhiyuan. However, when the teenage Liu Chengyou assumed the Later Han throne in 948, court intrigue enabled Guo to usurp the throne in a coup and declare the establishment of the Later Zhou dynasty on New Year's Day in 951 (11 February in the modern calendar).

== Reign ==
He was the first Han Chinese Emperor in northern China since 923. His rule was stable, and he passed reforms that attempted to relieve pressures on China’s massive peasantry. His rule was vigorous and well-organized. However, he died from an illness three years into his reign in 954.

== Ancestry ==
Ancestors of Guo Wei, Emperor Taizu of Later Zhou

16. Guo Jing (郭璟)
8. Guo Chen (郭諶) (Note: Posthumously honored as Emperor Mingxian (明憲皇帝) with the temple name Xizu (僖祖).)
17. Lady Zhang (張氏)
4. Guo Yun (郭蘊) (Note: Posthumously honored as Emperor Yishun (翼順皇帝) with the temple name Yizu (義祖).)
9. Lady Shen (申氏) (Note: Posthumously honored as Empress Mingxiao (明孝皇后).)
2. Guo Jian (郭簡) (Note: Posthumously honored as Emperor Zhangsu (章肅皇帝) with the temple name Qingzu (慶祖).)
5. Lady Han (韓氏) (Note: Posthumously honored as Empress Yijing (翼敬皇后).)
1. Guo Wei
3. Lady Wang (王氏) (Note: Posthumously honored as Empress Zhangde (章德皇后).)

== Family ==
=== Consorts and issue ===
- Empress Shengmu, of the Chai clan (聖穆皇后 柴氏)
- Pure Consort, of the Yang clan (楊淑妃 楊氏; 911 – 947)
- Noble Consort, of the Zhang clan (張貴妃 張氏; 915 – 950)
- Virtuous Consort, of the Dong clan (董德妃 董氏; 915－953)
- Unknown
  - Unnamed Prince, 1st son
  - Guo Qingge, Prince of Shan (剡王 郭青哥, d. 24 December 950), 2nd son
  - Guo Yige (郭意哥, d. 24 December 950), 3rd son
  - Unnamed Princess, 1st daughter
  - Unnamed Princess, 2nd daughter
  - Princess Chang of Ju State (莒國長公主, d. 950), 3rd daughter
  - Princess Shou'an (壽安公主), 4th daughter
    - Married Zhang Yongde (張永德)
  - Princess Yongning (梁國長公主), 5th daughter

== Notes ==
Guo Wei House of Guo (951–960) Born: 904 Died: 954
Regnal titles
| Preceded by None (state founded) | Emperor of Later Zhou; 951–954 | Succeeded by Guo Rong (Emperor Shizong) |
| Preceded by Liu Chengyou of Later Han | Emperor of China (Central); 951–954 | Succeeded by Guo Rong (Emperor Shizong) |
| Preceded by Li Jing of Southern Tang | Emperor of China (Northwestern Hunan) (de jure); 951–954 | Succeeded by Guo Rong (Emperor Shizong) |
| Preceded by Li Jing of Southern Tang | Emperor of China (Southeastern Hunan) (de jure); 952–954 | Succeeded by Guo Rong (Emperor Shizong) |
