= October 24 =

October 24 this year in various calendars
- Saturday, 24 October 2026
Akan	Kwamemene
Armenian	6 Trē 1476
Aztec	Atlcahualo 2, 2 Cuāuhtli
Babylonian	11 Tashritu, 2337 SE
Balinese pawukon	Luang, Pepet, Beteng, Sri, Wage, Was, Saniscara of Dukut, Sri, Jangur, Duka
Bengali	8 Kartik, BS 1433
Chinese	Yin Metal Goat・Girl Mansion; Fire Horse Year, Month 9, Day 15 (Shuangjiang, 14 days until Lidong)
Common Era	24 October 2026 CE
Coptic	14 Paopi, AM 1743
Egyptian	11 Phamenoth, 2775 NE
Ethiopian	14 Ṭeqemt, 2019 Amätä Məhrät
French Republican	Décade I, Duodi de Brumaire de l'Année 235 de la République
Gregorian	24 October, AD 2026
Hebrew	13 Cheshvan, AM 5787
Hindu	Uttarabhādrapada・Vyāghāta; Solar: 7 Kārtika, 1948 SE; Lunisolar: Trayodaśī, Śukla pakṣa of Āśvina, 2083 VE; Rāudra・5127 KY・1,872,872
Icelandic	Laugardagur, 1 Gormánuður 2026
Islamic	12 Jumada al-awwal, AH 1448 (using tabular method)
ISO week date	2026-W43-6
Japanese	14 Nagatsuki, Reiwa 8 (Sōkō, 14 days until Rittō)
Julian	11 October, AD 2026 (AM 7535)
Julian day	2461338
Korean	14 Gaedal, 4359 DE
Maya	13.0.14.0.15; 8 Zac, 2 Men
Roman	ante diem V Idus Octobres, MMDCCLXXIX AUC
Solar Hijri	2 Aban, SH 1405
Tibetan	13 tha skar, me pho rta 2153 or 1772 or 1000

<<	October					>>
Su	Mo	Tu	We	Th	Fr	Sa
				1	2	3
4	5	6	7	8	9	10
11	12	13	14	15	16	17
18	19	20	21	22	23	24
25	26	27	28	29	30	31
2026

October 24 in recent years
2026 (Saturday)
2025 (Friday)
2024 (Thursday)
2023 (Tuesday)
2022 (Monday)
2021 (Sunday)
2020 (Saturday)
2019 (Thursday)
2018 (Wednesday)
2017 (Tuesday)

October 24 is the 297th day of the year (298th in leap years) in the Gregorian calendar; 68 days remain until the end of the year.

== Events ==
=== Pre-1600 ===
- AD 69 – In the Second Battle of Bedriacum, troops loyal to Vespasian defeat those of Emperor Vitellius.
- 1260 – Chartres Cathedral is dedicated in the presence of King Louis IX of France.
- 1260 – After defeating the Mongols at the Battle of Ain Jalut and assassinating the previous Mamluk sultan, Qutuz, Baybars ascends to the Egyptian throne as the fourth sultan of the Mamluk Sultanate.
- 1273 – Rudolf of Habsburg is crowned king of the Romans in Aachen.
- 1360 – The Treaty of Brétigny is ratified, marking the end of the first phase of the Hundred Years' War.
- 1590 – John White, the governor of the second Roanoke Colony, returns to England after an unsuccessful search for the "lost" colonists.
- 1596 – The second Spanish armada sets sail to strike against England, but is smashed by storms off Cape Finisterre forcing a retreat to port.

=== 1601–1900 ===
- 1641 – Felim O'Neill of Kinard, the leader of the Irish Rebellion, issues his Proclamation of Dungannon, justifying the uprising and declaring continued loyalty to King Charles I of England.
- 1648 – The Peace of Westphalia is signed, marking the end of the Thirty Years' War and the Eighty Years' War.
- 1795 – Poland is completely consumed by Russia, Prussia and Austria.
- 1812 – Napoleonic Wars: The Battle of Maloyaroslavets takes place near Moscow.
- 1813 – Treaty of Gulistan: The Russo-Persian War of 1804-1813 comes to a close with the signing of the Treaty of Gulistan, under which terms Qajar Iran agrees to cede the bulk of its Caucasian territories, which comprise much of modern Dagestan, Georgia, Armenia, and Azerbaijan, to the Russian Empire.
- 1851 – William Lassell discovers the moons Umbriel and Ariel orbiting Uranus.
- 1857 – Sheffield F.C., the world's oldest association football club still in operation, is founded in England.
- 1860 – Convention of Peking: The Second Opium War formally comes to a close, with Qing China ceding Kowloon in perpetuity to the victorious British Empire.
- 1861 – The first transcontinental telegraph line across the United States is completed.
- 1871 – An estimated 17 to 22 Chinese immigrants are lynched in Los Angeles, California.
- 1876 – Shinpūren rebellion: Upset at the Westernisation of Meiji Japan and the abolition of the Tokugawa feudal hierarchy, the Keishintō, a group of extremist Shinto former samurai, launch a surprise attack against the Meiji government in Kumamoto Prefecture.
- 1886 – Normanton incident: As the British merchant vessel Normanton sinks off the coast of Japan, her European officers appear to commandeer the ship's lifeboats for themselves, leaving her Asian crew and passengers to die and conjuring significant political outrage in Japan.
- 1889 – Henry Parkes delivers the Tenterfield Oration, effectively starting the federation process in Australia.
- 1894 – First Sino-Japanese War: Battle of Jiuliancheng: Under the command of General Yamagata Aritomo, the Imperial Japanese Army covertly crosses the Yalu River into Qing territory and launches an assault on the fortifications at Hushan.
- 1900 – U.S. Government announces plans to buy Danish West Indies for $7 million.

=== 1901–present ===
- 1901 – Annie Edson Taylor becomes the first person to go over Niagara Falls in a barrel.
- 1902 – Guatemala's Santa María volcano begins to erupt, becoming the third-largest eruption of the 20th century.
- 1911 – Orville Wright remains in the air for nine minutes and 45 seconds in a glider at Kill Devil Hills, North Carolina.
- 1912 – First Balkan War: The Battle of Kirk Kilisse concludes with a Bulgarian victory against the Ottoman Empire.
- 1912 – First Balkan War: The Battle of Kumanovo concludes with the Serbian victory against the Ottoman Empire.
- 1917 – World War I: Italy suffers a disastrous defeat at the Battle of Caporetto on the Austro-Italian front.
- 1918 – World War I: Italian victory in the Battle of Vittorio Veneto.
- 1926 – Harry Houdini's last performance takes place at the Garrick Theatre in Detroit.
- 1929 – "Black Thursday" on the New York Stock Exchange, the first day of the panic in the markets that contributes to the Great Depression.
- 1930 – A bloodless coup d'état in Brazil ends the First Republic, replacing it with the Vargas Era.
- 1931 – The George Washington Bridge opens to public traffic over the Hudson River.
- 1944 – World War II: Japan's center force is temporarily repulsed in the Battle of Leyte Gulf.
- 1944 – World War II: The USS Shark (SS-314) was lost with all 87 hands in the Bashi Straits after torpedoing the Japanese freighter Arisan Maru.
- 1944 – World War II: The USS Tang (SS-306) sank in the Formosa Strait after being struck by its own torpedo, with 78 of its crew lost.
- 1945 – The United Nations Charter comes into effect.
- 1946 – A camera on board the V-2 No. 13 rocket takes the first photograph of earth from outer space.
- 1947 – Famed animator Walt Disney testifies before the House Un-American Activities Committee, naming Disney employees he believes to be communists.
- 1947 – United Air Lines Flight 608 crashes in the Bryce Canyon National Park in Garfield County, Utah, while attempting an emergency landing at Bryce Canyon Airport, killing 52 people.
- 1949 – The cornerstone of the United Nations Headquarters is laid.
- 1950 – Annexation of Tibet by the People's Republic of China: The People's Liberation Army ceases all military operations in Tibet, ending the Battle of Chamdo.
- 1954 – US President Dwight D. Eisenhower pledges United States support to South Vietnam.
- 1957 – The United States Air Force starts the X-20 Dyna-Soar crewed space program.
- 1960 – Nedelin catastrophe: An R-16 ballistic missile explodes on the launch pad at the Soviet Union's Baikonur Cosmodrome space facility, killing over 100 people, including Field Marshal Mitrofan Nedelin.
- 1963 – An oxygen leak from an R-9 Desna missile at the Baikonur Cosmodrome triggers a fire that kills seven people.
- 1964 – Northern Rhodesia gains independence from the United Kingdom and becomes Zambia.
- 1975 – In Iceland, 90% of women take part in a national strike, refusing to work in protest of gender inequality.
- 1980 – The government of Poland legalizes the Solidarity trade union.
- 1986 – Nezar Hindawi is sentenced to 45 years in prison, the longest sentence handed down by a British court, for the attempted bombing of an El Al flight at Heathrow Airport.
- 1990 – Italian prime minister Giulio Andreotti reveals to the Italian parliament the existence of Gladio, the Italian NATO force formed in 1956, intended to be activated in the event of a Warsaw Pact invasion.
- 1992 – The Toronto Blue Jays become the first Major League Baseball team based outside the United States to win the World Series.
- 1998 – Deep Space 1 is launched to explore the asteroid belt and test new spacecraft technologies.
- 2003 – Concorde makes its last commercial flight.
- 2004 – Arsenal Football Club loses 2–0 to Manchester United in a match dubbed the Battle of the Buffet, ending their Premier League record 49-match unbeaten streak.
- 2005 – Hurricane Wilma makes landfall in Florida, resulting in 35 direct and 26 indirect fatalities and causing $20.6B USD in damage.
- 2007 – Chang'e 1, the first satellite in the Chinese Lunar Exploration Program, is launched from Xichang Satellite Launch Center.
- 2008 – "Bloody Friday" saw many of the world's stock exchanges experience the worst declines in their history, with drops of around 10% in most indices.
- 2014 – The China National Space Administration launches an experimental lunar mission, Chang'e 5-T1, which will loop behind the Moon and return to Earth.
- 2015 – A driver deliberately crashes into the Oklahoma State Homecoming parade, killing four people and injuring 34.
- 2016 – A French surveillance aircraft flying to Libya crashes on takeoff in Malta, killing all five people on board.
- 2016 – Three heavily armed terrorists from the Islamic State – Khorasan Province open fire on and eventually suicide bomb a police training centre in Balochistan, Pakistan, killing at least 59 cadets and injuring more than 165 others.
- 2018 – The world's longest sea crossing, the Hong Kong–Zhuhai–Macau Bridge, opens for public traffic.
- 2024 – A 14 year old resident from Bosanska Krupa, Bosnia and Herzegovina initiated a terrorist attack on the local police station, killing one police officer and injuring another.

== Births ==
=== Pre-1600 ===
- AD 51 – Domitian, Roman emperor (died 96)
- 1378 – David Stewart, Duke of Rothesay heir to the throne of Scotland (died 1402)
- 1503 – Isabella of Portugal (died 1539)
- 1561 – Anthony Babington, English conspirator (Babington Plot) (died 1586)

=== 1601–1900 ===
- 1632 – Antonie van Leeuwenhoek, Dutch biologist and microbiologist (died 1723)
- 1637 – Lorenzo Magalotti, Italian philosopher (died 1712)
- 1650 – Steven Blankaart, Dutch entomologist (died 1704)
- 1675 – Richard Temple, 1st Viscount Cobham, English field marshal and politician, Lord Lieutenant of Buckinghamshire (died 1749)
- 1713 – Marie Fel, French soprano and actress (died 1794)
- 1763 – Dorothea von Schlegel, German author and translator (died 1839)
- 1784 – Moses Montefiore, British philanthropist, sheriff and banker (died 1885)
- 1788 – Sarah Josepha Hale, American author and poet (died 1879)
- 1798 – Massimo d'Azeglio, Piedmontese-Italian statesman, novelist and painter (died 1866)
- 1804 – Wilhelm Eduard Weber, German physicist and academic (died 1891)
- 1811 – Ferdinand Hiller, German composer and conductor (died 1885)
- 1811 – Georg August Wallin, Finnish explorer, orientalist, and professor (died 1852)
- 1830 – Marianne North, English biologist and painter (died 1890)
- 1838 – Annie Edson Taylor, American stuntwoman and educator (died 1921)
- 1854 – Hendrik Willem Bakhuis Roozeboom, Dutch chemist and academic (died 1907)
- 1855 – James S. Sherman, American lawyer and politician, 27th Vice President of the United States (died 1912)
- 1857 – Ned Williamson, American baseball player (died 1894)
- 1868 – Alexandra David-Néel, Belgian-French explorer and author (died 1969)
- 1872 – Peter O'Connor, Irish long jumper (died 1957)
- 1873 – E. T. Whittaker, British mathematician and physicist (died 1956)
- 1875 – Konstantin Yuon, Russian painter and set designer (died 1958)
- 1876 – Saya San, Burmese monk and activist (died 1931)
- 1879 – B. A. Rolfe, American bandleader and producer (died 1956)
- 1882 – Sybil Thorndike, English actress (died 1976)
- 1884 – Emil Fjellström, Swedish actor (died 1944)
- 1885 – Alice Perry, Irish engineer and poet (died 1969)
- 1887 – Victoria Eugenie of Battenberg, Queen Consort of King Alfonso XIII of Spain (died 1969)
- 1887 – Octave Lapize, French cyclist and pilot (died 1917)
- 1891 – Rafael Trujillo, Dominican soldier and politician, 36th President of the Dominican Republic (died 1961)
- 1891 – Brenda Ueland, American journalist, author, and educator (died 1985)
- 1894 – Bibhutibhushan Mukhopadhyay, Indian author, poet, and playwright (died 1987)
- 1895 – Jack Warner, English actor and singer (died 1981)
- 1896 – Marjorie Joyner, American make-up artist and businesswoman (died 1994)
- 1898 – Peng Dehuai, Chinese general, 1st Minister of National Defense of the People's Republic of China (died 1974)
- 1899 – Teikō Shiotani, Japanese photographer (died 1988)

=== 1901–present ===
- 1901 – Gilda Gray, Polish-American actress, singer, and dancer (died 1959)
- 1903 – Melvin Purvis, American FBI agent (died 1960)
- 1904 – Moss Hart, American director and playwright (died 1961)
- 1904 – A.K. Golam Jilani, Bangladeshi activist (died 1932)
- 1905 – Fran Zwitter, Slovenian historian and academic (died 1988)
- 1906 – Alexander Gelfond, Russian mathematician and cryptographer (died 1968)
- 1907 – Patricia Griffin, Montserratian nurse and social worker (died 1986)
- 1908 – John Tuzo Wilson, Canadian geologist and geophysicist (died 1993)
- 1909 – Bill Carr, American runner (died 1966)
- 1909 – Thomas F. Connolly, American admiral (died 1996)
- 1910 – Stella Brooks, American singer (died 2002)
- 1910 – Gunter d'Alquen, German SS officer and journalist (died 1998)
- 1910 – Joe L. Evins, American lawyer and politician (died 1984)
- 1910 – James K. Woolnough, American general (died 1996)
- 1910 – Yoel Zussman, Polish-Israeli lawyer and judge (died 1982)
- 1911 – Paul Grégoire, Canadian cardinal (died 1993)
- 1911 – Clarence M. Kelley, American 2nd Director of the Federal Bureau of Investigation (died 1997)
- 1911 – Sonny Terry, American singer and harmonica player (died 1986)
- 1911 – Nathaniel Wyeth, American chemist and inventor (created PET plastic beverage bottle) (died 1990)
- 1912 – Silviu Bindea, Romanian footballer (died 1992)
- 1912 – Peter Gellhorn, German conductor (music) (died 2004)
- 1912 – Murray Golden, American television director (died 1991)
- 1913 – Tito Gobbi, Italian actor and singer (died 1984)
- 1914 – Charles Craig Cannon, American colonel (died 1992)
- 1914 – František Čapek, Czech canoeist (died 2008)
- 1914 – Lakshmi Sahgal, Indian Independence movement revolutionary and Officer of Indian National Army (died 2012)
- 1915 – Bob Kane, American author and illustrator (died 1998)
- 1915 – Marghanita Laski, English journalist and author (died 1988)
- 1916 – Anne Sharp, Scottish soprano and actress (died 2011)
- 1917 – Marie Foster, American activist (died 2003)
- 1918 – Doreen Tovey, English author (died 2008)
- 1919 – Frank Piasecki, American engineer and pilot (died 2008)
- 1920 – Marcel-Paul Schützenberger, French mathematician and academic (died 1996)
- 1921 – Ted Ditchburn, English footballer and manager (died 2005)
- 1921 – R. K. Laxman, Indian illustrator (died 2015)
- 1922 – George Miller, American educator and politician, Mayor of Tucson (died 2014)
- 1923 – Robin Day, English lieutenant and journalist (died 2000)
- 1923 – Denise Levertov, British-born American poet (died 1997)
- 1924 – John Brereton Barlow, South African cardiologist and physician (died 2008)
- 1924 – Mary Lee, American actress and singer (died 1996)
- 1924 – Fuat Sezgin, Turkish historian and academic (died 2018)
- 1925 – Luciano Berio, Italian composer and educator (died 2003)
- 1925 – Al Feldstein, American author and illustrator (died 2014)
- 1925 – Willie Mabon, American-French singer-songwriter and pianist (died 1985)
- 1925 – Ken Mackay, Australian cricketer (died 1982)
- 1925 – Ieng Sary, Vietnamese-Cambodian politician co-founded the Khmer Rouge (died 2013)
- 1925 – Paul Vaughan, English journalist and radio host (died 2014)
- 1926 – Rafael Azcona, Spanish author and screenwriter (died 2008)
- 1926 – Y. A. Tittle, American football player (died 2017)
- 1927 – Gilbert Bécaud, French singer-songwriter, pianist, and actor (died 2001)
- 1927 – Jean-Claude Pascal, French actor and singer (died 1992)
- 1927 – Barbara Robinson, American author and poet (died 2013)
- 1928 – George Bullard, American baseball player (died 2002)
- 1929 – Hubert Aquin, Canadian activist, author, and director (died 1977)
- 1929 – George Crumb, American composer and educator (died 2022)
- 1929 – Rachel Douglas-Home, 27th Baroness Dacre, English wife of William Douglas-Home (died 2012)
- 1929 – Yordan Radichkov, Bulgarian author and playwright (died 2004)
- 1929 – Sos Sargsyan, Armenian actor (died 2013)
- 1930 – Jack Angel, American voice actor (died 2021)
- 1930 – The Big Bopper, American singer-songwriter and guitarist (died 1959)
- 1930 – Elaine Feinstein, English poet, author, and playwright (died 2019)
- 1930 – Johan Galtung, Norwegian sociologist and mathematician (died 2024)
- 1930 – James Scott Douglas, English-born Scottish race car driver and 6th Baronet Douglas (died 1969)
- 1930 – Ahmad Shah of Pahang (died 2019)
- 1931 – Sofia Gubaidulina, Russian-German pianist and composer (died 2025)
- 1931 – Ken Utsui, Japanese actor (died 2014)
- 1932 – Stephen Covey, American author and educator (died 2012)
- 1932 – Pierre-Gilles de Gennes, French physicist and academic, Nobel Prize laureate (died 2007)
- 1932 – Adrian Mitchell, English journalist, author, poet, and playwright (died 2008)
- 1932 – Robert Mundell, Canadian economist and academic, Nobel Prize laureate (died 2021)
- 1933 – Reginald Kray, English gangster (died 2000)
- 1933 – Ronald Kray, English gangster (died 1995)
- 1933 – Norman Rush, American author and educator
- 1934 – John G. Cramer, American physicist and author
- 1934 – Glen Glenn, American singer-songwriter and guitarist (died 2022)
- 1934 – Margie Masters, Australian golfer (died 2022)
- 1934 – Sammy Petrillo, American actor (died 2009)
- 1934 – Sanger D. Shafer, American singer-songwriter (died 2019)
- 1935 – Malcolm Bilson, American pianist, musicologist, and educator
- 1935 – Antonino Calderone, Italian mobster (died 2013)
- 1935 – Mark Tully, Indian-English journalist and author
- 1936 – Jüri Arrak, Estonian painter (died 2022)
- 1936 – Jimmy Dawkins, American singer and guitarist (died 2013)
- 1936 – David Nelson, American actor, director, and producer (died 2011)
- 1936 – Bill Wyman, English singer-songwriter, bass player, and producer
- 1937 – Miguel Ángel Coria, Spanish composer and educator (died 2016)
- 1937 – Santo Farina, American guitarist and songwriter
- 1937 – John Goetz, American baseball player (died 2008)
- 1937 – Heribert Offermanns, German chemist and academic
- 1937 – M. Rosaria Piomelli, Italian-American architect and academic
- 1937 – Petar Stipetić, Croatian general (died 2018)
- 1938 – Stephen Resnick, American economist and academic (died 2013)
- 1939 – F. Murray Abraham, American actor
- 1940 – Martin Campbell, New Zealand director and producer
- 1940 – Rafał Piszcz, Polish canoe racer (died 2012)
- 1940 – David Sainsbury, Baron Sainsbury of Turville, English businessman and academic
- 1940 – Yossi Sarid, Israeli politician (died 2015)
- 1941 – William H. Dobelle, American medical researcher (died 2004)
- 1941 – Peter Takeo Okada, Japanese archbishop (died 2020)
- 1941 – Merle Woo, Asian American activist
- 1942 – Stephen R. Bloom, English physician and academic
- 1942 – Maggie Blye, American actress (died 2016)
- 1942 – Frank Delaney, Irish journalist and author (died 2017)
- 1942 – Rafael Cordero Santiago, Puerto Rican politician, 132nd Mayor of Ponce (died 2004)
- 1942 – Fernando Vallejo, Colombian biologist and author
- 1943 – Bill Dundee, Scottish-American wrestler and manager
- 1943 – Phil Hawthorne, Australian rugby player and coach (died 1994)
- 1944 – Viktor Prokopenko, Ukrainian footballer and manager (died 2007)
- 1944 – Bettye Swann, American singer-songwriter
- 1944 – Ted Templeman, American musician and record producer (Doobie Brothers; Van Morrison; Van Halen)
- 1945 – Gérald Larose, Canadian educator and union leader
- 1946 – Jerry Edmonton, Canadian drummer (died 1993)
- 1947 – Kevin Kline, American actor and singer
- 1948 – Phil Bennett, Welsh rugby player (died 2022)
- 1948 – Kweisi Mfume, American lawyer and politician
- 1949 – John Markoff, American journalist and author
- 1949 – Keith Rowley, Trinidadian volcanologist and politician, 7th Prime Minister of Trinidad and Tobago
- 1950 – Iggy Arroyo, Filipino lawyer and politician (died 2012)
- 1950 – Pablove Black, Jamaican singer-songwriter, keyboard player, and producer
- 1950 – Miguel Ángel Pichetto, Argentinian lawyer and politician
- 1950 – Miroslav Sládek, Czech politician
- 1950 – Gabriella Sica, Italian poet and author
- 1950 – Maria Teschler-Nicola, Austrian biologist, anthropologist, and ethnologist
- 1951 – George Tsontakis, American composer and conductor
- 1952 – Keith Bain, Canadian educator and politician
- 1952 – Francesco Camaldo, Italian priest
- 1952 – Ángel Torres, Dominican baseball player
- 1953 – Christoph Daum, German footballer and manager (died 2024)
- 1954 – Doug Davidson, American actor
- 1954 – Tom Mulcair, Canadian lawyer and politician
- 1954 – Jožo Ráž, Slovak singer-songwriter and bass player
- 1954 – Mike Rounds, American businessman and politician
- 1954 – Brad Sherman, American accountant, lawyer, and politician
- 1954 – Malcolm Turnbull, Australian journalist and politician, 29th Prime Minister of Australia
- 1955 – Cheryl Studer, American soprano and actress
- 1956 – Jeff Merkley, American businessman and politician
- 1957 – Ron Gardenhire, German-American baseball player and manager
- 1957 – John Kassir, American actor and voice actor
- 1959 – Dominique Baert, French lawyer and politician
- 1959 – Gunnar Bakke, Norwegian banker and politician, 65th Mayor of Bergen
- 1959 – Chihiro Fujioka, Japanese director and composer
- 1959 – Michelle Lujan Grisham, American lawyer and politician
- 1959 – Rowland S. Howard, Australian guitarist and songwriter (died 2009)
- 1959 – Denis Troch, French footballer and manager
- 1959 – Annette Vilhelmsen, Danish educator and politician, Danish Minister of Social Affairs
- 1960 – Ian Baker-Finch, Australian golfer and sportscaster
- 1960 – Jaime Garzón, Colombian journalist, lawyer, and activist (died 1999)
- 1960 – Joachim Winkelhock, German race car driver
- 1960 – BD Wong, American actor
- 1961 – Mary Bono, American gymnast and politician
- 1961 – Bruce Castor, American lawyer and politician
- 1962 – Yves Bertucci, French footballer and manager
- 1962 – Ian Dalziel, English footballer and manager
- 1962 – Jonathan Davies, Welsh rugby player and television host
- 1962 – Debbie Googe, English bass player and songwriter
- 1962 – Andrea Horwath, Canadian politician
- 1962 – Gibby Mbasela, Zambian footballer (died 2000)
- 1963 – Mark Grant, American baseball player and sportscaster
- 1963 – John Hendrie, Scottish footballer and manager
- 1963 – Rosana Arbelo, Spanish singer-songwriter and guitarist
- 1964 – Linda Ballantyne, Canadian voice actress
- 1964 – Paul Bonwick, Canadian businessman and politician
- 1964 – Dmitri Gorkov, Russian footballer and manager
- 1964 – Janele Hyer-Spencer, American lawyer and politician
- 1964 – Ray LeBlanc, American ice hockey player
- 1964 – Doug Lee, American basketball player
- 1965 – Kyriakos Velopoulos, German-Greek journalist and politician
- 1966 – Roman Abramovich, Russian businessman and politician
- 1966 – Simon Danczuk, English academic and politician
- 1966 – Zahn McClarnon, American actor
- 1967 – Ian Bishop, Trinidadian cricketer and sportscaster
- 1967 – Olo Brown, Samoan-New Zealand rugby player
- 1967 – Jacqueline McKenzie, Australian actress
- 1967 – Esther McVey, English television host and politician
- 1968 – Francisco Clavet, Spanish tennis player
- 1968 – Mark Walton, American voice actor and illustrator
- 1968 – Robert Wilonsky, American journalist and critic
- 1969 – Emma Donoghue, Irish-Canadian author
- 1969 – Arthur Rhodes, American baseball player
- 1970 – Rob Leslie-Carter, English field hockey player and engineer
- 1970 – Jeff Mangum, American singer-songwriter and guitarist
- 1971 – Aaron Bailey, American football player
- 1971 – Gustavo Jorge, Argentina international rugby union player
- 1971 – Zephyr Teachout, American academic
- 1971 – Diane Guthrie-Gresham, Jamaican track and field athlete
- 1971 – Caprice Bourret, American model and actress
- 1972 – Pat Williams, American football player and coach
- 1972 – Jeremy Wright, English lawyer and politician, Attorney General for England and Wales
- 1973 – Meelis Friedenthal, Estonian author and academic
- 1973 – Kurt Kuenne, American filmmaker
- 1973 – Levi Leipheimer, American cyclist
- 1973 – Madlib, American DJ, record producer, and rapper
- 1973 – Jackie McNamara, Scottish footballer and manager
- 1973 – Laura Veirs, American singer-songwriter and guitarist
- 1973 – Jeff Wilson, New Zealand rugby player, cricketer, and radio host
- 1974 – Gábor Babos, Hungarian footballer
- 1974 – Kalen DeBoer, American football coach
- 1974 – Corey Dillon, American football player
- 1974 – Wilton Guerrero, Dominican baseball player and scout
- 1974 – Jamal Mayers, Canadian ice hockey player and sportscaster
- 1975 – Juan Pablo Ángel, Colombian footballer
- 1975 – Frank Seator, Liberian footballer (died 2013)
- 1976 – Matteo Mazzantini, Italian rugby player
- 1976 – Petar Stoychev, Bulgarian swimmer
- 1977 – Iván Kaviedes, Ecuadoran footballer
- 1978 – Carlos Edwards, Trinidadian footballer
- 1978 – James Hopes, Australian cricketer
- 1978 – Ann Christin von Allwörden, German politician
- 1979 – Ben Gillies, Australian drummer and songwriter
- 1979 – Marijonas Petravičius, Lithuanian basketball player
- 1980 – Matthew Amoah, Ghanaian footballer
- 1980 – Kerrin McEvoy, Australian jockey
- 1980 – Monica, American singer-songwriter, producer, and actress
- 1980 – Anna Montañana, Spanish basketball player
- 1980 – Zac Posen, American fashion designer
- 1980 – Christian Vander, German footballer
- 1980 – Casey Wilson, American actress and screenwriter
- 1981 – Kemal Aslan, Turkish footballer
- 1981 – Sebastián Bueno, Argentinian footballer
- 1981 – Fredrik Mikkelsen, Norwegian guitarist and composer
- 1981 – Tila Tequila, Singaporean-American model, actress, and singer
- 1981 – Alfred Vargas, Filipino actor and politician
- 1982 – Fairuz Fauzy, Malaysian race car driver
- 1982 – Macay McBride, American baseball player
- 1983 – Adrienne Bailon, American singer-songwriter, dancer, and actress
- 1983 – Chris Colabello, American baseball player
- 1983 – Hernán Garin, Argentinian footballer
- 1983 – Michael Gordon, Australian rugby league player
- 1983 – Brian Vickers, American race car driver
- 1984 – Lougee Basabas, Filipino singer-songwriter
- 1984 – Jonas Gustavsson, Swedish ice hockey player
- 1984 – Kaela Kimura, Japanese singer-songwriter
- 1985 – Robert Cornthwaite, English-Australian footballer
- 1985 – Tim Pocock, Australian actor
- 1985 – Matthew Robinson, Australian snowboarder (died 2014)
- 1985 – Wayne Rooney, English footballer
- 1985 – Oscar Wendt, Swedish footballer
- 1986 – Drake, Canadian rapper and actor
- 1986 – Oliver Jackson-Cohen, English actor
- 1986 – John Ruddy, English footballer
- 1987 – Jeremy Evans, American basketball player
- 1987 – Chris Hogan, American football player
- 1987 – Anthony Vanden Borre, Belgian footballer
- 1987 – Charlie White, American figure skater
- 1988 – Mitch Inman, Australian rugby player
- 1988 – Christopher Linke, German race walker
- 1988 – Demont Mitchell, Bahamian footballer
- 1988 – Tarek Hamed, Egyptian footballer
- 1989 – David Castañeda, American actor
- 1989 – Anderson Conceição, Brazilian footballer
- 1989 – Shenae Grimes, Canadian actress
- 1989 – Eric Hosmer, American baseball player
- 1989 – PewDiePie, Swedish YouTuber
- 1989 – Eliza Taylor, Australian actress
- 1990 – Elijah Greer, American middle-distance runner
- 1990 – İlkay Gündoğan, German footballer
- 1990 – Mohammed Jahfali, Saudi Arabia international footballer
- 1990 – Danilo Petrucci, Italian motorcycle racer
- 1990 – Nikola Vučević, Montenegrin basketball player
- 1991 – Torstein Andersen Aase, Norwegian footballer
- 1991 – Bojan Dubljević, Montenegrin basketball player
- 1992 – Marrion Gopez, Filipino actor, singer, and dancer
- 1992 – Ding Liren, Chinese chess grandmaster
- 1993 – R. J. Hunter, American basketball player
- 1994 – Krystal Jung, American-South Korean singer, dancer, and actress
- 1994 – Tereza Martincová, Czech tennis player
- 1994 – Sean O'Malley, American mixed martial artist
- 1994 – Jalen Ramsey, American football player
- 1995 – Vincent Leuluai, Australian rugby league player
- 1995 – Ashton Sanders, American actor
- 1996 – Jaylen Brown, American basketball player
- 1996 – Rafael Devers, Dominican baseball player
- 1996 – Océane Dodin, French tennis player
- 1996 – Garrison Mathews, American basketball player
- 1996 – Kyla Ross, American gymnast
- 1997 – Bron Breakker, American wrestler
- 1997 – Claudia Fragapane, English gymnast
- 1997 – Raye, British singer-songwriter
- 1998 – Daya, American singer
- 1999 – Amon-Ra St. Brown, American football player
- 2008 – Liamani, American singer and actress

== Deaths ==
=== Pre-1600 ===
- 935 – Li Yu, Chinese official and chancellor
- 996 – Hugh Capet, French king
- 1152 – Jocelin of Soissons, French theologian, philosopher and composer
- 1168 – Count William IV of Nevers, French nobleman
- 1260 – Qutuz, Egyptian sultan
- 1375 – Valdemar IV, Danish king (born 1320)
- 1537 – Jane Seymour, English queen and wife of Henry VIII (born c. 1508)
- 1572 – Edward Stanley, 3rd Earl of Derby, English admiral and politician, Lord Lieutenant of Lancashire (born 1508)

=== 1601–1900 ===
- 1601 – Tycho Brahe, Danish astronomer and alchemist (born 1546)
- 1633 – Jean Titelouze, French organist and composer (born 1562/3)
- 1642 – Robert Bertie, 1st Earl of Lindsey, English peer and courtier (born 1582)
- 1655 – Pierre Gassendi, French priest, astronomer, and mathematician (born 1592)
- 1669 – William Prynne, English lawyer and author (born 1600)
- 1672 – John Webb, English architect and scholar (born 1611)
- 1725 – Alessandro Scarlatti, Italian composer and educator (born 1660)
- 1770 – William Bartram, American scientist and politician (born 1711)
- 1799 – Carl Ditters von Dittersdorf, Austrian violinist and composer (born 1739)
- 1821 – Elias Boudinot, American lawyer and politician, 10th President of the Continental Congress (born 1740)
- 1824 – Israel Bissell, American patriot post rider during American Revolutionary War (born 1752)
- 1852 – Daniel Webster, American lawyer and politician, 14th United States Secretary of State (born 1782)
- 1875 – Raffaello Carboni, Italian-Australian author and poet (born 1817)
- 1898 – Pierre Puvis de Chavannes, French painter and illustrator (born 1824)

=== 1901–present ===
- 1915 – Désiré Charnay, French archaeologist and photographer (born 1828)
- 1917 – James Carroll Beckwith, American painter and academic (born 1852)
- 1922 – George Cadbury, English businessman (born 1839)
- 1935 – Dutch Schultz, American mob boss (born 1902)
- 1937 – Nils Wahlbom, Swedish actor (born 1886)
- 1938 – Ernst Barlach, German sculptor and playwright (born 1870)
- 1943 – Hector de Saint-Denys Garneau, Canadian poet and painter (born 1912)
- 1944 – Louis Renault, French engineer and businessman, co-founded the Renault Company (born 1877)
- 1945 – Vidkun Quisling, Norwegian soldier and politician, Minister President of Norway (born 1887)
- 1948 – Franz Lehár, Austrian-Hungarian composer (born 1870)
- 1948 – Frederic L. Paxson, American historian and author (born 1877)
- 1949 – Yaroslav Halan, Ukrainian playwright and publicist (born 1902)
- 1958 – G. E. Moore, English philosopher and academic (born 1873)
- 1960 – Yevgeny Ostashev, the test pilot of rocket, participant in the launch of the first artificial Earth satellite, Lenin Prize winner, Candidate of Technical Sciences (born 1924)
- 1964 – Toni Kinshofer, German mountaineer (born 1931)
- 1965 – Hans Meerwein, German chemist (born 1879)
- 1966 – Sofya Yanovskaya, Russian mathematician and historian (born 1896)
- 1969 – Behçet Kemal Çağlar, Turkish poet and politician (born 1908)
- 1970 – Richard Hofstadter, American historian and author (born 1916)
- 1971 – Carl Ruggles, American composer (born 1876)
- 1971 – Jo Siffert, Swiss race car driver and motorcycle racer (born 1936)
- 1971 – Chuck Hughes, NFL player died during a game (born 1943)
- 1972 – Jackie Robinson, American baseball player and sportscaster (born 1919)
- 1972 – Claire Windsor, American actress (born 1892)
- 1974 – David Oistrakh, Ukrainian violinist (born 1908)
- 1975 – İsmail Erez, Turkish lawyer and diplomat, Turkish Ambassador to France (born 1919)
- 1975 – Zdzisław Żygulski, Polish historian, author, and academic (born 1888)
- 1979 – Carlo Abarth, Italian automobile designer and founded of Abarth (born 1908)
- 1983 – Jiang Wen-Ye, Taiwanese composer and educator (born 1910)
- 1985 – Richie Evans, American race car driver (born 1941)
- 1985 – Maurice Roy, Canadian cardinal (born 1905)
- 1989 – Jerzy Kukuczka, Polish mountaineer (born 1948)
- 1991 – Gene Roddenberry, American captain, screenwriter, and producer, created Star Trek (born 1921)
- 1991 – Ismat Chughtai, Indian author and screenwriter (born 1915)
- 1992 – Laurie Colwin, American novelist and short story writer (born 1944)
- 1993 – Heinz Kubsch, German footballer (born 1930)
- 1993 – Bahrija Nuri Hadžić, Bosnian opera singer (born 1904)
- 1994 – Yannis Hotzeas, Greek theoretician and author (born 1930)
- 1994 – Raul Julia, Puerto Rican-American actor and singer (born 1940)
- 1997 – Don Messick, American voice actor and singer (born 1926)
- 1999 – Berthe Qvistgaard, Danish actress (born 1910)
- 2001 – Kathleen Ankers, American actress and set designer (born 1919)
- 2001 – Wolf Rüdiger Hess, German author and critic (born 1937)
- 2001 – Jaromil Jireš, Czech director and screenwriter (born 1935)
- 2002 – Winton M. Blount, American soldier and politician, 59th United States Postmaster General (born 1921)
- 2002 – Hernán Gaviria, Colombian footballer (born 1969)
- 2002 – Harry Hay, English-American activist, co-founded the Mattachine Society and Radical Faeries (born 1912)
- 2002 – Peggy Moran, American actress and singer (born 1918)
- 2004 – Randy Dorton, American engineer (born 1954)
- 2004 – Ricky Hendrick, American race car driver and businessman (born 1980)
- 2004 – James Aloysius Hickey, American cardinal (born 1920)
- 2004 – Maaja Ranniku, Estonian chess player (born 1941)
- 2005 – Joy Clements, American soprano and actress (born 1932)
- 2005 – José Azcona del Hoyo, Honduran businessman and politician, President of Honduras (born 1926)
- 2005 – Mokarrameh Ghanbari, Iranian painter (born 1928)
- 2005 – Immanuel C. Y. Hsu, Chinese sinologist and scholar (born 1923)
- 2005 – Rosa Parks, American civil rights activist (born 1913)
- 2005 – Robert Sloman, English actor and screenwriter (born 1926)
- 2006 – Enolia McMillan, American educator and activist (born 1904)
- 2006 – William Montgomery Watt, Scottish historian and scholar (born 1909)
- 2007 – Petr Eben, Czech organist and composer (born 1929)
- 2007 – Ian Middleton, New Zealand author (born 1928)
- 2007 – Alisher Saipov, Kyrgyzstan journalist (born 1981)
- 2007 – Anne Weale, English journalist and author (born 1929)
- 2008 – Moshe Cotel, American pianist and composer (born 1943)
- 2010 – Mike Esposito, American author and illustrator (born 1927)
- 2010 – Lamont Johnson, American actor, director, and producer (born 1922)
- 2010 – Joseph Stein, American author and playwright (born 1912)
- 2011 – Sansan Chien, Taiwanese composer and educator (born 1967)
- 2011 – John McCarthy, American computer scientist and academic, developed the Lisp programming language (born 1927)
- 2012 – Peggy Ahern, American actress (born 1917)
- 2012 – Anita Björk, Swedish actress (born 1923)
- 2012 – Jeff Blatnick, American wrestler and sportscaster (born 1957)
- 2012 – Bill Dees, American singer-songwriter and guitarist (born 1939)
- 2012 – Margaret Osborne duPont, American tennis player (born 1918)
- 2013 – Antonia Bird, English director and producer (born 1951)
- 2013 – Brooke Greenberg, American girl with a rare genetic disorder (born 1993)
- 2013 – Ana Bertha Lepe, Mexican model and actress (born 1934)
- 2013 – Lew Mayne, American football player and coach (born 1920)
- 2014 – Mbulaeni Mulaudzi, South African runner (born 1980)
- 2014 – S. S. Rajendran, Indian actor, director, and producer (born 1928)
- 2014 – Marcia Strassman, American actress and singer (born 1948)
- 2015 – Michael Beetham, English commander and pilot (born 1923)
- 2015 – Alvin Bronstein, American lawyer and academic (born 1928)
- 2015 – Margarita Khemlin, Ukrainian-Russian author and critic (born 1960)
- 2015 – Ján Chryzostom Korec, Slovak cardinal (born 1924)
- 2015 – Maureen O'Hara, Irish-American actress and singer (born 1920)
- 2016 – Bobby Vee, American pop singer (born 1943)
- 2016 – Jorge Batlle Ibáñez, Uruguayan politician, 38th president of Uruguay (born 1927)
- 2017 – Fats Domino, American pianist and singer-songwriter (born 1928)
- 2017 – Robert Guillaume, American actor (born 1927)
- 2017 – Girija Devi, Indian classical singer (born 1929)
- 2018 – Tony Joe White, American singer/songwriter (born 1943)
- 2021 – James Michael Tyler, American actor (born 1962)
- 2022 – Leslie Jordan, American actor, writer, and singer (born 1955)
- 2024 – Amir Abdur-Rahim, American basketball player and coach (born 1981)
- 2024 – Abdelaziz Barrada, Moroccan footballer (born 1989)
- 2024 – Jeri Taylor, American screenwriter (born 1938)
- 2025 – Sirikit, Queen Mother of Thailand (born 1932)

== Holidays and observances ==
- Christian feast day:
  - Anthony Mary Claret
  - Arethas of Najran
  - Eberigisil (Evergitus)
  - Blessed Giuseppe Baldo
  - Luigi Guanella
  - Magloire of Dol
  - Martin of Vertou
  - Proclus of Constantinople
  - Senoch
  - October 24 (Eastern Orthodox liturgics)
- Food Day (United States)
- International Day of Diplomats
- United Nations Day, the anniversary of the 1945 Charter of the United Nations (International)
- World Development Information Day
- World Polio Day
