= Yao Yi =

Yao Yi (姚顗) (866 – November 8, 940), courtesy name Bozhen (伯真) (per the Old History of the Five Dynasties) or Baizhen (百真) (per the New History of the Five Dynasties), was an official of the Chinese Five Dynasties and Ten Kingdoms period states Later Liang, Later Tang, and Later Jin, serving as a chancellor during the reign of Later Tang's final emperor Li Congke.

== Background ==
Yao Yi was born in 866, during the reign of Emperor Yizong of Tang. He was from the Tang dynasty capital Chang'an. His great-grandfather Yao Xiqi (姚希奇) served as an advisor to a prefectural prefect; his grandfather Yao Hongqing (姚宏慶) served as a prefectural prefect; and his father Yao Jing (姚荊) served as a principal of the imperial university. Yao Yi himself was described as unintelligent, but magnanimous, in his youth. He did not pay attention to his appearance. As a result, people did not respect him, except for the hermit Sikong Tu (司空圖), who had previously served an official in the imperial administration, and Sikong gave a daughter to him in marriage. It was said that Yao was kind and trusting, such that his household servants and concubines were easily able to cheat him of money. While he would realize this, he did not rebuke them in person. He also was a poor handler of money, not understanding its value well, so he did not accumulate any wealth.

Late in Tang, Yao followed the people in moving to the eastern capital Luoyang. (This was probably a reference to the forced relocation of the imperial court from Chang'an to Luoyang when the major warlord Zhu Quanzhong the military governor (Jiedushi) of Xuanwu Circuit (宣武, headquartered in modern Kaifeng, Henan) forced Emperor Yizong's son Emperor Zhaozong to move the capital there, to put Emperor Zhaozong under firmer control; if so, it would be in 904.) The next year, Yao passed the imperial examinations in the Jinshi class, although if he carried any offices during these final years of Tang's existence, it was not recorded in history.

== During Later Liang ==
Zhu Quanzhong subsequently forced Emperor Zhaozong's son and successor Emperor Ai to yield the throne to him, ending Tang and establishing Later Liang. During the Zhenming era (915–921) of Zhu Quanzhong's son and successor Zhu Zhen, Yao served successively in a number of offices, progressively higher—Xiaoshu Lang (校書郎), a copyeditor at the Palace Library; magistrate of Dengfeng County (登封, in modern Zhengzhou, Henan); You Bujue (右補闕), a low-level consultant at the legislative bureau (中書省, Zhongshu Sheng); Libu Yuanwailang (禮部員外郎), a low-level official at the ministry of rites (禮部, Libu); then the dual offices of imperial scholar (翰林學士, Hanlin Xueshi) and Zhongshu Sheren (中書舍人), a mid-level official at the legislative bureau.

== During Later Tang ==
In 923, Later Liang's rival Later Tang's emperor Li Cunxu, who claimed to be the legitimate successor to Tang and viewed Later Liang as an illegitimate usurper state, launched a surprise attack on the Later Liang capital Daliang, capturing it. Zhu Zhen committed suicide, ending Later Liang and allowing Later Tang to take over its territory. Li Cunxu believed that a number of Later Liang officials from aristocratic families, who served Later Liang despite their families' long allegiance to the Tang state, should be exiled for what he viewed as disloyalty. Yao Yi was one of the ones targeted, and he was exiled to Fu Prefecture (復州, in modern Tianmen, Hubei) to serve as the military advisor to its prefect. However, he was recalled from exile after about a year, and, in 926, during the reign of Li Cunxu's adoptive brother and successor Li Siyuan, he was made Zuo Sanqi Changshi (左散騎常侍), a high-level consultant at the examination bureau (門下省, Menxia Sheng). Subsequently, he served successively as deputy minister of defense (兵部侍郎, Bingbu Shilang), deputy minister of civil service affairs (吏部侍郎, Libu Shilang), and Shangshu Zuo Cheng (尚書左丞), one of the secretaries general of the executive bureau (尚書省, Shangshu Sheng).

In 934, Li Siyuan's adoptive son Li Congke became emperor (after overthrowing Li Siyuan's biological son Li Conghou). At that time, the leading chancellors were Liu Xu and Li Yu, but they were often arguing with each other and not getting much done in terms of governance. Li Congke was not happy about this situation and considered replacing them. When he consulted with his close associates, they recommended Yao, Lu Wenji, and Cui Jujian (崔居儉). Because Yao, Lu, and Cui each had their strengths and weaknesses, Li Congke could not decide on whom to commission. He therefore wrote their names on pieces of paper and placed the paper in a crystal bottle. After offering incense to heaven, he used chopsticks to take the paper out of the bottle. Lu's name was taken out first, followed by Yao. He therefore commissioned Lu and Yi as chancellors (with Lu's commission coming first). In the commission, Yi received the titles of Zhongshu Shilang (中書侍郎, deputy head of the legislative bureau) and the chancellor designation Tong Zhongshu Menxia Pingzhangshi (同中書門下平章事).

It was said that Yao was not a capable chancellor. One example was his involvement in the selection of officials for civil service. The old Tang system was that the ministry of civil service affairs (吏部, Libu) would select officials in three stages, with the minister of civil service affairs handling one stage and each of the two deputy ministers handling one stage; an official would only be commissioned after going through the three stages. Late in Li Siyuan's reign, then-chancellor Feng Dao advocated merging the three stages into one—arguing that, at that time, the Later Tang realm was no longer as large in territory or population as the unified Tang, such that only several hundred officials were to be selected each year, and that the three-stage selection process was time-wasting and inefficient. Li Siyuan thus merged the three stages into one, and have the minister and deputy ministers of civil service affairs select officials together. When Yao and Lu became chancellors, they again divided the process into three stages, such that it became drawn out again. The candidates were stuck with nothing to do during the selection process, and they often tried to intercept chancellors in public to complain. Yao did nothing about it, and Li Congke had to intercede himself and abolish the three-stage process again.

== During Later Jin ==
In 936, Li Congke was overthrown by his brother-in-law Shi Jingtang, who established Later Jin. Shi removed Yao Yi from his chancellor position and made him the minister of justice (刑部尚書, Xingbu Shangshu). He was shortly after made the minister of census (戶部尚書, Hubu Shangshu) instead. He died in 940 and was given posthumous honors. Because he was so ill-equipped to manage his money affairs, at the time of his death, his family did not even have sufficient funds to hold a proper funeral for him. They had to first pawn their possessions and sell the mansion in order to do so. It was said that the intelligentsia praised him for his honesty but blamed him for his foolishness.

== Notes and references ==
- Old History of the Five Dynasties, vol. 92.
- New History of the Five Dynasties, vol. 55.
- Zizhi Tongjian, vols. 272, 279, 280.
