= Liu Xu =

Liu Xu (Chinese: 劉昫; 888–947), courtesy name Yaoyuan (耀遠), formally the Duke of Qiao (譙公), was a Chinese historian and politician of the Chinese Five Dynasties and Ten Kingdoms period states Later Tang and Later Jin, serving as a chancellor during both of those short-lived dynasties. He was the lead editor of the Old Book of Tang, one of the official histories of the preceding Tang dynasty, completed during Later Jin, although most of the work was probably completed during the term of his predecessor Zhao Ying.

== Background ==
Liu Xu was born in 887, during the reign of Emperor Xizong of Tang. His family was from Zhuo Prefecture (涿州, in modern Baoding, Hebei). His grandfather Liu Cheng (劉乘) and father Liu Yin (劉因) both served as officers at You Prefecture (幽州, in modern Beijing).

It was said that in his youth, Liu Xu was known for his handsome appearance and his literary abilities, and both his older brother Liu Xuan (rendered 劉晅 in the History of the Five Dynasties and 劉暄 in the New History of the Five Dynasties) and younger brother Liu Hao (劉皞) were known in their home territory. Sometime during the Tianyou era (904-907), there was a time when forces of the Khitan captured Zhuo, and Liu Xu was captured and taken to Xin Prefecture (新州, in modern Zhangjiakou, Hebei), but he escaped his Khitan captors. He later took up residence at Mount Daning (大寧山), living with Lü Mengqi (呂夢奇) (later a Later Tang official as well) and Zhang Lin (張麟), spending the time reciting and writing poems.

At one point, Wang Chuzhi, then ruling Yiwu Circuit (義武, headquartered in modern Baoding) as its military governor (Jiedushi), commissioned his adoptive son Wang Du as the prefect of Yi Prefecture (易州, in modern Baoding). Wang Du invited Liu to serve on his staff as his secretary in military matters. Later, after Wang Du completed his term as the prefect of Yi — probably at the time that Wang Chuzhi commissioned Wang Du as the deputy military governor of Yiwu — Liu requested to leave governmental service. Instead, Wang Du invited him to go to Yiwu's capital Zhongshan (中山) with Wang Du. At that time, Liu Xu's older brother Liu Xuan also arrived from Zhuo, and Wang Du recommended both of them to his father Wang Chuzhi. Wang Chuzhi commissioned Liu Xu as his secretary in headquarter matters, and shortly after promoted to him to be the secretary in Wang Chuzhi's role as governor (觀察使, Guanchashi).

About two years later, in 921, Wang Du seized control of the circuit from his father Wang Chuzhi in a coup. As one of Wang Du's close associates, He Shaowei (和少微), had previous disputes with Liu Xuan, he made false accusations against Liu Xuan, and Wang Du killed Liu Xuan. Liu Xu fled the circuit, and took up residence at Cang Prefecture (滄州, in modern Cangzhou, Hebei), in Jin territory. The military governor of Henghai Circuit (橫海, headquartered at Cang Prefecture), Li Cunshen, invited him to serve as secretary.

== During Later Tang ==
=== During Li Cunxu's reign ===
After Li Cunshen's lord and adoptive brother Li Cunxu the Prince of Jin claimed the title of emperor (of a new Later Tang) in 923, he made Liu Xu a Taichang Boshi (太常博士), a scholar at the ministry of worship (太常寺, Taichang Si), and shortly after an imperial scholar (翰林學士, Hanlin Xueshi). He was also made Shanbu Yuanwailang (膳部員外郎), a low-level official at the ministry of rites (禮部, Libu), and later promoted to be Bibu Langzhong (比部郎中), a supervisory official at the ministry of justice (刑部, Xingbu). He later left governmental service for some time when his mother died, to observe a period of mourning. After the period was complete, he was made Kubu Langzhong (庫部郎中), a supervisory official at the ministry of defense (兵部, Bingbu), and also resumed his role as imperial scholar.

=== During Li Siyuan's reign ===
Li Cunxu was killed in a mutiny in 926, and his adoptive brother Li Siyuan became emperor. After Li Siyuan became emperor, Liu Xu was made a Zhongshu Sheren (中書舍人), a mid-level official at the legislative bureau of government (中書省, Zhongshu Sheng); he later also assumed the posts of deputy minister of census (戶部侍郎, Hubu Shilang) and scholar at Duanming Hall (端明殿). It was said that Li Siyuan respected him for his gracefulness and favored him for his mild disposition.

In 933, Liu was given the titles of Zhongshu Shilang (中書侍郎, deputy head of the legislative bureau) and Tong Zhongshu Menxia Pingzhangshi (同中書門下平章事), making him a chancellor; he was also made the minister of justice (刑部尚書, Xingbu Shangshu).

=== After Li Siyuan's reign ===
Li Siyuan died in 933, and was initially succeeded by his son Li Conghou the Prince of Song. However, in 934, Li Conghou's chiefs of staff (Shumishi) Zhu Hongzhao and Feng Yun, not wanting his older adoptive brother Li Congke the Prince of Lu and his brother-in-law Shi Jingtang to become too entrenched at their circuits, transferred them both, causing Li Congke to rebel in fear at his military command at Fengxiang Circuit (鳳翔, headquartered in modern Baoji, Shaanxi), believing that they were targeting him for elimination. Li Congke quickly defeated the imperial forces sent against him, and thereafter headed for the imperial capital Luoyang. As he approached Luoyang, Li Conghou fled Luoyang in panic, while Zhu committed suicide and Feng was killed by the imperial guard general An Congjin. An thereafter requested that the three chancellors — Liu Xu and his colleagues Feng Dao and Li Yu — lead the civilian officials in welcoming Li Congke. The three chancellors conferred with each other and initially were unsure what to do, but with An rushing them, agreed to welcome Li Congke, who subsequently entered Luoyang and claimed the throne. (He subsequently sent emissaries to kill Li Conghou.)

After Li Congke took the throne, he put Liu in charge of the three financial agencies (taxation, treasury, and salt and iron monopolies), after the official Wang Mei (王玫), whom he initially put in charge of the three agencies, was found to inflate the amount of treasury reserves. He was also given the additional titles of minister of civil service affairs (吏部尚書, Libu Shangshu) and Menxia Shilang (門下侍郎, deputy head of the examination bureau (門下省, Menxia Sheng)). Shortly after, Feng Dao, one of whose children had married one of Liu's children, was sent out of the capital to serve as the military governor of Kuangguo Circuit (匡國, headquartered in modern Weinan, Shaanxi), leaving Liu and Li Yu serving as chancellors. Without Feng to moderate them, they quickly developed frequent arguments, as Liu was said to be critical and paying attention to details, while Li Yu was said to be strong-willed, particularly because when they discussed what changes might be necessary, Li Yu would satirize Liu and Feng's children's marital relationship by stating, "This was the doing of your wise marital relations. Is it not right to change it?" With them in frequent disputes, not much was being done at the office of the chancellors, causing much aggravation for Li Congke. Li Congke thus made Lu Wenji an additional chancellor.

Meanwhile, after Liu took over the three financial agencies from Wang, he had his secretary Gao Yanshang (高延賞) carefully go through the records to see how much money the treasury actually still had. He discovered that much of the purported treasury reserves were in fact uncollectible debts that the administrators kept on the books to use as excuses to harshly collect from the people. Liu reported this to Li Congke and advocated a two-pronged approach — that the government make all efforts to collect the collectible debts but forgive the uncollectible ones. Li Congke's chief of staff Han Zhaoyin concurred in this, and Li Congke issued an edict forgiving much of the debts that were accumulated from before Li Siyuan's Changxing era (930-933). The poor were very thankful, but the administrators at the three agencies resented Liu for this reform. When, shortly after, Liu and Li Yu were removed from their chancellor posts, with Liu being made You Pushe (右僕射) and no longer in charge of the three agencies, the administrators were all celebrating, and none of them accompanied Liu on his journey back to his mansion, as was customary.

== During Later Jin ==
=== During Shi Jingtang's reign ===
In 936, Shi Jingtang rebelled against Li Congke at Hedong Circuit (河東, headquartered in modern Taiyuan, Shanxi) and, with support from Khitan Empire's Emperor Taizong, overthrew Li Congke, ending Later Tang and starting his own Later Jin. However, for quite some time, his realm was not pacified, and in 937, when the major general Fan Yanguang rose against Shi at Tianxion Circuit (天雄, headquartered in modern Handan, Hebei), the general Zhang Congbin (張從賓) rose at Luoyang (which was no longer capital at that point — Kaifeng was) in support of Fan and killed Shi's sons Shi Chongxin (石重信) the military governor of Heyang Circuit (河陽, headquartered in modern Jiaozuo, Henan) and Shi Chong'ai (石重乂) the acting defender of Luoyang, whom Shi Jingtang left in charge of the region. After Zhang's rebellion was suppressed shortly after, Shi Jingtang made Liu Xu the defender of Luoyang and the acting mayor of Henan Municipality (河南, i.e., the Luoyang region), and soon thereafter put him back in charge of the directorate of salt and iron monopolies.

In 938, when Shi was offering grand honorable titles to Emperor Taizong (who might have changed the name of his state from Khitan to Liao by that point) and Emperor Taizong's mother Empress Dowager Shulü, he sent Feng Dao and Liu to Khitan to do so, with Feng in charge of offering the honors to Empress Dowager Shulü and Liu in charge of offering the honors to Emperor Taizong. Upon their return, Liu was given the titles of Taizi Taibao (太子太保) and Zuo Pushe (左僕射), and created the Duke of Qiao. (His Taizi Taibao title was shortly after changed to Taizi Taifu (太子太傅).)

=== During Shi Chonggui's reign ===
In 944, by which time Shi Jingtang had died and been succeeded by his nephew Shi Chonggui — at which time Later Jin was constantly at war with Liao due to Shi Chonggui's defiance toward Liao — Liu Xu was again made Menxia Shilang and chancellor, as well as Sikong (司空). He was also put in charge of editing the imperial history and directing the three financial agencies. In 945, it was therefore he and the historian Zhang Zhaoyuan (張昭遠) who presented the newly completed Old Book of Tang to Shi Chonggui, and were rewarded for the work. (However, Zhao Ying, who had served as chancellor during Shi Jingtang's reign, appeared to have begun the work with five other historians, including Zhang, in or shortly before 941.) Also in 945, when Shi Chonggui's close associates Feng Yu (the brother of Shi Chonggui's wife Empress Feng) and Li Yangtao (李彥韜) were repeatedly defaming the chancellor-chief of staff Sang Weihan, Shi considered removing Sang from his posts, but at the urging of Liu and fellow chancellor Li Song, did not do so, although he made Feng Yu a chief of staff as well to divide Sang's authorities.

== After Later Jin's fall ==
In 946, after Shi Chonggui sent the generals Du Wei and Li Shouzhen to attack Liao, Liao's Emperor Taizong counterattacked, surrounding Du and Li and getting them to surrender to him. He then attacked south toward Kaifeng, which was left undefended. Shi surrendered, ending Later Jin. Emperor Taizong thereafter, in early 947, declared himself the emperor of China as well. For sometime, Liu and the other Later Jin chancellors remained chancellor, but Liu shortly after requested to resign based on an eye ailment. He was allowed to do so, and was given the title of Taibao. When Emperor Taizong withdrew from Kaifeng later that year, he took many of the high-level former Later Jin officials with him, but Liu was allowed to remain at Kaifeng due to his ailment. He died in the summer of 947. After the Later Jin general Liu Zhiyuan subsequently claimed the title of emperor of a new Later Han, he posthumously honored Liu.

== Notes and references ==
- History of the Five Dynasties, vol. 89.
- New History of the Five Dynasties, vol. 55.
- Zizhi Tongjian, vols. 278, 279, 281, 284, 286, 287.
