= Li Yu (Later Tang) =

Li Yu (李愚) (died October 24, 935?), courtesy name Zihui (子晦), known in his youth as Li Yanping (李晏平), was a Chinese essayist, historian, and politician of the Five Dynasties and Ten Kingdoms period states Later Liang and Later Tang, serving as a chancellor during Later Tang.

== During Tang dynasty ==
It is not known when Li Yu was born. His family claimed ancestry from the prominent Li clan of Zhao Commandery (趙郡)—specifically, from the western branch of the Zhao Commandery Lis, and had been scholars for generations prior to him. His father Li Zhanye (李瞻業) had submitted himself for imperial examinations in the Jinshi class but was unable to pass them. When disturbances swept the territory of the Tang dynasty, then, he took refuge in Wudi (無棣, in modern Binzhou, Shandong) and settled there, teaching his children and grandchildren with the Classic of Poetry and Book of Documents. Li Yu was apparently born in Wudi, as he was said to be from there.

Li Yu was said to be solemn and careful beyond his years even when he was a child, and after he grew up, he became studious in both the Confucian classics and history. As he admired the Spring and Autumn period statesman Yan Ying, he initially named himself Li Yanping (as Yan had the posthumous name of Ping). His writing was in a style that emphasized integrity, taking on attributes of the writings of Han Yu and Liu Zongyuan. He came to emphasize, for himself, proper conduct and careful speech.

At one point, because he was then poor, Li tried to obtain an acting commission as an official. Lu Yanwei, who was then the military governor of Yichang Circuit (義昌, headquartered in modern Cangzhou, Hebei), commissioned him as a county secretary at Anling County (安陵—modern location not completely clear, but part of Jing Prefecture (景州), whose seat was also in modern Cangzhou). He subsequently left his service under Lu when his mother died, to observe a mourning period, and took this as an opportunity to leave the region to try to head to the capital Chang'an, apparently with the intent of sitting for imperial examinations. However, as the Tang court was then under severe turmoil, the imperial examinations were cancelled for several years, and he ended up as a traveler in the region between Hezhong Municipality (河中, in modern Yuncheng, Shanxi) and Hua Prefecture (華州, in modern Weinan, Shaanxi).

Around the new year 901, then-reigning Emperor Zhaozong of Tang was removed from the throne in a coup by powerful eunuchs, led by Liu Jishu and Wang Zhongxian (王仲先), who declared Emperor Zhaozong's son Li Zhen (not same person) emperor. Li submitted a petition to Han Jian the military governor of Zhenguo Circuit (鎮國, headquartered at Hua Prefecture), urging him to launch an army to try to rescue and restore the deposed emperor. Han, while not accepting his proposal, was impressed by his writing and treated him well, intending to retain him on staff, but Li declined and left.

At a later time—by which time Emperor Zhaozong had been restored, but then was forcibly seized eunuchs led by Han Quanhui and Zhang Yanhong (張彥弘) to the territory of their ally Li Maozhen the military governor of Fengxiang Circuit (鳳翔, headquartered in modern Baoji, Shaanxi), precipitating an attack by Zhu Quanzhong the military governor of Xuanwu Circuit (宣武, headquartered in modern Kaifeng, Henan) on the region—Li Yu, in order to flee this turmoil, went to take up residence at the eastern capital Luoyang. At that time, Li Yangu (李延古) the grandson of the statesman Li Deyu was living at his grandfather's old mansion, and Li Yu took refuge with him. Li Yu's own family members personally cut wood in order to support the household, and they did not depend on others for support. The year that the official Xue Tinggui (薛廷珪) was in charge of the imperial examinations, Li Yu sat for the examinations and passed in the Jinshi class, as well as a special examination for grand speech. He was made a military advisor at Henan Municipality (河南, i.e., the Luoyang region), and thereafter took up residence at a country mansion on the Luo River.

Around 905—by which point Zhu had not only captured Emperor Zhaozong, forced him to move the capital to Luoyang, but further had assassinated Emperor Zhaozong and made Emperor Zhaozong's son Emperor Ai emperor, and then was having further designs on the throne—Zhu's chancellor ally Liu Can was, pursuant to Zhu's wishes, carrying out slaughters against established Tang aristocratic families. Li Yu, in fear of this trend, fled north of the Yellow River and became a traveler in the region, along with his clansman Li Yanguang (李延光).

== During Later Liang ==
Zhu Quanzhong seized the throne in 907, establishing Later Liang. Later, his son Zhu Zhen was emperor, and Zhu Zhen favored scholars. By that point, Li Yanguang was serving as a teacher inside the palace, and he often spoke to the emperor of Li Yu's virtues and knowledge. Zhu Zhen thus summoned Li Yu in or about 916, and, impressed with Li Yu. He initially made Li Yu Zuo Shiyi (左拾遺), a consultant at the examination bureau of government (門下省, Menxia Sheng), and later a scholar serving under the emperor's chief of staff (崇政使, Chongzhengshi). He had Li Yu participate in policy decisions. Li Yu was also successively given posts as Shangbu Yuanwailang (膳部員外郎) and then Sixun Yuanwailang (司勛員外郎). During this time that Li Yu served under the chief of staff, an imperial examinee, Zhang Li (張礪), came to depend on him.

However, Li was also said to be so strict in his behavior that he ran afoul of powerful people (as he refused to placate them), including the emperor himself. For example, Zhu Youliang (朱友諒) the Prince of Heng, an older cousin of the emperor's, was so honored at court at that time that even Li Yu's superior, the chief of staff Li Zhen, kneeled to him. However, Li Yu refused to do so, and would only give the prince a lengthy bow. This apparently offended Zhu Youliang, and when Zhu Zhen heard of this, he summoned Li Yu, rebuking him, "The Prince of Heng is an older brother to me. I would have to kneel to him. Is it appropriate for you to only bow to him?" Li responded, "As a family member, Your Imperial Majesty may kneel to the Prince of Heng. Li Zhen and the others were also kneeling to him because they had served as household staff members. I had no such experience with the Prince, and I did not dare to bend my knees to him." There was also a time when Hua Wenqi (華溫琪) the military governor of Dingchang Circuit (定昌, headquartered in modern Linfen, Shanxi) was accused of illegally seizing a man's wealth. The man's family appealed to the imperial court, and Hua, after being indicted, confessed. Zhu Zhen, thinking back of the services that Hua had rendered to Zhu Quanzhong, did not want to punish Hua, but Li Yu insisted on continuing to prosecute Hua. Zhu eventually issued an edict rebuking Hua but not carrying out substantive punishment, other than ordering the return of the seized wealth. During the middle of Zhu Zhen's Zhenming era (915-921), there was a time when a servant of the official Li Xiao (李霄) battered another person to death. Li Xiao was faulted for the death (apparently of failure to properly supervise his servant). Li Yu argued on Li Xiao's behalf, pointing that Li Xiao was not involved in the incident and that the servant's crime should not be faulted to him. This displeased Zhu, who removed Li Yu from his imperial government posts and sent him out to Xuanhua Circuit (宣化, headquartered in modern Nanyang, Henan), to serve as the circuit governor's secretary. Also around this time, Zhang, who had previously depended on Li Yu, defected to Later Liang's archrival to the north, Jin, and became a secretary under Jin's prince Li Cunxu. During the time that Zhang associated with other Jin officials, he often praised Li Yu, particularly citing specific essays that Li Yu had written, causing the officials at the Jin court to be impressed with Li Yu.

== During Later Tang ==
=== During Li Cunxu's reign ===
In 923, Li Cunxu declared himself the emperor of a new Later Tang. He soon thereafter launched a surprise attack on the Later Liang capital Daliang, catching it defenseless; Zhu Zhen, believing that he could not save himself, committed suicide as the city fell, ending Later Liang. Li Cunxu shortly after established the capital of his new dynasty at Luoyang. Then-military governor of Xuanhua sent Li Yu, with a petition submitting to Later Tang rule, to Luoyang. The Later Tang officials, who had previously heard about Li Yu from Zhang Li, welcomed him. Shortly after, he was made Zhuke Langzhong (主客郎中), a supervisory official at the ministry of rites (禮部, Libu). Several months later, he was made an imperial scholar (翰林學士, Hanlin Xueshi).

In 925, Li Cunxu launched a major attack on Later Tang's southwestern neighbor Former Shu, putting his son Li Jiji the Prince of Wei in titular command of the operations but with his chief of staff Guo Chongtao in actual command. Li Yu volunteered for duty on this campaign, and he and Ren Huan were made chief strategists on Guo's staff. On the campaign, Later Tang's army ran into initial difficulties with terrain, but Li Yu advocated quick advancement, as he believed that Former Shu's emperor Wang Zongyan had lost the faith of his subjects due to his frivolous rule, and a quick advancement will cause Former Shu's morale to collapse. Guo agreed with him and ordered quick advancement. On the campaign, Li Yu was also in charge of military correspondences. After the Later Tang army conquered Former Shu later in 925, Li Yu, for his contributions, was given the additional office of Zhongshu Sheren (中書舍人), a mid-level official at the legislative bureau (中書省, Zhongshu Sheng).

=== During Li Siyuan's reign ===
However, after the victory, Li Cunxu and his wife Empress Liu came to suspect Guo Chongtao of planning rebellion, and they ordered the deaths of Guo and Guo's ally, the major general Zhu Youqian—which in turn precipitated mutinies across the empire, eventually resulting in Li Cunxu's death in a mutiny at Luoyang itself in 926. Li Jiji tried to take his army and return to Luoyang to take over imperial government, but with his own soldiers deserting him, committed suicide. Li Cunxu's adoptive brother Li Siyuan, who had previously rebelled against Li Cunxu himself, arrived at Luoyang and declared himself emperor.

Ren Huan became a chancellor in Li Siyuan's new administration. As he admired Li Yu, he repeatedly recommended Li Yu as a chancellor as well to Li Siyuan's powerful chief of staff An Chonghui. However, An's ally Kong Xun was then trying to plant his allies in the administration, and at Kong's recommendation, Cui Xie was made a chancellor instead of Li Yu. Shortly after, Li Yu was put in charge of the imperial examinations, and at a later point made both the deputy minister of defense (兵部侍郎, Bingbu Shilang) and chief imperial scholar (翰林學士承旨, Hanlin Xueshi Chengzhi). Early in Li Siyuan's Changxing era (930-933), Li Yu was removed from those posts and given the largely ceremonial post of minister of worship (太常卿, Taichang Qing). However, shortly after, then-chancellor Zhao Feng was removed from his chancellor post, and Li Yu was made Zhongshu Shilang (中書侍郎, deputy head of the examination bureau) and given the designation Tong Zhongshu Menxia Pingzhangshi (同中書門下平章事), making him a chancellor, replacing Zhao. He was also later given the additional title of grand scholar at Jixian Hall (集賢殿).

It was said that late in Li Siyuan's reign, his son Li Congrong the Prince of Qin dominated the court scene and was often violent to officials, causing them to be unwilling to make policy proposals. Li Yu was one of the few who did dare to speak up, but was not finding many who were willing to publicly support him. Later, while remaining chancellor, he was made Menxia Shilang (門下侍郎, the deputy head of the examination bureau) as well as minister of civil service affairs (吏部尚書, Libu Shangshu); he was also put in charge of editing the imperial histories. During this time, he gathered a group of scholars and created a 30-volume collection of the biographies of those who contributed to Later Tang's founding. As chancellor, he was said to be not spending effort on managing his own property, and he did not have a mansion; rather, he stayed at a government pavilion as a guest resident. Once, when he was ill, Li Siyuan sent messengers to attend to him, and the messengers informed Li Siyuan of the poor living conditions that Li Yu was in. Li Siyuan responded by awarding him with high quality blankets and bed screens.

=== During Li Conghou's and Li Congke's reigns ===
Li Siyuan died in 933 and was succeeded by his son Li Conghou the Prince of Song. (Li Congrong had earlier tried to forcibly seize power when Li Siyuan was seriously ill, believing that he needed to preemptively act against the high-level officials to avoid being bypassed for succession, but was defeated and killed.) Li Yu remained chancellor. Meanwhile, Li Conghou was said to be kind but irresolute. Li Yu commented to his colleagues, "Our Lord rarely visits us for advice. Even though we are in honorable positions, we should be concerned." The other chancellors did not dare to respond to him.

In 934, then-chiefs of staff to Li Conghou, Zhu Hongzhao and Feng Yun, came to suspect Li Conghou's brother-in-law Shi Jingtang the military governor of Hedong Circuit (河東, headquartered in modern Taiyuan, Shanxi) and did not want Shi to remain long at Hedong and also wanted to recall their ally, the powerful eunuch Meng Hanqiong, who was then serving as the acting military governor of Tianxiong Circuit (天雄, headquartered in modern Handan, Hebei), to the imperial government. They thus issued a series of orders transferring Fan Yanguang the military governor of Chengde Circuit (成德, headquartered in modern Shijiazhuang, Hebei) to Tianxiong, Shi from Hedong to Chengde, and Li Conghou's adoptive brother Li Congke the military governor of Fengxiang Circuit (鳳翔, headquartered in modern Baoji, Shaanxi) to Hedong. However, Li Congke thought that these transfers were targeting him, and therefore rebelled. He prevailed over the imperial forces sent against him and headed toward Luoyang. Li Conghou fled Luoyang. Li Yu and his chancellor colleagues Feng Dao and Liu Xu were set to greet the arriving Li Congke. Feng asked their subordinate Lu Dao (盧導), then serving as Zhongshu Sheren, to draft a petition to Li Congke asking him to take the throne. Lu pointed out that it was disloyal to, upon Li Conghou's flight, immediately ask someone else to take the throne. When Feng insisted, Li Yu sided with Lu, stating, "The Sheren's words were quite correct. Our faults are greater than the number of hairs on our heads." Feng thus did not press the point at that time (although eventually all of the officials, presumably including Li Yu, did petition Li Congke to take the throne, and Li Congke, after initially rebuking them, did so after Li Siyuan's wife Empress Dowager Cao issued an edict deposing Li Conghou and making Li Congke emperor). Li Conghou was eventually forced to commit suicide.

Shortly after Li Congke took the throne, Feng was removed from his chancellor post, leaving Li Yu and Liu as chancellors. However, they quickly were embroiled in conflicts with each other, as, as chancellors, they were both said to be insistent on their opinions and unwilling to compromise, particularly because Li Yu often made fun of Feng's actions and then used to make fun of Liu (as one of Feng's children married one of Liu's children, and they were closely aligned). Li Congke was much apprehensive of his chancellors' conflicts with each other, as they were causing the imperial administration to grind to a halt. He thus named Lu Wenji and Yao Yi as chancellors, and then removed both Li Yu and Liu from their chancellor posts, leaving both of them as Pushe (僕射, heads of the executive bureau (尚書省, Shangshu Sheng))—highly honored positions lacking substantial powers by this point. The fall of the following year (935), Li Yu became seriously ill and requested retirement, but Li Congke declined his offer to retire. He died shortly after, while still serving as Pushe.

== Notes and references ==
- History of the Five Dynasties, vol. 67.
- New History of the Five Dynasties, vol. 54.
- Zizhi Tongjian, vols. 262, 269, 273, 277, 278, 279.
