= Zhao Ying =

Chinese chancellor (885-951)

Zhao Ying (Chinese: 趙瑩; 885 – June 8, 951), courtesy name Yuanhui (元輝), was a Chinese historian, military general, and politician of the Chinese Five Dynasties and Ten Kingdoms period Later Tang and Later Jin states, serving as a chancellor during Later Jin.

== Background ==
Zhao Ying was born in 885, during the reign of Emperor Xizong of Tang. His family was from Huayin (華陰, in modern Weinan, Shaanxi). His great-grandfather Zhao Pu (趙溥) and grandfather Zhao Ru (趙孺) each had minor official careers — Zhao Pu reached the office of county secretary general, albeit of a major county (Jiangdu (江都, in modern Yangzhou, Jiangsu)) and Zhao Ru reached the office of Zhengzi (正字), an assistant copyeditor at the Palace Library. Zhao Ying's father Zhao Juhui (趙居晦) was a farmer, probably at the ancestral home at Huayin.

Zhao Ying himself was said to be handsome and careful. During the middle of the Longde era (921–923) of the Tang dynasty's successor state Later Liang dynasty, Zhao Ying entered official service, as a secretary to the Later Liang general Kang Yanxiao.

== During Later Tang ==
During the Tongguang era (923–926) of the subsequent Later Tang, Kang Yanxiao, who then carried the name of Li Shaochen (bestowed by the emperor Li Cunxu), served as the military governor (Jiedushi) of Baoyi Circuit (保義, headquartered in modern Sanmenxia, Henan), and Zhao Ying continued to serve under him. When Li Shaochen served on Li Cunxu's campaign to destroy Later Tang's southwestern neighbor Former Shu, Zhao remained at Baoyi. Subsequently, after Li Cunxu was killed in a mutiny at the capital Luoyang and was succeeded by his adoptive brother Li Siyuan, Li Siyuan's son-in-law Shi Jingtang was made the acting military governor of Baoyi. Zhao, as a member of Li Shaochen's old staff, greeted him, and it was said that they became like old friends immediately. Shi thus had him serve as a secretary. Thereafter, wherever Shi's posting changed, Zhao followed him, and he frequently served as Shi's liaison to the imperial government. When Shi was made the military governor of Hedong Circuit (河東, headquartered in modern Taiyuan, Shanxi), he served as Shi's assistant.

In 936, then-emperor Li Congke (Li Siyuan's adoptive son), who had long suspected Shi of plotting rebellion, decided to test Shi by issuing an edict moving him to Tianping Circuit (天平, headquartered in modern Tai'an, Shandong). Shi, fearing that this was a trap, convened his key staff members asked for their opinions on what to do. Zhao advocated that he report to Tianping. However, several other key staff members, including Liu Zhiyuan and Sang Weihan, suggested that he rebel. Shi ultimately agreed and rebelled. He sought aid from Emperor Taizong of Later Tang's northern rival, the Khitan Empire. A Later Tang army, under the command of Zhang Jingda, soon put Hedong's capital Taiyuan under siege, but Emperor Taizong thereafter arrived with a Khitan relief army, and crushed Zhang's army. He declared Shi the emperor of a new Later Jin.

== During Later Jin ==
=== During Shi Jingtang's reign ===
Shi Jingtang commissioned a number of key officials for his new imperial government. As part of these commissions, Zhao Ying was made the chief imperial scholar (翰林學士承旨, Hanlin Xueshi Chengzhi) and deputy minister of census (戶部侍郎, Hubu Shilang), to be in charge of the Hedong headquarters. Subsequently, after Zhang Jingda's deputy Yang Guangyuan assassinated Zhang and surrendered the Later Tang army to the joint Khitan/Later Jin army, As Shi and Emperor Taizong prepared to advance south toward Luoyang, Shi commissioned Zhao and Sang Weihan as chancellors (同中書門下平章事, Tong Zhongshu Menxia Pingzhangshi), with Zhao also receiving the additional title of Menxia Shilang (門下侍郎) and Sang Zhongshu Shilang (中書侍郎). Zhao was also put in charge of editing the imperial histories.

After the joint Khitan/Later Jin forces then forced the surrender of the Later Tang general Zhao Dejun, whose army was the only major obstacle remaining between their army and Luoyang, at Lu Prefecture (潞州, in modern Changzhi, Shanxi), Emperor Taizong decided to remain at Lu while letting Shi take Luoyang himself, to avoid overly alarming the ethnic Han Chinese. As they departed from each other, Emperor Taizong commented to Shi, "Liu Zhiyuan, Zhao Ying, and Sang Weihan are all great contributors to your establishment of the empire. Do not abandon them unless they had major faults." As Shi approached Luoyang, Li Congke, finding the situation hopeless, committed suicide with his family, ending Later Tang and allowing Later Jin to take over its territory.

After Shi entered Luoyang, he sent Zhao as a special emissary to the Khitan court to thank Emperor Taizong. Upon Zhao's return from the Khitan court, he was given the additional titles of Guanglu Daifu (光祿大夫) and minister of civil service affairs (吏部尚書, Libu Shangshu); he was also put in charge of taxation. It was said that, as chancellor, Zhao was humble and paid attention to promoting capable junior officials. In particular, in his role as lead editor of the imperial histories, he commissioned many capable historians to collect the previously lost Tang records. It was said that Zhao had a hand in some 200 volumes of the consequently completed Old Book of Tang, as well as correcting and supplementing the missing parts of the imperial chronicles of various Tang emperors.

In 939, there was a time when Shi bestowed honorary chancellor titles on both Liu and Shi's brother-in-law Du Chongwei, on the same edict. Liu was insulted (as he considered himself to have had great achievement in battle, while Du was receiving the honors on account of his being the emperor's brother-in-law), and therefore repeatedly declined. In anger over what he saw as Liu's defiance, Shi considered removing Liu from his offices entirely. It was Zhao who spoke on Liu's behalf — pointing out that when Zhang initially attacked Taiyuan, he did so with overwhelming force, and that it was through Liu's efforts that Taiyuan did not fall, until Emperor Taizong could arrive with a relief force. Shi thus relented and did not remove Liu; rather, he sent the imperial scholar He Ning to see Liu, to express his displeasure. Liu thereafter accepted the title.

In 942, Shi bestowed on Zhao the greater chancellor title Shizhong (侍中).

=== During Shi Chonggui's reign ===
Shi Jingtang died later in 942 and was succeeded by his nephew Shi Chonggui. Zhao Ying initially continued to serve as chancellor, but in spring 943 was sent out of then-capital Kaifeng to serve as the military governor of Jinchang Circuit (晉昌, headquartered in modern Xi'an, Shaanxi), still carrying the Zhongshu Ling title as an honorary chancellor title. (Sang Weihan, who had been serving as the military governor of Jinchang, was recalled to serve as chancellor.) At that time, there was a major locust infestation that affected Later Jin territory. Zhao ordered that those who were able to capture and kill locusts would be given the equal amount of weight in grain. By doing so, those who were hungry were fed, and there was much praise for him in and near the circuit. Sometime thereafter, he was moved to be the military governor of Kuangguo Circuit (匡國, headquartered in modern Weinan). About a year after that, he was recalled to Kaifeng to serve as its mayor.

By 945, Shi Chonggui's brother-in-law Feng Yu, who was then his chief of staff (along with Sang), and the general Li Yantao (李彥韜), had become powerful as close associates of the emperor. They disliked Sang, and believed that Zhao was more easily controllable. They thus persuaded Shi to remove Sang from the chancellorship and make Sang the mayor of Kaifeng. Zhao was returned to chancellorship, still with the title Zhongshu Ling.

Instead of the friendly relations that Shi Jingtang had with the Khitan (whose state had been renamed Liao by this point), Shi Chonggui took a confrontational stance, and the two states were constantly at war. In 946, Liao's Emperor Taizong laid a trap for Later Jin, by having his major general Zhao Yanshou (Zhao Dejun's son) "secretly" send emissaries to Later Jin, offering to submit to Later Jin, asking for a major Later Jin army to be launched to support him (who was then in command at Liao's Lulong Circuit (盧龍, headquartered in modern Beijing), which Shi Jingtang had ceded to Liao). Shi Chonggui's chiefs of staffs Feng and Li Song believed Zhao Yanshou, and prepared a large army to be launched under the command of Du Chongwei (whose name had been changed to Du Wei by that point, to observe the naming taboo for Shi Chonggui), with Li Shouzhen serving as Du's deputy. Zhao Ying found the ambitious and ungrateful Du unsuitable, secretly stating to Feng and Li Song:

Chancellor Du [(as Du carried an honorary chancellor title)] is a relative of the Emperor, and is a highly honored chancellor and general. Despite that, his desires are not quenched, and he is often resentful. How could he be given the command of another army? If there is to be a campaign toward the north, it is better to entrust just Li Shouzhen.

Zhao Ying was not listened to, however. The army, under Du's command, was soon launched, but fell into a trap laid by Emperor Taizong as soon as it entered Liao territory, and, on its subsequent withdrawal, became surrounded by Emperor Taizong's army at Zhongdu Bridge (中度橋, in modern Baoding, Hebei). After Emperor Taizong (falsely) promised Du that he would make Du the emperor of China to replace Shi Chonggui, Du surrendered. Emperor Taizong then advanced south toward Kaifeng. Believing Kaifeng to be defenseless (as nearly the entire Later Jin imperial army was under Du's command and surrendered with him), Shi surrendered, ending Later Jin.

== During Liao ==
Once he entered Kaifeng, Emperor Taizong claimed to be the emperor of China as well. He sent Shi Chonggui and his household north into exile, deep into Liao proper, at Huanglong (黃龍, in modern Changchun, Jilin), and had Zhao Ying, Feng Yu, and Li Yantao accompany them. (However, it appeared, based on subsequent events, that Zhao stopped once he reached Lulong's capital You Prefecture (幽州), and did not actually accompany Shi and his household to Huanglong.) After Emperor Taizong died later in the year and was succeeded by his nephew Emperor Shizong, who effectively withdrew from the former Later Jin territory (which was then taken over by Liu Zhiyuan, who declared himself emperor of a new state of Later Han, Emperor Shizong gave Zhao the honorary title Taizi Taibao (太子太保).

Zhao's activities in the subsequent years were not well-described in history. Meanwhile, his mansion at Kaifeng (as with the mansions of all high-level officials that Emperor Taizong took to Liao territory, which Liu awarded to his key followers) was seized by Liu and given to Liu's general Guo Wei. Guo summoned Zhao's son Zhao Yize (趙易則) and offered back all the secondary properties associated with the mansion to Zhao Yize, along with a cash payment for the mansion. Zhao Yize, apprehensive of the powerful Guo, initially declined, but Guo insisted on his accepting. Zhao Ying heard of this and became grateful to Guo.

By 951, Later Han had fallen (save for Hedong Circuit, which was controlled by Liu Zhiyuan's younger brother Liu Chong, who declared himself emperor of Later Han, but whose state was considered by traditional historians to be the separate state of Northern Han), and Guo had founded Later Zhou in succeeding it. He sent his official Tian Min (田敏) as an emissary to the Liao court (apparently to try to dissuade Liao from aiding Liu Chong). When Tian reached You, he saw Zhao Ying. Zhao, emotional over being able to see a Han Chinese official, stated:

This old body has drifted here to be a guest here. I heard recently that my wife has died, but my weak son is all right. I also heard that he had received the good graces of the emperor of the Central Plains. My old mansion at the eastern capital [(i.e., Kaifeng)] belonged to the state, but even then was compensated for its price out of the emperor's grace. This old man, to his death, has no way to repay such mercy.

He bowed toward the south, and broke down in tears. Not too long after, he fell ill. He made a request to Emperor Shizong that after his death, his body may be returned to Later Zhou territory for burial, to allow his spirit to return home. Emperor Shizong, taking mercy on him, agreed. Zhao Ying died shortly after. After his death, Emperor Shizong had his son Zhao Yicong (趙易從) and other family members, as well as a Liao general, escort his casket to Kaifeng. Guo was greatly saddened, and gave him posthumous honors. Guo also awarded Zhao's sons silk to finance a proper burial at his old house in Huayin.

== Notes and references ==
- Old History of the Five Dynasties, vol. 89.
- New History of the Five Dynasties, vol. 56.
- Zizhi Tongjian, vols. 280, 282, 283, 285, 286.
