= Elizabeth Griffin =

Montserratian barrister (1945–2015)

Elizabeth Constance Griffin
- Born: 5 May 1945; Antigua
- Died: 10 June 2015 (aged 70); Stockbridge, Hampshire, England
- Education: University of Oxford
- Occupations: Barrister, legal educator
- Known for: First female barrister in Montserrat

Elizabeth Constance Griffin (5 May 1945 – 10 June 2015) was a Montserratian female barrister and legal educator. In 1969, she became the first female barrister in the British Crown Colony of Montserrat. In 1969, she became the first woman to be called to the bar in Montserrat. She later worked in legal education in the United Kingdom, including at the Inns of Court School of Law.

== Background ==
Griffin was born on the island of Antigua to Charles Griffin, M.D. and social worker Patricia Griffin. She later moved with her family to London, England, at the age of eight.

== Education and career ==
She earned her law degree from Oxford University. During this time, she also passed her Duke of Edinburgh's Award.

Following graduation, she returned to Montserrat to work for the Attorney General of Montserrat as a legal assistant as part of her pupillage before becoming a barrister. In 1969, she was called to the bar as Montserrat's first female barrister. In front of a court viewed mostly by women, Griffin stated that she would "endeavor to set the highest standards for any ladies who follow me." Her admission to the bar came during a period when women were still underrepresented in the legal profession across the Caribbean and the United Kingdom.

Griffin later lectured at the West Kent College in Tonbridge, England. In 1993, upon moving back to London, she began teaching at the Inns of Court School of Law.

== Legacy ==
In 2018, Georgetown University's Center for Global Health Science and Security was selected by the ERG Foundation to launch as the Elizabeth R. Griffin program, intended to advance research and educational missions.

== Personal life ==
In 1970, Griffin married Andrew George Prideaux (born 1945). Her children are Michael (born 1971) and the late Louisa (born 1974). She has three grandchildren, Flora (born 2004), Ned (born 2006), and William Prideaux (born 2009). She moved to Lewes, East Sussex, England, and she later moved to Stockbridge, Hampshire, where she died in 2015.
