= Patricia Griffin =

Montserratian nurse and social worker (1907–1986)

- Born: Patricia Constance Wilhelmina Haines; 24 October 1907; Saint Anthony Parish, Montserrat
- Died: 1986 (aged 78–79); Darwen, Lancashire, England
- Other names: Patricia Haines, Pattie Griffin
- Occupations: Nurse, volunteer social worker
- Years active: 1939–1976
- Known for: establishing the Old People’s Welfare Association

Patricia Griffin (24 October 1907 – 1986) was a nurse and volunteer social worker from Montserrat. In addition to providing nursing services, she founded the Old People's Welfare Association, was instrumental in developing the pre-school program and established a consumer protection association on the island. An educational scholarship is granted in her name and she was honoured by a stamp depicting her likeness.

== Early life ==
Patricia Constance Wilhelmina Haines was born on 24 October 1907 in Saint Anthony Parish, Montserrat to Jane (née Bell) and F. W. Haines. Her mother, of Irish descent, was an immigrant from Antigua and her father was an English rector who served as canon of Saint Anthony Parish for forty years. Haines, as was customary for her time, was educated in England, taking nursing classes at St Thomas' Hospital and Battersea Maternity Hospital in London.

== Career ==
In 1939, Haines returned to the Caribbean and began working as Matron at the Roseau Hospital of Dominica. She then worked at Antigua's Holberton Hospital and Nevis' Alexandra Hospital, before marrying Dr. Charles Norman Griffin in 1942.

After her marriage, Griffin lived in various of the Leeward Islands where her husband worked as a physician and in England. The couple had three children, Mary Patricia and Elizabeth Constance, who were born in Antigua and a son, John. Mary became an art teacher and worked to develop the art program at the Montserrat Secondary School, in Plymouth, Montserrat. Elizabeth would become the first woman lawyer of Montserrat and her son, John, would become an English physician. In 1964, the family returned to Montserrat, where Griffin worked as a nurse in her husband's surgery.

In 1964, Griffin founded the Old People's Welfare Association (OPWA) to care for disabled or special needs youth and elderly citizens over 70 years of age. She organized the OPWA by dividing the country into districts and assigned scouts to evaluate lack of care, housing, and nutrition in these vulnerable populations. Serving as chief fundraiser of the organization she raised money to provide in-home care or home repair for citizens unable to provide for themselves. She designed a resident project for the elderly which she envisioned would have nine cottages, as well as community services. She raised funds for four units and the government funded an additional two units.

Griffin served as an executive of the Red Cross and for the YWCA, and helped establish the first pre-school program on the island. Her work with these organizations led to the development between 1966 and 1972 of the Montserrat Consumers Association, with the goals of increasing education about consumer goods. The organization addressed such things as nutrition and quality of goods, publishing a periodical known as Consumer Concern. When her husband died in 1976, Griffin moved to England to be near her son.

== Death and legacy ==
Griffin died in 1986 in Darwen, Lancashire, England. In 1987, her children established the Norman and Patricia Griffin Trust Fund to assist secondary and tertiary students on the island with educational scholarships. In 2006, she was posthumously honoured by a stamp issued by the Government of Montserrat, recognizing her contributions to the social welfare of the island.
