= Francesco Camaldo =

Italian priest of the Catholic Church

The Reverend Monsignor Francesco Camaldo
- Papal Master of Ceremonies
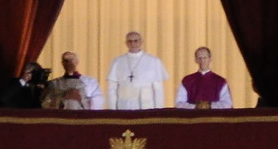
- Church: Catholic Church
- In office: 1984–2013
- Other post: Dean of Papal Ceremonies (c. 2005–2013)

Orders
- Ordination: 26 June 1976 by Ugo Poletti, Italy
- Rank: Prelate of Honor of His Holiness

Personal details
- Born: 24 October 1952 (age 73) Lagonegro
- Occupation: Secretary at the Vatican, Official of the Vicariate of Rome at the Vatican, Assistant pastor at the Vatican
- Motto: Mater Mea Fiducia Mea
- Coat of arms

Francesco Camaldo (born 24 October 1952) is an Italian priest of the Catholic Church.

== Birth ==
Camaldo was born on 24 October 1952 in Lagonegro, Italy.

== Seminarian and priest ==
After high school, Camaldo was a student in the Roman Seminary and later was ordained priest on 26 June 1976 by Cardinal Vicar Ugo Poletti, Francesco Camaldo also was vicar of the parish of St. Mary of Consolation, Casalbertone in Rome (1976-1990)

== Studies ==
Bachelor of Philosophy and Theology at the Pontifical Lateran University, Bachelor of Spiritual Theology at the Pontifical Gregorian University, Bachelor and Doctor in Sacred Liturgy at the Pontifical Liturgical Institute of San Anselmo.

== Jobs in The Roman Curia ==
The charges that were assigned as follows:

- Chaplain of the Chapel of St. Andrew Corsini for the Honorable Papal Basilica of St. John Lateran (17 January 1988)
- Assistant studies in the Congregation for Divine Worship and the Discipline of the Sacraments (1 January 1993)
- Officer of the Vicariate of Rome (1984-1993)
- Private Secretary to Cardinal Ugo Poletti, from 1984 to 1997 when he died.
- Club Chaplain of St. Peter (22 February 2005)
- Rector of the Chapel of St. Mary of Mercy in the Coliseum (October 10, 2005)

Cardinal Camillo Ruini, Vicar General of His Holiness for the city of Rome, appointed Mons. Camaldo:

- Club Chaplain of St. Peter (22 February 2005)
- Dean of the Chapel of St. Mary of Mercy in the Coliseum (October 10, 2005)

Dean of Pontifical Ceremonies

Francesco Camaldo was also Prelate of Honor of His Holiness and Master of Ceremonies (27 June 1984). Dean of the masters of Papal Ceremonies.

== Conclave of 2005 ==
Dean of the masters of Papal Ceremonies, Monsignor Camaldo appeared repeatedly in the events of the funeral of John Paul II and the election of Benedict XVI. Amongst these were the wake of the pope's funeral, the Pro Eligendo Romano Pontifice mass, the conclave and the Habemus Papam.
