= Li Congke =

Emperor of Later Tang from 934 to 937

Li Congke 李從珂

Emperor of the Later Tang dynasty
- Reign: 21 May 934 – 11 January 937
- Predecessor: Li Conghou
- Successor: Dynasty abolished
- Born: Ershisan (二十三); 11 February 885
- Died: 11 January 937 (aged 51)
Full name
- Family name: Originally Wang (王), later Lǐ (李); Given name: Cóngkē (從珂)
Era name and dates
- Qīngtài (清泰): 31 May 934 – 11 January 937
Posthumous name
- None
Temple name
- None
- House: Wang (by birth); Li (adoptive)
- Dynasty: Later Tang

Li Congke (simplified Chinese: 李从珂; traditional Chinese: 李從珂; pinyin: Lǐ Cóngkē) (11 February 885 – 11 January 937), also known in historiography as the Last Emperor of Later Tang (後唐末帝), Deposed Emperor of Later Tang (後唐廢帝), Wang Congke (王從珂) (particularly during the succeeding Later Jin dynasty, which did not recognize him as a legitimate Later Tang emperor), or Prince of Lu (潞王, a title Li Congke carried prior to his reign), childhood name Ershisan (二十三, "23") or, in short, Asan (阿三), was the fourth and last emperor of the Later Tang dynasty of China. He was an adoptive son of Li Siyuan (Emperor Mingzong) and took the throne after overthrowing Emperor Mingzong's biological son Li Conghou (Emperor Min). He was later himself overthrown by his brother-in-law Shi Jingtang, who was supported by Liao troops (and whose Later Jin succeeded his). When the combined Later Jin and Khitan forces defeated Later Tang forces, Li Congke and his family members, as well as the guards most loyal to him, ascended a tower and set it on fire, dying in the fire.

== Background ==
Li Congke was born in 885, during the reign of Emperor Xizong of Tang, in Pingshan (平山, in modern Shijiazhuang, Hebei). His biological father was a man with the surname of Wang. His mother was a Lady Wei; it seems likely, although not completely clearly stated in historical records, that Lady Wei was Wang's wife.

During the subsequent Jingfu era (892-893) of Emperor Xizong's brother and successor Emperor Zhaozong, there was a time when Li Siyuan, then an officer under his adoptive father, the major warlord Li Keyong the military governor (Jiedushi) of Hedong Circuit (河東, headquartered in modern Taiyuan, Hebei), was pillaging the Pingshan region under Li Keyong's command. He happened to encounter Lady Wei and Li Congke, and he captured them. He made Lady Wei either a co-wife (with Lady Cao, the mother of a daughter who later married Shi Jingtang and would later be empress during Later Jin, and possibly with Lady Xia, the mother of his biological sons Li Congrong and Li Conghou) or a concubine subordinated to Lady Cao. He took Li Congke as an adoptive son and named him Congke. (Li Congke was older than all of his biological sons, and it is not known whether any of them were born at this point, as the age of his two oldest biological sons, Li Congshen (李從審) and Li Congrong, were not recorded in history, although Li Conghou and another biological son, Li Congyi, were born long later.) As he was born on the 23rd day of the first lunar month of 885, he received the nickname of "Ershisan" (23), or "Asan" in short.

In his childhood, Li Congke was said to be cautious and silent. According to an account that Li Siyuan gave later, Li Siyuan's household was not wealthy at that time, and there was often not enough money for household expenses. Li Congke took on part of the household financial burdens by collecting lime and horse manure, for family use and/or for sale. Lady Wei died a few years after she was captured and was buried at Hedong's capital Taiyuan.

== During Jin ==
After Tang fell in 906, Li Keyong's domain became the state of Jin and was ruled by Li Keyong, and then, after Li Keyong's death, by Li Keyong's biological son Li Cunxu, as its princes. Li Siyuan was one of Li Cunxu's major generals, and Li Congke served under him. It was said that Li Congke was tall and strong, and had an impressive appearance; it was also said that Li Siyuan loved him greatly. He became well known for his battle prowess, leading Li Cunxu (who was the same age as Li Congke and who was himself a ferocious warrior) to state, "Not only is Asan the same as I am in age, but he is like I am in daring to battle." Li Congke participated in a major Jin victory over the Khitan Empire in 917, serving under his father.

In late 918, Li Cunxu wanted to carry out a major campaign to destroy Jin's southern archrival Later Liang, and personally took an army south toward Later Liang's capital Daliang. He encountered the main Later Liang army, under the command of the general He Gui, at Huliu Slope (胡柳陂, in modern Heze, Shandong), south of the Yellow River (which then served as the de facto boundary between Jin and Later Liang). The Jin army was initially victorious, but a subsequent confusion in communications led the Jin army to believe that it was being defeated, and the army collapsed. In the confusion, the major general Zhou Dewei was killed, and Li Siyuan lost communications with Li Cunxu, while Li Congke was in the small group of soldiers accompanying Li Cunxu himself. Li Siyuan, believing that Li Cunxu had already crossed the Yellow River north back into Jin territory, headed north across the river, while Li Cunxu, in actuality, was still trying to battle out of the confused rout. Li Congke, serving under Li Cunxu, subsequently assisted Li Cunxu in capturing an earthen mound, allowing Li Cunxu to have superior positioning to launch a counterattack. The Jin counterattack was successful, allowing the Jin army to kill a large number of Later Liang soldiers and leading to the overall battle being effectively a draw, with both armies having lost two-thirds of their soldiers and unable to attack each other again for some time. At the end of the battle, Li Cunxu was able to capture Puyang (濮陽, in modern Puyang, Henan) as a waypoint to his eventual withdrawal back to his own territory. Li Congke also contributed to the successful counterattack. When Li Siyuan subsequently heard that Li Cunxu was at Puyang, he turned back south and rendezvoused with Li Cunxu there. Li Cunxu, displeased, stated, "Lord, you believed that I was dead? Why did you cross the river?" Li Siyuan had to bow and apologize. It was said that Li Cunxu acted like he forgave Li Siyuan due to Li Congke's contributions, but did not completely do so in his heart, distancing himself from Li Siyuan for several years.

== During Li Cunxu's reign as emperor of Later Tang ==
In 922, Li Cunxu claimed the title of emperor of a new state of Later Tang. However, at that time, Later Tang was facing military pressure both from Later Liang and Khitan, and the military food supply and morale were low. At that time, the main Later Liang army was commanded by Dai Siyuan, who also served as the military governor of Tianping Circuit (天平, headquartered in modern Tai'an, Shandong). He left his officers Lu Shunmi (盧順密), Liu Suiyan (劉遂嚴), and Yan Yong (燕顒) at Tianping's capital Yun Prefecture (鄆州) to defend it. Shortly after Li Cunxu's declaration of imperial title, however, Lu defected to Later Tang and revealed that Yun was defended by less than 1,000 soldiers and that Liu and Yan lacked support from the soldiers. He advocated that Later Tang attack it by surprise. As Yun was deep in Later Liang territory south of the Yellow River, however, most of Li Cunxu's generals, including his chief of staff (Shumishi) Guo Chongtao, opposed Lu's proposal, believing that it would be dangerous and futile. Li Siyuan, however, wanting to repair his relationship with Li Cunxu, offered to command this mission by himself. Li Cunxu agreed, and allowed him to take 5,000 soldiers to, under cover of darkness, rapidly descend on Yun to attack it. Li Siyuan's army managed to evade Later Liang detection, and when they reached Yun, Li Congke led the soldiers in scaling the walls. The city fell to Li Siyuan, who was commissioned the military governor of Tianping and held it for Later Tang over the next several months as the Later Liang army (by then under the command of Wang Yanzhang) futilely tried to cut off the supply route from Later Tang proper to Yun.

Later Liang's emperor Zhu Zhen then decided to replace Wang with Duan Ning. Duan crossed the Yellow River and headed for Chan Prefecture (澶州, in modern Anyang, Henan) and prepared an ambitious four-prong attack against Later Tang:

1. Dong Zhang would head toward Taiyuan.
2. Huo Yanwei would head toward Zhen Prefecture (鎮州, in modern Baoding, Hebei).
3. Wang Yanzhang and Zhang Hanjie (張漢傑) would head toward Yun.
4. Duan himself, along with Du Yanqiu, would confront Li Cunxu.

When Wang made an exploratory attack on Yun, however, Li Congke led a small contingent of cavalry soldiers and repelled his attack, causing him to withdraw to Zhongdu (中都, in modern Jining, Shandong). Li Cunxu, with his resolve strengthened by Li Congke's victory, then outflanked Duan and headed to Yun to rendezvous with Li Siyuan. Together, they then engaged Wang and Zhang at Zhongdu and defeated and captured them. With Wang's army the only Later Liang army that stood between him and Daliang, Li Cunxu then headed directly for the defenseless Later Liang capital. Believing defeat to be inevitable, Zhu Zhen committed suicide, ending Later Liang. Li Cunxu, upon entering Daliang, stated to Li Siyuan, "How I came to have this realm is due to the accomplishment of you and your son. I will share it with you and your son." Upon his entry into Daliang, the Later Liang officials surrendered to him. He sent Li Congke to take up position at Fengqiu (封丘, in modern Xinxiang, Henan), apparently concerned that Duan and Du may still resist, but Du and Duan subsequently each arrived at Fengqiu and surrendered as well. By this point, Li Cunxu was in control of the Later Liang territory.

By 924, at which time there was a Khitan incursion, Li Congke carried the title of the commander of the left cavalry at the northern capital (Taiyuan), and was dispatched to the frontier, along with Li Shaobin the military governor of Henghai Circuit (橫海, headquartered in modern Cangzhou, Hebei), to defend against the Khitan. By 925, he was serving as the prefect of Wei Prefecture (衛州, in modern Puyang). However, when Li Siyuan made the request that Li Congke be sent back to Taiyuan, Li Cunxu was angered by what he saw as an overly daring request, and not only denied it but demoted Li Congke to be the commander of raiding troops, stationing him at Shimen Base (石門鎮, in modern Tangshan, Hebei). This caused Li Siyuan to be fearful, and only time's passage appeared to alleviate Li Cunxu's anger. (Apparently it was around this time that, on an occasion when Li Congke was at Zhen Prefecture – which served as the capital of Chengde Circuit (成德), which his father Li Siyuan was the military governor of – LI Congke and Li Siyuan's close associate An Chonghui got into a dispute at dinner. Li Congke punched An hard in the head, and An only avoided further injury by fleeing. Li Congke later regretted and apologized, but while An accepted the apology, he bore a grudge against Li Congke from that point on.)

In 926, Li Cunxu and his wife Empress Liu, suspecting Guo and another major general, Zhu Youqian, of treason, killed them. This caused the army morale to collapse, and many mutinies rose against him throughout the Later Tang realm. He sent Li Siyuan to combat one of the major ones, at Yedu (鄴都, in modern Handan, Hebei), but Li Siyuan's own soldiers also mutinied and forced him to join forces with the Yedu mutineers. Fearing that he would not be able to explain himself, Li Siyuan decided to actually rebel against Li Cunxu, and he headed south toward Daliang and then-capital Luoyang. Li Congke took his soldiers and rendezvoused with Chengde's disciplinary officer Wang Jianli at Zhen, and they headed south together to reinforce Li Siyuan's troops. Li Siyuan was able to enter Daliang quickly and then head toward Luoyang. Before he could reach there, though, Li Cunxu was killed in a mutiny at Luoyang itself. Li Siyuan entered Luoyang and took the title of regent, as he was apparently undecided at that time whether to support Li Cunxu's son Li Jiji the Prince of Wei, who was returning from an expedition that destroyed Later Tang's southwestern neighbor Former Shu.

== During Li Siyuan's reign ==
However, Li Siyuan subsequently became resolved to resist Li Jiji, and he sent Li Congke to Huguo Circuit (護國, headquartered in modern Yuncheng, Shanxi) and Shi Jingtang to Baoyi Circuit (保義, headquartered in modern Sanmenxia, Henan), to serve as their acting military governors and to defend against potential attacks by Li Jiji. Li Jiji's own army abandoned him, however, and he committed suicide, ending the possibility of a confrontation. Li Siyuan then took imperial title. Apparently shortly after, Li Congke was made the full military governor of Huguo. In 927, he received the honorary titles of acting Taibao (太保) and chancellor (同中書門下平章事, Tong Zhongshu Menxia Pingzhangshi). He subsequently received the honorary titles of acting Taifu (太傅) and then acting Taiwei (太尉).

Early in Li Siyuan's reign, An Chonghui became chief of staff and was the most powerful official at court, such that even Li Congke's adoptive brothers Li Congrong and Li Conghou had to honor him. An, still begrudging Li Congke over their long-ago confrontation, began to speak poorly of Li Congke to Li Siyuan, but Li Siyuan initially did nothing. In 930, An issued an order in Li Siyuan's name to Li Congke's guard commander Yang Yanwen (楊彥溫), ordering him to expel Li Congke. Yang found an opportunity when Li Congke went outside the city walls of Huguo's capital Hezhong Municipality (河中) to examine cavalry troops, and locked the city gates, refusing Li Congke reentry. When Li Congke questioned him why he did so, Yang responded, "It is not that I, Yang Yanwen, wishes to turn away from the grace you showed me. It is that the Office of the Chancellor issued an order to ask you, Lord, to pay homage to the emperor." Li Congke decided to head toward Luoyang but stop at Yuxiang (虞鄉, in modern Yuncheng) and report this to Li Siyuan. Li Siyuan became suspicious, but An disavowed any connection to Yang and stated that Yang must just be a mutineer. Li Siyuan sent the generals Suo Zitong (索自通) and Yao Yanchou (藥彥稠) to attack Yang, with the orders that Yang should be captured alive so that the emperor could question Yang himself. Apparently under An's orders, however, when Suo and Yao captured the city, they executed Yang. Li Siyuan was very angry, but did not punish them.

An then induced the chancellors Zhao Feng and Feng Dao to suggest that, due to the loss of the control of the circuit, Li Congke should be punished. Li Siyuan, however, refused, and he did as well when An himself spoke on the issue, but ordered Li Congke to return to his mansion at the capital. After Suo was subsequently made the military governor of Huguo, An encouraged him to make false reports that Li Congke was making weapons without permission. It was said that it was only due to efforts of Li Siyuan's favorite concubine Consort Wang that Li Congke escaped further punishment. The officials did not dare to associate with Li Congke, except for Li Qi, who lived close to Li Congke, and during this period of home living, Li Congke often consulted Li Qi before submitting monthly reports to Li Siyuan. During this period, Li Congke was said to often recite Buddhist sutras and pray.

In 931, An lost power, as he was removed as chief of staff (and was eventually executed). After An's removal, Li Siyuan summoned Li Congke and tearfully stated to him, "If I followed An Chonghui's wishes, how could I have seen you again?" He made Li Congke a general of the imperial guards, and shortly after restored his honorary chancellor title and made him the defender of the western capital Chang'an. In 932, Li Congke was moved to be the military governor of Fengxiang Circuit (鳳翔, headquartered in modern Baoji, Shaanxi). In 933, Li Siyuan created him the Prince of Lu (at the same time that Li Congyi and Li Siyuan's nephews Li Congwen (李從溫), Li Congzhang (李從璋), and Li Congmin (李從敏) were also created imperial princes).

In late 933, Li Siyuan fell deathly ill. Li Congrong, fearing that he would not be able to inherit the throne, tried to seize power, but was defeated and killed by the imperial guards. Li Siyuan died shortly after, and Li Conghou inherited the throne.

== During Li Conghou's reign ==
Li Conghou's administration was dominated by his chiefs of staff Zhu Hongzhao and Feng Yun, who were apprehensive of both Li Congke and Shi Jingtang, who was then the military governor of Hedong, as both had served Li Siyuan far longer and had greater popularity among the imperial troops. Their suspicions were stoked by the failure of Li Congke to come to Luoyang to attend to Li Siyuan's funeral. They decided to place greater control on Li Congke's family by sending Li Congke's son Li Chongji (李重吉), who had been an imperial guard officer, to Bo Prefecture (亳州, in modern Bozhou, Anhui) to serve as its prefect, and by summoning Li Congke's daughter Li Huiming (李惠明), who had become a Buddhist nun at Luoyang, into the palace to keep her under guard. These moves caused Li Congke to be fearful of their intentions.

In spring 934, Zhu and Feng, not wanting Shi and Li Congke to become entrenched at their circuits, issued orders as chiefs of staff – without an imperial edict – transferring Li Congke to Hedong, Shi to Chengde, and Chengde's military governor Fan Yanguang to Tianxiong Circuit (天雄, headquartered at Yedu). Fearful of the implications – particularly because Li Congzhang was to serve as acting military governor of Fengxiang, and Li Congzhang was known for violence, including personally killing An Chonghui with his hands – Li Congke consulted his staff members, most of whom advised him to rebel. He therefore did so, issuing a declaration that targeted Zhu and Feng for improper administration, killing Li Congrong, and supporting Li Conghou.

Li Congke's declaration initially drew little support from other regional governors, most of whom arrested his messengers while some were acting ambiguously. Li Conghou subsequently commissioned Chang'an's defender Wang Sitong to head the imperial army against Li Congke. The imperial army quickly arrived at Fengxiang's capital Fengxiang Municipality and put it under siege. As the city's walls were low and difficult to defend, the city came close to falling. Li Congke, hoping to sway the imperial army's morale, went up city walls and tearfully stated to them:

Even before my adulthood, I followed the deceased Emperor [(i.e., Li Siyuan)] into 100 battles, into situations of life and death. I suffered many injuries in helping to establish the state that we have now. You have followed me and seen this with your own eyes. Now the Imperial Government trusted in officials who spread rumors and turned away from flesh and blood. What crime have I committed that I now face death?

Many of the imperial soldiers had already been inclined to support Li Congke, and the speech touched them. When the imperial general Zhang Qianzhao (張虔釗) subsequently forced soldiers to scale Fengxiang's walls by threatening them with swords, the soldiers mutinied. The officer Yang Siquan (楊思權) took the opportunity to defect to Li Congke with his troops, leading to a general panic among the imperial troops. Most surrendered to Li Congke, while Wang and Yao fled but were eventually captured.

Li Congke advanced toward Luoyang. Li Conghou had Li Chongji and Li Huiming executed, and put his remaining troops under the command of Kang Yicheng (康義誠), who was to head west to resist Li Congke. However, when Kang's army encountered Li Congke's, Kang, as he had previously planned, surrendered to Li Congke as well. Hearing of this and believing that he had no further means to resist, Li Conghou fled the capital.

When the officials remaining at Luoyang then offered the throne to Li Congke, Li Congke initially declined. However, Empress Dowager Cao then issued an edict deposing Li Conghou and declaring Li Congke emperor, and Li Congke accepted. Li Conghou initially tried to resist by enlisting aid from Shi, who had headed south, initially with the intent of supporting Li Conghou, but Shi, judging the situation to be untenable, had Li Conghou's guards killed, leaving him defenseless. Li Congke subsequently sent messengers to Wei Prefecture, where Li Conghou had fled, to have Li Conghou killed. Li Conghou's wife Empress Kong and their four sons were also killed.

== Reign ==
One immediate issue for Li Congke to confront was that the imperial treasury lacked the resources for him to give out rewards of what he promised both his initial own Fengxiang soldiers and the imperial soldiers who submitted to him. Listening to the imperial scholar Li Zhuanmei (李專美), he gave out a reduced amount of rewards within the means of the imperial treasury, which drew resentment.

Another issue he had to confront was what to do with Shi Jingtang, whom, while a brother-in-law, he had long had a rivalry with. Empress Dowager Cao and Shi's wife the Princess of Wei both requested that Shi be allowed to return to Hedong, but Li Congke's own close associates mostly advocated keeping Shi at Luoyang. Li Congke's chief of staff Han Zhaoyin and Li Zhuanmei, however, believed that keeping Shi at Luoyang would cause both another brother-in-law, Zhao Yanshou the military governor of Xuanwu Circuit (宣武, headquartered at Daliang) and Zhao's father Zhao Dejun the military governor of Lulong Circuit (盧龍, headquartered in modern Beijing), to become apprehensive. As Shi appeared physically feeble at the time (after a lengthy illness), Li Congke considered him unlikely to be a future threat, and therefore sent him back to Hedong.

Throughout 935, there were repeated Khitan raids into Later Tang territory. Further, there were various floods and droughts in the realm, such that, as a combination, there were famines and refugee flights. With Shi and Zhao Dejun repeatedly asking for reinforcements and supplies, the people were becoming overburdened. Further, during a time when an imperial emissaries were delivering military uniforms to Shi's soldiers, Shi's soldiers were repeatedly chanting at Shi, "May you live 10,000 years!" (That was a statement that was only supposed to be stated to emperors.) While Shi executed 36 soldiers who led the chant, Li Congke nevertheless became more suspicious of Shi, and therefore commissioned Zhang Jingda the military governor of Wuning Circuit (武寧, headquartered in modern Xuzhou, Jiangsu) to be Shi's deputy as the commander of the armies in the north, to divide Shi's authority.

== Defeat and death ==
By spring 936, the tension between Li Congke and Shi had become very strong – as Shi was gathering up his wealth and consolidating them at Hedong, and it was commonly believed that Shi would rebel. Li Congke aggravated the situation when Shi's wife – whose title had by that point had become the greater title of Grand Princess of Jin – came to Luoyang to celebrate Li Congke's birthday. After she offered Li Congke wine to wish him long life, she asked to take leave of him and return to Hedong. Li Congke was already drunk, and he made the comment, "Why do you not stay longer? You wanted to return so quickly. Is it that you are about to rebel with Master Shi?" When she returned to Taiyuan and informed Shi, Shi became even more apprehensive.

The imperial scholars Li Song and Lü Qi (呂琦) believed that the solution was to ally with the Khitan Empire. They suggested that certain previously captured Khitan officers be released back to the Khitan; and that a certain amount of money be given to the Khitan each year. The chancellor Zhang Yanlang supported their proposal. However, another imperial scholar, Xue Wenyu (薛文遇) opposed, believing that it was likely to lead to the Khitan's asking for Li Congke's daughter in marriage, which Xue considered humiliating. Li Congke therefore put a stop to the proposal and demoted Lü.

In summer 936, at Xue's suggestion, Li Congke issued an edict moving Shi from Hedong to Tianping. Shi, in fear he would be killed en route, rebelled. Li Congke commissioned Zhang Jingda to lead the imperial troops against Shi, and Zhang quickly put Taiyuan under siege, but was unable to capture it quickly. Shi sought aid from Khitan's Emperor Taizong, promising that if Emperor Taizong agreed to support him as emperor, he would cede 16 prefectures to the north (the entire Lulong Circuit and the northern prefectures of Hedong Circuit) to Khitan. Emperor Taizong agreed, arriving in Hedong territory in fall 936. He quickly engaged Zhang's Later Tang imperial army, defeating Zhang. The remnants of Zhang's army was subsequently surrounded by the Khitan/Hedong troops at Jin'an Base (晉安寨, near Taiyuan).

While Jin'an was still under siege, Emperor Taizong declared Shi the emperor of a new state of Later Jin. Most officials advocated that Li Congke himself lead an army against Shi. Li Congke felt compelled to do so, but as he feared engaging Shi himself – as he was apparently both apprehensive of Shi's abilities and suffering from an illness at the time, and often resorted to drinking as a coping mechanism – stopped after reaching Heyang (河陽, slightly north of Luoyang). Instead, he ordered Zhao Dejun and Fan Yanguang (then the military governor of Tianxiong) to launch their troops to try to lift the siege on Jin'an. However, Zhao was intending to garner Khitan support for him to be made emperor instead, and therefore, as he approached Jin'an, stopped his army while engaging in secret negotiations with Emperor Taizong. Emperor Taizong was initially enticed (as he viewed Zhao's army to be still a strong one and difficult to deal with), but at the earnest beseeching of Shi's staff member Sang Weihan, decided to continue to support Shi. The siege of Jin'an continued, and eventually, Zhang's deputy Yang Guangyuan killed Zhang and surrendered.

With Zhang's army now under Khitan/Later Jin control, the joint Khitan/Later Jin army moved to engage Zhao's army, which effectively collapsed without a battle. Zhao Dejun and Zhao Yanshou (who had joined his father) surrendered to Emperor Taizong, leaving essentially no army to stop the Khitan/Later Jin advance toward Luoyang. Li Congke returned to Luoyang, and ascended a tower with his family (including Empress Dowager Cao, his wife Empress Liu, and his children), as well as some loyal officers. He set fire to it for them to commit suicide together. Shi subsequently entered Luoyang and took over the Later Tang realm. Shi subsequently gathered his bones and buried them near Li Siyuan's tomb.

== In fiction ==
Li Congke's background was the basis of a 14th-century zaju by the Yuan Dynasty playwright Guan Hanqing titled "Madame Liu Hosts the Celebration Feast for the Five Marquesses" (劉夫人慶賞五侯宴).

== Personal information ==
- Father
  - Lord Wang (王), personal name unknown
- Mother
  - Lady Wei, posthumously honored the Lady of Lu, later further honored Empress Xuanxian (honored 935), personal name unknown
- Adoptive Father
  - Li Siyuan
- Wife
  - Empress Liu, initially the Lady of Pei, later empress (created 934, committed suicide 937)
- Children
  - Li Chongji (李重吉), born by Empress Liu (killed by Li Conghou 934)
  - Li Chongmei (李重美), the Prince of Yong (created 936, committed suicide 937)
  - Li Huiming (李惠明), Buddhist nun with the dharma name Youcheng (幼澄) (killed by Li Conghou 934)
  - A daughter, still young when Li Congke died

Li Congke Later Tang Born: 885 Died: 937
Regnal titles
Preceded by Li Conghou (Emperor Min)	Emperor of Later Tang; 934–937	Succeeded by None (dynasty destroyed)
Preceded by Li Conghou (Emperor Min)	Emperor of China (Shanxi); 934–936	Succeeded by Shi Jingtang of Later Jin
Preceded by Li Conghou (Emperor Min)	Emperor of China (Central); 934–937	Succeeded by Shi Jingtang of Later Jin
Preceded by Li Conghou (Emperor Min)	Emperor of China (Beijing/Tianjin/Northern Hebei/Northern Shanxi); 934–937	Succeeded by Emperor Taizong of Liao
