= Later Tang =

Chinese imperial dynasty from 923 to 937

Tang 唐
- 923–937
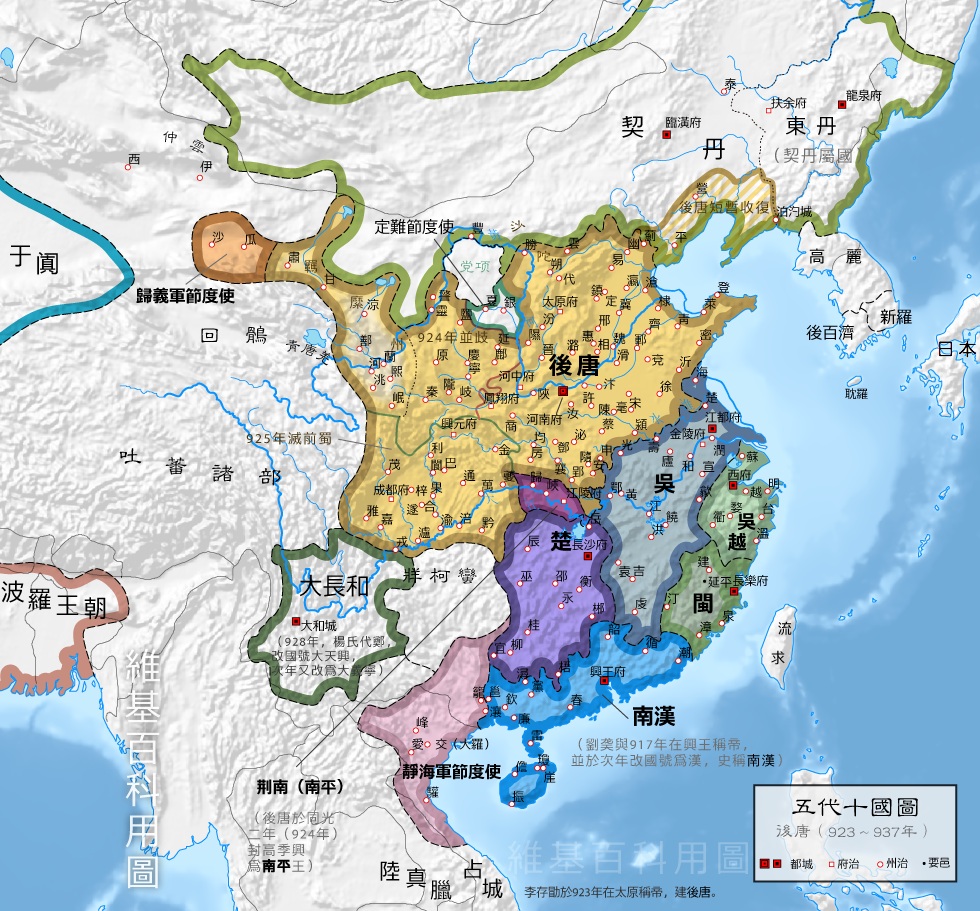
- Later Tang
- Capital: Daming; (923); Luoyang; (923–936)
- Common languages: Chinese
- Government: Monarchy
- Emperor
  - 923–926: Li Cunxu (Zhuangzong)
  - 926–933: Li Siyuan (Mingzong)
  - 933–934: Li Conghou
  - 934–936: Li Congke
- Historical era: Five Dynasties and Ten Kingdoms Period
  - Established in Daming: May 923
  - Overthrown by Khitan and Shi Jingtang: January 11, 937
- Currency: Chinese coin, Chinese cash
Preceded by
Jìn^{1}
Later Liang
Qi
Former Shu
Succeeded by
Later Jìn^{2}
Jingnan
Later Shu
- Today part of: China
- 1.The preceding entity of the Later Tang was the State of Jin, which was established by Li Keyong in 895 under the Tang dynasty and existed as an independent state in 907–923. 2.With the support of the Liao dynasty.

Tang, known in historiography as the Later Tang (Chinese: 後唐; pinyin: Hòu Táng), was a short-lived imperial dynasty of China and the second of the Five Dynasties during the Five Dynasties and Ten Kingdoms period in Chinese history.

With the exception of its final ruler, the Later Tang was ruled by ethnically Shatuo Turk (沙陀) emperors. The name Tang was used to legitimize itself as the restorer of the Tang dynasty. The official start of the Later Tang dynasty is in the year 923.

== Founding of the dynasty ==
The Later Tang dynasty emerged when Li Cunxu (李存勖), son of Shatuo Turk chieftain Li Keyong (李克用), conquered the Later Liang (后梁). After inheriting the Jin (晋) state, Li Cunxu waged a prolonged war against the Later Liang, culminating in the fall the Liang capital, Daliang (Kaifeng) in 923. His victory marked the first of the Five Dynasties' successive dynastic transitions.

The Later Tang dynasty was officially proclaimed in 923, though its origins lay in the precursor Jin dynasty (907-923), known in historiography as the Former Jin. Its founder Li Cunxu already possessed the Li surname – shared with the Tang emperors – which helped legitimize his claim as the Tang dynasty's rightful successor.

The Li Clan of Shatuo received the surname "Li" from Emperor Xianzong of Tang as a reward for their loyalty and military service.

By deliberately adopting the Tang dynastic name and emphasizing this genealogical connection, the Shatuo Turk ruler strengthened his regime's political legitimacy through symbolic continuity with the fallen Tang empire.

== Destruction of the dynasty ==
Despite its initial military strength, the Later Tang dynasty eventually collapsed due to internal rebellions, administrative mismanagement, and external pressure from the Khitan-led Liao dynasty. Li Cunxu, after founding the dynasty, increasingly focused on theatrical interests rather than governance, weakening central authority. His inability to restrain the power of regional military governors (jiedushi, 节度使) led to widespread dissatisfaction.

Following Li Cunxu's assassination in 926 AD, subsequent rulers, including Mingzong (Li Siyuan), faced challenges such as corruption and factional infighting. The dynasty’s final collapse came in 937 when Shi Jingtang, a rebellious jiedushi, allied with the Khitan to overthrow Li Congke. Shi established the Later Jin dynasty and ceded the strategic Sixteen Prefectures to the Liao, marking the end of the Later Tang.

== Religion ==
The Later Tang emperors, particularly Li Cunxu, were known for their patronage of Buddhism, continuing the Tang dynasty's tradition. Buddhist monasteries remained influential, though the Later Tang did not have the same level of state-sponsored Buddhist projects as the earlier Tang.

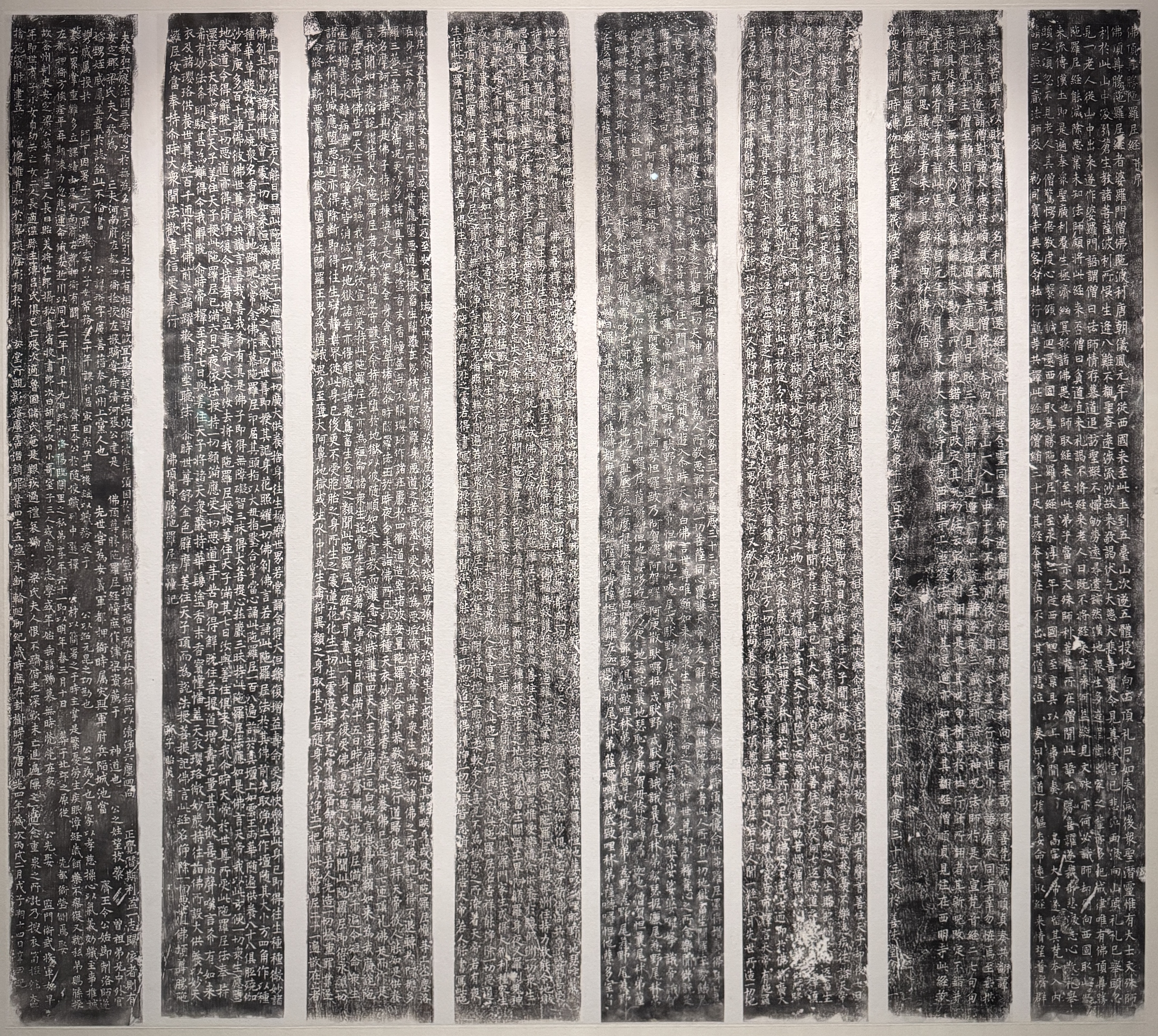
Rubbing from pillar carved with the Uṣṇīṣa Vijaya Dhāraṇī Sutra - Later Tang dynasty - 4th year Tongguang Reign (926)

== Rulers ==
Temple names	Posthumous names	Family names and given name	Durations of reigns	Era names and their according durations
Zhuāngzōng (莊宗)	Emperor Guāngshèng Shénmǐn Xiào (光聖神閔孝皇帝) Too Tedious; thus, unused when referring to this sovereign	Lǐ Cúnxù (李存勗)	923–926	Tóngguāng (同光) 923–926
Míngzōng (明宗)	Hewu (和武)	Lǐ Sìyuán (李嗣源) or Lǐ Dǎn (李亶)	926–933	Tiānchéng (天成) 926–930; Chángxīng (長興) 930–933
none	Mǐn (閔)	Lǐ Cónghòu (李從厚)	933–934	Yìngshùn (應順) 933–934
none	Mòdì (末帝)	Lǐ Cóngkē (李從珂)	934–937	Qīngtaì (清泰) 934–937

== Later Tang rulers family tree ==
Later Tang rulers

Adopted
Marriage
Li Keyong 李克用 856–908	Li Ni 李霓
Li Cunxu 李存勖 885–926; Zhuangzong 莊宗; 923–926	Li Siyuan 李嗣源 867–933; Mingzong 明宗; 926–933
Li Congke 李從珂 885–937; Modi 末帝; 934–937	Li Congyi 李從益 931–947; Prince of Xu 許王	Li Congrong 李從榮 d. 933; Prince of Qin 秦王	Li Conghou 李從厚 914–934; Mindi 愍帝; 933–934	Empress Li d. 950	Shi Jingtang 石敬瑭; Gaozu of Later Jin 高祖; 892–936–942
Li Chongmei 李重美 d. 937; Prince of Yong 雍王
