= 919 =

Calendar year

919 in various calendars
- Gregorian calendar: 919; CMXIX
- Ab urbe condita: 1672
- Armenian calendar: 368; ԹՎ ՅԿԸ
- Assyrian calendar: 5669
- Balinese saka calendar: 840–841
- Bengali calendar: 325–326
- Berber calendar: 1869
- Buddhist calendar: 1463
- Burmese calendar: 281
- Byzantine calendar: 6427–6428
- Chinese calendar: 戊寅年 (Earth Tiger); 3616 or 3409 — to — 己卯年 (Earth Rabbit); 3617 or 3410
- Coptic calendar: 635–636
- Discordian calendar: 2085
- Ethiopian calendar: 911–912
- Hebrew calendar: 4679–4680
- Hindu calendars
- Vikram Samvat: 975–976
- Shaka Samvat: 840–841
- Kali Yuga: 4019–4020
- Holocene calendar: 10919
- Iranian calendar: 297–298
- Islamic calendar: 306–307
- Japanese calendar: Engi 19 (延喜１９年)
- Javanese calendar: 818–819
- Julian calendar: 919; CMXIX
- Korean calendar: 3252
- Minguo calendar: 993 before ROC 民前993年
- Nanakshahi calendar: −549
- Seleucid era: 1230/1231 AG
- Thai solar calendar: 1461–1462
- Tibetan calendar: ས་ཕོ་སྟག་ལོ་ (male Earth-Tiger); 1045 or 664 or −108 — to — ས་མོ་ཡོས་ལོ་ (female Earth-Hare); 1046 or 665 or −107

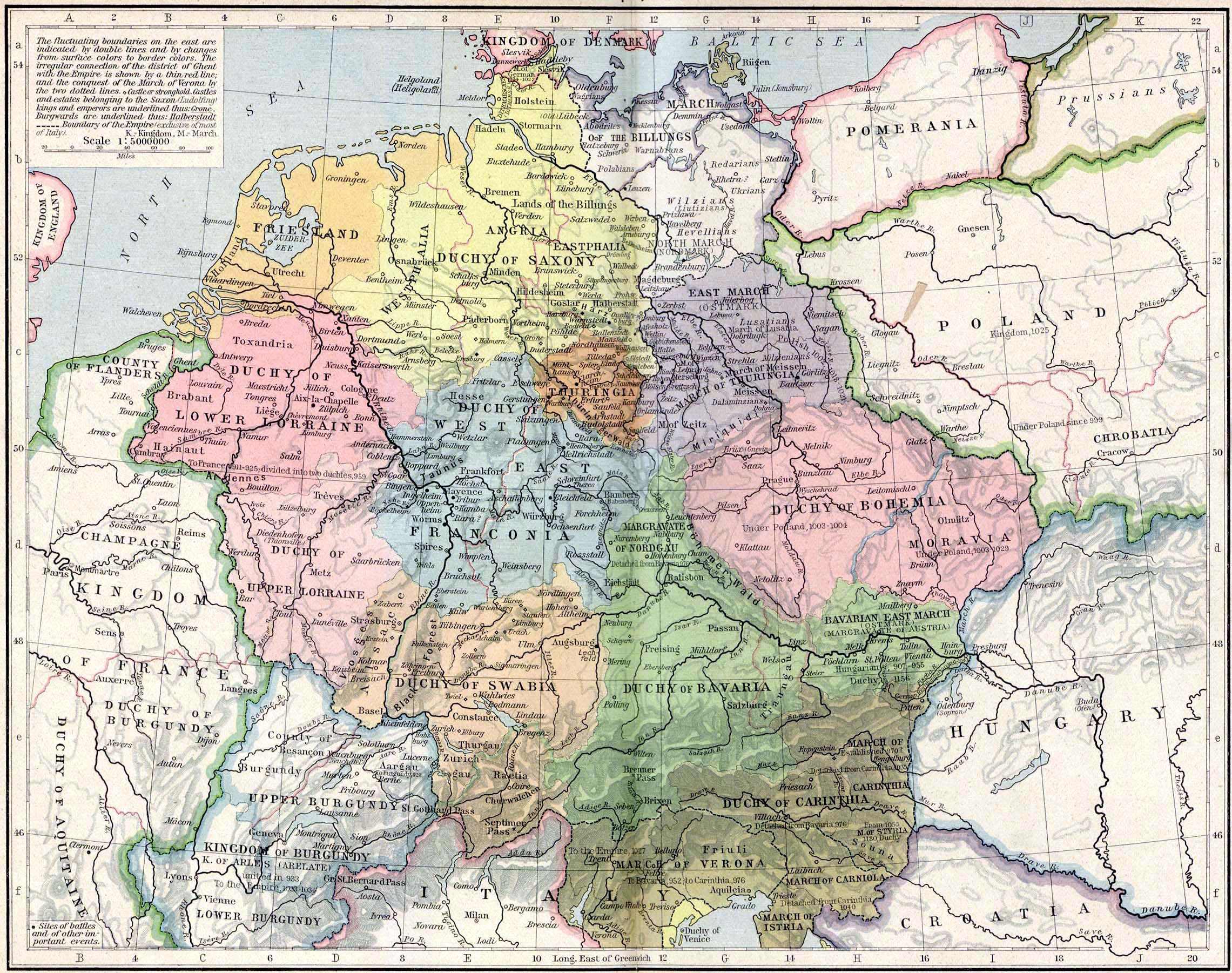
The East Frankish Kingdom (919–1125)

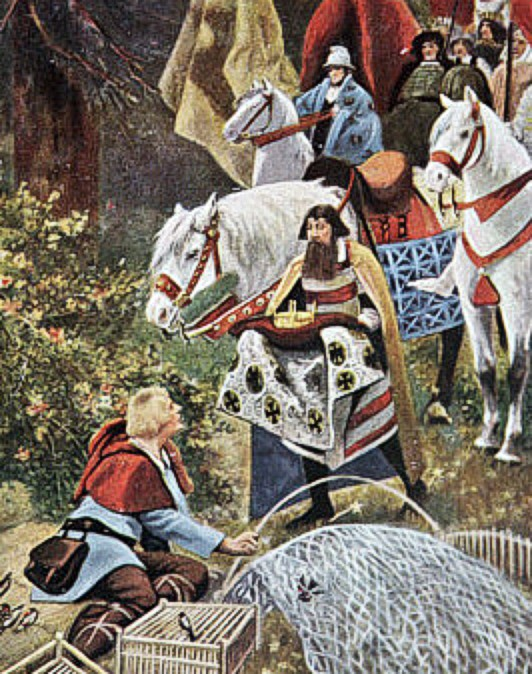
Henry the Fowler is offered the crown.

Year 919 (CMXIX) was a common year starting on Friday of the Julian calendar.

== Events ==
=== By Place ===
==== Byzantine Empire ====
- March 25 – Romanos Lekapenos, admiral (droungarios) of the Byzantine navy, seizes the Boukoleon Palace in Constantinople. He is named megas hetaireiarches (head of the imperial guard). Lekapenos consolidates his position and becomes regent of Emperor Constantine VII. He marries his 9-year-old daughter Helena Lekapene to Constantine and assumes the new title of basileopator (one of the highest offices in the Byzantine Empire).

==== Europe ====
- May 24 – The nobles of Franconia and Saxony elect Henry the Fowler at the Imperial Diet in Fritzlar as ruler of the East Frankish Kingdom. He recognizes the stem duchies (uniting them in a German confederation) and all their sovereign privileges. Two of the four most influential duchies, Bavaria and Swabia, do not accept his rule. Henry fortifies Magdeburg against the Magyars.
- Summer – Arnulf, Duke of Bavaria ("the Bad"), is elected as anti-king by the East-Frankish nobles in opposition to Henry I. Burchard II, duke of Swabia, submits to Henry's rule — allowing him to retain administrative control over his duchy. After an absence of nearly 15 years, the Magyars raid Bavaria and Northern Italy again, sacking the Po Valley (see Hungarian invasions of Europe).
- September 14 – Battle of Islandbridge: High King Niall Glúndub is killed while leading an Irish coalition against the Dublin-based Vikings of Uí Ímair, led by King Sitric Cáech.

==== Britain ====
- Lady Ælfwynn of the Mercians is brought to the court of her uncle, King Edward the Elder, and deprived of her authority in Mercia. Edward formally annexes the kingdom, ending independent Mercian rule.
- Ragnall ua Ímair, a Viking chief from Ireland, takes control of the Norse Kingdom of York (also referred to as Jórvik) and the English-ruled Earldom of Northumbria. He establishes himself as king at York.

==== Africa ====
- April 5 – The Fatimid Caliphate of Ifriqiya (modern-day Tunisia) launch the second Fatimid invasion of Egypt (919–921) in an attempt to seize Egypt from its Abbasid rulers. The expedition fails and the Fatimids will be forced to retreat.
- Following his death, Mara Takla Haymanot is succeeded by his eldest son Tatadim as ruler (negus) of the Zagwe Dynasty in Ethiopia.

==== China ====
- Battle of Langshan Jiang: The Wuyue navy (500 dragon ships) under Prince Qian Yuanguan who is preparing an invasion to attack the Wu Kingdom, defeats the naval forces of General Peng Yanzhang on the Yangtze River. Due to the use of flamethrower ships (using gunpowder to ignite petrol, like Greek fire) Qian Yuanguan manages to destroy 400 enemy ships and captures 7,000 prisoners.

==== Mesoamerica ====
- The Ancestral Puebloans, living in the Four Corners, begin construction at Pueblo Bonito, in modern-day New Mexico's Chaco Canyon (approximate date).

=== By topic ===
==== Religion ====
- The Bulgarian Orthodox Church is declared as autocephalous and elevated to the rank of patriarchate at an ecclesiastical council.

== Births ==
- January 29 – Shi Zong, emperor of the Liao Dynasty (d. 951)
- García I, king of Pamplona (d. 970)
- Li Cheng, Chinese painter (d. 967)
- Meng Chang, emperor of Later Shu (d. 965)
- Xu Jingqian, official and regent of Wu (d. 937)
- Theinhko, king of the Pagan dynasty (d. 956)

== Deaths ==
- January 28 – Zhou Dewei, Chinese general
- August 11 – Dhuka al-Rumi, Abbasid governor of Egypt
- August 28 – He Gui, Chinese general (b. 858)
- September 14 – Niall Glúndub, High King of Ireland
- December 18 – Lady Wu, wife of Qian Liu (b. 858)
- Justan III, ruler of the Justanid Dynasty (Iran)
- Khusrau Firuz, ruler of the Justanid Dynasty
- Mara Takla Haymanot, ruler of Ethiopia
- Solomon III, bishop of Constance
