= December 18 =

December 18 this year in various calendars
- Friday, 18 December 2026
Akan	Monofie
Armenian	1 Arach 1476
Aztec	Tozoztontli 17, 5 Itzcuintli
Babylonian	8 Kislimu, 2337 SE
Balinese pawukon	Menga, Kajeng, Menala, Wage, Maulu, Sukra of Wariga, Uma, Dadi, Pandita
Bengali	3 Poush, BS 1433
Chinese	Yang Fire Tiger・Ox Mansion; Fire Horse Year, Month 11, Day 10 (Daxue, 4 days until Dongzhi)
Common Era	18 December 2026 CE
Coptic	9 Koiak, AM 1743
Egyptian	6 Pachon, 2775 NE
Ethiopian	9 Tākḫśāś, 2019 Amätä Məhrät
French Republican	Décade III, Septidi de Frimaire de l'Année 235 de la République
Gregorian	18 December, AD 2026
Hebrew	8 Tevet, AM 5787
Hindu	Uttarabhādrapada・Vyatīpāta; Solar: 3 Pauṣa, 1948 SE; Lunisolar: Navamī, Śukla pakṣa of Mārgaśīrṣa, 2083 VE; Rāudra・5127 KY・1,872,927
Icelandic	Föstudagur, 26 Ýlir 2026
Islamic	8 Rajab, AH 1448 (using tabular method)
ISO week date	2026-W51-5
Japanese	10 Shimotsuki, Reiwa 8 (Taisetsu, 4 days until Tōji)
Julian	5 December, AD 2026 (AM 7535)
Julian day	2461393
Korean	10 Jwidal, 4359 DE
Maya	13.0.14.3.10; 3 Kankin, 5 Oc
Roman	Nonis Decembribus, MMDCCLXXIX AUC
Solar Hijri	27 Azar, SH 1405
Tibetan	9 mgo, me pho rta 2153 or 1772 or 1000

<<	December					>>
Su	Mo	Tu	We	Th	Fr	Sa
		1	2	3	4	5
6	7	8	9	10	11	12
13	14	15	16	17	18	19
20	21	22	23	24	25	26
27	28	29	30	31
2026

December 18 in recent years
2025 (Thursday)
2024 (Wednesday)
2023 (Monday)
2022 (Sunday)
2021 (Saturday)
2020 (Friday)
2019 (Wednesday)
2018 (Tuesday)
2017 (Monday)
2016 (Sunday)

December 18 is the 352nd day of the year (353rd in leap years) in the Gregorian calendar; 13 days remain until the end of the year.

== Events ==
=== Pre-1600 ===
- 1118 – The city of Zaragoza is conquered by king Alfonso I of Aragon from the Almoravid.
- 1271 – Kublai Khan renames his empire "Yuan" (元 yuán), officially marking the start of the Yuan dynasty of Mongolia and China.
- 1499 – A rebellion breaks out in Alpujarras in response to the forced conversions of Muslims in Spain.

=== 1601–1900 ===
- 1622 – Portuguese forces score a military victory over the Kingdom of Kongo at the Battle of Mbumbi in present-day Angola.
- 1655 – The Whitehall Conference ends with the determination that there was no law preventing Jews from re-entering England after the Edict of Expulsion of 1290.
- 1777 – The United States celebrates its first Thanksgiving, marking the recent victory by the American rebels over British General John Burgoyne at Saratoga in October.
- 1787 – New Jersey becomes the third state to ratify the U.S. Constitution.
- 1833 – The national anthem of the Russian Empire, "God Save the Tsar!", is first performed.
- 1854 – The Legislative Assembly of the Province of Canada abolishes the seigneurial system.
- 1865 – US Secretary of State William Seward proclaims the adoption of the Thirteenth Amendment, prohibiting slavery throughout the United States.
- 1867 – A magnitude 7.0 earthquakes strikes off the coast of Taiwan, triggering a tsunami and killing at least 580 people.
- 1878 – The Al-Thani family become the rulers of the state of Qatar.
- 1892 – The Nutcracker by Pyotr Ilyich Tchaikovsky premiers in Saint Petersburg, Russia.
- 1898 – Gaston de Chasseloup-Laubat sets the first officially recognized land speed record of 63.159 km/h (39.245 mph) in a Jeantaud electric car.

=== 1901–present ===
- 1916 – World War I: The Battle of Verdun ends when the second French offensive pushes the Germans back two or three kilometres, causing them to cease their attacks.
- 1917 – The resolution containing the language of the Eighteenth Amendment to enact Prohibition is passed by the United States Congress.
- 1932 – The Chicago Bears defeat the Portsmouth Spartans in the first NFL playoff game to win the NFL Championship.
- 1935 – The Lanka Sama Samaja Party is founded in Ceylon.
- 1939 – World War II: The Battle of the Heligoland Bight, the first major air battle of the war, takes place.
- 1944 – World War II: XX Bomber Command responds to the Japanese Operation Ichi-Go offensive by dropping five hundred tons of incendiary bombs on a supply base in Hankow, China.
- 1944 – The Supreme Court of the United States issued its decision in Korematsu v. United States supporting Franklin D. Roosevelt's Executive Order 9066 which cleared the way for the incarceration of nearly all 120,000 Japanese Americans, two-thirds of whom were U.S. citizens, born and raised in the United States.
- 1957 – A violent F5 tornado wipes out the entire community of Sunfield, Illinois.
- 1958 – Project SCORE, the world's first communications satellite, is launched.
- 1966 – Saturn's moon Epimetheus is discovered by astronomer Richard Walker.
- 1972 – Vietnam War: President Richard Nixon announces that the United States will engage North Vietnam in Operation Linebacker II, a series of Christmas bombings, after peace talks collapsed with North Vietnam on the 13th.
- 1973 – Soviet Soyuz Programme: Soyuz 13, crewed by cosmonauts Valentin Lebedev and Pyotr Klimuk, is launched from Baikonur in the Soviet Union.
- 1977 – United Airlines Flight 2860 crashes near Kaysville, Utah, killing all three crew members on board.
- 1977 – SA de Transport Aérien Flight 730 crashes near Madeira Airport in Funchal, Madeira, Portugal, killing 36.
- 1981 – First flight of the Russian heavy strategic bomber Tu-160, the world's largest combat aircraft, largest supersonic aircraft and largest variable-sweep wing aircraft built.
- 1995 – A Lockheed L-188 Electra crashes in Jamba, Cuando, Angola, killing 141 people.
- 1999 – NASA launches into orbit the Terra platform carrying five Earth Observation instruments, including ASTER, CERES, MISR, MODIS and MOPITT.
- 2002 – California gubernatorial recall: Then Governor of California Gray Davis announces that the state would face a record budget deficit of $35 billion, roughly double the figure reported during his reelection campaign one month earlier.
- 2005 – The Chadian Civil War begins when rebel groups, allegedly backed by neighbouring Sudan, launch an attack in Adré.
- 2006 – The first of a series of floods strikes Malaysia. The death toll of all flooding is at least 118, with over 400,000 people displaced.
- 2006 – United Arab Emirates holds its first-ever elections.
- 2015 – Kellingley Colliery, the last deep coal mine in Great Britain, closes.
- 2017 – Amtrak Cascades passenger train 501, derailed near DuPont, Washington, a city in United States near Olympia, Washington killing six people, and injuring 70 others.
- 2019 – The United States House of Representatives impeaches Donald Trump for the first time.
- 2022 – Argentina win the FIFA World Cup final, defeating title holders France 4–2 on penalties following a 3–3 draw after extra time.

== Births ==
=== Pre-1600 ===
- 1406 – Richard Olivier de Longueil, French Roman Catholic bishop and cardinal (died 1470)
- 1481 – Sophie of Mecklenburg, Duchess of Mecklenburg, Duchess of Saxony (died 1503)
- 1499 – Sebald Heyden, German musicologist and theologian (died 1561)
- 1505 – Philipp von Hutten, German explorer (died 1546)
- 1507 – Ōuchi Yoshitaka, Japanese daimyō (died 1551)
- 1552 – Ahmad Ibn al-Qadi, Moroccan writer, judge and mathematician (died 1616)
- 1590 – William Louis, Count of Nassau-Saarbrücken (died 1640)

=== 1601–1900 ===
- 1602 – Simonds d'Ewes, English historian and politician (died 1650)
- 1610 – Charles du Fresne, sieur du Cange, French philologist and historian (died 1688)
- 1620 – Heinrich Roth, German missionary and scholar (died 1668)
- 1624 – John Hull, colonial American merchant and politician (died 1683)
- 1626 – Christina, Queen of Sweden (died 1689)
- 1660 – Countess Johanna Magdalene of Hanau-Lichtenberg (died 1715)
- 1661 – Christopher Polhem, Swedish physicist and inventor (died 1751)
- 1662 – James Douglas, 2nd Duke of Queensberry, Scottish colonel and politician, Secretary of State for Scotland (died 1711)
- 1707 – Charles Wesley, English missionary and composer (died 1788)
- 1725 – Johann Salomo Semler, German historian and theologian (died 1791)
- 1734 – Jean-Baptiste Rey, French conductor and composer (died 1810)
- 1800 – James Watney, English brewer and businessman (died 1884)
- 1824 – John Hall, English-New Zealand politician, 12th Prime Minister of New Zealand (died 1907)
- 1825 – Charles Griffin, American general (died 1876)
- 1825 – John S. Harris, American surveyor and politician (died 1906)
- 1825 – Mariano Ignacio Prado, Peruvian general, twice President of Peru (died 1901)
- 1835 – Lyman Abbott, American minister, theologian, and author (died 1922)
- 1847 – Augusta Holmès, French pianist and composer (died 1903)
- 1849 – Henrietta Edwards, Canadian activist and author (died 1931)
- 1856 – J. J. Thomson, English physicist and academic, Nobel Prize laureate (died 1940)
- 1860 – Edward MacDowell, American pianist and composer (died 1908)
- 1861 – Lionel Monckton, English composer and critic (died 1924)
- 1863 – Archduke Franz Ferdinand of Austria (died 1914)
- 1867 – Foxhall P. Keene, American polo player and horse breeder (died 1941)
- 1869 – Edward Willis Redfield, American painter and educator (died 1965)
- 1870 – Saki, British short story writer (died 1916)
- 1873 – Francis Burton Harrison, American general and politician, 6th Governor-General of the Philippines (died 1957)
- 1875 – Matt McGrath, Irish-American hammer thrower (died 1941)
- 1878 – Joseph Stalin, Georgian-Russian marshal and politician,General Secretary of the Communist Party of the Soviet Union (died 1953)
- 1879 – Paul Klee, Swiss-German painter and educator (died 1940)
- 1882 – Richard Maury, American-Argentinian engineer, designed the Salta–Antofagasta railway (died 1950)
- 1884 – Emil Starkenstein, Czech pharmacologist, co-founded clinical pharmacology (died 1942)
- 1886 – Ty Cobb, American baseball player and manager (died 1961)
- 1887 – Bhikhari Thakur, Indian actor, singer, and playwright (died 1971)
- 1888 – Gladys Cooper, English actress and singer (died 1971)
- 1888 – Robert Moses, American urban planner (died 1981)
- 1890 – Edwin Howard Armstrong, American engineer, invented FM radio (died 1954)
- 1896 – Gerald Barry, English colonel and cricketer (died 1977)
- 1897 – Fletcher Henderson, American pianist and composer (died 1952)
- 1899 – Peter Wessel Zapffe, Norwegian philosopher and author (died 1990)

=== 1901–present ===
- 1904 – George Stevens, American director, producer, screenwriter, and cinematographer (died 1975)
- 1907 – Bill Holland, American race car driver (died 1984)
- 1907 – Lawrence Lucie, American guitarist and educator (died 2009)
- 1908 – Celia Johnson, English actress (died 1982)
- 1908 – Paul Siple, American geographer and explorer (died 1969)
- 1910 – Abe Burrows, American author, playwright, and director (died 1985)
- 1910 – Eric Tindill, New Zealand rugby player, cricketer, and umpire (died 2010)
- 1911 – Jules Dassin, American-Greek actor, director, producer, and screenwriter (died 2008)
- 1912 – Benjamin O. Davis, Jr., American general and pilot (died 2002)
- 1913 – Alfred Bester, American author and screenwriter (died 1987)
- 1913 – Willy Brandt, German politician, 4th Chancellor of Germany, Nobel Prize laureate (died 1992)
- 1913 – Ray Meyer, American basketball player and coach (died 2006)
- 1916 – Douglas Fraser, Scottish-American trade union leader and academic (died 2008)
- 1916 – Betty Grable, American actress, singer, and dancer (died 1973)
- 1917 – Ossie Davis, American actor and activist (died 2005)
- 1920 – Robert Leckie, American soldier and author (died 2001)
- 1922 – Jack Brooks, American colonel, lawyer, and politician (died 2012)
- 1922 – Esther Lederberg, American microbiologist (died 2006)
- 1923 – Edwin Bramall, Baron Bramall, English field marshal and politician, Lord Lieutenant of Greater London (died 2019)
- 1927 – Ramsey Clark, American lawyer and politician, 66th United States Attorney General (died 2021)
- 1927 – Roméo LeBlanc, Canadian journalist and politician, 25th Governor General of Canada (died 2009)
- 1928 – Mirza Tahir Ahmad, Indian-English caliph and author (died 2003)
- 1928 – Harold Land, American tenor saxophonist (died 2001)
- 1929 – Gino Cimoli, American baseball player (died 2011)
- 1929 – Józef Glemp, Polish cardinal (died 2013)
- 1930 – Moose Skowron, American baseball player (died 2012)
- 1931 – Allen Klein, American businessman and music publisher (died 2009)
- 1931 – Alison Plowden, English historian and author (died 2007)
- 1931 – Gene Shue, American basketball player, coach, and executive (died 2022)
- 1931 – Bill Thompson, American television host (died 2014)
- 1932 – Norm Provan, Australian rugby league player, coach, and businessman (died 2021)
- 1932 – Roger Smith, American actor, producer, and screenwriter (died 2017)
- 1933 – Lonnie Brooks, American blues singer and guitarist (died 2017)
- 1934 – Marc Rich, Belgian-American businessman, founded Glencore (died 2013)
- 1934 – Boris Volynov, Russian colonel, engineer, and cosmonaut
- 1935 – Rosemary Leach, English actress (died 2017)
- 1935 – Jacques Pépin, French-American chef and author
- 1936 – Malcolm Kirk, English rugby player and wrestler (died 1987)
- 1937 – Nancy Ryles, American politician (died 1990)
- 1938 – Chas Chandler, English bass player and producer (died 1996)
- 1938 – Joel Hirschhorn, American songwriter and composer (died 2005)
- 1939 – Pedro Jirón, Nicaraguan footballer (died 2018)
- 1939 – Michael Moorcock, English author and songwriter
- 1939 – Harold E. Varmus, American biologist and academic, Nobel Prize laureate
- 1940 – Ilario Castagner, Italian football manager (died 2023)
- 1940 – John Cooper, English sprinter and hurdler (died 1974)
- 1941 – Sam Andrew, American singer-songwriter and guitarist (died 2015)
- 1941 – Wadada Leo Smith, American trumpet player and composer
- 1941 – Joan Wallach Scott, American historian, author, and academic
- 1942 – Lenore Blum, American mathematician and academic
- 1942 – Bobby Keyes, Australian rugby league player (died 2022)
- 1943 – Bobby Keys, American saxophone player (died 2014)
- 1943 – Keith Richards, English musician
- 1943 – Alan Rudolph, American director and screenwriter
- 1944 – Crispian Steele-Perkins, English trumpet player and educator
- 1945 – Jean Pronovost, Canadian ice hockey player and coach
- 1946 – Steve Biko, South African activist, founded the Black Consciousness Movement (died 1977)
- 1946 – Steven Spielberg, American director, producer, and screenwriter, co-founded DreamWorks
- 1947 – Leonid Yuzefovich, Russian author and screenwriter
- 1948 – George T. Johnson, American basketball player
- 1948 – Bill Nelson, English singer-songwriter and guitarist
- 1948 – Mimmo Paladino, Italian sculptor and painter
- 1948 – Laurent Voulzy, French-English singer-songwriter and guitarist
- 1949 – David A. Johnston, American volcanologist and geologist (died 1980)
- 1950 – Gillian Armstrong, Australian director, producer, and screenwriter
- 1950 – Randy Castillo, American drummer and songwriter (died 2002)
- 1950 – Sarath Fonseka, Sri Lankan general and politician
- 1950 – Lizmark, Mexican wrestler (died 2015)
- 1950 – Leonard Maltin, American historian, author, and critic
- 1951 – Bobby Jones, American basketball player
- 1952 – John Leventhal, American songwriter and producer
- 1953 – Kevin Beattie, English footballer (died 2018)
- 1953 – Elliot Easton, American guitarist and singer
- 1954 – John Booth, English race car driver
- 1954 – Ray Liotta, American actor (died 2022)
- 1954 – Willi Wülbeck, German runner
- 1955 – Vijay Mallya, Indian businessman and politician
- 1955 – Bogusław Mamiński, Polish runner
- 1956 – T. K. Carter, American actor (died 2026)
- 1956 – Ron White, American comedian
- 1957 – Jonathan Cainer, English astrologer and author (died 2016)
- 1958 – Geordie Walker, English guitarist (died 2023)
- 1958 – Julia Wolfe, American composer and educator
- 1960 – Kazuhide Uekusa, Japanese economist and academic
- 1960 – Naoko Yamano, Japanese singer, guitarist and composer
- 1961 – Brian Orser, Canadian figure skater and coach
- 1961 – Lalchand Rajput, Indian cricketer
- 1961 – Leila Steinberg, American singer, producer, author, and poet
- 1961 – Angie Stone, American singer, songwriter, and actress (died 2025)
- 1963 – Greg D'Angelo, American drummer
- 1963 – Karl Dorrell, American football player and coach
- 1963 – Pierre Nkurunziza, Burundian soldier and politician, 9th President of Burundi (died 2020)
- 1963 – Charles Oakley, American basketball player and coach
- 1963 – Brad Pitt, American actor and producer
- 1964 – Stone Cold Steve Austin, American professional wrestler and producer
- 1964 – Don Beebe, American football player and coach
- 1965 – Shawn Christian, American actor, director, and screenwriter
- 1965 – Manolo Peña, Spanish footballer (died 2012)
- 1966 – Gianluca Pagliuca, Italian footballer and sportscaster
- 1967 – Mille Petrozza, German singer-songwriter and guitarist
- 1967 – Toine van Peperstraten, Dutch journalist
- 1968 – Mario Basler, German footballer and manager
- 1968 – Rachel Griffiths, Australian actress
- 1968 – Alejandro Sanz, Spanish singer-songwriter and guitarist
- 1968 – Casper Van Dien, American actor and producer
- 1969 – Santiago Cañizares, Spanish footballer
- 1969 – Justin Edinburgh, English footballer and manager (died 2019)
- 1969 – Akira Iida, Japanese race car driver
- 1970 – Norman Brown, American singer and guitarist
- 1970 – DMX, American rapper and actor (died 2021)
- 1970 – Lucious Harris, American basketball player
- 1970 – Giannis Ploutarhos, Greek singer-songwriter
- 1970 – Rob Van Dam, American wrestler
- 1970 – Jonathan Yeo, English painter
- 1971 – Barkha Dutt, Indian journalist
- 1971 – Noriko Matsueda, Japanese pianist and composer
- 1971 – Arantxa Sánchez Vicario, Spanish tennis player and sportscaster
- 1972 – Anzhela Balakhonova, Ukrainian pole vaulter
- 1972 – Raymond Herrera, American drummer and songwriter
- 1972 – DJ Lethal, Latvian-American musician
- 1972 – Lawrence Wong, Singaporean civilist and politician, 4th Prime Minister of Singapore
- 1973 – Fatuma Roba, Ethiopian runner
- 1974 – Peter Boulware, American football player and politician
- 1974 – Knut Schreiner, Norwegian singer, guitarist, and producer
- 1975 – Randy Houser, American singer-songwriter and guitarist
- 1975 – Sia, Australian singer-songwriter
- 1975 – Trish Stratus, Canadian wrestler and actress
- 1977 – Axwell, Swedish DJ, record producer, member of Swedish House Mafia
- 1977 – Claudia Gesell, German runner
- 1978 – Daniel Cleary, Canadian ice hockey player
- 1978 – Ali Curtis, American soccer player
- 1978 – Josh Dallas, American actor
- 1978 – Katie Holmes, American actress
- 1980 – Christina Aguilera, American singer-songwriter, producer, and actress
- 1980 – Neil Fingleton, English actor and basketball player, one of the tallest 25 men in the world (died 2017)
- 1980 – Benjamin Watson, American football player
- 1983 – Andy Fantuz, Canadian football player
- 1984 – Brian Boyle, American ice hockey player
- 1984 – Paul Harrison, English footballer
- 1984 – Giuliano Razzoli, Italian skier
- 1984 – Derrick Tribbett, American bass player and singer
- 1986 – Chris Carter, American baseball player
- 1986 – François Hamelin, Canadian speed skater
- 1986 – Usman Khawaja, Pakistani-Australian cricketer
- 1987 – Miki Ando, Japanese figure skater
- 1988 – Lizzie Deignan, English cyclist
- 1988 – Seth Doege, American football player
- 1988 – Brianne Theisen-Eaton, Canadian heptathlete
- 1988 – Imad Wasim, Pakistani cricketer
- 1989 – Ashley Benson, American actress and singer
- 1990 – Victor Hedman, Swedish ice hockey player
- 1990 – Sierra Kay, American singer-songwriter
- 1991 – Marcus Butler, English model and YouTuber
- 1992 – Ryan Crouser, American shot putter
- 1992 – Kristen Faulkner, American road cyclist
- 1992 – Bridgit Mendler, American singer-songwriter and actress
- 1993 – Byron Buxton, American baseball player
- 1993 – Thomas Lam, Finnish footballer
- 1994 – Gerard Gumbau, Spanish footballer
- 1994 – Natália Kelly, American-Austrian singer
- 1995 – Barbora Krejčíková, Czech tennis player
- 1995 – Lim Na-young, South Korean singer and actress
- 1995 – Mads Pedersen, Danish road cyclist
- 1996 – Caileigh Filmer, Canadian rower
- 1997 – Ronald Acuña Jr., Venezuelan baseball player
- 1997 – Alex DeBrincat, American ice hockey player
- 1998 – Paola Egonu, Italian volleyball player
- 1998 – Simona Quadarella, Italian swimmer
- 1998 – Klaudia Zwolińska, Polish slalom canoeist
- 1999 – Dorka Juhász, Hungarian basketball player
- 2000 – Jayden Daniels, American football player
- 2000 – Korapat Kirdpan, Thai actor and singer
- 2000 – Travon Walker, American football player
- 2001 – Billie Eilish, American singer
- 2001 – Jalen Johnson, American basketball player
- 2002 – Syd Hartha, Filipino singer-songwriter
- 2002 – Giuliano Simeone, Argentine footballer

== Deaths ==
=== Pre-1600 ===
- 919 – Lady Wu, wife of Qian Liu (born 858)
- 933 – Yaonian Yanmujin, Chinese empress dowager
- 1075 – Edith of Wessex, Queen Consort of the English (born 1025)
- 1133 – Hildebert, French poet and scholar (born 1055)
- 1290 – Magnus Ladulås, king of Sweden (born 1240)
- 1442 – Pierre Cauchon, French Catholic bishop (born 1371)
- 1495 – Alfonso II of Naples (born 1448)
- 1577 – Anna of Saxony, Princess consort of Orange (born 1544)

=== 1601–1900 ===
- 1645 – Nur Jahan, empress consort of the Mughal Empire (born 1577)
- 1651 – William Brabazon, 1st Earl of Meath, English lawyer and politician (born 1580)
- 1692 – Veit Ludwig von Seckendorff, German scholar and politician (born 1626)
- 1737 – Antonio Stradivari, Italian instrument maker (born 1644)
- 1787 – Soame Jenyns, English poet and politician (born 1704)
- 1799 – Jean-Étienne Montucla, French mathematician and historian (born 1725)
- 1803 – Johann Gottfried Herder, German philosopher, theologian, and poet (born 1744)
- 1829 – Jean-Baptiste Lamarck, French soldier, biologist, and academic (born 1744)
- 1843 – Thomas Graham, 1st Baron Lynedoch, Scottish-English general and politician (born 1748)
- 1848 – Bernard Bolzano, Bohemian priest and mathematician (born 1781)
- 1864 – José Justo Corro, Mexican politician, President of Mexico (1836–1837) (born 1794)
- 1869 – Louis Moreau Gottschalk, American pianist and composer (born 1829)
- 1880 – Michel Chasles, French mathematician and academic (born 1793)
- 1892 – Richard Owen, English biologist, anatomist, and paleontologist (born 1804)

=== 1901–present ===
- 1919 – John Alcock, English captain and pilot (born 1892)
- 1922 – Sir Carl Meyer, 1st Baronet, German-English banker and businessman (born 1851)
- 1925 – Hamo Thornycroft, English sculptor and academic (born 1850)
- 1931 – Louis Billot, French Catholic cardinal (born 1846)
- 1932 – Eduard Bernstein, German theorist and politician (born 1850)
- 1936 – Andrija Mohorovičić, Croatian meteorologist and seismologist (born 1857)
- 1939 – Ernest Lawson, Canadian-American painter (born 1873)
- 1961 – Leo Reisman, American violinist and bandleader (born 1897)
- 1969 – Charles Dvorak, American pole vaulter and coach (born 1878)
- 1971 – Bobby Jones, American golfer and lawyer (born 1902)
- 1971 – Diana Lynn, American actress (born 1926)
- 1972 – Neilia Hunter Biden, first wife of Joe Biden (born 1942)
- 1973 – Allamah Rasheed Turabi, Indian-Pakistani religious leader and philosopher (born 1908)
- 1974 – Harry Hooper, American baseball player, coach, and manager (born 1887)
- 1975 – Theodosius Dobzhansky, Ukrainian geneticist and biologist (born 1900)
- 1977 – Michio Nishizawa, Japanese baseball player and manager (born 1921)
- 1977 – Louis Untermeyer American poet, anthologist, critic (born 1885)
- 1980 – Dobriša Cesarić, Croatian poet and translator (born 1902)
- 1980 – Alexei Kosygin, Russian soldier and politician, 8th Premier of the Soviet Union (born 1904)
- 1982 – Hans-Ulrich Rudel, German colonel and pilot (born 1916)
- 1985 – Xuân Diệu, Vietnamese poet and author (born 1916)
- 1987 – Conny Plank, German keyboard player and producer (born 1940)
- 1988 – Niyazi Berkes, Turkish Cypriot-English sociologist and academic (born 1908)
- 1990 – Anne Revere, American actress (born 1903)
- 1990 – Paul Tortelier, French cellist and composer (born 1914)
- 1990 – Joseph Zubin, Lithuanian-American psychologist and academic (born 1900)
- 1991 – George Abecassis, English race car driver (born 1913)
- 1992 – Mark Goodson, American game show producer, created Family Feud and The Price Is Right (born 1915)
- 1993 – Helm Glöckler, German race car driver (born 1909)
- 1993 – Sam Wanamaker, American-English actor, director, and producer (born 1919)
- 1994 – Roger Apéry, Greek-French mathematician and academic (born 1916)
- 1994 – Lilia Skala, Austrian-American actress (born 1896)
- 1995 – Brian Brockless, English organist, composer, and conductor (born 1926)
- 1995 – Ross Thomas, American author (born 1926)
- 1995 – Konrad Zuse, German engineer, designed the Z3 computer (born 1910)
- 1996 – Yulii Borisovich Khariton, Russian physicist and academic (born 1904)
- 1996 – Irving Caesar, American composer (born 1895)
- 1997 – Chris Farley, American comedian and actor (born 1964)
- 1998 – Lev Dyomin, Russian colonel, pilot, and astronaut (born 1926)
- 1999 – Robert Bresson, French director and screenwriter (born 1901)
- 2000 – Stan Fox, American race car driver (born 1952)
- 2000 – Randolph Apperson Hearst, American businessman (born 1915)
- 2000 – Kirsty MacColl, British singer-songwriter (born 1959)
- 2001 – Gilbert Bécaud, French singer-songwriter, pianist, and actor (born 1927)
- 2001 – Dimitris Dragatakis, Greek violinist and composer (born 1914)
- 2001 – Marcel Mule, French saxophonist and educator (born 1901)
- 2002 – Necip Hablemitoğlu, Turkish historian and academic (born 1954)
- 2002 – Ray Hnatyshyn, Canadian lawyer and politician, 24th Governor General of Canada (born 1934)
- 2002 – Wayne Owens, American lawyer and politician (born 1937)
- 2002 – Lucy Grealy, Irish-American author (born 1963)
- 2004 – Anthony Sampson, English journalist and author (born 1926)
- 2005 – Alan Voorhees, American engineer and urban planner (born 1922)
- 2006 – Joseph Barbera, American animator, director, and producer, co-founded Hanna-Barbera (born 1911)
- 2006 – Ruth Bernhard, German-American photographer (born 1905)
- 2006 – Shaukat Siddiqui, Pakistani author and activist (born 1923)
- 2007 – Hans Billian, Polish-German actor, director, and screenwriter (born 1918)
- 2007 – Gerald Le Dain, Canadian lawyer and judge (born 1924)
- 2007 – William Strauss, American author and playwright (born 1947)
- 2007 – Alan Wagner, American businessman and critic (born 1931)
- 2008 – Majel Barrett, American actress and producer (born 1932)
- 2008 – Mark Felt, American FBI agent, "Deep Throat" informant in the Watergate scandal (born 1913)
- 2010 – Phil Cavarretta, American baseball player and manager (born 1916)
- 2010 – Jacqueline de Romilly, French philologist, author, and scholar (born 1913)
- 2010 – Tommaso Padoa-Schioppa, Italian economist and politician, Italian Minister of Economy and Finances (born 1940)
- 2010 – James Pickles, English judge and journalist (born 1925)
- 2011 – Václav Havel, Czech poet, playwright, and politician, 1st President of the Czech Republic (born 1936)
- 2012 – Frank Macchiarola, American lawyer and academic (born 1941)
- 2012 – Mustafa Ould Salek, Mauritanian colonel and politician, President of Mauritania (born 1936)
- 2012 – Jim Whalen, American football player (born 1943)
- 2012 – Anatoliy Zayaev, Ukrainian footballer, coach, and manager (born 1931)
- 2013 – Ken Hutcherson, American football player (born 1952)
- 2013 – Graham Mackay, South African-English businessman (born 1949)
- 2014 – Donald J. Albosta, American soldier and politician (born 1925)
- 2014 – Gideon Ben-Yisrael, Israeli soldier and politician (born 1923)
- 2014 – Larry Henley, American singer-songwriter (born 1937)
- 2014 – Virna Lisi, Italian actress (born 1936)
- 2014 – Mandy Rice-Davies, English model and actress, central figure in the Profumo affair (born 1944)
- 2014 – Robert Simpson, American meteorologist and author (born 1912)
- 2015 – Luc Brewaeys, Belgian pianist, composer, and conductor (born 1959)
- 2015 – Helge Solum Larsen, Norwegian businessman and politician (born 1969)
- 2016 – Zsa Zsa Gabor, Hungarian-American actress and socialite (born 1917)
- 2017 – Kim Jong-hyun, South Korean singer (born 1990)
- 2020 – Jerry Relph, American politician and member of the Minnesota Senate (born 1944)
- 2021 – Sayaka Kanda, Japanese actress and singer (born 1986)
- 2024 – Slim Dunlap, American singer-songwriter and guitarist (born 1951)
- 2024 – John Marsden, Australian writer (born 1950)
- 2025 – Jim Hunt, American politician, 69th and 71st Governor of North Carolina (born 1937)
- 2025 – Osman Hadi, Bangladeshi politician and activist (born 1993)

== Holidays and observances ==
- Christian feast day:
  - Expectation of the Blessed Virgin Mary
  - Flannán
  - Gatianus of Tours
  - O Adonai
  - Sebastian (Eastern Orthodox Church)
  - Winibald
  - December 18 (Eastern Orthodox liturgics)
- International Migrants Day
- National Day (Qatar)
- Republic Day (Niger)
- UN Arabic Language Day (United Nations)
