= Wu Hanyue =

Lady Wu Hanyue (吳漢月) (913 – July 17, 952), formally the Lady Dowager Gongyi of Wuyue (吳越國恭懿太夫人), was the mother of Qian Chu (King Zhongyi, né Qian Hongchu), the fifth and final king of the Chinese state Wuyue of the Five Dynasties and Ten Kingdoms period.

== Background ==
Lady Wu was born in 913, by which time Wuyue was an independent state under the rule of its first king, Qian Liu. She was from Qiantang (錢塘, in modern Hangzhou, Zhejiang) and was a daughter of the officer Wu Ke (吳珂). She was a concubine of Qian Hongchu's father, Wuyue's second king Qian Yuanguan (King Wenmu) (whose wife was Lady Ma). She gave birth to his ninth son, Qian Hongchu, in 929.

== Biography ==
It was said that she was much favored by Qian Yuanguan's wife Lady Ma, and that she was good at playing the guqin. She was also said to be kind and frugal, and a follower of Taoism, such that whenever she heard of Qian Yuanguan carrying out severe punishments, her face would be saddened.

In 947, Qian Hongchu's older brother, then-king Qian Hongzong (King Wenxun), was deposed by the general Hu Jinsi. Hu made Qian Hongchu king, It was said that whenever Qian Hongchu wanted to promote his mother's family members, Lady Wu would urge against it, and whenever she met her family members, she would encourage them to do good and rebuke them if they did not, so while she was alike, there were no improper actions taken by the Wu family members. In 949, Emperor Yin of Later Han, to whom Qian Hongchu was formally a vassal, created her the Lady Dowager Shunde of Wuyue. She died in 952. Then-reigning Emperor Taizu of Later Zhou honored her and gave her the posthumous name of Gongyi ("respectful and benevolent").
