= Qian Hongzun =

Qian Hongzun (錢弘僔) (925 – June 7, 940), formally Heir Apparent Xiaoxian (孝獻世子, "the filial and wise heir apparent"), was an heir apparent to the throne of the Chinese Five Dynasties and Ten Kingdoms Period state Wuyue during most of the reign of his father Qian Yuanguan (né Qian Chuanguan, King Wenmu), but did not inherit the throne on account of his predeceasing his father.

== Background ==
Qian Hongzun was born in 925. He was the fifth son of his father Qian Chuanguan, who then was still serving under his father (Qian Hongzun's grandfather), Wuyue's first king Qian Liu (King Wusu), as the acting military governor (Jiedushi) of Wuyue's two main circuits, Zhenhai (鎮海, headquartered at Wuyue's capital Hang Prefecture (杭州, in modern Hangzhou, Zhejiang)) and Zhendong (鎮東, headquartered in modern Shaoxing, Zhejiang). His mother was Qian Chuanguan's concubine Lady Fu. While he was ranked as Qian Chuanguan's fifth son, traditional histories heavily implied that he was the first-born in terms of Qian Chuanguan's biological sons, as they emphasized that Qian Chuanguan and his wife Lady Ma were sonless and that, therefore, Qian Chuanguan was sonless into his 30s because Qian Liu had forbidden officials from taking concubines, until Lady Ma personally pleaded for an exemption for Qian Chuanguan due to that reason — and listing Qian Hongzun among the biological sons born from Qian Chuanguan's concubines, while omitting his older brothers Qian Hongzhuan (錢弘僎), Qian Hongxuan (錢弘儇), Qian Hongyou (錢弘侑), and Qian Hong'an (錢弘侒), although only Qian Hongyou was explicitly stated to be an adoptive son and explicitly stated to have the birth name of Sun. (After Qian Hongzun's death, his father would (at least in words) consider the possibility of passing the throne to a member of another branch of the Qian clan before affirming the heir status of Qian Hongzun's younger brother Qian Hongzuo, further suggesting that he did not consider his four older sons to truly be members of his clan.)

== During Qian Yuanguan's reign ==
In 932, Qian Liu died. Qian Chuanguan took control of the state (and changed his name to Qian Yuanguan), but did not claim the title of king at that time, but only the military governor of Zhenhai and Zhendong, as a vassal to Later Tang of the Central Plains. Qian Hongzun received the title of deputy military governor of Zhenhai and Zhendong, and military prefect (團練使, Tuanlianshi) of Guo Prefecture (果州, in modern Nanchong, Sichuan — a completely honorary title as Guo was then under the control of Later Shu). In 937, by which time Later Tang had fallen and Wuyue was a vassal state of Later Jin, Qian Yuanguan assumed the title of king. He created Qian Hongzun as his heir apparent, and had a mansion built for Qian Hongzun. Qian Hongzun, however, would die in 940, before his father, who would eventually pass the throne to Qian Hongzuo.

== Notes and references ==
- Spring and Autumn Annals of the Ten Kingdoms, vol. 83.
- Zizhi Tongjian, vols. 281, 282.
