= Ma Chuo =

Ma Chuo (馬綽)

Personal details
- Born: early 850s Yuhang, Hang Prefecture, Tang dynasty
- Died: c. 923 (aged 69–70); Wuyue
- Spouse: Lady Qian (錢)
- Children: Queen Ma

Ma Chuo
- Traditional Chinese: 馬綽
- Simplified Chinese: 马绰
Transcriptions
Standard Mandarin
- Hanyu Pinyin: Mǎ Chuò

Ma Chuo (died 922 or after) was a general and official of the Wuyue kingdom during the Five Dynasties period. He was very close to Wuyue's founder Qian Liu.

Ma Chuo married one of Qian Liu's cousins, and one daughter married Qian Liu's son and eventual successor Qian Yuanguan.

== During Tang dynasty ==
Like Qian Liu (who was of similar age), Ma Chuo was a Hang Prefecture native who joined the warlord Dong Chang in the mid-870s. One time, Dong Chang asked Qian Liu to take a roll call of his soldiers, but the roster was missing. Qian Liu was able to remember every name from memory, but Ma Chuo warned him to be careful with the mistrustful Dong Chang. Ma Chuo then provided a stack of paper for Qian Liu to use as the "roster book" so as not to fuel Dong Chang's mistrust. Qian Liu appreciated Ma Chuo's goodwill, and not long after Ma Chuo married Qian Liu's younger paternal cousin.

In 886, Qian Liu captured Yue Prefecture from warlord Liu Hanhong for Dong Chang. Soon Dong Chang moved to Yue Prefecture, with Ma Chuo following him, while Qian Liu became the prefect of Hang Prefecture. In March 895, Dong Chang declared himself an emperor of a new state in Yue Prefecture, after killing every staff member who dared to speak against it. At that time Qian Liu was stationed in Hang Prefecture, and Ma Chuo abandoned his family to join Qian Liu, who soon marched towards Yue Prefecture to fight his former lord. In 896, Qian Liu extinguished Dong Chang and took over his territory.

Ma also played a key role in quashing the rebellion of Xu Wan and Xu Zaisi in 902.

== During Wuyue ==
Ma Chuo held the following offices during the Wuyue kingdom:

- Military Vice Commissioner of Zhenhai Circuit
- Prefect of Mu Prefecture
- Military Commissioner of Xiongwu Circuit
- Grand Mentor
- Grand councilor
- Acting Grand Commandant (awarded in 922 before his death)
