= Lady Chen (Wusu) =

Lady Chen (陳夫人, personal name unknown), formally the Lady Dowager Zhaoyi of Jin (晉國昭懿太夫人), was the mother of Qian Yuanguan (King Wenmu) (né Qian Chuanguan, name changed to Qian Yuanguan upon his succession to the throne), the second king of the Chinese state Wuyue of the Five Dynasties and Ten Kingdoms period.

Little is known about Lady Chen's background. She was a concubine of Qian Chuanguan's father, Wuyue's first king Qian Liu (King Wusu) (whose wife was Lady Wu). She gave birth to his seventh son, Qian Chuanguan, in 887. Qian Chuanguan was designated Qian Liu's heir in 928, and that year, Qian Liu, with permission from Emperor Mingzong of Later Tang, whom Qian Liu was a vassal of, transferred the title of military governor (Jiedushi) of Zhenhai (鎮海, headquartered in modern Hangzhou, Zhejiang) and Zhendong (鎮東, headquartered in modern Shaoxing, Zhejiang) — which made up the vast majority of Wuyue's territory — to Qian Chuanguan, while remaining king himself. It is unclear what title, if any, Lady Chen carried during Qian Liu's lifetime.

Qian Liu died in 932, and Qian Chuanguan took over administration of the state (and changed his name to Qian Yuanguan), although for some time did not use the title of King of Wuyue but instead referred to himself by the military governor title (and, in succession, the Later Tang-bestowed titles of Prince of Wu and Prince of Yue) when reporting to Later Tang, to whom Wuyue was a vassal. (He would assume the king title only years after Lady Chen's death, in 937.) It was said that Qian Yuanguan was respectful and filially pious toward his mother. He also treated her family well, presenting them with many gifts, but never gave them offices on account of her. She died in the early Qingtai era (934-936) of the Later Tang emperor Li Congke and was posthumously created the Lady Dowager of Jin, with the posthumous name of Zhaoyi ("accomplished and benevolent").
