= Lady Ma (Qian Yuanguan's wife) =

Chinese queen

Lady Ma (馬夫人, personal name unknown) (890 – November 28, 939), formally the Lady Gongmu of Wuyue (吳越國恭穆夫人), was a wife of Qian Yuanguan (King Wenmu) (né Qian Chuanguan, name changed to Qian Yuanguan upon his succession to the throne), the second king of the Chinese state Wuyue of the Five Dynasties and Ten Kingdoms period.

== Background ==
Lady Ma was born in 890, during the reign of Emperor Zhaozong of Tang. Her father Ma Chuo was an officer serving under Qian Liu, a warlord who then controlled the region around Hang Prefecture (杭州, in modern Hangzhou, Zhejiang), who would eventually found Wuyue as King Wusu. (She was said to be from Anguo County (安國), which might have been referring to Qian Liu's hometown Yijin Base (衣錦軍, in modern Hangzhou), as it was also known as Anguo Yijin Base.) Ma Chuo was, either by familial relations or by personal relations, was very close to Qian, as, because of those relations, he married one of Qian's younger sisters. At some point, Qian also took Lady Ma to be the wife of his son Qian Chuanguan. (Qian Chuanguan had been forced to marry the daughter of another late-Tang warlord, Tian Jun the military governor of Ningguo Circuit (寧國, headquartered in modern Xuancheng, Anhui) as a political marriage and was taken to Ningguo, in 902, and was not able to return to Qian Liu's domain until Tian's downfall in 903, so his marriage to Lady Ma would have come after.)

== Marriage to Qian Yuanguan ==
As Qian Chuanguan's wife, Lady Ma was said to be intelligent, wise, and diligent. During Qian Liu's reign, he banned officials from having concubines. As Qian Chuanguan and Lady Ma did not have any sons even past the age of 30, Lady Ma became concerned. She went to her father-in-law Qian Liu to ask for an exemption on Qian Chuanguan's behalf. Qian Liu responded to her happily, "My family's future bloodline is in your hands." He thus allowed Qian Chuanguan to have concubines, and they bore him a large number of sons, whom Lady Ma treated as her own sons. She had a silver deer made and placed before her seat, and was accustomed to happily watch the children play on and around it.

Over the years, apparently after Qian Chuanguan succeeded Qian Liu upon Qian Liu's death in 932 (at which time he changed his name to Qian Yuanguan), Lady Ma received titles from the emperors of Later Tang and the subsequent Later Jin, whom Qian Yuanguan was formally a vassal to. She was initially created the Lady of Yue, and later Lady Zhuangmu of Wuyue. She died in 939, while Qian Yuanguan was still king, and was posthumously honored by Emperor Gaozu of Later Jin as Lady Gongmu ("respectful and solemn").

== Notes and references ==
- Zizhi Tongjian, vol. 282.
- Spring and Autumn Annals of the Ten Kingdoms (十國春秋), vol. 83.

Chinese nobility
Preceded by Lady Wu	Lady Consort of Wuyue; 937–939	Succeeded by Lady Xu Xinyue
Preceded by Empress Liu of Later Tang	Wife to the Sovereign of China (Zhejiang); 937–939	Succeeded by Lady Xu Xinyue
