= Lady Wu (Qian Liu's wife) =

Lady Wu (吳夫人, personal name unknown) (858– December 18, 919), formally Lady Zhuangmu of Wuyue (吳越莊穆夫人), was the wife of Qian Liu (King Wusu), the first king of the Chinese state Wuyue of the Five Dynasties and Ten Kingdoms period.

== Background ==
Lady Wu was born in 858, during the reign of Emperor Xuānzong. Her family was from Anguo (安國, in modern Hangzhou, Zhejiang). Her father was one Wu Zhongxin (吳仲忻), who had served on the staff of a governor (觀察使, Guanchashi) of Zhexi Circuit (浙西, then-headquartered in modern Zhenjiang, Jiangsu).

== Marriage to Qian Liu ==
It is not known exactly when Lady Wu married Qian Liu — but it must be before his rise to prominence, because it was said that at that time, the people in Wu Zhongxin's household opposed the marriage proposal from Qian on the basis that he did not care for property management. Wu Zhongxin's older brother, however, believed in Qian's talent and agreed to the marriage proposal. It was said that after they became married, Lady Wu organized the household well and was filially pious to his parents. As Qian had an impatient and harsh disposition, she often tried to moderate his temper by her tender advice. She bore 13 of Qian's 38 sons, although the only son that was clearly known to be born by her was his third son Qian Chuanying (錢傳瑛), and his eventual successor Qian Yuanguan was not her son but that of his concubine Lady Chen. However, she was said to be loving to all of his sons, including the ones that she did not bear. For example, when Qian Yuanguan was forced by circumstances to serve as a hostage from Qian Liu to Tian Jun the military governor of Ningguo Circuit (寧國, headquartered in modern Xuancheng, Anhui) in 902, she wept bitterly and worried about the dangers that Qian Yuanguan would be in.

Through Qian Liu's career, initially as a vassal of Tang dynasty and later as a vassal of Tang's succeeding dynasty Later Liang, Lady Wu also received increasingly honorable titles — Lady of Yan, then Lady of Jin, and finally Lady Zhengde of Wuyue. She often visited Fengguo Temple (奉國寺), and Qian put aside silk for her to be able to donate to monks. However, she pointed out that this was a high expenditure that the state could not afford, and declined it on that basis. She was also accustomed to visit Qian's hometown Yijin Base (衣錦軍, in modern Hangzhou) every spring.

Lady Wu died in 919, while Qian Liu was still reigning (and serving as a vassal of the Later Liang emperor Zhu Zhen). She was given the posthumous name of Zhuangmu ("victorious and solemn").

== Notes and references ==
Chinese nobility
Preceded by None (kingdom founded)	Lady Consort of Wuyue; 907-919	Succeeded by Lady Ma
Preceded by Empress He of the Tang dynasty	Consort to Sovereign of China (Zhejiang) (de facto); 907-919	Succeeded by Lady Ma
Preceded by Empress He of the Tang dynasty	Consort to Sovereign of China (Zhejiang) (de jure); 907-919	Succeeded by Empress Cao of Later Tang
