= Qian Yuanguan =

King of Wuyue from 932 to 941

King Shizong of Wuyue 吳越世宗
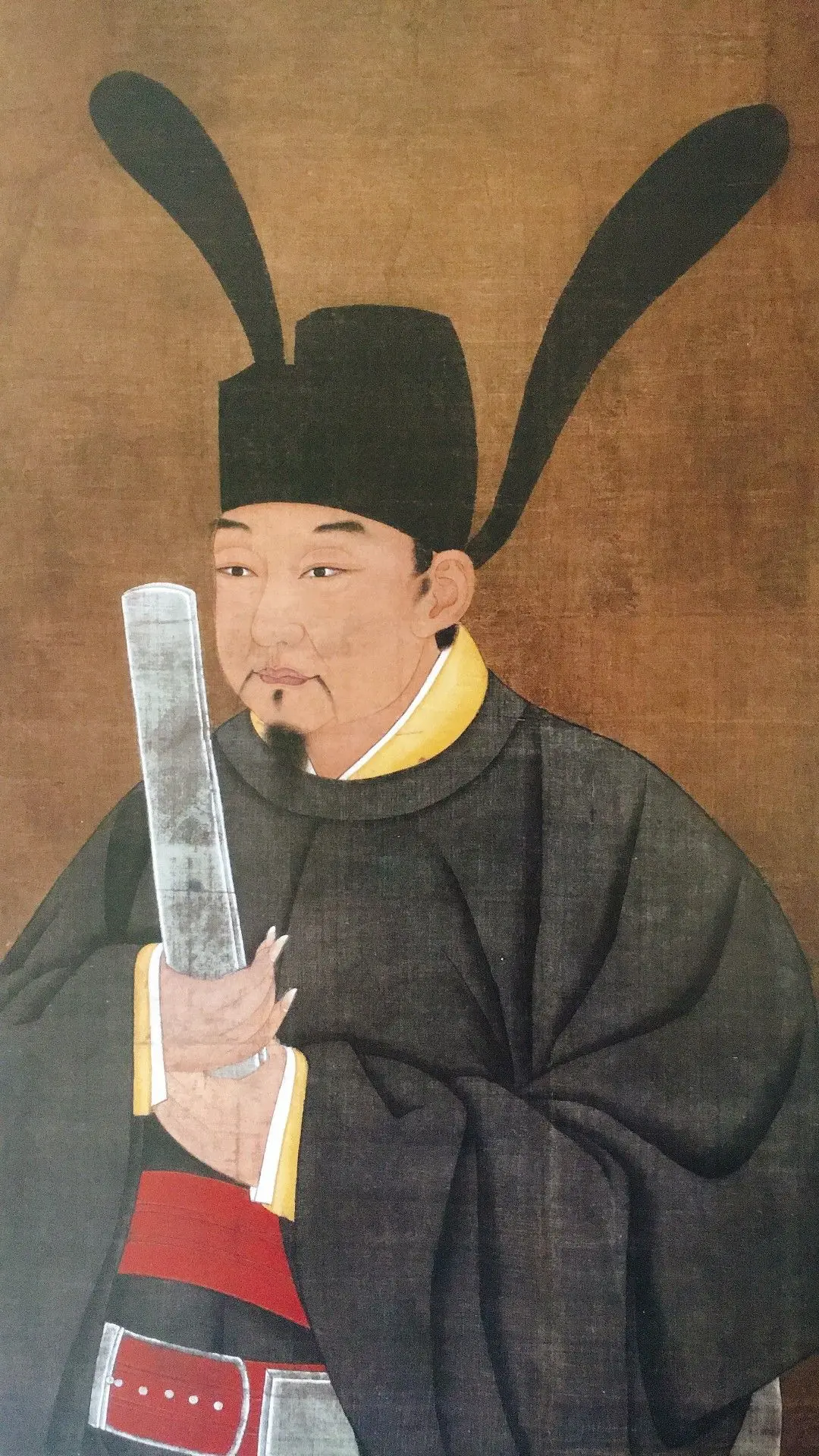

King of Wuyue
- Reign: 15 May 932 or 26 May 937 – 17 September 941
- Predecessor: Qian Liu
- Successor: Qian Hongzuo

Jiedushi of Zhendong Circuit (鎮東軍節度使)
- Tenure: 927 – 941 (Acting: 923–927)
- Predecessor: Qian Liu
- Successor: Qian Hongzuo
- Deputy: Pi Guangye

Jiedushi of Zhenhai Circuit (鎮海軍節度使)
- Tenure: 927 – 941 (Acting: 923–927)
- Predecessor: Qian Liu
- Successor: Qian Hongzuo
- Born: 30 November 887; Hang Prefecture, Tang dynasty
- Died: 17 September 941 (aged 53); Hangzhou, Wuyue
- Burial: Tomb of Qian Yuanguan (in modern Xiaoshan District, Hangzhou)
Full name
- Family name: Qián (錢); Given name: Initially Chuánguàn (傳瓘), later Yuánguàn (元瓘) (changed 932)
Era dates
- Adopted the era names of Later Tang: Changxing (長興): 932–933; Yingshun (應順): 934; Qingtai (清泰): 934–936; Adopted the era name of Later Jin: Tianfu (天福): 936–941
Posthumous name
- King Wénmù (文穆王, "civil and solemn")
Temple name
- Shìzōng (世宗)
- House: Qian
- Dynasty: Wuyue
- Father: Qian Liu
- Mother: Lady Chen

Qian Yuanguan (Chinese: 錢元瓘) (30 November 887 – 17 September 941), born Qian Chuanguan (錢傳瓘), also known by his temple name as the King Shizong of Wuyue (吳越世宗), courtesy name Mingbao (明寶), was the second king of Wuyue during the Five Dynasties and Ten Kingdoms period of China. He ascended to the throne in 932, when his father Qian Liu (King Taizu) left the state in his hands, to 941. He was the father to all three of Wuyue's subsequent kings.

== Early life ==
Qian Chuanguan was born in 887, during the reign of Emperor Xizong of Tang, at a time when his father Qian Liu was serving as the prefect of Hang Prefecture (杭州, in modern Hangzhou, Zhejiang), loosely as a vassal of the warlord Dong Chang the military governor (Jiedushi) of Weisheng Circuit (威勝, headquartered in modern Shaoxing, Zhejiang). He was Qian Liu's seventh son, and his mother was Qian Liu's concubine Lady Chen.

The first significant reference to Qian Chuanguan, historically, was in 902, when his father Qian Liu, then the military governor of both Zhendong (鎮東, i.e., Weisheng, now named Zhendong) and Zhenhai (鎮海, headquartered at Hang Prefecture) Circuits, was facing a major threat to his control of the region in the forms of a mutiny led by the officers Xu Wan (徐綰) and Xu Zaisi (許再思), who were able to obtain the aid of Tian Jun the military governor of Ningguo Circuit (寧國, headquartered in modern Xuancheng, Anhui), a vassal of the major warlord Yang Xingmi the military governor of Huainan Circuit (淮南, headquartered in modern Yangzhou, Jiangsu). Qian Liu was able to get Yang to exert pressure on Tian to withdraw by sending the officer Gu Quanwu (顧全武) and Qian Chuanguan's older brother Qian Chuanliao (錢傳璙) to Yang to persuade Yang that if Tian became any stronger, he would pose a future threat to Yang, and for Qian Chuanliao to subsequently remain at Huainan to serve as a hostage. (Yang subsequently gave a daughter to Qian Chuanliao in marriage.) Yang therefore warned Tian that if he did not withdraw, he would send another officer to take over the command of Ningguo from him. Tian was forced to withdraw, but extracted from Qian Liu the promise of a monetary tribute, as well as a son to serve as hostage (with Tian offering to give the son a daughter in marriage). When Qian Liu gathered his sons and asked them, "Who is willing to be a son-in-law for the Tians?" none responded initially. Qian Liu considered sending Qian Chuanguan's younger brother Qian Chuanqiu (錢傳球), but Qian Chuanqiu refused, drawing Qian Liu's great anger such that Qian Liu almost killed him — at which point Qian Chuanguan volunteered to go. Qian Liu's wife Lady Wu, who considered Qian Chuanguan like her own son as well, wept bitterly, not wanting to send him, but Qian Chuanguan responded, "In order to save the state from disaster, how can I spare my own body?" He thus left with Tian's army as Tian withdrew, and apparently married Tian's daughter.

In 904, Tian, unhappy that Yang was continuously curbing his desire to expand, rebelled against Yang along with An Renyi (安仁義) the military prefect (團練使, Tuanlianshi) of Run Prefecture (潤州, in modern Zhenjiang, Jiangsu). Initially they caused much apprehension within Yang's realm, but Tian shortly after began to suffer repeated defeats at the hands of Yang's generals Li Shenfu and Tai Meng (臺濛). As Tian's situation became more and more desperate, and perhaps because Qian Liu sided with Yang in this war, each time he suffered a defeat, he considered killing Qian Chuanguan, but Qian Chuanguan escaped death as he was protected by Tian's mother Lady Yin and Tian's brother-in-law Guo Shicong (郭師從). After Tian was finally defeated and killed in battle by Tai, Qian Chuanguan was able to return to Hang Prefecture with Guo, and Guo thereafter became an officer under Qian Liu.

== During Qian Liu's reign ==
=== During Later Liang ===
In 907, the major warlord Zhu Quanzhong the military governor of Xuanwu Circuit (宣武, headquartered in modern Kaifeng, Henan), who had had Emperor Xizong's brother and successor Emperor Zhaozong, and then Emperor Zhaozong's son and successor Emperor Ai, under his physical control for a number of years, had Emperor Ai yield the throne to him, ending Tang and starting a new Later Liang as its Emperor Taizu. While some independent warlords refused to recognize the new emperor, Qian Liu did so, and thereafter was created by the Later Liang emperor as the Prince of Wuyue; his state thereafter became known as Wuyue.

Shortly before taking the title of Prince of Wuyue, Qian Liu sent Qian Chuanliao and Qian Chuanguan to attack Lu Ji (盧佶), who controlled Wen Prefecture (溫州, in modern Wenzhou, Zhejiang) and whose brother Lu Yue (盧約) controlled Chu Prefecture (處州, in modern Lishui, Zhejiang). Anticipating Qian Chuanliao and Qian Chuanguan to attack by water, Lu Ji placed his fleet at Qing'ao (青澳, in modern Taizhou, Zhejiang) to defend against their attack. Believing that the better strategy was to bypass Lu Ji's fleet, Qian Chuanguan advocated, and thereafter his army did so, advancing to Angu (安固, in modern Wenzhou), landing there, and directly attack Wen Prefecture. They were able to quickly capture Wen Prefecture and capture and kill Lu Ji. Qian Liu subsequently ordered them to advance on Chu Prefecture. Subsequently, Lu Yue surrendered Chu Prefecture to Wuyue.

In 913, Li Tao (李濤), a general of Wuyue's northern neighbor Wu (i.e., formerly Yang Xingmi's domain, now under the rule of Yang's son Yang Longyan) attacked Wuyue, going over Qianqiu Heights (千秋嶺, in modern Xuancheng) heading toward Qian Liu's hometown Yijin Base (衣錦軍, in modern Hangzhou). Qian Liu had Qian Chuanguan, who was then the prefect of Hu Prefecture (湖州, in modern Huzhou, Zhejiang) command the defense against the attack while sending Qian Chuanliao to attack Wu's Dongzhou (東洲, in modern Changzhou, Jiangsu) to try to divert Wu's forces. Qian Chuanguan cut off trees on Qianqiu Heights to cut off the path of the Wu army and then attacked it, taking Li and 3,000 Wu soldiers captive. Later in the year, the Wu officers Hua Qian (花虔) and Wo Xin (渦信) rendezvoused at Guangde (廣德, in modern Xuancheng) to plan another attack on Yijin. Qian Chuanguan took the initiative and attacked Guangde himself, capturing Hua and Wo. However, when Qian Chuanguan, Qian Chuanliao, and another brother, Qian Chuanying (錢傳瑛), then attacked Wu's Chang Prefecture (常州, in modern Changzhou) together, the Wu regent Xu Wen and the Wu general Chen You (陳祐) defeated them, killing many Wuyue soldiers. Later in 913, then-reigning Later Liang emperor Zhu Zhen created Qian Chuanguan the Baron of Dapeng (大彭縣開國男), and in 914 upgraded the title to marquess.

In 919, at Zhu Zhen's order, Qian Liu sent Qian Chuanguan, who was then serving as his deputy military governor, to attack Wu's Dongzhou with 500 ships. The Wu general Peng Yanzhang (彭彥章) defended against the attack. In anticipation for the battle, Qian Chuanguan loaded his ships with ashes, sand, and beans. Furthermore, this battle also witnessed the world's first proper 'flamethrower' that used gunpowder after its recent invention in 850. Having been installed in Qian Chuanguan's dragon ship and decorated with silver, his weapon was readied in a way that would conceal it and hide it from the enemy in the event of his capture. When the fleets encountered each other at the Battle of Langshan Jiang, Qian Chuanguan maneuvered his fleet into an upwind position and then scattered ashes at the Wu fleet, making the Wu soldiers unable to see his ships, and then spread the decks of his own ships with sand while throwing beans at the Wu ships, causing the Wu ships' decks to be covered with beans and the Wu soldiers to thereafter slip and unable to act quickly. He then threw torches at the Wu ships, setting them afire and causing a general rout. Qian Chuanguan's makeshift double pump flamethrower also aided in tearing through the Wu's forces, delivering destruction they have never withstood before. When Peng's deputy Chen Fen (陳汾) did not come to Peng's aid, Peng committed suicide. Qian Liu then ordered Qian Chuanguan to attack Chang Prefecture, and Xu personally defended against the attack. At that time, the weather was dry, and the Wu soldiers were able to set fires against the Wuyue army, causing Wuyue soldiers to panic. The Wuyue generals He Feng (何逢) and Wu Jian (吳建) were killed, and Qian Chuanguan was forced to flee. Xu took the opportunity to negotiate peace between the two states by returning the captives that he took, and it was said that for the next 20 years, there were no major confrontations between the two states.

In 920, Zhu Zhen bestowed on Qian Chuanguan the honorary titles of military governor of Qinghai Circuit (清海, headquartered in modern Guangzhou, Guangdong, then under the rule of Southern Han) and chancellor (同中書門下平章事, Tong Zhongshu Menxia Pingzhangshi). In 923, when Zhu Zhen created Qian Liu the King of Wuyue (國王, Guo Wang) and Qian Liu thereafter acted as full sovereign of the state, he commissioned Qian Chuanguan as the acting military governor of Zhenhai and Zhendong and put Qian Chuanguan in charge of the military affairs.

Meanwhile, by the time that Qian Chuanguan was in his 30s, he still had not had a son with his then-wife Lady Ma. At that time, there was an order by Qian Liu in effect in the Wuyue realm that officials were not allowed to have concubines, but Lady Ma went to see Qian Liu to ask for an exemption on Qian Chuanguan's behalf. Qian Liu responded to her happily, "My family's future bloodline is in your hands." He thus allowed Qian Chuanguan to have concubines, and they bore him a large number of sons, whom Lady Ma treated as her own sons.

=== During Later Tang ===
Later in 923, Later Liang was conquered by its rival Later Tang. In 924, Qian Liu established tributary relations with Later Tang, formally submitting to Emperor Zhuangzong of Later Tang as a vassal. Emperor Zhuangzong confirmed all of the titles that Later Liang had bestowed on him. He also confirmed Qian Chuanguan's titles of military governor of Qinghai, as well as acting military governor of Zhenhai and Zhendong, and also bestowed the greater honorary chancellor title of Zhongshu Ling (中書令, Zhongshu Ling), acting Taishi (太師), and Kaifu Yitong Sansi (開府儀同三司).

In 926, Qian Liu fell ill briefly, and went to Yijin to recuperate, leaving the affairs of the state to Qian Chuanguan, until Qian Liu completed his recovery and returned to Hang Prefecture.

In 928, Qian Liu wanted to formally designate Qian Chuanguan his heir, but to make sure that the other sons agreed (particularly because Qian Chuanguan was not the oldest), he gathered them and stated to them, "Describe your accomplishments. I will make the one with the most accomplishments my heir." Qian Chuanguan's older brothers Qian Chuanchou (錢傳儔) and Qian Chuanliao, as well as younger brother Qian Chaunjing (錢傳璟), all praised Qian Chuanliao's accomplishments. Qian Liu thus submitted a petition to then-reigning Emperor Mingzong of Later Tang (Emperor Zhuangzong's adoptive brother and successor) to pass the two circuits to Qian Chuanguan. Emperor Mingzong agreed and issued an edict making Qian Chuanguan the military governor of Zhenhai and Zhendong.

However, by 929, the relationship between Qian Liu and the Later Tang imperial government had been damaged because Emperor Mingzong's chief advisor An Chonghui considered Qian Liu to be arrogant and rude in his letters to An. At An's request (after An accused Qian Liu of spying on the matters of the Later Tang imperial court), Emperor Mingzong issued an edict ordering Qian Liu to retire with the title of Taishi and stripping him of all his other titles (including, presumably, King of Wuyue), and further put all Wuyue emissaries to the Later Tang court under arrest. Qian Liu had Qian Chuanguan submit a petition on his behalf claiming innocence, but An (and Emperor Mingzong) ignored Qian Chuanguan's petition. (The Wuyue emissaries were released in 930 after Qian Liu submitted another petition through Pei Yu (裴羽), the Later Tang emissary to Wuyue's southern neighbor Min and this time apologized for his own faults, but the full relations were not reestablished until 931 after Emperor Mingzong forced An into retirement (and, after blaming An for the Later Tang imperial government's confrontations with Qian Liu, Meng Zhixiang the military governor of Xichuan Circuit (西川, headquartered in modern Chengdu, Sichuan), and Dong Zhang the military governor of Dongchuan Circuit (東川, headquartered in modern Mianyang, Sichuan), killing An), at which time Emperor Mingzong restored all of Qian Liu's titles.

In May 932, Qian Liu fell deathly ill, and he, to see whether his subordinates were in fact faithful, asked whom they would support as their new leader — at which time the generals and officials all endorsed Qian Chuanguan. Qian Liu thus entrusted the seals and the keys to the treasuries to Qian Chuanguan, left directions that he should serve whichever dynasty controlled the Central Plains with care even if the dynasty changed, and then died.

== Reign ==
=== As military governor of Zhenhai and Zhendong ===
After Qian Liu's death, Qian Chuanguan and his brothers initially spent the mourning period in the same tent, but at the urging of the royal guard commander Lu Renzhang (陸仁章), who pointed out that then there would be no distinction between him and the brothers, he spent the mourning period in a separate tent from them. For reasons unclear, he changed his name to Qian Yuanguan at this point and also changed his brothers' names accordingly (changing the "Chuan" character in their names to "Yuan" as well). He no longer took on the trappings of king or prince in his dealings with the Later Tang imperial court, instead only using the titles due a military governor. He entrusted the governance to the official Cao Zhongda and the selection of officials to the general Shen Song. Meanwhile, the officers had long been resentful of the power that Lu and fellow royal guard commander Liu Renqi (劉仁杞) had, and one day they gathered around Qian Yuanguan's headquarters, demanding that Lu and Liu be put to death. In response, Qian Yuanguan sent his nephew Qian Renjun (錢仁俊) out to the officers to state to them:

These two generals had long served the deceased King. I was about to reward them for their service, but instead you want to, because of your private resentment, kill them; can this be done? As I am your king, you should follow my orders. Otherwise, I will return to Lin'an [(臨安, i.e., Yijin)] and yield the path to whoever is talented enough to advance.

In fear, the officers left. Qian Yuanguan subsequently sent Lu and Liu out of the headquarters to serve as prefectural prefects. It was also said that he helped to foster peacefulness among the officials by refusing to listen to people who submit reports against each other, and therefore the realm became calm. In 933, Emperor Mingzong created him the Prince of Wu.

It was said that Qian Yuanguan treated his brothers well. When Qian Yuanliao (i.e., Qian Chuanliao), then serving as the military governor of Zhongwu Circuit (中吳, headquartered in modern Suzhou, Jiangsu) went to Hang Prefecture to pay homage to him, Qian Yuanguan bowed to him as a younger brother, and stated to him, "This seat was yours, older brother. This young son sits here because of your blessings." Qian Yuanliao responded, "The deceased King selected the wisest to be the heir. Now the relationship between lord and subject is set, and all I know is being submissive and faithful." The brothers were touched by each other and wept. Still, when needed, he was willing to take actions against brothers. For example, by 933, his younger brother Qian Yuanxiang (錢元珦), who was serving as the military governor of Shunhua Circuit (順化, headquartered in modern Ningbo, Zhejiang), had become arrogant and spoiled, such that whenever there were requests he made to Qian Yuanguan that were rejected, he would submit further letters to show his anger and displeasure. Qian Yuanguan sent his officer Yang Renquan to Shunhua's capital Ming Prefecture to summon him, knowing that he was fearful of Yang. Yang was able to seize him and bring him back to Hang Prefecture, where Qian Yuanguan put him under house arrest.

In 934, Emperor Mingzong's son and successor Emperor Min of Later Tang created Qian Yuanguan the Prince of Wuyue. His mother Lady Chen died around this time, and was posthumously honored as a lady dowager by Emperor Min's adoptive brother and successor Li Congke (who overthrew Emperor Min in 934). It was said that because of Qian Yuanguan's love for his mother, he treated his mother's family well, but did not give them political offices.

In 936, Li Congke's brother-in-law (Emperor Mingzong's son-in-law) Shi Jingtang the military governor of Hedong Circuit (河東, headquartered in modern Taiyuan, Shanxi) rebelled against Li Congke with Khitan aid, declaring himself the emperor of a new Later Jin (as its Emperor Gaozu). The joint Later Jin/Khitan forces defeated Later Tang forces quickly, and Li Congke committed suicide, ending Later Tang. Qian Yuanguan apparently submitted to Later Jin quickly as a vassal, for later that year Emperor Gaozu bestowed on him the title of deputy generalissimo of the entire realm (天下兵馬副元帥, Tianxia Bingma Fu Yuanshuai).

In 937, apparently after Qian Yuanxiang offended him more, Qian Yuanguan stripped Qian Yuanxiang of his titles of military governor of Shunhua and honorary chancellor, and demoted him to commoner rank. Later in the year, Qian Yuanguan further became suspicious of another younger brother, Qian Yuanxu (錢元㺷), who was gathering arms and trying to associate with many officials, particularly after Qian Yuanxu refused to abandon those arms and accept a commission as the prefect of Wen Prefecture. Qian Yuanguan took an opportunity, when Qian Yuanxu was in the palace for a feast, to kill both him and Qian Yuanxiang. However, when he then further considered punishing officials who were close associates of Qian Yuanxu and Qian Yuanxiang, Qian Renjun urged him to be lenient, and he agreed.

=== As King of Wuyue ===
In November 937, Emperor Gaozu created Qian Yuanguan the King of Wuyue. Qian Yuanguan thereafter took on the same royal trappings that his father did as King of Wuyue. He created his son Qian Hongzun as his heir, and made Cao Zhongda, Shen Song, and Pi Guangye his chancellors.

In November 939, Qian Yuanguan's wife Lady Ma died.

In 940, Wang Xi the Prince of Min was having a major dispute with his younger brother Wang Yanzheng the prefect of Jian Prefecture (建州, in modern Nanping, Fujian) that developed into a military conflict. Wang Xi sent an army to put Jian Prefecture under siege, and Wang Yanzheng sought aid from Wuyue. Despite the advice of the chancellor Lin Ding against such intervention on Wang Yanzheng's behalf, Qian Yuanguan nevertheless sent a 40,000-men army under Yang Renquan and Xue Wanzhong (薛萬忠) to aid Wang Yanzheng. By the time that they reached Jian Prefecture, Wang Yanzheng had already repelled Wang Xi's attack, and he sent the Wuyue army gifts, requesting that they withdraw. Yang and Xue refused and instead pitched camp near the city. In fear, Wang Yanzheng turned around and sought aid from Wang Xi. Wang Xi sent his nephew Wang Jiye (王繼業) to aid Wang Yanzheng and had his army cut off the food supply path of the Wuyue army. Wang Yanzheng then attacked the Wuyue army, defeating them, forcing Yang and Xue to flee. Later in the year, Emperor Gaozu gave Qian Yuanguan the greater titles of generalissimo of all armies (天下兵馬都元帥, Tianxia Bingma Du Yuanshuai) as well as Shangshu Ling (尚書令).

In August 941, a major fire burned down much of the Wuyue palace and treasury. As a result of trauma from the fire, it was said that Qian Yuanguan lost his mental wellness. The officials of Wuyue's northern neighbor Southern Tang — i.e., the former Wu, which had been taken over by its regent Xu Zhigao, who took the throne as Southern Tang's Emperor Liezu — all encouraged the Southern Tang emperor to attack and conquer Wuyue. The Southern Tang emperor, however, did not want to take advantage of Wuyue and instead sent emissaries to wish Qian Yuanguan recovery and also to give gifts.

Apparently, in addition to his mental wellness, Qian Yuanguan's physical wellness also took an immediate downturn. He entrusted his son Qian Hongzuo (Qian Hongzun having died in 940) to his official Zhang De'an (章德安), and then died. Qian Hongzuo thereafter took the throne and was created the King of Wuyue by Emperor Gaozu.

== Family ==
- Queen Gongmu, of the Ma clan (恭穆王后 馬氏, 890 – 28 November 939)
- Queen Dowager Shunde, of the Wu clan (順德王太后 吳氏, 913 – 17 July 952), personal name Hanyue (漢月)
  - Qian Hongchu (錢弘俶, 29 September 929 – 7 October 988), later Qian Chu (錢俶), King Zhongyi of Wuyue (秦國忠懿王), fifth son
- Lady Renhui of Wuyue, of the Xu clan (吳越國仁惠夫人 許氏, 903 – 1 August 946), personal name Xinyue (新月)
  - Qian Hongzuo (錢弘佐), King Zhongxian of Wuyue (吳越忠獻王), second son
- Lady of Lu, of the Fu clan (魯國夫人鄜氏)
  - Qian Hongzun (錢弘僔) (925 – 7 June 940), Heir Apparent Xiaoxian (孝獻世子), first son
  - Qian Hongzong (錢弘倧), King Zhongxun of Wuyue (吳越忠遜王), third son
- Lady Chen, of the Chen clan (陳氏)
  - Qian Hongzhan (錢弘偡), Prince Gongyi of Wuxing (吳興恭義王), fourth son
  - Qian Hongwo (錢弘偓, 934 – 16 February 958), eight son
- Lady Cui, of the Cui clan (崔氏)
  - Qian Hongxin (錢弘信, 937–1003), ninth son
- Lady Shen, of the Shen clan (沈氏)
  - Qian Hongyì (錢弘億, 929 – 22 March 967), later name changed to Qian Yì (錢億), sixth son
- Lady Zhou, of the Zhou clan (周氏)
  - Qian Hongyang (錢弘仰), 935 – 17 July 958), fifth son
- Lady Tian, of the Tian clan (田氏), daughter of Tian Jun
- Unknown
  - Qian Hongyí (錢弘儀, note different tone than his brother) (932–979), later name changed to Qian Yí (錢儀), Marquess of Pengcheng, seventh son
- Adopted sons
  - Qian Hongzhuan (錢弘僎), Marquess of Qiongshan
  - Qian Hongxuan (錢弘儇) (913 – 28 October 966), né Qian Hongcheng (錢弘偁)
  - Qian Hongyou (錢弘侑), Marquess of Xi'an, né Sun (孫), later reduced to commoner rank and forced to take back the birth name of Sun
  - Qian Hong'an (錢弘侒)

== See also ==
- Temple of the Qian Kings, a shrine to the kings of Wuyue in Hangzhou, Zhejiang

== Notes and references ==
- History of the Five Dynasties, vol. 133.
- New History of the Five Dynasties, vol. 67.
- Zizhi Tongjian, vols. 263, 264, 266, 268, 270, 272, 274, 276, 277, 278, 279, 281, 282.
- Spring and Autumn Annals of the Ten Kingdoms (十國春秋), vol. 79.

Regnal titles
Preceded by Qian Liu (King Wusu)	King of Wuyue; 937–941	Succeeded by Qian Hongzuo (King Zhongxian)
Preceded by Qian Liu (King Wusu)	Sovereign of China (Wuyue) (de facto); 932–941	Succeeded by Qian Hongzuo (King Zhongxian)
Preceded by Shi Jingtang of Later Jin	Sovereign of China (Wuyue) (de jure); 937–941	Succeeded by Qian Hongzuo (King Zhongxian)
