= Qian Liu =

King of Wuyue from 907 to 932

King Taizu of Wuyue 吳越太祖
- Ruler of Wuyue (more...)
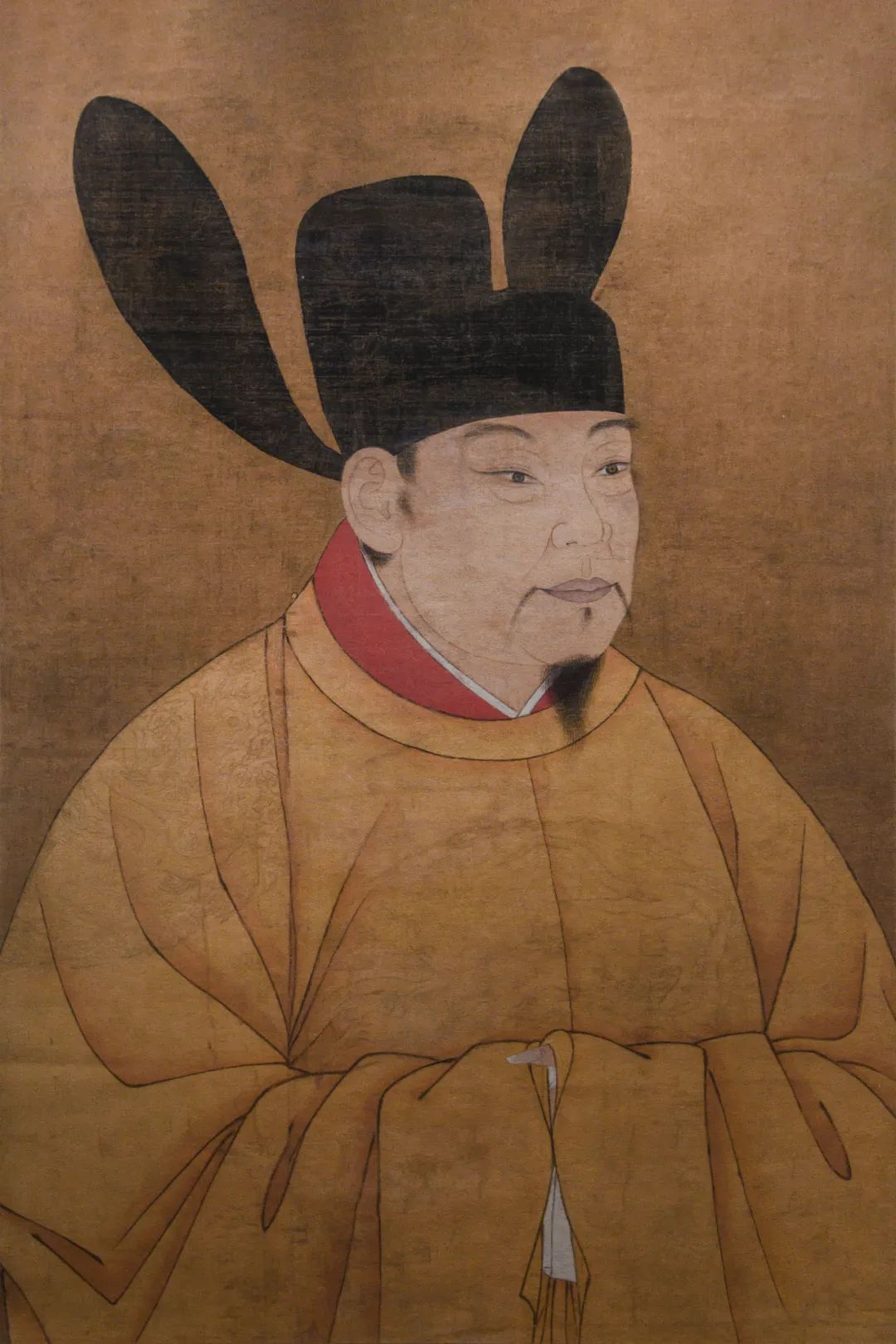

King of Wuyue
- Reign: 907 (Note: When Qian Liu's "reign" began depends on one's perspective. The traditional view uses 907 because that was the end of the Tang dynasty, when the empire was considered to have splintered into many parts, with Qian's Wuyue state being one and because Zhu Wen (Emperor Taizu of Later Liang) created him the Prince of Wuyue that year. Other potential dates are 902 (when Qian was created the Prince of Yue (越王)), 908 (when Qian began to use his era name of Tianbao rather than Emperor Taizu's Kaiping era name), or 923 (when Emperor Taizu's successor Zhu Youzhen created Qian the Guowang of Wuyue (吳越國王) and exempted him from referring to himself as the Jiedushi of the two circuits under his control).) – May 6, 932
- Successor: Qian Yuanguan

Jiedushi of Zhendong Circuit (鎮東軍節度使)
- Tenure: 907–928
- Predecessor: Wang Tuan
- Successor: Qian Yuanguan

Jiedushi of Zhenhai Circuit (鎮海軍節度使)
- Tenure: 893–928
- Predecessor: Li Chan
- Successor: Qian Yuanguan
- Born: Qian Poliu; March 10, 852; Lin'an, Hang Prefecture, Tang dynasty
- Died: May 6, 932 (aged 80); Wuyue
- Burial: Tomb of Qian Liu (in modern Lin'an District, Hangzhou)
- Spouse: Lady Wu
Era dates
- Tiānyòu (天祐): 907 (Note: Adopted the era name of Tang. 907 was the 4th year of Tiānyòu.); Tiānbǎo (天寶): 908–912; Fènglì (鳳曆): (Note: Adopted the era name of Later Liang.) 913; Qiánhuà (乾化): 913–915; Zhēnmíng (貞明): 915–921; Lóngdé (龍德): 921–923; Bǎodà (寶大): 924–925; Bǎozhèng (寶正): 926–931
Posthumous name
- King Wǔsù (武肅王, "martial and solemn")
Temple name
- Taìzǔ (太祖; "Grand Progenitor")
- House: Qian
- Dynasty: Wuyue
- Father: Qian Kuan
- Mother: Lady Shuiqiu

Qian Liu
- Traditional Chinese: 錢鏐
- Simplified Chinese: 钱镠
Transcriptions
Standard Mandarin
- Hanyu Pinyin: Qián Liú
Wu
- Romanization: Zie Leu

Qian Poliu
- Traditional Chinese: 錢婆留
- Simplified Chinese: 钱婆留
Transcriptions
Standard Mandarin
- Hanyu Pinyin: Qián Póliú

Qian Jumei
- Traditional Chinese: 錢具美
- Simplified Chinese: 钱具美
Transcriptions
Standard Mandarin
- Hanyu Pinyin: Qián Jùměi

Qian Liu (10 March 852 – 6 May 932), courtesy name Jumei, childhood name Poliu, also known by his temple name as the King Taizu of Wuyue (吳越太祖), was the founding king of Wuyue during the Five Dynasties and Ten Kingdoms period of China. (Note: Qian Liu's title was Wang (王) in Chinese, which could be translated as either "Prince" or "King" in English. The translation of "Prince" will be used here initially when he was created the Wang of Pengcheng, then of Nankang, then of Yue, then of Wu, by the Tang dynasty; then also when he was created the Wang of Wuyue by Later Liang. The translation of "King" will be used after he was created the Guowang (literally, "State King/Prince") of Wuyue by the Later Liang emperor Zhu Youzhen, a title that carried for the rest of his life as a vassal of Later Liang and its successor Later Tang.) He was originally a warlord of the late Tang dynasty.

== Background ==
Qian Liu was born in Lin'an County in 852, during the reign of Emperor Xuānzong of Tang. His father was named Qian Kuan, and his mother, who was from the same clan as his paternal grandmother, was Qian Kuan's wife Lady Shuiqiu. He had four younger brothers—Qian Qi (錢錡), Qian Biao (錢鏢), Qian Duo (錢鐸), and Qian Hua (錢鏵)—all of whom were described in the Spring and Autumn Annals of the Ten Kingdoms (十國春秋) as "brothers of the same father," implying, but not definitely stating, that they were not born of Lady Shuiqiu. In his childhood neighborhood, there was a huge tree. When he played with the other children in the neighborhood near the tree, he would sit on a large rock and order the other children to march in formations; the other children feared him and followed his orders. After he grew up, he did not have a legitimate job, so he became a salt privateer. He befriended several sons of the county secretary Zhong Qi (鍾起) and often drank and gambled with them. Zhong, however, disliked Qian and initially forbade his sons from associating with Qian until, on one occasion, a traveling fortuneteller informed both Qian and Zhong that Qian would one day be extremely honored. Only after that did Zhong allow his sons to associate with Qian. Zhong's sons often gave Qian money. During this time, Qian was described to be good at archery and using spears, and he had a basic understanding of mystical texts.

== Service under Dong Chang and takeover of Zhenhai Circuit ==
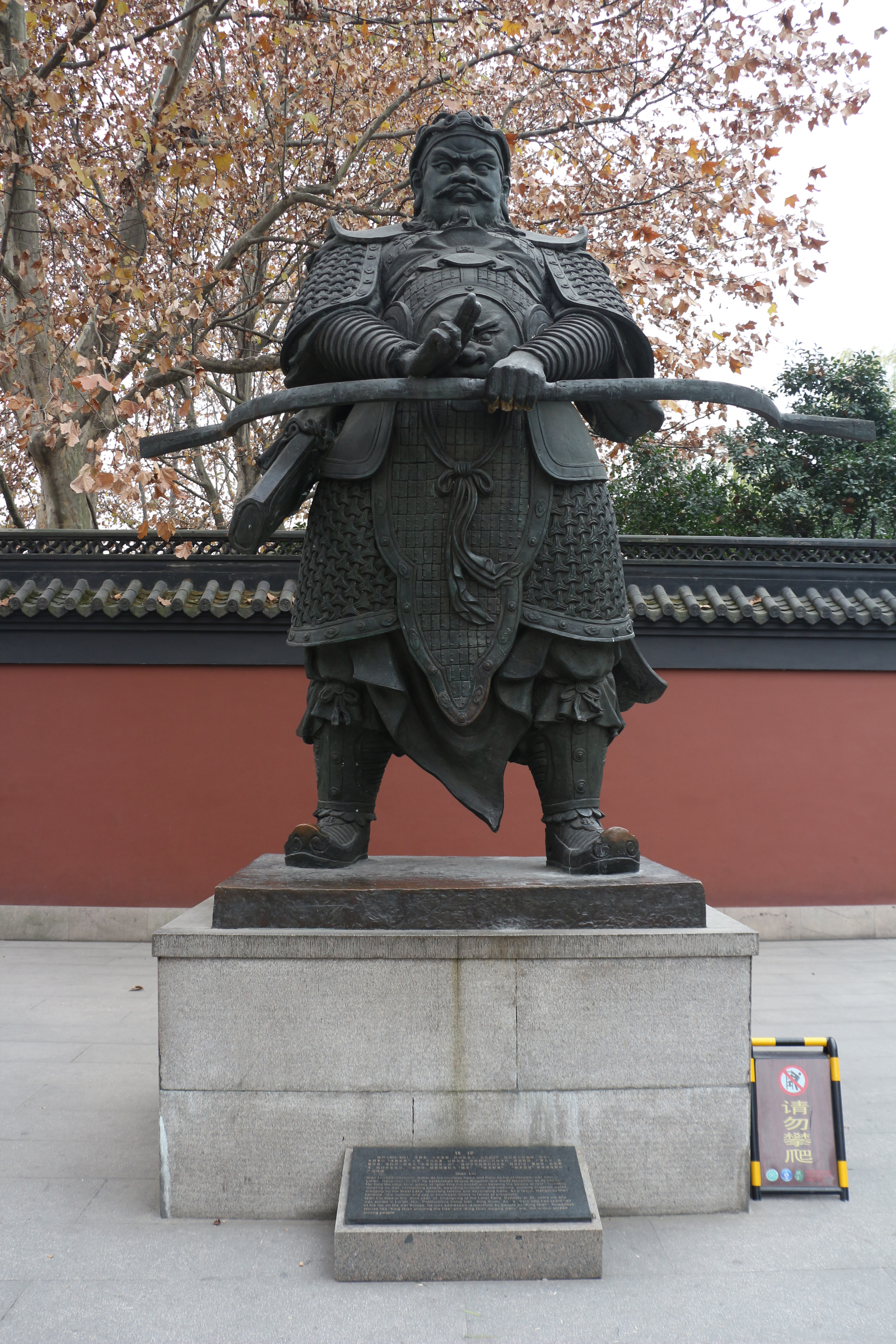
A statue of Qian Liu by the shore of the West Lake in Hangzhou, near the Shrine to the Qian Kings where Qian Liu and his successors are commemorated.

During the rebellion of the army officer Wang Ying in 876–877, Qian and Dong Chang, also from Lin'an, joined a local militia to defend against Wang's raids. After Wang's rebellion was defeated, Dong, for his contributions during the campaign, was made the defender of Shijing Base (石鏡, in modern Hangzhou, Zhejiang), and Qian became a commander under Dong. In 878, when the agrarian rebel Cao Shixiong (曹師雄) was pillaging both Zhenhai Circuit (鎮海, headquartered in modern Zhenjiang, Jiangsu), which Hang Prefecture (which Shijing and Lin'an belonged to) was a part of, and Zhedong Circuit (浙東, headquartered in modern Shaoxing, Zhejiang), the Hang Prefecture government tried to resist the pillages by recruiting 1,000 men from each of the counties in the prefecture. Dong and seven others became the militia commanders, and their troops became known as the "Eight Corps of Hang Prefecture." Subsequently, when soldiers under the major agrarian rebel Huang Chao pillaged Zhenhai, Qian repelled the pillaging Huang army.

In 881, after Huang headed northwest and captured the imperial capital Chang'an, forcing then-reigning Emperor Xizong (Emperor Xuānzong's grandson) to flee to Chengdu, Gao Pian the military governor (Jiedushi) of Huainan Circuit (淮南, headquartered in modern Yangzhou, Jiangsu) gathered troops in the nearby regions and claimed that he was going to launch troops to recapture Chang'an. As part of that, he summoned Dong to Huainan's capital Yang Prefecture (揚州) as well. However, Qian discerned that Gao had no real intentions to attack Huang, and he advised Dong to claim that he needed to return to Hang Prefecture to defend it. Dong did so, and Gao agreed to let him leave. Meanwhile, the imperial government had just recently commissioned a new prefect of Hang Prefecture, Lu Shenzhong (路審中). Before Lu could get to Hang Prefecture, however, Dong took his troops from Shijing into Hang Prefecture to intimidate Lu. Lu, fearful of Dong, did not take office. Dong then claimed the title of acting prefect, and had his officers submit petitions to the military governor of Zhenhai, Zhou Bao, to have Dong be officially commissioned. Zhou, believing that he could not control Dong otherwise, made Dong the prefect of Hang Prefecture.

In 882, Liu Hanhong the governor (觀察使, guanchashi) of Zhedong, who wanted to take over Zhenhai, sent his brother Liu Hanyou (劉漢宥) and officer Xin Yue (辛約) to attack Hang Prefecture. Dong sent Qian to resist the Zhedong army, and Qian defeated them, forcing them to flee. Liu made another attack in 883, and Dong's army, under Qian, again defeated the Zhedong army, killing Xin and Liu Hanhong's brother Liu Hanrong (劉漢容).

In 886, Dong and Qian were discussing what to do with Zhedong—which by this point had been renamed Yisheng Circuit (義勝)—when Dong made the offer to Qian, "If you can capture Yue Prefecture [(越州, Yisheng's capital)], I will yield Hang Prefecture to you." Qian agreed, responding, "You are right. If Yue were not captured, it will eventually be harmful to us." Qian thus launched the Hang Prefecture army and attacked Liu Hanhong, repeatedly defeating his army. By winter 886, Qian had captured Yue Prefecture, and Liu Hanhong was captured by his own subordinate Du Xiong (杜雄) the prefect of Tai Prefecture (台州, in modern Taizhou, Zhejiang). Dong executed Liu, and moved his headquarters to Yue, claiming the title of acting governor, while making Qian the prefect of Hang Prefecture. In 887, Emperor Xizong commissioned Dong as the governor of Zhedong and Qian as the prefect of Hang Prefecture. Later, Dong was made the military governor of Yisheng, which was then renamed to Weisheng (威勝).

In 887, a mutiny at Zhenhai's capital Run Prefecture (潤州), led by Zhou's officer Xue Lang, forced Zhou to flee from Run Prefecture to Chang Prefecture (常州, in modern Changzhou, Jiangsu) to come under the protection of his officer Ding Congshi (丁從實) the prefect of Chang Prefecture, while Xue claimed the title of acting military governor. In response, Qian sent three of the "Eight Corps" commanders, Du Leng (杜稜), Ruan Jie (阮結), and Cheng Ji (成及) to attack Xue. After a victory over Xue's officer Li Junwang (李君暀), however, for reasons unclear, Du attacked and captured Chang Prefecture, and Ding fled to Huainan. Qian had Zhou escorted to Hang Prefecture, where he welcomed Zhou in a grand ceremony fitting the ceremony welcome by a subordinate of a military governor. Zhou would die at Hang Prefecture soon thereafter. (The New Book of Tang indicated that Qian killed Zhou, but Sima Guang, the lead author of the Zizhi Tongjian, found the account not credible and did not adopt it.) Meanwhile, Qian ordered Ruan to attack Run Prefecture, and Ruan captured it. Xue was taken captive, and Qian had his heart cut out of his body to be sacrificed to Zhou. Qian also sent his cousin Qian Qiu (錢銶) to attack Su Prefecture (蘇州, in modern Suzhou, Jiangsu), and Qian Qiu captured it in spring 888, allowing Qian Liu to control most of Zhenhai territory, which he largely held onto from this point on—resisting even an imperial attempt to take control of Su, by a failed assassination attempt against the imperially-commissioned prefect Du Ruxiu (杜孺休), which caused Du Ruxiu to flee and allowed Qian to retain control. (Su Prefecture was briefly captured by Sun Ru, one of the contenders for control of Huainan after Gao was killed in a mutiny, in late 891, but Qian soon recaptured it, and entered into a temporary alliance with Sun's rival Yang Xingmi, supplying Yang's army with food.) Meanwhile, to placate Qian, then-reigning Emperor Zhaozong (Emperor Xizong's brother and successor) created Qian the Baron of Wuxing, and in 892 gave him the title of the defender of a new Wusheng Circuit (武勝) with its headquarters at Hang Prefecture, as well as governor (觀察使, Guanchashi) of the Su-Hang region and created him the Marquess of Pengcheng. In 893, Emperor Zhaozong officially made him the military governor of Zhenhai—now with its headquarters at Hang, as Run and Chang prefectures fell into Yang's control in 892. In 894, Emperor Zhaozong bestowed on Qian the honorary chancellor title of Tong Zhongshu Menxia Pingzhangshi (同中書門下平章事). In spring 895, Emperor Zhaozong created Qian the Duke of Pengcheng.

== Destruction of Dong Chang ==
Throughout the years, despite Qian Liu's expansion in power, Dong Chang still viewed him as a vassal. Meanwhile, Dong had become increasingly megalomanic, such that he had a temple built to himself fashioned similarly to the temple to Yu the Great (the mythical founder of the Xia dynasty) and ordered his people to worship only at his temple, not at Yu's temple. He also petitioned Emperor Zhaozong, seeking to be created the greater title of Prince of Yue (from his then-title of Prince of Longxi). The imperial government did not agree immediately, and Dong became displeased. His followers, wanting to please him, encouraged him to take the next step and become the Emperor of Yue. In spring 895, he declared himself the emperor of a new state of "Luoping of the Great Yue" (大越羅平國), after killing every staff member who dared to speak against it.

Dong sent messengers to Qian to inform Qian that he had become emperor and that he was making Qian the commander of the forces of the "Two Zhes"—i.e., Zhenhai and Yisheng, which were on the opposite banks of the Qiantang River (Zhe River). Qian, disagreeing with Dong's decision to claim imperial title, wrote back: "Rather than closing up your gates to try to be the Son of Heaven, so that your entire clan and the people will all fall into fire, why not open your door to be Jiedushi, so that you will have honor and wealth the rest of your life? It is still not too late to repent." Dong refused Qian's suggestion, so Qian advanced to Yue Prefecture with 30,000 men, bowing down to him outside the Yue city gates, and stating to him that he brought soldiers to force Dong to repent. Dong, in fear, rewarded Qian money and delivered several sorcerers who advocated his taking the throne to Qian, claiming that he would soon submit a confession to Emperor Zhaozong. Only then did Qian withdraw and report the matter to Emperor Zhaozong.

Emperor Zhaozong, however, believed that Dong had great contributions over the years and that he must have just been afflicted with a mental illness. He thus pardoned Dong but ordered him to retire. However, the ambitious Qian, who was hopeful that the imperial government would declare a campaign against Dong so that he could be able to turn on Dong without appearing to be ungrateful, then submitted an accusation against Dong, pointing out that Dong committed the unpardonable crime of treason. Emperor Zhaozong thus issued an edict ordering Qian to attack Dong. Meanwhile, Yang Xingmi, who did not want to see Qian take over Weisheng, sent messengers to Qian to point out that Dong had already repented and should be pardoned, but Qian did not relent. (During the campaign, Qian's father Qian Kuan died; Emperor Zhaozong sent imperial messengers to mourn him, and also created Qian the greater title of Prince of Pengcheng.)

Yang thus tried to relieve Qian's pressure on Dong by sending his officer Tai Meng (臺濛) to attack Su Prefecture. Qian did not let up his attack, however, and Yang further sent Tian Jun the military governor of Ningguo Circuit (寧國, headquartered in modern Xuancheng, Anhui) and An Renyi (安仁義) the military prefect of Run Prefecture to attack Qian as well. The Huainan attack was bogged down for some time, however, allowing Qian to continue his attack of Weisheng, even after, in spring 896, because of Yang's request, Emperor Zhaozong pardoned Dong completely and restored his titles.

Qian's forces repeatedly defeated Dong's, and Dong exacerbated the matter by killing anyone who dared to give him accurate information about Qian's military strength. By summer 896, Qian's officer Gu Quanwu (顧全武) had reached Yue and put it under siege. Only then did Dong become fearful. He abandoned the title of emperor and referred to himself as military governor again, but the siege continued. Qian considered abandoning the siege after Huainan forces captured Su Prefecture about the same time, but Gu pointed out that capturing Yue should be the first priority, and Qian agreed.

Soon thereafter, the outer city of Yue fell, and Dong withdrew into the inner city to continue to defend it. Qian then sent Dong's old subordinate Luo Tuan (駱團) to Dong, stating that there were imperial orders for Dong to retire to Lin'an. Dong thus agreed to surrender. Gu delivered Dong toward Hang Prefecture, but executed him and his family on the way, as well as some 300 subordinates who supported his imperial claim. Qian delivered Dong's head to Chang'an and took over his territory. As Dong's people had been greatly drained by his heavy taxation, Qian opened up the storages, gave money to the soldiers and food to the people, to relieve their financial distress.

== Rule over Zhenhai and Zhendong ==
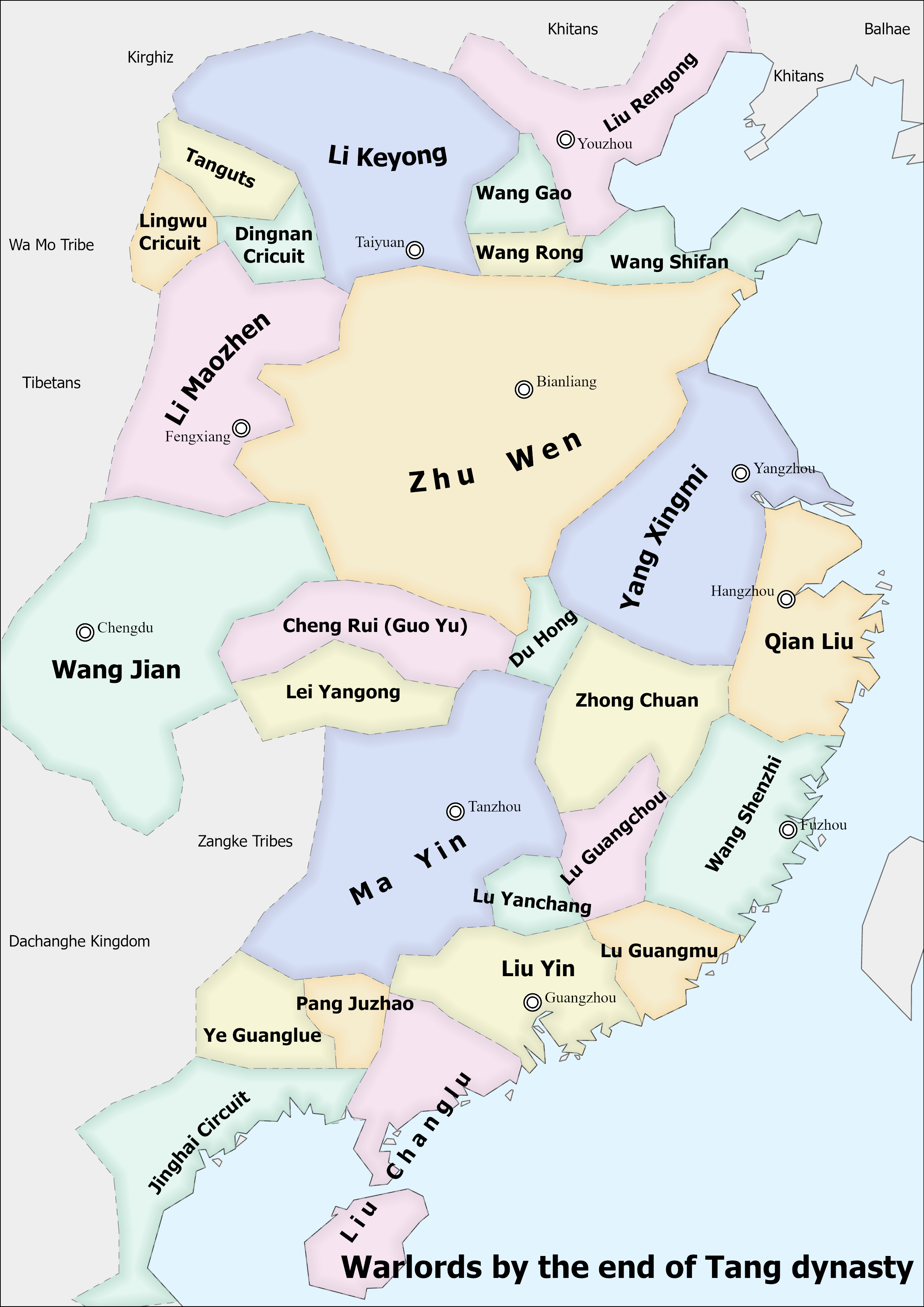
End of Tang Warlords, with the territory controlled by Qian Liu

After Qian Liu killed Dong Chang, Emperor Zhaozong bestowed on Qian the greater honorary chancellor title of Zhongshu Ling (中書令), but for some time did not official confirm his takeover of Weisheng. Instead, he commissioned the chancellor Wang Tuan as the military governor of Weisheng. Qian, however, got the soldiers and the people of both Zhenhai and Weisheng to submit petitions asking that Qian be given Weisheng as well. Emperor Zhaozong was forced to recall Wang and, after renaming Weisheng to Zhendong (鎮東), made Qian the military governor of both Zhenhai and Zhendong.

Despite Dong's destruction, the warfare between Qian and Yang Xingmi did not cease, and over the next several years there were intermittent battles as both sides tried to capture cities that the other side controlled. Qian captured Hu (湖州, in modern Huzhou, Zhejiang from Yang's vassal Li Yanhui (李彥徽) in 897 and recaptured Su from Huainan's officer Qin Pei (秦裴) in 898, while Tian Jun's subordinate Kang Ru (康儒) captured Wu Prefecture (婺州, in modern Jinhua, Zhejiang) from Qian's nominal vassal Wang Tan (王檀) in 899. In 901, Emperor Zhaozong bestowed the honorary chancellor title of Shizhong (侍中) on Qian. Also that year, Qian's mother Lady Shuiqiu died.

In fall 901, a rumor reached Yang that Qian had been assassinated. Yang, believing the rumor, sent his officer Li Shenfu to attack Hang Prefecture, to try to seize it in a power vacuum. Qian sent Gu Quanwu to resist the attack. Gu viewed Li Shenfu lightly, and Li Shenfu and his deputy Lü Shizao (呂師造) were able to ambush, defeat, and capture him. Li Shenfu put Lin'an under siege, but soon realized that the rumor of Qian's death was a false one. He could not capture Lin'an quickly and was apprehensive that Qian might counterattack, and therefore gained goodwill by protecting Qian's family tombs and allowing Gu, whom Qian valued greatly, to write home. He also pretended that a major Huainan reinforcement was on the way. Qian thus sought peace and offered a monetary reward. Li Shenfu, after accepting it, withdrew. In 902, the sides made peace, and Gu was returned to Qian in return for Qin. Later that year, Emperor Zhaozong promoted Qian's princely title from Prince of Pengcheng to Prince of Yue.

In fall 902, Qian faced the most serious challenge to his rule since he took over the two circuits. He was visiting his ancestral neighborhood in Lin'an, which he had promoted to the status of Yijin Base (衣錦軍). Meanwhile, he ordered his officer Xu Wan, and Xu's soldiers to dredge a canal, a task that Xu and his soldiers, who had previously served under Sun Ru and who fled to Qian after Yang defeated Sun, complained about; despite the advice by Cheng Ji, who was Qian's deputy military governor by this point, to rescind the dredging order, Qian did not relent. While Qian was at Yijin, Xu and Xu Zaisi (許再思) started a mutiny and tried to capture Hang Prefecture, which was defended by Qian's son Qian Chuanying (錢傳瑛) and Ma Chuo. They captured the outer city, but Qian Chuanying and Ma held out against the attack in the inner city. Qian Liu, hearing of the mutiny, had to rush back to Hang Prefecture and only got into the inter city through the siege with difficulty. With the inner city continued to be under siege, there were some suggestions that Qian flee to Zhendong's capital Yue Prefecture, but Qian remained at Hang after advice from Du Leng's son Du Jianhui (杜建徽).

Still, Qian was concerned that Xu Wan and Xu Zaisi would instead seize Yue, and he was ready to send Gu to Yue to defend it. Gu, however, pointed out that Xu Wan and Xu Zaisi, after being unable to capture Hang quickly, would surely seek aid from Tian, and that he should try to ensure that Yang would not agree with such an action. At Gu's advice, Qian had his son Qian Chuanliao (錢傳璙) accompany Gu on a mission to Huainan (to offer Qian Chuanliao as a hostage to Yang), seeking for Yang to stop a potential attack from Tian.

After Gu and Qian Chuanliao departed for Huainan's capital Guangling (廣陵), as Gu expected, Xu Wan and Xu Zaisi sought aid from Tian. Tian arrived with an army to aid the siege, while offering Qian safe passage to Yue if he was willing to yield Hang. Qian refused. Tian thus put Hang under siege. Meanwhile, Gu and Qian Chuanliao had arrived at Guangling and persuaded Yang that if Tian seized Hang, his power would increase such that he would no longer be subordinate to Yang and would in fact pose a major danger. Yang, after keeping Qian Chuanliao at Guangling and marrying a daughter to him, thus agreed to recall Tian. When Tian initially failed to withdraw, Yang sent the message, "If you do not return, I will send someone else to take over Xuan Prefecture [(宣州, Ningguo's capital)]." Tian thus agreed to withdraw, after extracting money tributes and Qian Liu's son Qian Chuanguan as a hostage, to whom he gave a daughter in marriage. Xu Wan and Xu Zaisi followed Tian back to Ningguo.

In 903, Tian, resentful of how Yang forced him to abandon the Zhenhai campaign, rebelled against Yang, along with An Renyi. Yang sent Li Shenfu to engage Tian, and Li Shenfu, after initial victories, captured Xu Wan. Yang had Xu Wan delivered to Qian, and Qian cut out Xu Wan's heart and sacrificed it to Gao Wei (高渭), an officer who was killed in the Xu Wan/Xu Zaisi mutiny. With Tian and An each having substantial armies, Yang sought aid from Qian, and Qian sent his officer Fang Yongzhen (方永珍) to help attack An's base Run Prefecture, his cousin Qian Yi (錢鎰) to help attack Xuan Prefecture, and Yang Xi (楊習) to attack Mu Prefecture (睦州, in modern Hangzhou), whose prefect Chen Xun (陳詢) had rebelled against Qian. Around the new year 904, Tian was killed by Tai Meng in battle, and Yang regained control of Ningguo. In the aftermaths, Qian Chuanguan, whom Tian had wanted to kill but who was protected by Tian's mother Lady Yin and Tian's brother-in-law Guo Shicong (郭師從), returned to Hang safely. Yang also returned Qian Chuanliao and his wife (Yang's daughter) to Hang Prefecture. Meanwhile, Qian had sent requests to the imperial government, seeking to be created the Prince of Wuyue—to signify his ambition toward not only the historical Yue region (modern Zhejiang) but also the historical Wu region (modern Jiangsu). The imperial government refused. Zhu Quanzhong the military governor of Xuanwu Circuit (宣武, headquartered in modern Kaifeng, Henan), who had by this point seized control of Emperor Zhaozong and forced him to move the capital to Luoyang, however, was an ally of Qian's, and so at Zhu's request, Qian was created the Prince of Wu (a title that Yang also carried).

Mu Prefecture, however, remained out of Qian's control, and in late 904, after Qian sent Ye Rang (葉讓) to try to assassinate Chen Zhang (陳璋) the prefect of Qu Prefecture (衢州, in modern Quzhou, Zhejiang), whom Qian had resented for receiving Xu Wan's associate Zhang Hong (張洪), Chen Zhang also submitted to Yang. Meanwhile, Yang sent Tao Ya (陶雅) to aid Chen Xun. When Qian Yi, Gu, and Wang Qiu (王球) engaged Tao, Tao defeated them, capturing Qian Yi and Wang. Tao then further advanced to attack Wu Prefecture, and Qian sent his brother Qian Biao and Fang to try to relieve Wu Prefecture. After Yang's death in 905 and succession by his son Yang Wo, however, because Yang Wo had a running dispute with Wang Maozhang the governor of Xuan Prefecture, Wang Maozhang abandoned Xuan and fled to Qian. Apprehensive that Wang Maozhang would cut off his escape path, Tao withdrew, allowing Qian to retake Mu and Qu Prefectures.

In 907, Qian Liu sent Qian Chuanliao and Qian Chuanguan to attack Wen (溫州, in modern Wenzhou, Zhejiang) and Chu (處州, in modern Lishui, Zhejiang) Prefectures, which were part of Zhendong Circuit but had been held independently by the brothers Lu Ji (盧佶) and Lu Yue (盧約) respectively. They defeated and killed Lu Ji quickly, and Lu Yue subsequently surrendered, allowing Qian Liu to take control of Wen and Chu Prefectures.

== As Later Liang vassal ==
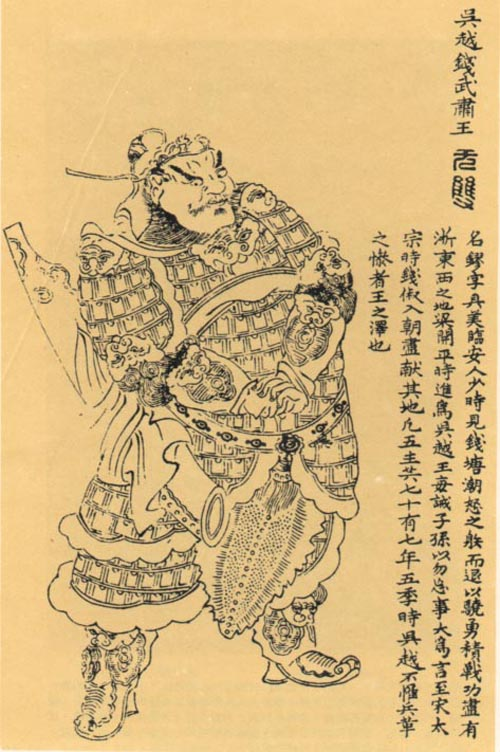
Qian Liu as depicted in the Wu Shuang Pu (無雙譜, Table of Peerless Heroes) by Jin Guliang.

In spring 907, Zhu Quanzhong, who had had Emperor Zhaozong killed in 904 and replaced with Emperor Zhaozong's son Emperor Ai, had Emperor Ai yield the throne to him, ending Tang and establishing Later Liang as its Emperor Taizu. Most local governors in the Tang empire recognized the new Later Liang emperor as their emperor, with the exceptions of Li Keyong the military governor of Hedong Circuit (河東, headquartered in modern Taiyuan, Shanxi), who carried the title of Prince of Jin; Li Maozhen the military governor of Fengxiang Circuit (鳳翔, headquartered in modern Baoji, Shaanxi), who carried the title of Prince of Qi; Yang Wo, who carried the title of Prince of Hongnong (each of whom claimed continued loyalty to the defunct Tang dynasty but are generally viewed as independent states from this point on); and Wang Jian the military governor of Xichuan Circuit (西川, headquartered in modern Chengdu, Sichuan), who carried the title of Prince of Shu (and who soon thereafter declared his own state of Former Shu as its emperor). Qian Liu recognized the new Later Liang emperor as well, despite urgings by his staff member Luo Yin to join the other military governors in opposing Later Liang due to its usurpation of the Tang throne. Subsequently, Emperor Taizu created Qian the Prince of Wuyue and also made him the titular military governor of Huainan as well as Zhenhai and Zhendong, and this is traditionally viewed as the founding of the Wuyue state. However, despite Qian's status as a vassal to Later Liang, instead of using Emperor Taizu's Kaiping era name, he adopted an era name of his own (Tianbao), signifying a claim on his own sovereignty.

Late in 907, Hongnong forces attacked Xin Prefecture (信州, in modern Shangrao, Jiangxi), then-held by the independent warlord Wei Quanfeng's brother Wei Zaichang (危仔倡). Wei Zaichang sought aid from Wuyue, and Wuyue forces attacked Hongnong's Ganlu Base (甘露鎮, near Run Prefecture) in spring 908 to try to relieve the pressure on Xin. Later in the year, he further sent Wang Maozhang (whose name was then changed to Wang Jingren to observe naming taboo for Emperor Taizu's father Zhu Cheng (朱誠)) to Later Liang to submit a plan to attack Hongnong. (Wang would thereafter remain at Later Liang and serve as a Later Liang general.) In response, Hongnong (which by this point was ruled by Yang Wo's brother and successor Yang Longyan after Yang Wo was assassinated in 908) sent Zhou Ben and Lü Shizao to put Su Prefecture under siege; by 909, however, Wuyue forces had defeated Hongnong forces sieging Su, and Hongnong forces retreated. Meanwhile, at Qian's request, the Later Liang general Kou Yanqing (寇彥卿) was also attacking Hongnong, but after Kou was unable to make much headway, Kou withdrew.

Later in 909, Wei Quanfeng gathered the forces in his domain (Fu (撫州, in modern Fuzhou, Jiangxi), Xin, Yuan (袁州, in modern Yichun, Jiangxi), and Ji (吉州, in modern Ji'an, Jiangxi) Prefectures) and attacked Hongnong's Zhennan Circuit (鎮南, headquartered in modern Nanchang, Jiangxi), aided by Ma Yin the Prince of Chu. Hongnong sent Zhou to engage Wei, and Zhou defeated and captured him. Wei Zaichang initially agreed to submit to Hongnong, but when Hongnong sent the officer Zhang Jingsi (張景思) to replace Wei Zaichang, Wei Zaichang, in fear, fled to Wuyue. Qian gave Wei Zaichang the title of deputy military governor of Huainan and changed his surname from Wei to Yuan (元) (as Qian disliked "Wei," which meant "danger").

In winter 909, Qian, having heard that Gao Li (高澧) the prefect of Hu Prefecture was violent and cruel to his people, wanted to executed Gao. Gao, hearing this, rebelled and offered to submit to Wu (i.e., Hongnong, as Yang Longyan by now was using the title of Prince of Wu that his father Yang Xingmi held). Qian sent Qian Biao to attack him, while Wu sent Li Jian (李簡) to try to aid him. Gao's officers Sheng Shiyou (盛師友) and Shen Xingsi (沈行思) turned against him, and Gao fled to Wu, allowing Wuyue to retain Hu, which Qian Liu made Qian Biao the prefect of after personally touring it to try to calm the locale. Also around this time, Qian built a major seawall at the mouth of the Qiantang River and enlarged the Hang Prefecture city perimeter. It was said that after this Hang Prefecture became the richest prefecture in the southeast China.

In 912, Emperor Taizu was assassinated by his son Zhu Yougui the Prince of Ying, who took the throne. Zhu Yougui bestowed on Qian the special title of Shangfu (尚父, "imperial father"), a title that Qian appeared to keep even after Zhu Yougui was in turn killed in a counter-mutiny in 913 and succeeded by his brother Zhu Youzhen the Prince of Jun. Also in 913, Wu made two attempts to attack and capture Yijin, commanded by Li Tao (李濤) in one operation and Hua Qian (花虔) and Wo Xin (渦信) in the other. Qian Liu sent Qian Chuanguan and Qian Chuanliao to resist, and both times defeated Wu forces, capturing Li Tao, Hua, and Wo. He then sent Qian Chuanguan, Qian Chuanliao, and Qian Chuanying to attack Wu's Chang Prefecture. They, however, were defeated by Wu's regent Xu Wen.

In 916, Qian Liu sent the official Pi Guangye to submit tributes to Zhu Youzhen, taking the lengthy route (as was required by geopolitical situations) through the domain of Wang Shenzhi the Prince of Min, the independent warlord Tan Quanbo (譚全播, whose headquarters was at Qian Prefecture (虔州, in modern Ganzhou, Jiangxi), and Chu. Zhu Youzhen was greatly touched by this gesture and conferred on Qian the title of Generalissimo of All Circuits (諸道兵馬元帥, Zhudao Bingma Yuanshuai), and then in 917 modified the title to Generalissimo of All Forces in the Realm (天下兵馬元帥, Tianxia Bingma Yuanshuai), which would from this point on become a title traditionally held by Wuyue kings. Also in 916, Qian Liu's son Qian Chuanxiang (錢傳珦) entered into a marriage with a daughter of Wang Shenzhi, and thereafter Wuyue and Min had friendly relations.

In 918, Wu attacked Tan's domain, and Tan sought aid from Wuyue, Min, and Chu. Qian sent his son Qian Chuanqiu (錢傳球) to put Xin Prefecture under siege to try to relieve the pressure on Tan. However, Zhou Ben, who was then the prefect of Xin, pretended that he had more forces than he actually had, and Qian Chuanqiu withdrew. Subsequently, the Wu general Liu Xin (劉信) defeated and captured Tan and incorporated his domain into Wu territory. (This cut off the route that Qian used for paying tributes to Later Liang, and from this point on he was forced to use the sea route to do so.)

In 919, Qian launched a major attack on Wu, with Qian Chuanguan in command. The operation was initially highly successful, with Qian Chuanguan crushing the Wu fleet under the command of Peng Yanzhang (彭彥章) on the Yangtze River at the Battle of Langshan Jiang (狼山, in modern Nantong, Jiangsu). In light of the victory, Qian Chuanguan attacked Chang Prefecture, but was defeated by Xu Wen at Wuxi (無錫, in modern Wuxi, Jiangsu), killing the Wuyue generals He Feng (何逢) and Wu Jian (吳建) and forcing Qian Chuanguan to flee. Xu Wen's assistant and adoptive son Xu Zhigao wanted to counterattack and seize Su Prefecture, but Xu Wen, interested in using this victory to force Wuyue into a peace arrangement, declined. Instead, he returned the Wuyue captives that he took. Qian Liu, in return, sought peace with Wu, ending the long-term intermittent warfare between Wu and Wuyue. However, even though Yang Longyan and Xu Wen both repeatedly wrote Qian to urge him to declare independence from Later Liang, Qian refused. However, he also took no action when Zhu Youzhen ordered him to attack Liu Yan, who controlled the modern Guangdong and Guangxi region and who had recently declared himself the emperor of a new state of Southern Han. Subsequently, in 920, Wu further returned Qian Yi, who had been captured in 904 and continuously held, to Wuyue, while Wuyue returned Li Tao to Wu. Also in 920, Qian Liu and Ma Yin entered into a marriage arrangement where Qian's son Qian Chuansu (錢傳璛) married a daughter of Ma's, to cement a relationship between Wuyue and Chu.

In 923, Zhu Youzhen sent his official Cui Xie to create Qian Liu the greater title of King of Wuyue, signifying the Later Liang emperor's recognition of Qian as a sovereign of his own state albeit as a Later Liang vassal. Qian thereafter began to take on styles that were similar to, but slightly lower status to, the Later Liang emperor, including referring to his residence as a palace, referring to his place of administration as a court, and referring to his orders as edicts. Thereafter, also, by the emperor's permission, in his submissions to Later Liang he no longer referred to himself as a military governor but as the King of Wuyue. He also established a government structure that was akin to the imperial government, with lesser titles. The Later Liang emperor's edicts also referred to him only as the King of Wuyue and no longer by his name, to show deference to him. Qian thereafter made Qian Chuanguan the acting military governor of Zhenhai and Zhendong.

== As Later Tang vassal ==
Later in 923, Li Keyong's son and successor Li Cunxu the Prince of Jin declared himself the emperor of a new Later Tang (as Emperor Zhuangzong), and soon thereafter made a surprise attack against the Later Liang capital Daliang. Zhu Youzhen, caught by surprise, committed suicide, ending Later Liang. Later Liang territory was taken by Later Tang. Qian Liu did not immediately react to Later Liang's destruction, but in late 924 offered tribute to Emperor Zhuangzong. In response, Emperor Zhuangzong conferred on him all of the titles that Later Liang had previously conferred on him. Qian submitted a large tribute, and gave many gifts to powerful Later Tang politicians. He requested that Emperor Zhuangzong grant him a golden seal, a certificate of his creation written on jade, the privilege of not being referred to by name, and the continued use of the title of king. Despite some Later Tang officials' reservations—pointing out that jade certificates were traditionally reserved for emperors and that, unless non-Chinese vassals were involved, vassals were not supposed to carry kingly titles—Emperor Zhuangzong granted Qian's requests. Subsequently, when Qian sent an emissary, Shen Tao (沈瑫), to Wu to inform Wu what had occurred, Wu authorities (probably referring to Xu Wen) refused Shen entry to Wu territory, on the basis that it believed that Wuyue, by the virtue of its name, was improperly showing ambition against Wu. The two states' relations interrupted for some time thereafter.

In 926, there was a time when Qian was, due to illness, resting at Yijin, leaving Qian Chuanguan in charge of the state affairs at the capital Qiantang (i.e., Hang Prefecture). Xu sent emissaries, ostensibly to wish Qian Liu a speedy recovery. Qian, judging correctly that Xu was trying to figure out how ill he was and preparing a potential attack, met with the emissaries despite his illness. Xu, believing that Qian was not that ill, cancelled the planned attack. Qian soon recovered and returned to Qiantang.

In 928, Qian wanted to officially make Qian Chuanguan his heir, but as Qian Chuanguan was not his oldest son, he decided to gather his sons and state, "State your contributions. I will make the one who has the most contributions my heir." In response, Qian Chuanguan's older brothers Qian Chuanyi (錢傳懿), Qian Chuanliao, and Qian Chuanjing (錢傳璟) all endorsed Qian Chuanguan. Qian thereafter submitted a petition to Emperor Zhuangzong's adoptive brother and successor Emperor Mingzong that the military governorships of Zhenhai and Zhendong be transferred to Qian Chuanguan. Emperor Mingzong approved the request.

By 929, Qian had offended Emperor Mingzong's army chief of staff (Shumishi) An Chonghui by being arrogant in his style in his letters to An. Further, after Emperor Mingzong's emissaries to Wuyue, Wu Zhaoyu (烏昭遇) and Han Mei (韓玫) returned to Later Tang on a mission, Han accused Wu Zhaoyu of bowing to Qian and revealing state secrets to Qian. An thus persuaded Emperor Mingzong to order Wu Zhaoyu to commit suicide. Thereafter, Emperor Mingzong ordered Qian to retire with the title of Taishi (太師) and stripped him of all other titles, and further ordered that the Later Tang circuits arrest all Wuyue emissaries. Qian had his sons submit petitions to plead for him, but An ignored them. In 930, Qian, as Pei Yu (裴羽), the emissary that Emperor Mingzong had sent to create Wang Shenzhi's son and successor Wang Yanjun the Prince of Min was returning to Later Tang, wrote an apologetic petition and gave it to Pei to submit to Emperor Mingzong; in response, Emperor Mingzong released the Wuyue emissaries, but did not restore Qian's titles. In 931, after Emperor Mingzong removed An from his position as army chief of staff, he restored all of Qian's titles and blamed the situation on An.

In 932, Qian grew seriously ill. Despite his prior designation of Qian Chuanguan as heir, he, in order to test the subordinates' loyalty, stated, "I will surely not recover from this illness. My sons are foolish and weak. Who can succeed me as generalissimo?" The subordinates all responded, "The chancellor for the two circuits [(i.e., Qian Chuanguan, who had been given an honorary chancellor title)] is both kind and filially pious, and also had accomplishments. Who would dare not to support him?" Qian Liu thus gave all of the keys to the storages to Qian Chuanguan, stating, "The generals and the administrators all support you. You should govern benevolently." He also stated, "My descendants should serve Zhongguo [(i.e., the governing central state of China)] faithfully, regardless of what the surname of the ruling dynasty is." He died thereafter. Qian Chuanguan (who then changed his name to Qian Yuanguan) succeeded him (as King Wenmu). Emperor Mingzong gave Qian Liu the posthumous name of Wusu (武肅, "martial and solmen").

== Personality and impact of reign ==
Under Qian Liu's reign, Wuyue prospered economically and freely developed its own regional culture that continues to this day. He developed the coastal kingdom's agriculture, built seawalls, expanded Hangzhou, dredged rivers and lakes, and encouraged sea transport and trade. He built an embankment against the famous "bore" in the Qiantang River near Hangzhou, which was his capital; and on one occasion, when the works were threatened, he is said to have driven back the waters by the discharge of a flight of arrows. Qian Liu is said to have used on his campaigns a cylindrical pillow, to prevent him from sleeping too heavily. Despite these contributions, however, the Song dynasty historian Ouyang Xiu (the lead author of the New History of the Five Dynasties) blamed him for luxurious living and for imposing heavy taxation and punishments on his people. Qian Liu is depicted in the Wu Shuang Pu (無雙譜, Table of Peerless Heroes) by Jin Guliang.

== Family ==
=== Consorts and issue ===
- Lady Ma, of the Ma clan (馬氏), sister of Ma Chuo
- Lady Dowager Zhaoyi of Jin, of the Chen clan (晉國昭懿太夫人 陳氏)
  - Qian Yunlian (錢元璉, 877 – 884), né Chunlian (錢傳璉), first son
  - Qian Yuanguan (錢元瓘, 30 November 887 – 17 September 941), né Qian Chuanguan (錢傳瓘), King Wenmu of Wuyue (吳越文穆王), seventh son
  - Qian Yuanjin (錢元瑾, 889 – 903), né Chuanjin (錢傳瑾), eleventh son
  - Qian Yuanyou (錢元祐, b. 893), né Qian Chuanyou (錢傳祐), seventeenth son
  - Qian Yuanbi (錢元弼, b. 894), eighteenth son
  - Qian Yuanyuan (錢元邧, 898 – 922), né Qian Cuanyuan (錢傳邧), nineteenth son
- Lady Zhuangmu of Wuyue, of the Wu clan (吳越莊穆夫人 吳氏)
  - Qian Chuanying (錢傳瑛, 878 – 913), né Qian Chuankai (錢傳鍇), Duke of Yun (雲國公), third son
  - Qian Yuanliao (錢元璙, 887–942), né Qian Chuanliao (錢傳璙), honored Prince Xuanyi of Guangling (廣陵宣義王) posthumously, sixth son
  - Qian Chuanji (錢傳㻑, 889 – 910), the Marquess of Jinhua (金華侯), tenth son
  - Qian Chuansu (錢傳璛, 890 – 925), Marquess of Xin'an (新安侯), fourteenth son
  - Qian Yuanjing (錢元璟, 891 – 921), Duke of Zhao (霅國公), fifteenth son
  - Qian Yuanlin (錢元琳, b.899), Marquess of Wuxing (吳興侯), twenty-third son
- Lady Qing'an, of the Hu clan (慶安夫人胡氏)
  - Qian Yuanji (錢元璣, 877 – 910), né Qian Chuanji (錢傳璣), the Duke of Ning (宁国公), second son
  - Qian Yuansui (錢元璲, 880 – 933), né Qian Chuansui (錢傳璲), Marquess of Yongjia (永嘉侯), fourth son
  - Qian Yuanxiang (錢元珦, b. 890), né Qian Chuanxiang (錢傳珦), Marquess of Huaiyin (淮陰侯), twelfth son
  - Qian Yuanzuo (錢元琢, b. 898), twentieth son
  - Qian Yuanxu (錢元禧, b. 929), thirtieth son
- Lady Jin, of the Jin clan (金氏)
  - Qian Yuanyi (錢元懿) (886–951), né Qian Chuanchou (錢傳儔), Prince Xuanhui of Jinhua (金華郡王), fifth son
  - Qian Yuanqiu (錢元球, 888 – 937), né Qian Chuanqiu (錢傳球), Marquess of Funan (扶南侯), ninth son
  - Qian Yuanyun (錢元玧, b.890), né Qian Chuanyan (錢傳琰), thirteenth son
  - Qian Yuandang (錢元璫, 899 – 970), né Qian Chuandang (錢傳璫), twenth-second son
  - Qian Yuanxun (錢元珣, b. 911), twenty-fourth son
- Lady Zhang, of the Zhang clan (章氏)
  - Qian Yuanpu (錢元璞, b. 898), né Qian Chuanpu (錢傳璞), Marquess of Qiantang (錢塘侯), twenty-first son
- Lady Ji'nan, of the Tong clan (童氏)
  - Qian Chuanqu (錢傳(王瞿)) (888–907), Marquess of Yuyao (餘姚縣侯), eight son
  - Qian Yuanchen (錢元琛, b. 922), twenty-sixth son
  - Qian Yuangui (錢元璝, d. 965), Prince of Ningming (追封寧明王), twenty-eight son
- Lady Xiao, of the Chen clan (小陈氏)
  - Qian Yuanyu (錢元裕, b. 891), sixteenth son
  - Qian Yuanyuan (錢元(王𣶒), b. 912), twenty-fifth son
  - Qian Yuanfan (錢元璠, b.925), twenty-seventh son
  - Qian Yuanxu (錢元勗, b. 927), twenty-ninth son
- Lady Zheng, of the Zheng clan (鄭氏)
- Unknown
  - Qian Yuangui (錢元珪), thirty-first son
  - Unnamed seventh son
  - Lady Qian (錢氏), first daughter
    - married Cheng Rengxiu (成仁琇), a son of Cheng Ji (成及)

=== Descendants ===
Millions of people today in Jiangsu, Shanghai, and Zhejiang bear the surname Qian, many of whom are direct descendants of Qian Liu. Many of his 38+ sons were posted to different parts of his kingdom, greatly increasing the density of the Qian surname within the former territory of Wuyue. Notable descendants include:

- Qian Xuesen, (1911–2009) was a prominent Chinese aerodynamicist, cyberneticist and politician who contributed to rocket science and established engineering cybernetics
- Qian Yuanguan, (887–941) the second king of the state of Wuyue, during the Five Dynasties and Ten Kingdoms period of China
- Hsue-Chu Tsien, (1914–1997) aeronautic and mechanical engineer who played important roles in aircraft building in both China and afterward the United States
- Roger Y. Tsien, (1952–2016) Chinese-American biochemist. He was a professor of chemistry and biochemistry at the University of California, San Diego and was awarded the 2008 Nobel Prize in Chemistry for his discovery and development of the green fluorescent protein
- Richard W. Tsien, (1945–) Chinese-born American neurobiologist and engineer. He is the Druckenmiller Professor of Neuroscience, Chair of the Department of Physiology and Neuroscience, and Director of the NYU Neuroscience Institute at New York University Medical Center
- Robert Tjian, Asian-American biochemist best known for his work on eukaryotic transcription, currently Professor of Biochemistry and Molecular Biology at the University of California, Berkeley
- Ch'ien Mu, (1895–1990) was a Chinese historian, educator, philosopher and Confucian
- Chien Shih-Liang, (1908–1983) was a Taiwanese chemist, educator
- Qian Liren, (1924–) a Chinese politician, diplomat, and translator who had a distinguished career in foreign affairs
- Robert Chien (February 8, 1929 – March 2, 2014) was a Taiwanese economist
- Shu Chien (1931–) is a Taiwanese physiologist and bioengineer

== In fiction ==
The 1620 short story collection Illustrious Words to Instruct the World by Feng Menglong contained a story on Qian Liu titled "Qian Poliu Begins His Career in Lin'an" (臨安里錢婆留發跡).

A 28-episode Chinese television series King Qian in Wuyue was produced in 2006 starring Wang Yanan as Qian Liu.

== Notes ==
Regnal titles
Preceded by None (kingdom founded)	Prince/King of Wuyue; 907–932	Succeeded by Qian Yuanguan (King Wenmu)
Preceded by Emperor Ai of Tang	Sovereign of China (Zhejiang) (de facto); 907–932	Succeeded by Qian Yuanguan (King Wenmu)
Preceded by Emperor Ai of Tang	Sovereign of China (Zhejiang) (de jure); 907–932	Succeeded by Li Siyuan of Later Tang
