= Ming Prefecture (Zhejiang) =

Historical administrative division in Zhejiang, China

- Simplified Chinese: 明州
- Hanyu Pinyin: Míng Zhōu

Yuyao Commandery; (742–758)
- Traditional Chinese: 餘姚郡
- Hanyu Pinyin: Yúyáo Jùn
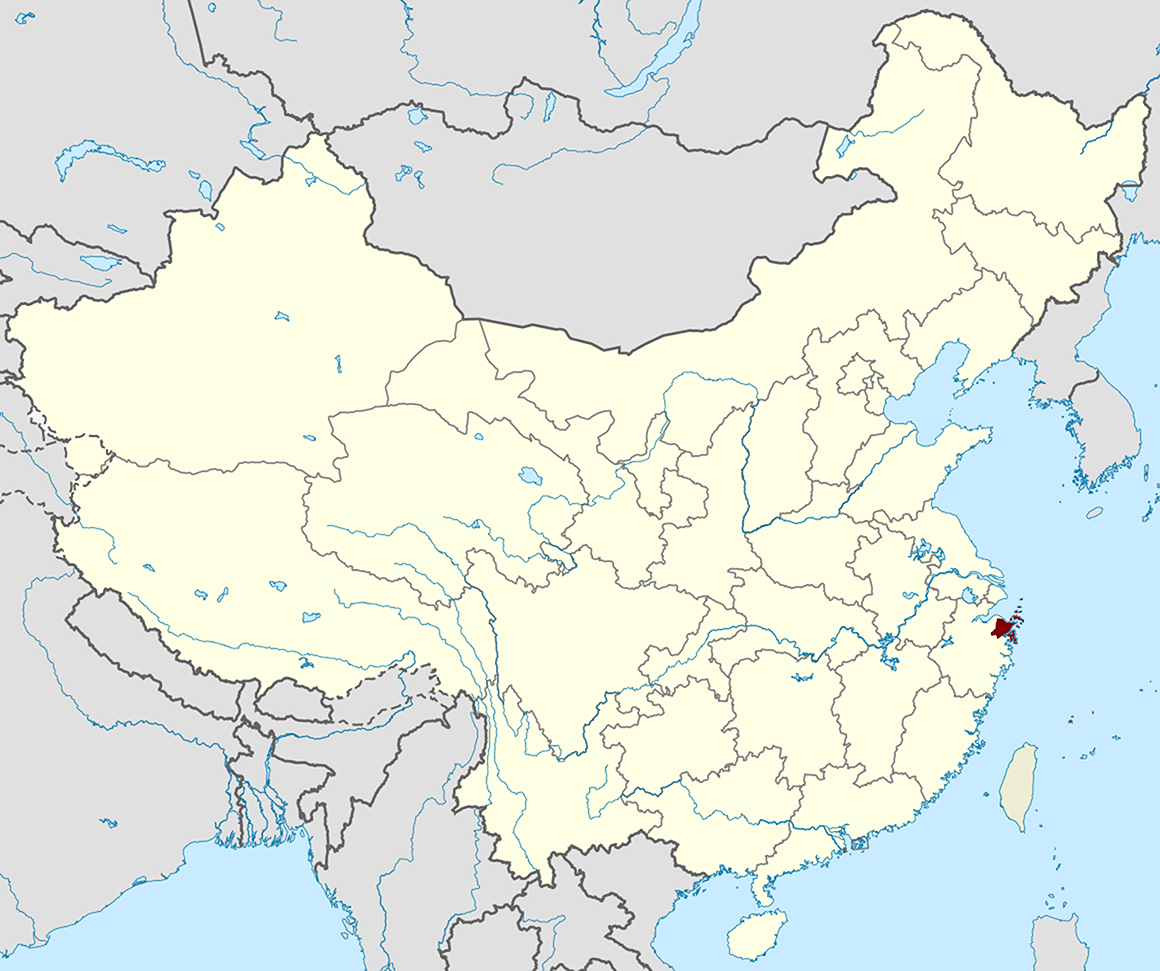
- Population
  - 739: 207,032
  - 1100s: 220,017
- History
  - Preceded by: Yin Prefecture (鄞州)
  - Created: 738 (Tang dynasty)
  - Abolished: 1194 (Song dynasty)
  - Succeeded by: Qingyuan Prefecture
  - HQ: Mao (鄮, before 908); Yin (鄞, after 908)
- Contained within
  - Circuit (Tang dynasty): Jiangnan East Circuit (before 758); Zhejiang East Circuit (758–907)
  - Kingdom: Wuyue (907–978)
  - Circuit (Song dynasty): Liangzhe Circuit (before 1060s); Liangzhe East Circuit (after 1060s)

Mingzhou or Ming Prefecture (738–1194) was a zhou (prefecture) in imperial China located in modern northeastern Zhejiang, China, around modern Ningbo. The prefecture was called Yuyao Commandery from 742 to 758.

Located on the coast of the East China Sea and the southern bank of Hangzhou Bay (which connects it to Hang Prefecture and the Grand Canal), Ming Prefecture was one of the most important international ports during the Tang (618–907), Wuyue (907–978) and Song (960–1279) dynasties. Cargo ships to and from Japan, Silla (57 BC – 935 AD), Goryeo (918–1392), and Liao (907–1125) frequented this prefecture. Ming Prefecture also administered Zhoushan, an island archipelago off the Zhejiang coast, including Zhoushan Island.

== Counties ==
For most of its history, Ming Prefecture administered the following 4–6 counties (縣):

#	Tang dynasty	Wuyue	Song dynasty	Modern location
1	Wengshan (翁山)	Yin (鄞)	Changguo (昌國)	Zhoushan
2	Mao (鄮)	Yin (鄞)	Yin	Ningbo (City Proper)
3	Mao (鄮)	Wanghai (望海)	Dinghai (定海)	Zhenhai District, Ningbo
4	Fenghua (奉化)			Fenghua District, Ningbo
5	Cixi (慈溪)			Cixi, Zhejiang
6	Xiangshan (象山)			Xiangshan County, Zhejiang

Before 764, Xiangshan (which is separated from the prefectural seat by Xiangshan Harbor) was under the administration of Tai Prefecture.

== History ==
=== Tang dynasty ===
Ming Prefecture was created on 3 August 738 by splitting Mao County (鄮縣) from Yue Prefecture and dividing the area into 4 counties. Around 500 homeless people from Run Prefecture were brought over to resettle in Ming Prefecture.

In 739, it was determined that 207,032 people from 42,027 families resided in Ming Prefecture.

In 744, Mao County's magistrate Lu Nanjin (陸南金) had laborers expand the Wanjin Lake (now known as Dongqian Lake) to facilitate irrigation and agricultural water management.

In 744, while waiting for the typhoon to pass before embarking on his third journey to Japan, the Buddhist monk Jianzhen stayed at the Temple of King Ashoka.

In 752, three ships carrying Japanese diplomats from Empress Kōken's court arrived in Ming Prefecture.

In 762, Yuan Chao (袁晁) rebelled from the Zhoushan Archipelago, and quickly took several prefectures including Ming Prefecture. In 763, Yuan Chao was destroyed and captured by the Tang army led by Li Guangbi.

In 798, military officer Li Huang (栗鍠) rebelled in Ming Prefecture. He was defeated in 799.

In 804, a Japanese ship carrying 127 people from Emperor Kanmu's court arrived in Ming Prefecture, the Buddhist monk Saichō among them.

== Prefects ==
=== Tang dynasty ===
- Qin Changshun (秦昌舜), 738
- Lü Yanzhi (呂延之), 758–759
- Pei Jing (裴儆), 771–773
- Cui Yin (崔殷), 773–?
- Wang Mi (王密), 770s
- Zhao Heng (趙恒)
- Li Chang (李長), 770s
- Wang Mu (王沐), 788–?
- Ren Dong (任侗), 793–?
- Han Cha (韓察), 821–823
- Ying Biao (應彪), 823–?
- Li Wenru (李文孺), 829–?
- Yu Jiyou (于季友), 832–?
- Zhang Cizong (張次宗), 840s
- Li Jingfang (李敬方), 847–?
- Yin Sengbian (殷僧辯)
- Li Xiugu (李休古), 850s?
- Li Kang (李伉), 865
- Cui Qi (崔琪), 874–?
- Zhong Jiwen (鍾季文), 881–892
- Liu Wen (劉文), 880s?
- Yang Zhuan (羊僎), 880s?
- Huang Sheng (黄晟), 892–909

=== Wuyue ===
- Qian Hua (錢鏵)
- Shen Chengye (沈承業), 916–?
- Qian Yuanqiu (錢元球), 916–?
- Qian Yuanqu (錢元[𤣩瞿]), 924–926?
- Qian Yuanxiang (錢元珦), ?–933
- Yang Renquan, 933–?
- Kan Fan (闞燔), 945–?
- Qian Hongyi (錢弘億), 949–?
- Qian Weizhi (錢惟治), 975–978

=== Song dynasty ===
- Wang Su (王素), 980–981
- Xu Xiufu (徐休復), 981–982
- Zhao Yizhi (趙易知), 982–983
- Xi Ping (席平), 983–984
- Qian Xiangxian (錢象先), 984?–987?
- Chen Jin (陳矜), 988–989
- Sun Fu (孫扶), 989–990
- Qiu Chongyuan (邱崇元), 990–992
- Ling Jingyang (凌景陽), 990s
- Chen Chong (陳充), 992–994
- Hu Dan (胡旦), 994–995
- Bao Dang (鮑當), 996–997
- Xu Jizong (徐繼宗), 997–1000
- Ding Gunian (丁顧年), 1000?
- Wang Ying (王膺), 1008–1009
- Su Qi (蘇耆), 1009–1011
- Fan Feng (范諷), 1011–1013
- Kang Xiaoji (康孝基), 1013–1015
- Liu Chuo (劉綽), 1015–1017
- Li Yigeng (李夷庚), 1017–1022
- Yan Su (燕肅), 1022–1023
- Lin Daishu (林殆庶), 1023–1024
- Zeng Hui (曾會), 1024–1027
- Liu Geng (劉賡), 1020s?/1030s?
- Zhang Jiao (張交), 1032–1034
- Xu Qi (徐起), 1035–1036
- Li Zhao (李照), 1036–1037
- Zhang Yan (張弇), 1037–1038
- Li Zhi (李制), 1038–1040
- Bao Yazhi (鮑亞之), 1040–1041
- Qian Yannian (錢延年), 1042–1044
- Lu Zhen (陸軫), 1044–1046
- Wang Zhou (王周), 1040s
- Fan Sidao (范思道), 1047–1049
- Sun Gai (孫沔), 1051–1052
- An Zhen (安稹)
- Lü Changling (呂昌齡), 1053–1054
- Shen Tong (沈同), 1055–1056
- Qi Kuo (齊廓), 1056–1057
- Bao Ke (鮑軻), 1057–1058
- Qian Gongfu (錢公輔), 1058–1060
- Lang Qi (郎玘)
- Li Sidao (李思道), 1064–1065
- Yu Changnian (俞昌年), 1065–1066
- Shen Fu (沈扶), 1066–1067
- Miao Zhen (苗振), 1060s?/1070s?
- Wang Han (王罕), 1069–1071
- Zhao Cheng (趙誠), 1072?–1073?
- Li Yan (李綖), 1073–1074
- Li Ding (李定), 1075–1078
- Zeng Gong, 1078–1079
- Wang Hui (王誨), 1082–1084
- Ma Chong (馬珫), 1084–1085
- Li Kang (李閌), 1080s?/1090s?
- Li Cui (李萃), 1086–1087
- Zhang Xiu (張修), 1080s?/1090s?
- Han Zongdao (韓宗道), 1088–1089
- Wang Fen (王汾), 1089
- Wang Ziyuan (王子淵), 1089–1090
- Liu Shu (劉淑), 1090–1091
- Lü Wenqing (呂溫卿), 1091–1093
- Liu Cheng (劉珵), 1093–1095
- Yao Mian (姚勔), 1090s
- Wang Zishao (王子韶), 1096–1097
- Ye Tao (葉濤), 1097–1098
- Wei Xiang (韋驤), 1098
- Lu Chuan (陸傳)
- Wang Zishen (王資深), 1102
- Ye Di (葉棣)
- Peng Xiu (彭休)
- Bai Tong (白同)
- Qian Jingfeng (錢景逢)
- Song Kangnian (宋康年), 1109
- Tan Zongdan (檀宗旦), 1110–1111
- Cai Zhao (蔡肇), 1111
- Li Tunan (李圖南), 1110s
- Lü Zong (呂宗), 1110s
- Zhou Zhi (周秩), 1114–1115
- Zhou Bangyan, 1115
- Mao You (毛友), 1116–1117
- Lou Yi (樓异), 1117–1121?
- Li Youwen (李友聞), 1121–1122
- Jiang Yi (蔣彝), 1122
- Jiang You (蔣猷), 1122–1123
- Zhao Yi (趙億), 1123–1125
- Wei Xian (魏憲), 1125–1126
- Li Biru (李弼孺), 1126
- Li Youwen (2nd appointment), 1126–1127
- Su Xi (蘇攜), 1127–1128
- Jin Shou (金受), 1128–1129
- Shen Hui (沈晦), 1129–1130
- Zhang Ruzhou (張汝舟), 1130
- Liu Hongdao (劉洪道), 1130
- Xiang Zimin (向子忞), 1130
- Wu Mao (吳懋), 1130–1132
- Chen Jian (陳戩), 1132
- Lu Changmin (陸長民), 1132–1133
- Li Chengzao (李承造), 1133
- Guo Zhongxun (郭仲荀), 1133–1135
- Qiu Yu (仇悆), 1135–1138
- Zhou Gang (周綱), 1138–1139
- Pan Lianggui (潘良貴), 1139–1140
- Qiu Yu (2nd appointment), 1140–1141
- Liang Rujia (梁汝嘉), 1141–1142
- Mo Jiang (莫將), 1142–1145
- Qin Di (秦棣), 1145–1147
- Xu Chen (徐琛), 1147–1150
- Cao Yong (曹泳), 1150–1152
- Han Jin (韓璡), 1152–1153
- Li Zhuang (李莊), 1153–1154
- Wang Hui (王會), 1154–1155
- Li Chong (李㳘), 1155
- Fang Zi (方滋), 1155
- Wang Yu (王俁), 1155–1156
- Jiang Shizhong (姜師仲), 1156–1158
- Zhao Shanji (趙善繼), 1158–1159
- Zhang Cheng (張偁), 1159–1160
- Shen Gai (沈該), 1160–1162
- Han Zhongtong (韓仲通), 1162–1163
- Zhao Zisu (趙子潚), 1163–1164
- Zhao Bogui (趙伯圭), 1164–1167
- Zhang Jin (張津), 1167–1169
- Zhao Bogui (2nd appointment), 1169–1174
- Zhao Kai (趙愷), 1174–1180
- Fan Chengda, 1180–1181
- Zhao Yi (趙益), 1181
- Xie Shiji (謝師稷), 1181–1182
- Yang Xie (楊獬), 1182–1184
- Zhao Shikui (趙師夔), 1184–1186
- Geng Bing (耿秉), 1186
- Yan Xi (延璽), 1186
- Yue Fu (岳甫), 1186–1189
- Lin Li (林栗), 1189–1190
- Cheng Dachang (程大昌), 1190–1191
- Lin Ji (林枅), 1191
- Yu Chou (虞儔), 1191
- Gao Kui (高夔), 1191–1193
- Zhu Quan (朱佺), 1193–1194
- He Dan (何澹), 1194–1195
