= Poyang County =

Poyang 鄱阳县
- County
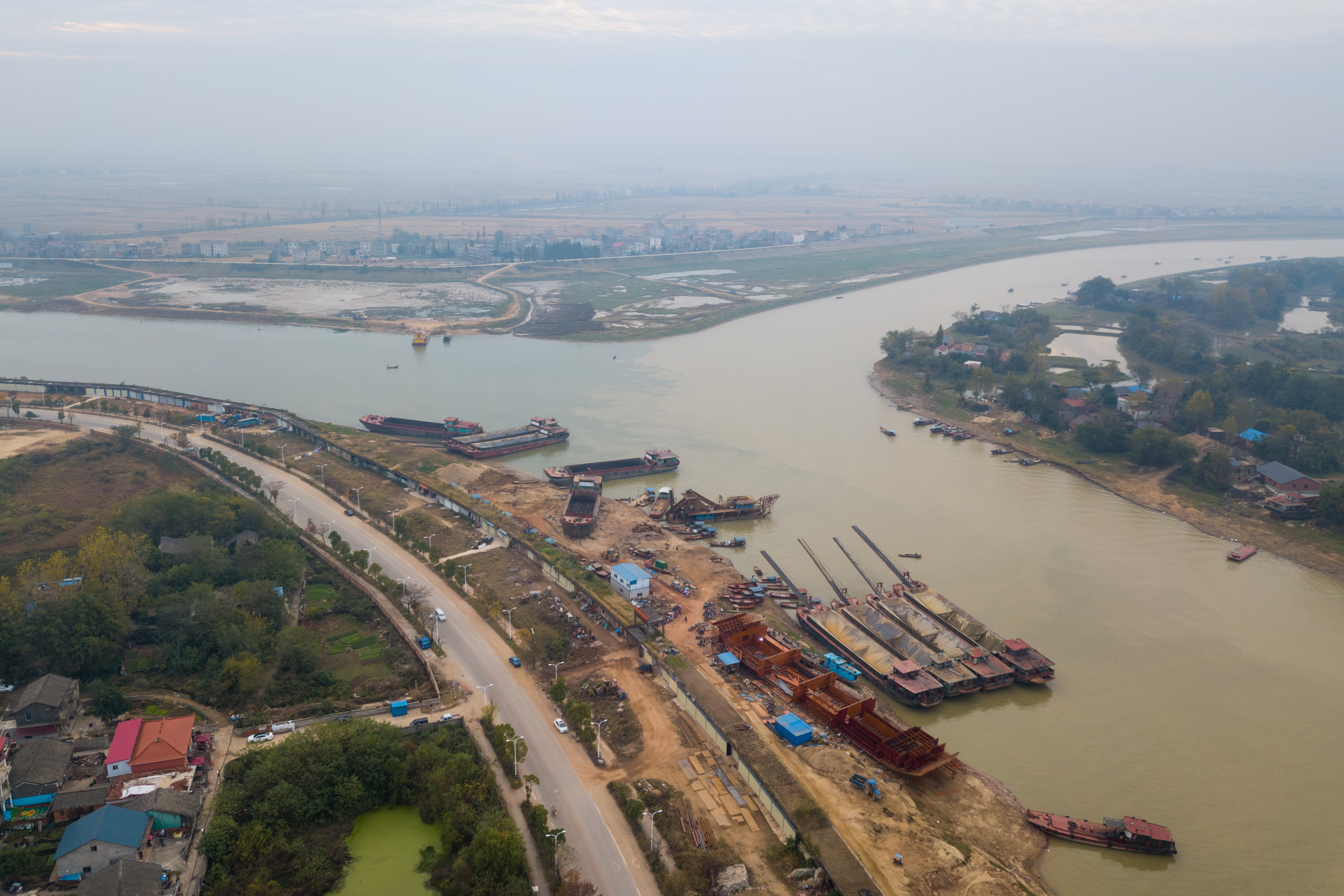

- Coordinates: 29°00′21″N 116°42′13″E
- Country: People's Republic of China
- Province: Jiangxi
- Prefecture-level city: Shangrao

Area
  - Total: 4,215 km^{2} (1,627 sq mi)

Population (2018)
  - Total: 1,600,000
  - Density: 380/km^{2} (980/sq mi)
- Time zone: UTC+8 (China Standard)
- Postal code: 333100

Poyang County
- Traditional Chinese: 鄱陽
- Simplified Chinese: 鄱阳
- Literal meaning: Sunny Po; Northern Po
Transcriptions
Standard Mandarin
- Hanyu Pinyin: Póyáng
- Wade–Giles: P‘o-yang

Former names

Poyang
- Traditional Chinese: 番陽
- Simplified Chinese: 番阳
- Literal meaning: Sunny Po; Northern Po
Transcriptions
Standard Mandarin
- Hanyu Pinyin: Póyáng
- Wade–Giles: P‘o-yang

Po
- Chinese: 番
- Literal meaning: phonetic
Transcriptions
Standard Mandarin
- Hanyu Pinyin: Pó
- Wade–Giles: P‘o

Boyang
- Traditional Chinese: 波陽
- Simplified Chinese: 波阳
- Literal meaning: Sunny Waves; Northern Waves
Transcriptions
Standard Mandarin
- Hanyu Pinyin: Bóyáng
- Wade–Giles: Po-yang

Poyang County is a county under the administration of Shangrao city in the northeast of Jiangxi Province of the People's Republic of China, bordering Anhui Province to the north. It is located on the eastern side of Lake Poyang.

== History ==
The area was known as Po under the Chu state during the Warring States period. Under the Qin, the area was organized as Poyang County (番陽縣) and placed under the administration of Jiujiang. Po was entrusted to the Yue leader Wu Rui. During the collapse of Qin, he allied first with Xiang Yu and then with Liu Bei, becoming successively the king of Hengshan and then Changsha. Under the Han, the area was known as Poyang and placed under the administration of Yuzhang. It kept the same name but changed its first character to the present one under the Western Han.

During Eastern Han, the Yangtze River flowed farther north and Poyang constituted a wide and fertile lowland. Around AD 400, the Yangtze changed its course to the south and flooded the district which has ever since comprised Poyang Lake. Many of its people fled as refugees into neighboring districts.

In 1957, the name of the county was changed to Boyang County, but in December 2003 the original name was restored. On May 27, 2014, Poyang County was designated as directly-controlled county by the provincial government as a part of a pilot program in Jiangxi Province.

== Administrative divisions ==
Poyang County administers 14 towns and 20 rural townships. The county seat is the town of Poyang. Around 1998 the county had approximately 1 million people.

- The town of Poyang had around 1998.
- The Yinhaobu Township had about 20,000 people around 1998. It includes the Guantian Village Committee.
  - The Guantian Village Committee consists of the villages of Cao, Gao, and Xu.
    - In 1997 Gao Village had 351 residents, including people who left the village as migrant workers. Gao Village has a local school that was established in 1969, during the Cultural Revolution. Mobo C. F. Gao, author of the book Gao Village said that around 1995 almost all of the village's children have had two years of education because of the existence of the village school. Gao also said that the school would not have been established if it had not been for the Cultural Revolution. During the Cultural Revolution almost all of the children, including the girls, had an elementary school education spanning three years due to the convenience of having a local school and low costs. Before 1949 no intra-village marriages occurred in Gao Village. Before the Cultural Revolution there was one intra-village marriage, which was a zhaozhui marriage (a zhaozhui 招贅/-赘 marriage is a situation in which the groom lives with the bride's family), it was considered to have a stigma during the pre-Cultural Revolution time and still had some stigma in 1995 since local people believed that only extremely poor, helpless, hopeless, and parentless people entered zhaozhui marriages. Since the Cultural Revolution eight intra-village marriages occurred in Gao Village.

At present, Poyang County has 14 towns and 15 townships.

14 towns

- Poyang (鄱阳镇)
- Xiejiatian (谢家滩镇)
- Shimenjie (石门街镇)
- Sishilijie (四十里街镇)
- Youdunjie (油墩街镇)
- Tianfanjie (田畈街镇)
- Jinpanling (金盘岭镇)
- Gaojialing (高家岭镇)
- Huanggang (凰岗镇)
- Shuanggang (双港镇)
- Guxiandu (古县渡镇)
- Raofeng (饶丰镇)
- Lefeng (乐丰镇)
- Raobu (饶埠镇)

15 townships

- Houjiagang (侯家岗乡)
- Lianhuashan (莲花山乡)
- Xiangshuitan (响水滩乡)
- Jiantianjie (枧田街乡)
- Zhegang (柘港乡)
- Yaquehu (鸦鹊湖乡)
- Yinbaohu (银宝湖乡)
- Youcheng (游城乡)
- Zhuhu (珠湖乡)
- Baishazhou (白沙洲乡)
- Tuanlin (团林乡)
- Changzhou (昌洲乡)
- Miaoqian (庙前乡)
- Lianhu (莲湖乡)
- Lutian (芦田乡)

== Geography ==
Poyang County is located in east longitude 116° to 117°23' 45" 06' 15 ', north latitude 28°46' 26, and 29°42' 03", between the north border with penzer county and east to the county in Anhui province; The border with Yugan, Wannian; east in Jingdezhen, Leping neighbours; with Duchang county are linked by mountains and rivers and northwest. By 2014, Poyang County jurisdiction covers an area of 4215 square kilometers, the water area of 948.7 square kilometers, accounting for 22.5%, therefore has the "China lake city" reputation. The northern portion of the county is mountainous, while Lake Poyang can be found in the west. The center of the county is home to the Lake Poyang Plains.

== Climate ==
Climate data for Poyang, elevation 40 m (130 ft), (1991–2020 normals, extremes 1981–2010)
Month	Jan	Feb	Mar	Apr	May	Jun	Jul	Aug	Sep	Oct	Nov	Dec	Year
Record high °C (°F)	24.8 (76.6)	27.9 (82.2)	32.5 (90.5)	34.5 (94.1)	35.8 (96.4)	36.6 (97.9)	39.4 (102.9)	38.8 (101.8)	37.6 (99.7)	34.9 (94.8)	31.1 (88.0)	23.5 (74.3)	39.4 (102.9)
Mean daily maximum °C (°F)	9.3 (48.7)	12.3 (54.1)	16.3 (61.3)	22.5 (72.5)	27.2 (81.0)	29.7 (85.5)	33.4 (92.1)	33.2 (91.8)	29.8 (85.6)	24.7 (76.5)	18.4 (65.1)	12.0 (53.6)	22.4 (72.3)
Daily mean °C (°F)	5.8 (42.4)	8.4 (47.1)	12.3 (54.1)	18.3 (64.9)	23.1 (73.6)	26.1 (79.0)	29.6 (85.3)	29.2 (84.6)	25.5 (77.9)	20.1 (68.2)	14.0 (57.2)	7.9 (46.2)	18.4 (65.0)
Mean daily minimum °C (°F)	3.2 (37.8)	5.6 (42.1)	9.4 (48.9)	15.0 (59.0)	19.9 (67.8)	23.3 (73.9)	26.6 (79.9)	26.1 (79.0)	22.2 (72.0)	16.6 (61.9)	10.6 (51.1)	5.0 (41.0)	15.3 (59.5)
Record low °C (°F)	−5.2 (22.6)	−5.5 (22.1)	−1.3 (29.7)	4.8 (40.6)	9.9 (49.8)	14.5 (58.1)	19.4 (66.9)	19.9 (67.8)	13.5 (56.3)	4.2 (39.6)	−1.2 (29.8)	−13.3 (8.1)	−13.3 (8.1)
Average precipitation mm (inches)	90.2 (3.55)	102.4 (4.03)	187.3 (7.37)	226.8 (8.93)	221.4 (8.72)	305.8 (12.04)	170.9 (6.73)	126.0 (4.96)	48.9 (1.93)	54.6 (2.15)	79.7 (3.14)	58.2 (2.29)	1,672.2 (65.84)
Average precipitation days (≥ 0.1 mm)	13.8	13.2	17.1	16.0	14.8	15.8	9.9	9.5	6.5	7.1	9.3	9.8	142.8
Average snowy days	2.9	1.4	0.4	0	0	0	0	0	0	0	0.1	0.8	5.6
Average relative humidity (%)	77	77	78	77	77	81	75	75	74	70	73	73	76
Mean monthly sunshine hours	87.7	88.6	100.4	128.1	153.4	136.7	229.1	224.9	190.9	170.0	135.1	122.6	1,767.5
Percentage possible sunshine	27	28	27	33	36	33	54	56	52	48	42	38	40
Source: China Meteorological Administration

== Transportation ==
The Jiujing Highway passes through the northern portion of the county. In total, there are 209 provincial roads in the county. The county is served by Poyang railway station on the Jiujiang–Quzhou railway.

== Famous people ==
- Hong Mai
- Jiang Kui
