= Dong Chang (warlord) =

Chinese Tang dynasty-rebel (died 896)

- Reign: March 3, 895 – 896
- Born: Unknown
- Died: July 3, 896
Full name
- Family name: Dǒng (董); Given name: Chāng (昌)
Era name and dates
- Shùntiān (順天): March 3, 895 – 896
- Dynasty: Luoping of the Great Yue (大越羅平, Dàyùe Lúopíng)

Dong Chang (董昌, died July 3, 896 (Note: 乾寧三年 ... 五月 ... 己亥 [On the jihai day of month 5 of Qianning 3 = July 3, 896] ... 載昌如杭州 ... 斬之 ... [(Dong) Chang was conveyed toward Hangzhou and beheaded.])) was a warlord of the late Tang dynasty in China. He began his career as the leader of a local militia at Hang Prefecture (杭州, in modern Hangzhou, Zhejiang) and gradually increased in power to control most of modern Zhejiang. Not satisfied with the titles that the Tang emperors bestowed on him, he claimed an imperial title in 895 as the emperor of a new state known as Luoping of the Great Yue (大越羅平). His vassal Qian Liu turned against him and killed him, seizing his territory, and eventually becoming the founder of the new state of Wuyue.

== Background ==
It is not known when Dong Chang was born, but it was known that he was from Lin'an (臨安, in modern Hangzhou, Zhejiang), which was part of Hang Prefecture (杭州). During the rebellion of the army officer Wang Ying in 876–877, Dong joined a local militia to defend against Wang's raids. After Wang's rebellion was defeated, Dong, for his contributions during the campaign, was made the defender of Shijing Base (石鏡, in modern Hangzhou).

In 878, when the agrarian rebel Cao Shixiong (曹師雄) was pillaging both Zhenhai Circuit (鎮海, headquartered in modern Zhenjiang, Jiangsu), which Hang Prefecture belonged to, and Zhedong Circuit (浙東, headquartered in modern Shaoxing, Zhejiang), the Hang Prefecture government tried to resist the pillages by recruiting 1,000 men from each of the counties in the prefecture. Dong and seven others became the militia commanders, and their troops became known as the "Eight Corps of Hang Prefecture". Among the men serving under Dong at the time was Qian Liu, who would become a key officer under him.

== Seizure of Hang Prefecture ==
In 881, after the major agrarian rebel Huang Chao captured the imperial capital Chang'an, forcing then-reigning Emperor Xizong to flee to Chengdu, Gao Pian the military governor (Jiedushi) of Huainan Circuit (淮南, headquartered in modern Yangzhou, Jiangsu) gathered troops in the nearby regions and claimed that he was going to launch troops to recapture Chang'an. As part of that, he summoned Dong to Huainan's capital Yang Prefecture (揚州) as well. However, Qian discerned that Gao had no real intentions to attack Huang, and he advised Dong to claim that he needed to return to Hang Prefecture to defend it. Dong did so, and Gao agreed to let him leave. Meanwhile, the imperial government had just recently commissioned a new prefect of Hang Prefecture, Lu Shenzhong (路審中). Before Lu could get to Hang Prefecture, however, Dong took his troops from Shijing into Hang Prefecture to intimidate Lu. Lu, fearful of Dong, did not take office. Dong then claimed the title of acting prefect, and had his officers submit petitions to the military governor of Zhenhai, Zhou Bao, to have Dong be officially commissioned. Zhou, believing that he could not control Dong otherwise, made Dong the prefect of Hang Prefecture.

In 882, Liu Hanhong the governor (觀察使, Guanchashi) of Zhedong, who wanted to take over Zhenhai, sent his brother Liu Hanyou (劉漢宥) and officer Xin Yue (辛約) to attack Hang Prefecture. Dong sent Qian to resist the Zhedong army, and Qian defeated them, forcing them to flee. Liu made another attack in 883, and Dong's army, under Qian, again defeated the Zhedong army, killing Xin and Liu Hanhong's brother Liu Hanrong (劉漢容).

== Seizure of Yisheng Circuit ==
In 886, Dong Chang and Qian Liu were discussing what to do with Zhedong — which by this point had been renamed Yisheng Circuit (義勝) — when Dong made the offer to Qian, "If you can capture Yue Prefecture [(越州, Yisheng's capital), in modern Shaoxing, Zhejiang], I will yield Hang Prefecture to you." Qian agreed, responding, "You are right. If Yue were not captured, it will eventually be harmful to us." Qian thus launched the Hang Prefecture army and attacked Liu Hanhong, repeatedly defeating his army. By winter 886, Qian had captured Yue Prefecture, and Liu Hanhong was captured by his own subordinate Du Xiong (杜雄) the prefect of Tai Prefecture (台州, in modern Taizhou, Zhejiang). Dong executed Liu, and moved his headquarters to Yue, claiming the title of acting governor, while making Qian the prefect of Hang Prefecture. In 887, Emperor Xizong commissioned Dong as the governor of Zhedong and Qian as the prefect of Hang Prefecture. Later, Dong was made the military governor of Yisheng, which was then renamed to Weisheng (威勝).

It was said that at the beginning of Dong's rule, he was frugal and fair, and the people were comforted. He ended the heavy salt taxes. Further, Dong was considered faithful to the imperial government because, while the warlords in the other circuits were all largely withholding proper revenue payments to the imperial government by that point, he was delivering tributes at a frequent interval — once every 10 days, and the imperial government greatly depended on his tributes in continuing to function. Therefore, Dong eventually was given the titles of acting Taiwei (太尉, one of the Three Excellencies), honorary chancellor (同中書門下平章事, Tong Zhongshu Menxia Pingzhangshi), and the Prince of Longxi. However, Dong eventually grew cruel and harsh in his rule, caning and whipping people at will, or even slaughtering families for relatively minor offenses. At one point, he threatened to kill some 5,000 households unless they would yield all of their assets to him, and they agreed to do so. It was said that when judging civil lawsuits, he would simply have the litigants gamble; the winning side would win the case, while the losing side would be killed. He also built a temple dedicated to himself modeled after the temple of Yu the Great (the mythical founder of the Xia dynasty) — prohibiting people from worshipping at Yu's temple, only at his own.

In 893, after the death of Chen Yan the governor of neighboring Fujian Circuit (福建, headquartered in modern Fuzhou, Fujian), whose family had a marital relationship with Dong's family, Chen's brother-in-law Fan Hui (范暉) and Chen's subordinate Wang Chao the prefect of Quan Prefecture (泉州, in modern Quanzhou, Fujian) vied for control of Fujian, and Wang put Fujian's capital Fu Prefecture (福州) under siege. Fan sought aid from Dong, and Dong sent troops. However, before the Weisheng troops could arrive, Wang captured Fu Prefecture, and Fan was killed in flight; Dong then withdrew his troops.

As of 894, Dong petitioned then-reigning Emperor Zhaozong (Emperor Xizong's younger brother and successor), seeking to be created the greater title of Prince of Yue. The imperial government did not agree immediately, and Dong became displeased. His followers, wanting to please him, encouraged him to take the next step and become the Emperor of Yue. In spring 895, he declared himself the emperor of a new state of Luoping of the Great Yue, after killing every staff member who dared to speak against it.

== Defeat and death ==
Dong Chang sent messengers to Qian Liu to inform Qian that he had become emperor and that he was making Qian the commander of the forces of the "Two Zhes" — i.e., Zhenhai and Weisheng, which were on the opposite banks of the Qiantang River (Zhe River). Qian, disagreeing with Dong's decision to claim imperial title, wrote back: "Rather than closing up your gates to try to be the Son of Heaven, so that your entire clan and the people will all fall into fire, why not open your door to be Jiedushi, so that you will have honor and wealth the rest of your life? It is still not too late to repent." Dong refused Qian's suggestion, so Qian advanced to Yue Prefecture with 30,000 men, bowing down to him outside the Yue city gates, and stating to him that he brought soldiers to force Dong to repent. Dong, in fear, rewarded Qian with money and delivered several sorcerers who had advocated his taking the throne to Qian, claiming that he would soon submit a confession to Emperor Zhaozong. Only then did Qian withdraw and report the matter to Emperor Zhaozong.

Emperor Zhaozong, however, believed that Dong had made great contributions over the years and that he must have just been afflicted with a mental illness. He thus pardoned Dong but ordered him to retire. However, the ambitious Qian, who was hopeful that the imperial government would declare a campaign against Dong so that he could turn on Dong without appearing to be ungrateful, then submitted an accusation against Dong, pointing out that Dong had committed the unpardonable crime of treason. Emperor Zhaozong thus issued an edict ordering Qian to attack Dong. Meanwhile, Yang Xingmi, who had taken over Huainan Circuit by this point and who did not want to see Qian take over Weisheng, sent messengers to Qian to point out that Dong had already repented and should be pardoned, but Qian did not relent.

Yang thus tried to relieve Qian's pressure on Dong by sending his officer Tai Meng (臺濛) to attack Su Prefecture (蘇州, in modern Suzhou, Jiangsu), which was then Qian's territory. Qian did not let up his attack, however, and Yang further sent Tian Jun the military governor of Ningguo Circuit (寧國, headquartered in modern Xuancheng, Anhui) and An Renyi (安仁義) the military prefect of Run Prefecture (潤州, in modern Zhenjiang) to attack Qian as well. The Huainan attack was bogged down for some time, however, allowing Qian to continue his attack of Weisheng, even after, in spring 896, because of Yang's request, Emperor Zhaozong pardoned Dong completely and restored his titles.

Qian's forces repeatedly defeated Dong's, and Dong exacerbated the matter by killing anyone who dared to give him accurate information about Qian's military strength. By summer 896, Qian's officer Gu Quanwu (顧全武) had reached Yue and put it under siege. Only then did Dong become fearful. He abandoned the title of emperor and referred to himself as military governor again, but the siege continued. Qian considered abandoning the siege after Huainan forces captured Su Prefecture about the same time, but Gu pointed out that capturing Yue should be the first priority, and Qian agreed.

Soon thereafter, the outer city of Yue fell, and Dong withdrew into the inner city to continue to defend it. Qian then sent Dong's old subordinate Luo Tuan (駱團) to Dong, stating that there were imperial orders for Dong to retire to Lin'an. Dong thus agreed to surrender. Gu delivered Dong toward Hang Prefecture, but executed him and his family on the way, as well as some 300 subordinates who had supported his imperial claim. Qian delivered Dong's head to Chang'an and took over his territory.

== Family ==
Son

- Dong Chenghe (董承和)

== Notes ==
Regnal titles
Preceded by Emperor Zhaozong of Tang	Emperor of China (Zhejiang); 895–896	Succeeded by Emperor Zhaozong of Tang
