= Fujian Circuit =

Administrative division in 9th-century China

- Simplified Chinese: 福建路
- Hanyu Pinyin: Fújiàn Lù
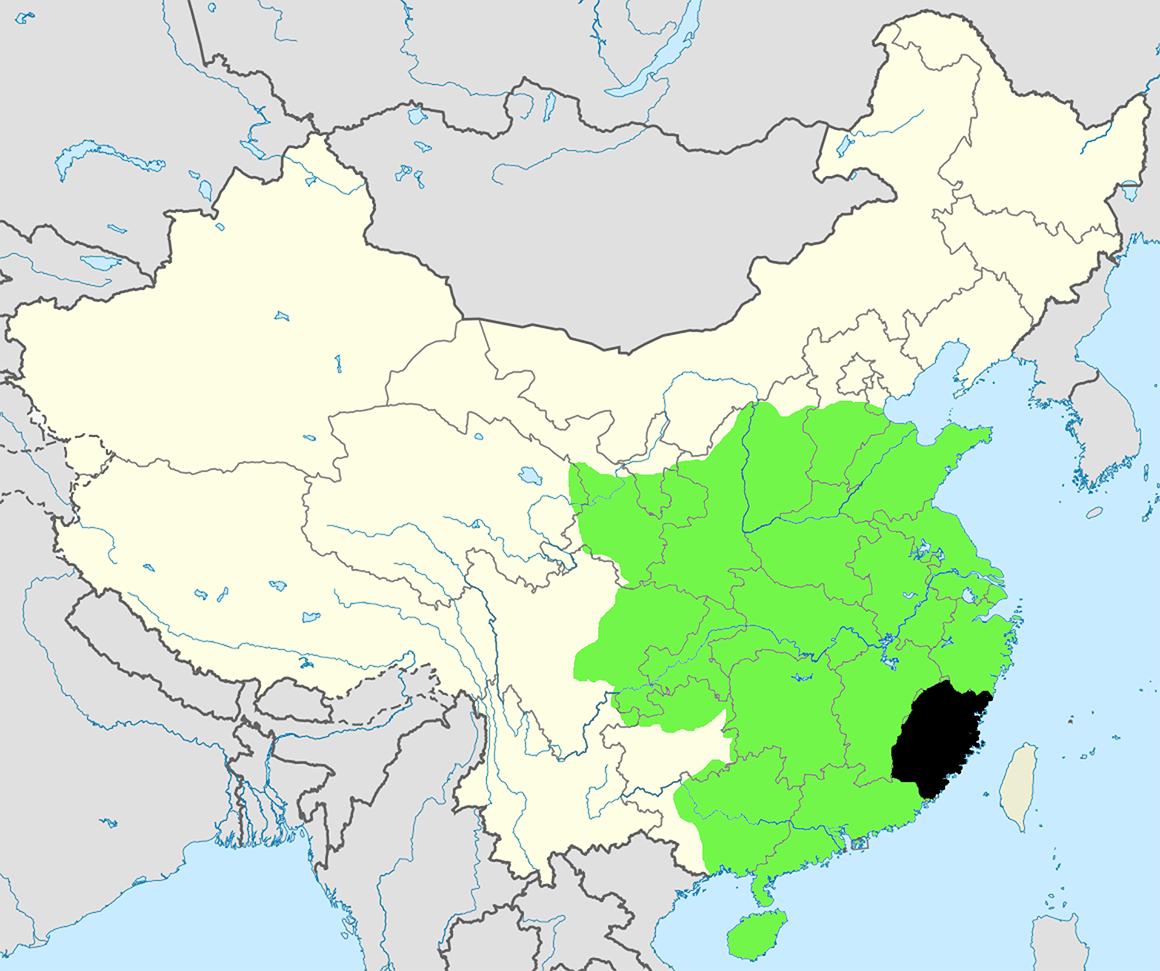
- Fujian Circuit within Song dynasty territory, c. 1100
- Population
  - 1162: 2,828,852
- History
  - Created: 985 (Song dynasty)
  - Abolished: 1278 (Yuan dynasty)
  - HQ: Fu Prefecture

Fujian Circuit, also translated as Fujian Province, was one of the major circuits during the Song dynasty of imperial China. Its administrative area corresponds to roughly the modern Chinese province of Fujian.

== History ==
The Tang-era Fujian Circuit was renamed Wuwei in 896.

== List of governors ==
=== Tang ===
- ...
- Chen Yan (884–891)
- Wang Chao (893–896)

=== Song ===
- ...

== See also ==
- Qingyuan Jiedushi, an administrative circuit in the area created under Southern Tang that briefly remained nominally independent as well under Song

== Bibliography ==
- Shi Weile, ed. (2005). Zhongguo Lishi Diming Da Cidian (中国历史地名大词典) [Large Dictionary of Chinese Historical Place Names] (in Chinese). China Social Sciences Press. ISBN 7-5004-4929-1.
- (in Chinese) Toqto'a; et al., eds. (1345). Song Shi [History of Song].
