= Jiang Kui =

Jiāng Kuí (Chinese: 姜夔) (c. 1155 Poyang – c. 1221 Hangzhou), courtesy name Yaozhang (堯章), art name Baishi Daoren (白石道人), also known as "Jiang Baishi" (姜白石), was a famous Chinese poet, composer, poetry theorist and calligrapher of the Song dynasty, particularly famed for his ci (song lyric poetry). He composed numerous poems, including the famous "He Bei Lai" and the more well known "San Wan Yue."

== Life ==
Jiang was born in Poyang (in today's Jiangxi province). His family was of mediocre social status and Kui himself did not obtain any post in the government throughout his life. His father was a county magistrate during the reign of Emperor Gaozong of Song.

Jiang made multiple attempts on the imperial exam but was not able to pass them. He traveled extensively between the regions of Hubei, Zhejiang, Anhui, Jiangsu and Fujian. He had close contacts with his contemporary poets and literati. Jiang Kui moved to Huzhou from Poyang before finally settling down in Hangzhou where he died.

== Poetry ==
Jiang's poetic style is notably influenced by Zhou Bangyan but his own style was distinct from other poets. In his early years as an abecedarian of poetry, his mentor was Xiao Ju (蕭𣂏). According to his own biography, Jiang values the originality of his poems more than the following of established poetic theories from the past. In the eyes of 13th century artist and art theorist Chen Yu, the poetry of Jiang Kui is marked by his candidness(as a lack of overly ink-horn words) and originality. Chen noted that Jiang's poetry was not influenced by his contemporaries. As a result, Jiang was able to establish his own school at the time and influence other poets that admired his works.

Another 13th-century Ci poet Zhang Yan (張炎) described Jiang's poetic style as "Clouds that leave or stay without a trace", underlining the unpredictability of Jiang's poems.

== Musicology ==
Aside from being a poet, Jiang was also a musicologist of classical Chinese music. He was best known for his lyric poems. Jiang tried to restore the lost tunes of ancient times but was scoffed by the officials of Taichang Si (Office of Great constancy, a government department of ancient China in charge of ritualistic affairs as well as classical music).
