= Jingdezhen North railway station =

Railway station in Zhushan District, Jingdezhen, Jiangxi

Jingdezhen North 景德镇北
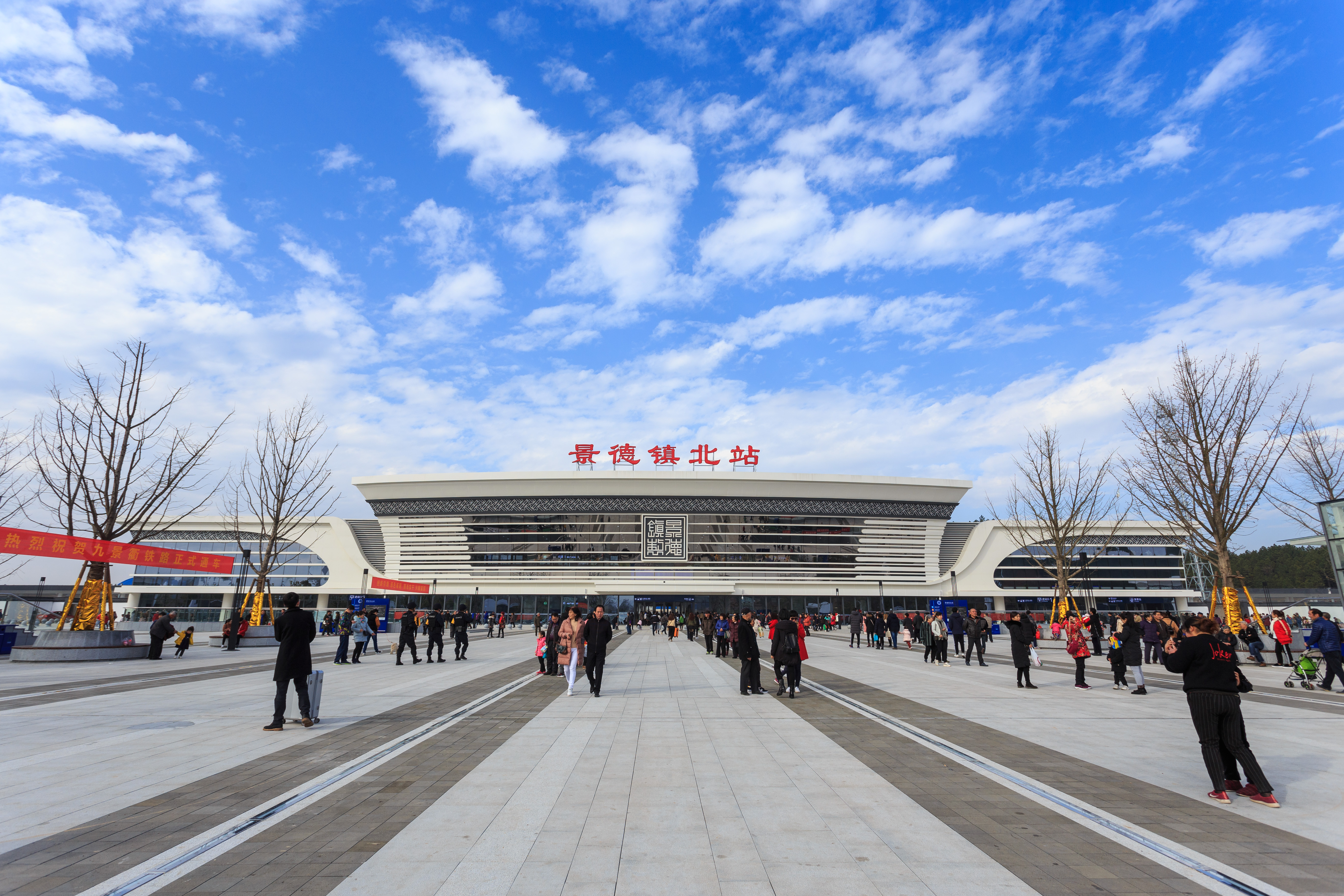

General information
- Location: Zhushan District, Jingdezhen, Jiangxi; China
- Coordinates: 29°20′30″N 117°14′15″E
- Lines: Jiujiang–Quzhou railway; Nanchang–Jingdezhen–Huangshan high-speed railway (under construction)

History
- Opened: 28 December 2017
Location

Jingdezhen North railway station (Chinese: 景德镇北站) is a railway station in Zhushan District, Jingdezhen, Jiangxi, China. It is an intermediate stop on the Jiujiang–Quzhou railway. It opened on 28 December 2017.

Preceding station	China Railway High-speed	Following station
Poyang towards Jiujiang	Jiujiang–Quzhou railway	Wuyuan towards Quzhou
