= Poyang railway station =

Railway station on the Jiujiang–Quzhou railway in Jiangxi, China

Poyang 鄱阳
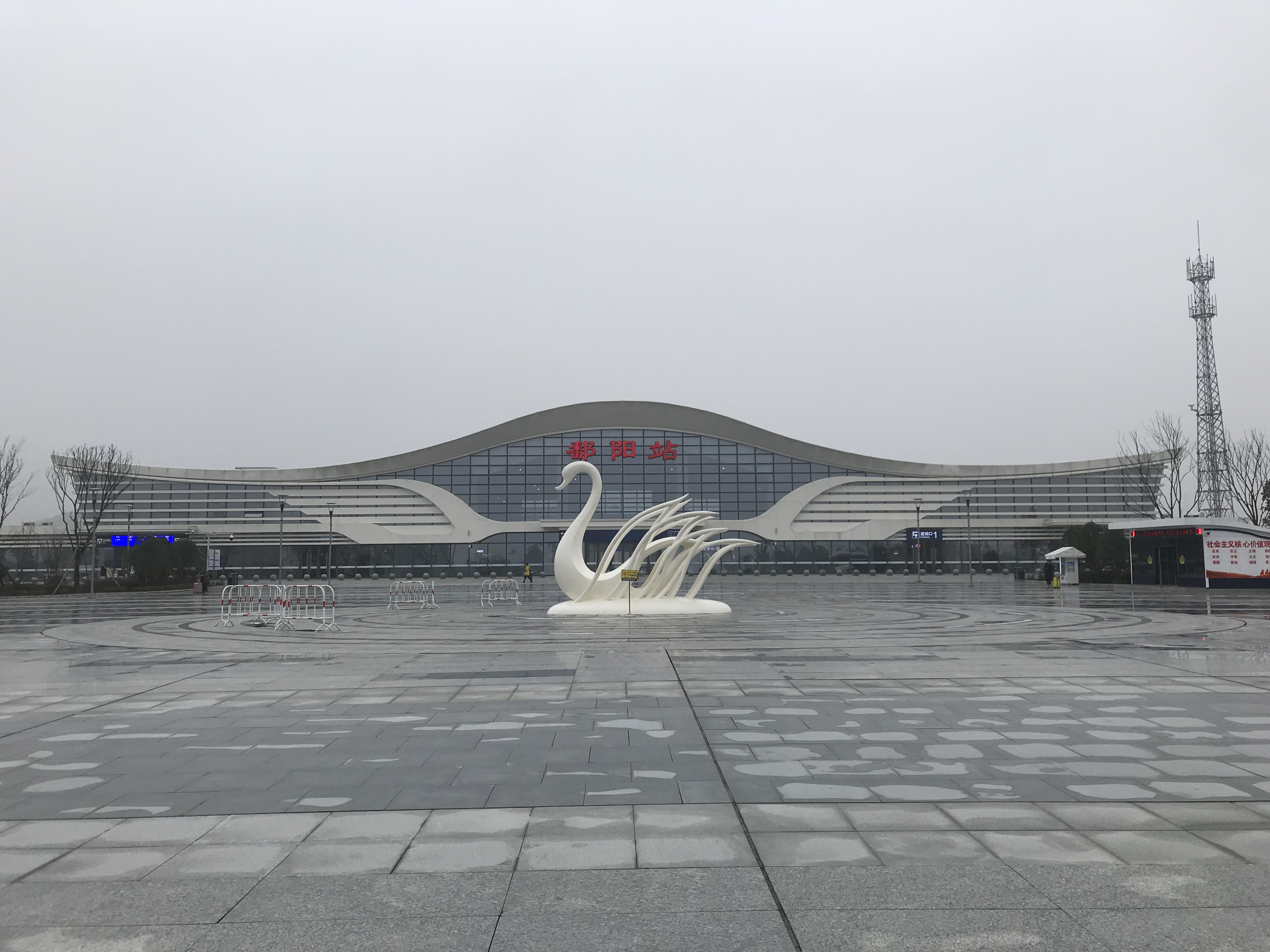

General information
- Location: Poyang County, Shangrao, Jiangxi; China
- Coordinates: 29.3365°N 116.8895°E
- Operated by: China Railway
- Line: Jiujiang–Quzhou railway

History
- Opened: 28 December 2017
Location

Poyang railway station (Chinese: 鄱阳站; pinyin: Póyáng Zhàn) is a railway station on the Jiujiang–Quzhou railway in Poyang County, Shangrao, Jiangxi, China. It is under the jurisdiction of the Jiujiang section of China Railway Nanchang Group.

== History ==
The station opened with the Jiujiang–Quzhou railway on 28 December 2017.

== Gallery ==
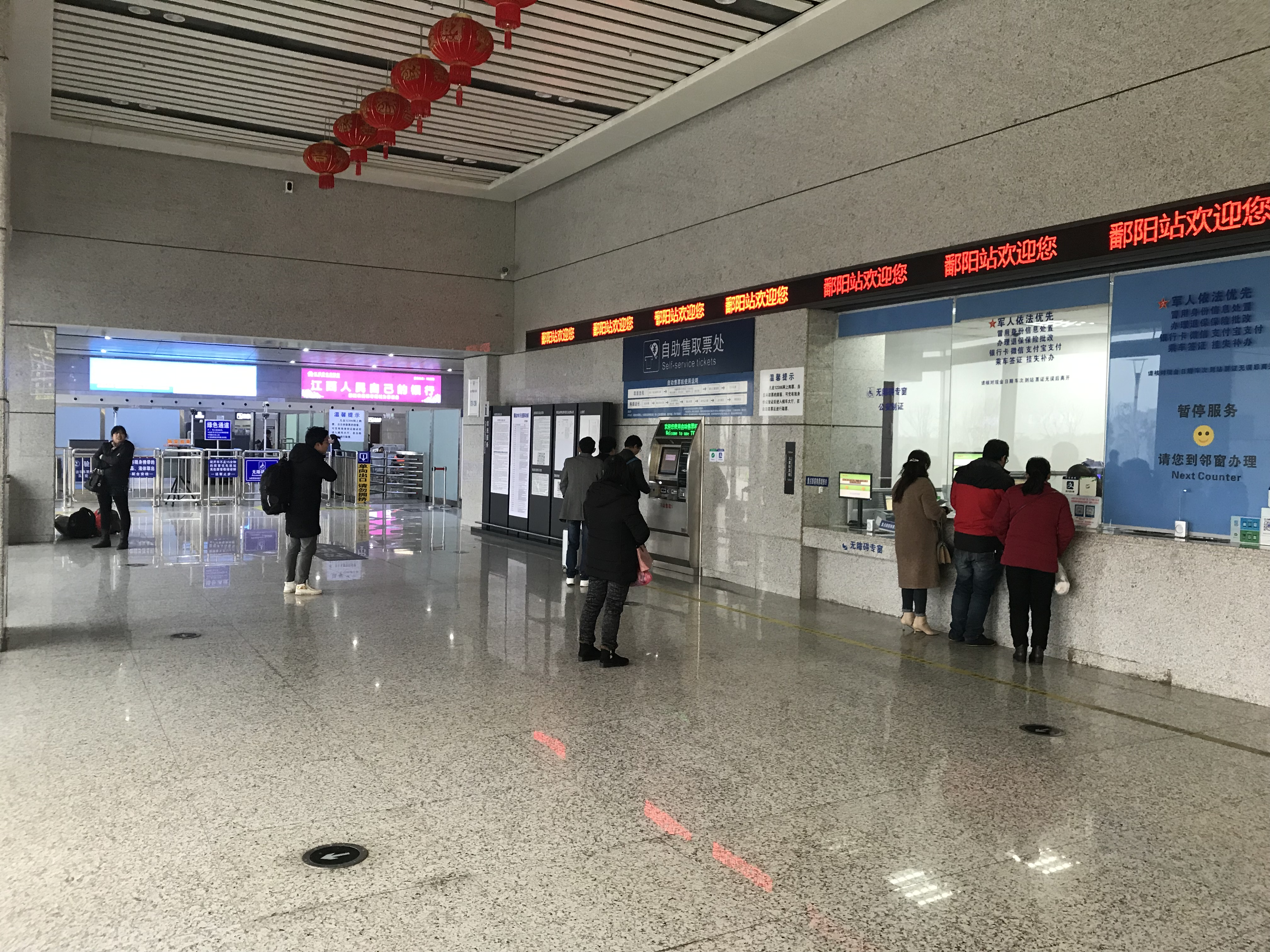
Ticket Room

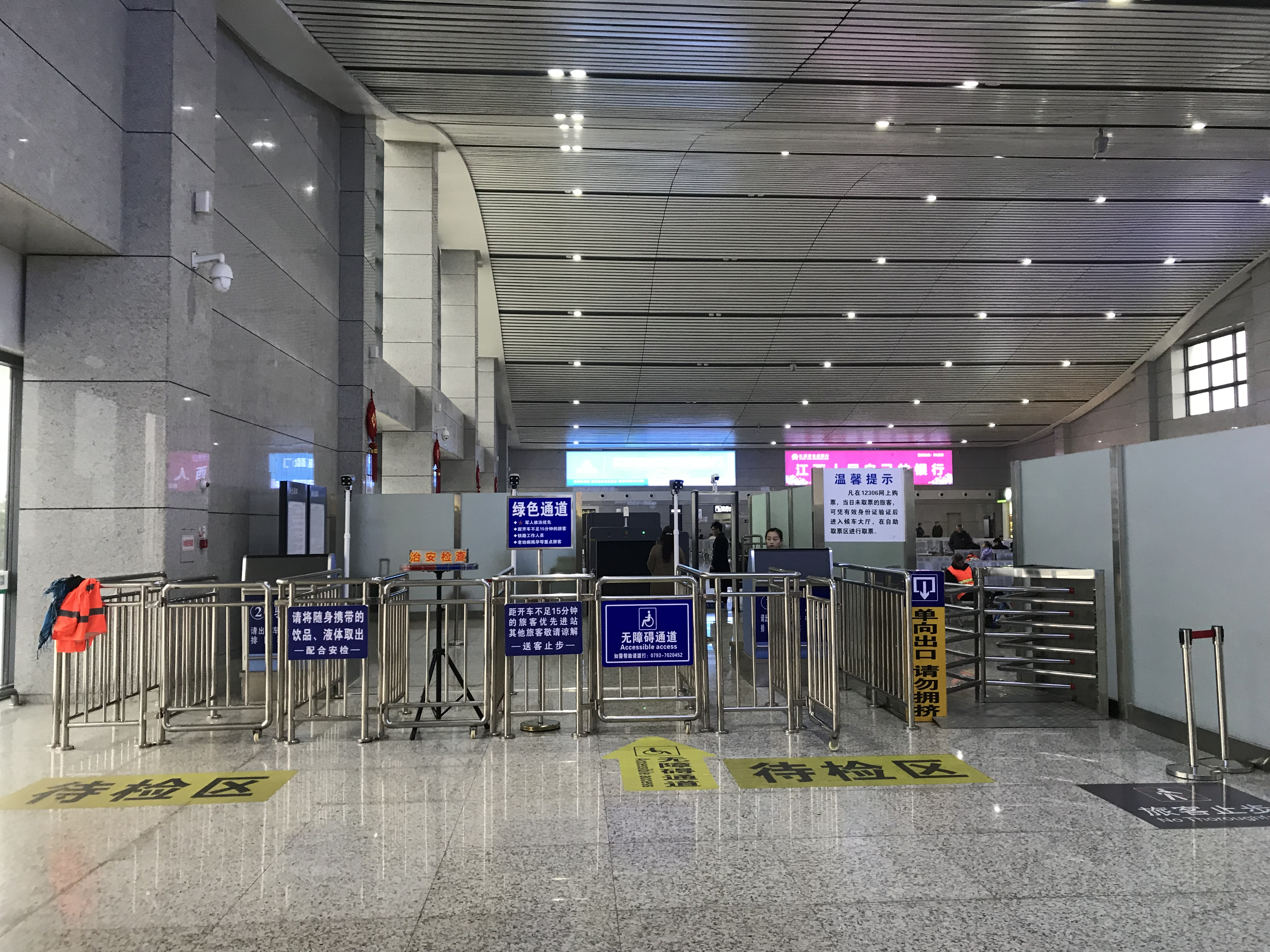
Entrance

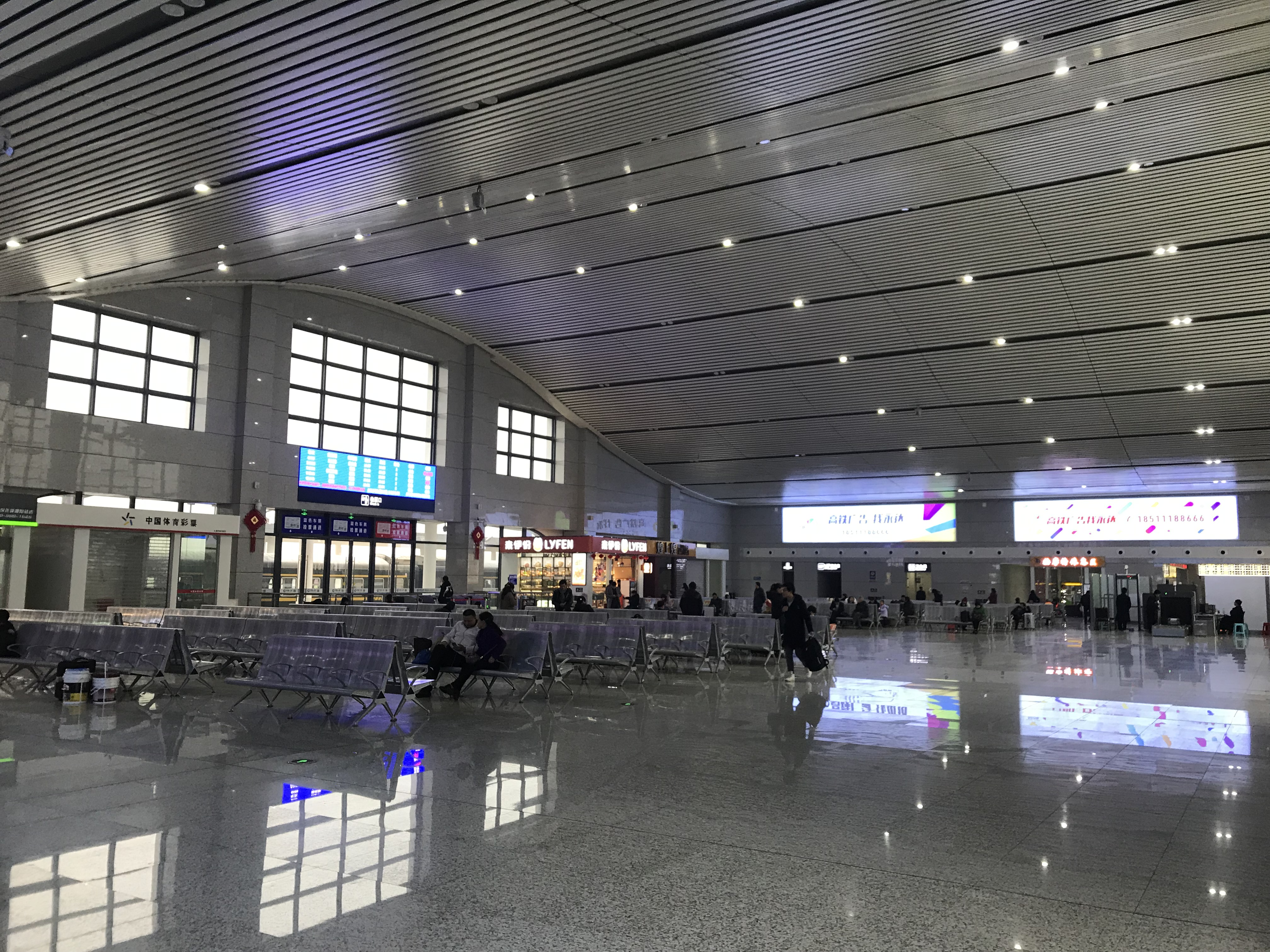
Waiting Room

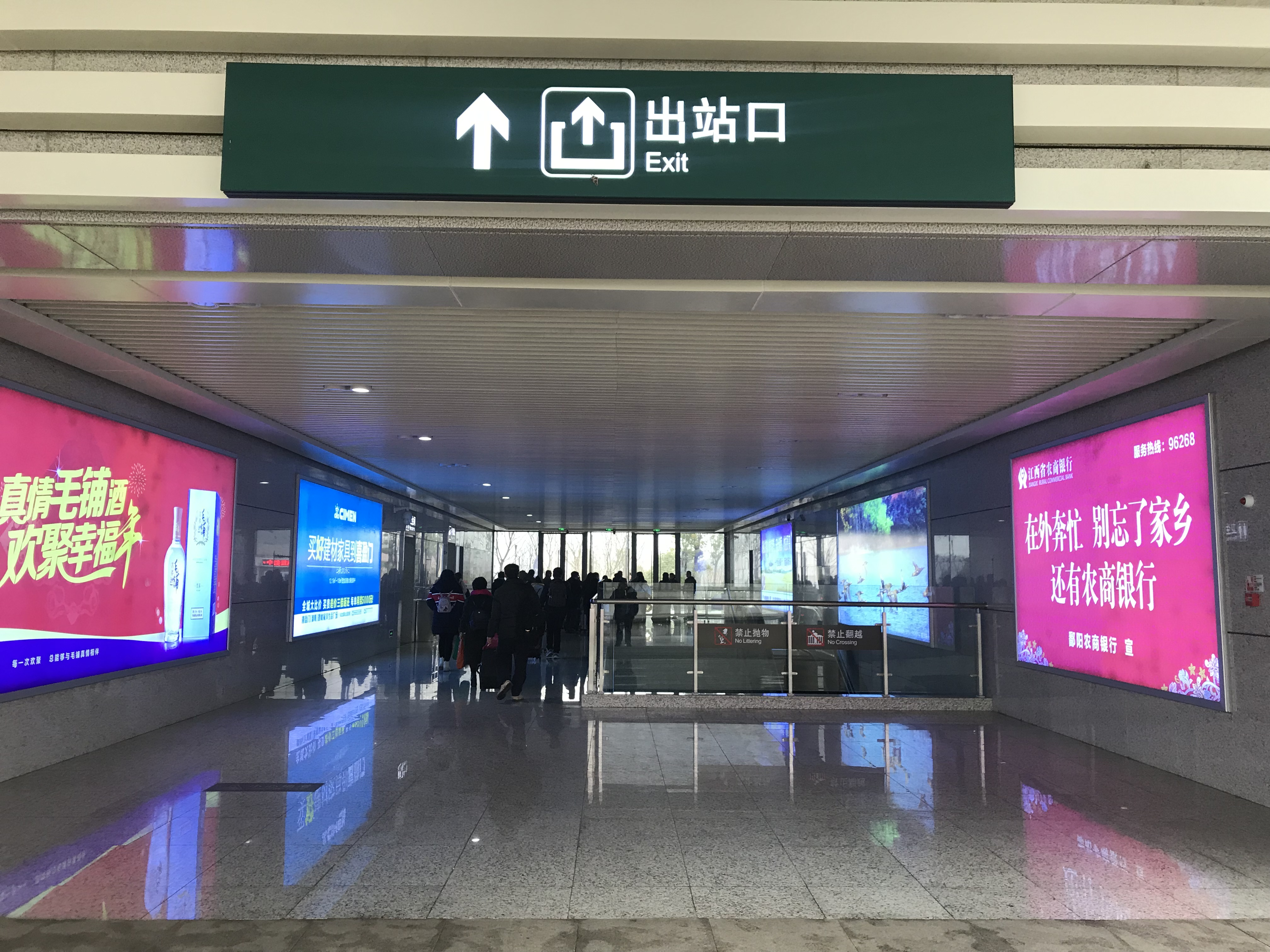
Exit

Preceding station	China Railway High-speed	Following station
Duchang towards Jiujiang	Jiujiang–Quzhou railway	Jingdezhen North towards Quzhou
