= Wang Xu =

Chinese warlord during Tang dynasty

Wang Xu (王緒; d. 886) was a warlord the late Chinese Tang dynasty, who controlled Guang Prefecture (光州, in modern Xinyang, Henan) as its prefect from 881 to 885. Subsequently, faced with material demands from Qin Zongquan, who had claimed imperial title, which Wang was unable to meet, Wang Xu forced the people and the soldiers of Guang Prefecture to abandon it and follow him in heading south to modern Fujian. Wang Xu was then overthrown by his subordinate Wang Chao, who eventually took over Fujian and whose family established the Five Dynasties and Ten Kingdoms period state Min.

== Background and takeover of Guang Prefecture ==
It is not known when Wang Xu was born, but it is known that he was from Shou Prefecture (壽州, in modern Lu'an, Anhui), and that he was a butcher. In 881, when the Tang realm was overrun by agrarian rebellions—the chief among which was the one led by Huang Chao, who went as far as capturing the imperial capital Chang'an (forcing then-reigning Emperor Xizong to flee to Chengdu) and declaring himself the emperor of a new state of Qi—Wang rose with his brother-in-law Liu Xingquan (劉行全) and, with their 500 men, seized control of Shou Prefecture. After a month, they also captured Guang Prefecture. Wang claimed the title of general, and his army grew to over 10,000 men. At that time, Qin Zongquan was the military governor (jiedushi) of Fengguo Circuit (奉國, headquartered in modern Zhumadian, Henan). Qin recommended to Emperor Xizong that Wang be made the prefect of Guang Prefecture, and Emperor Xizong agreed.

== Flight south to Fujian ==
Later on, however, Qin Zongquan had turned against the Tang imperial government and was on the cusp of claiming imperial title himself. He ordered Wang Xu to pay taxes to him. When Wang was unable to do so, he launched an army to attack Wang. Wang, in fear, gathered 5,000 soldiers from Guang and Shou Prefectures and forced the people to cross the Yangtze River to the south. His army roved through and pillaged Jiang (江州, in modern Jiujiang, Jiangxi), Hong (洪州, in modern Nanchang, Jiangxi), and Qian (虔州, in modern Ganzhou, Jiangxi) Prefectures. By spring 885, Wang had continued south and captured Ting (汀洲, in modern Longyan, Fujian) and Zhang (漳州, in modern Zhangzhou, Fujian) Prefectures, but was not able to hold either for long.

== Overthrow by Wang Chao and death ==
By the time that Wang Xu reached Zhang Prefecture, his army was running low on food. As the terrain in Fujian Circuit (福建, headquartered in modern Fuzhou, Fujian), which Zhang Prefecture belonged to, was rugged, he ordered that the old and the weak be abandoned. However, in violation of his order, his discipline officer Wang Chao and Wang Chao's brothers Wang Shengui (王審邽) and Wang Shenzhi continued to take their mother Lady Dong with them. Wang Xu rebuked them and threatened to put Lady Dong to death. They begged for Lady Dong's life, offering to die in her stead. Other officers also spoke on their behalf, and Wang Xu relented.

Meanwhile, by this point, Wang Xu had also become extremely paranoid, as he had been warned by a sorcerer that there was qi belonging to a king in his army, so he began to put to death anyone whom he considered to have talents surpassing his own—going as far as putting Liu Xingquan to death. The fact that Wang was willing to put someone as close to him as Liu to death terrified the other officers. When the army reached Na'an (南安, in modern Quanzhou, Fujian), Wang Chao persuaded Wang Xu's forward commander, who feared that he would be Wang Xu's next target, into turning against Wang Xu. The forward commander and Wang Chao thus laid an ambush for Wang Xu and, when he was caught off-guard, arrested him. Wang Chao initially wanted to support the forward commander to be the new leader, but the forward commander pointed out that it was Wang Chao's idea that allowed them to survive Wang Xu's cruelty, and so the army agreed to have Wang Chao become their leader.

Wang Chao initially wanted to take the army back north to their home in Guang Prefecture, but when they advanced to Sha (沙縣, in modern Sanming, Fujian), the locals, who were suffering under the heavy burdens of the local prefect (Liao Yanruo (廖彥若) the prefect of Quan Prefecture (泉州, in modern Quanzhou), asked that Wang Chao save them from Liao. Wang Chao thus put Quan Prefecture under siege, capturing it in fall 886. After doing so, he put Wang Xu under house arrest at a mansion. Wang Xu, unable to bear this shame, committed suicide.

== Notes and references ==
- Zizhi Tongjian, vols. 254, 256.
