= Wuyuan railway station =

Railway station in Jiangxi, China

Wuyuan 婺源
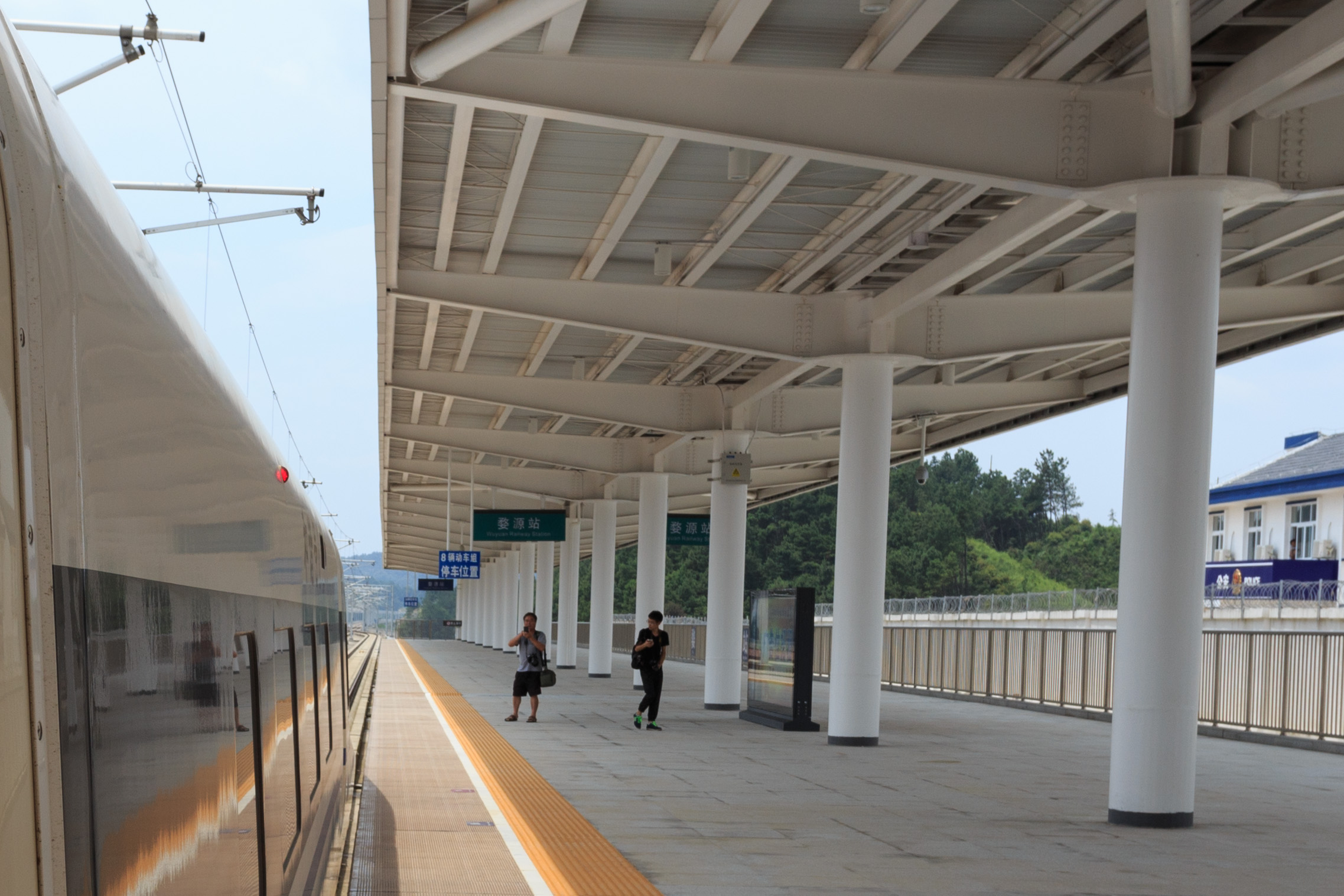

General information
- Location: Wuyuan County, Shangrao, Jiangxi; China
- Coordinates: 29°14′31″N 117°52′21″E
- Operator: China Railway
- Lines: Hefei–Fuzhou high-speed railway Jiujiang–Quzhou railway

Other information
- Station code: TMIS code: 34132; Telegraph code: WYG; Pinyin code: WYU
- Classification: 3rd class station

History
- Opened: June 28, 2015
Location

Wuyuan railway station (Chinese: 婺源站; pinyin: Wùyuán Zhàn) is a railway station of Hefei–Fuzhou high-speed railway in Wuyuan County, Jiangxi.

A statue of Zhan Tianyou, the pioneering Chinese railway engineer of Wuyuan origin, stands in front of the station.

== History ==
This station commenced services with Hefei-Fuzhou HSR on June 28, 2015. It became a junction with the opening of the Jiujiang–Quzhou railway on 28 December 2017.

Preceding station	China Railway High-speed	Following station
Huangshan North towards Hefei South	Hefei–Fuzhou high-speed railway	Dexing towards Fuzhou
Jingdezhen North towards Jiujiang	Jiujiang–Quzhou railway	Dexing East towards Quzhou
