= Liangzhe Circuit =

- Traditional Chinese: 兩浙路
- Hanyu Pinyin: Liǎngzhè Lù
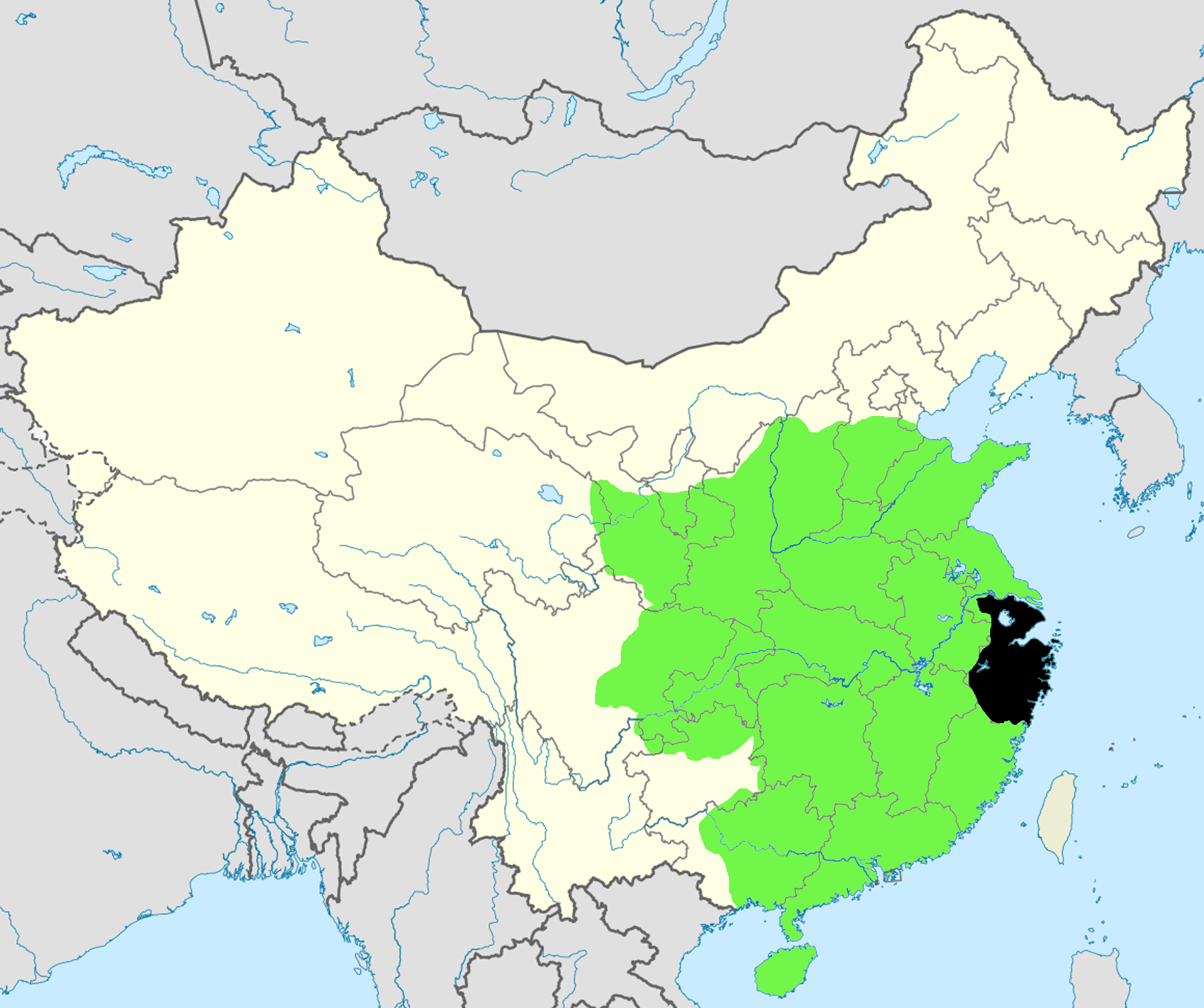
- Liangzhe Circuit within Song dynasty territory, c. 1100
- Population
  - 1102: ~10 million
  - 1162: ~11 million
- History
  - Preceded by: Zhejiang West Circuit; Zhejiang East Circuit
  - Created: 997 (Song dynasty)
  - Abolished: 1160s (Song dynasty)
  - Succeeded by: Liangzhe West Circuit; Liangzhe East Circuit
  - HQ: Hang Prefecture

Liangzhe Circuit (997–1160s) was one of the major circuits during the Song dynasty (960–1279). Its administrative area corresponds roughly to modern Zhejiang, Shanghai, and southern Jiangsu (the portion east of Changzhou, between Lake Tai and the Yangtze). The fertile Yangtze River Delta lay within Liangzhe Circuit, as did Lake Tai. Liangzhe was the wealthiest circuit in Song.

The capital of Liangzhe Circuit was Hang Prefecture (renamed Lin'an Prefecture in 1129, when it became the Song capital).

== History ==
Liangzhe Circuit was created in 997, about 19 years after the Wuyue (907–978) king Qian Chu surrendered his kingdom to the Song dynasty. The name Liangzhe (兩浙, "the Two Zhes") had been in use to refer to the two Tang dynasty (618–907) circuits East and West Zhejiang (Zhedong and Zhexi), both created in 758 and later controlled by Wuyue. Liangzhe Circuit was not identical to the territory of the Wuyue realm: it included former Southern Tang prefectures like Chang Prefecture and Run Prefecture, but not Fu Prefecture.

In 1074, Liangzhe Circuit was divided into 2 circuits: East and West Liangzhe, but quickly recombined. After another brief split between 1076 and 1077, Liangzhe Circuit was permanently split in two in the 1160s. (In 1127, following the Jingkang incident, Zhao Gou (Emperor Gaozong) reestablished the Song dynasty in Hang Prefecture, which he renamed to Lin'an Prefecture in 1129.)
