= Chen Yan (governor) =

Chinese warlord (died 891)

- Traditional Chinese: 陳巖
- Simplified Chinese: 陈岩
Transcriptions
Standard Mandarin
- Hanyu Pinyin: Chén Yán

Chen Yan (d. 891) was a Chinese warlord in Fujian during the late Tang dynasty. He served as governor (观察使 guāncháshǐ) of the Fujian Circuit, headquartered in what is now Fuzhou.

== Life ==
It is not known when Chen Yan was born, but it is known that he was from Jian Prefecture (建州 now Nanping). In or around 878, when the major agrarian rebel Huang Chao was pillaging the Fujian region on his way south toward Guang Prefecture (廣州 in modern Guangzhou, Guangdong), Chen gathered several thousand men around him to protect their home territory, and named the army Jiulong Army (九龍軍). Then-governor of Fujian, Zheng Yi (鄭鎰) thus made Chen his deputy in his position as the military prefect (團練使 Tuanlianshi) of Fujian's capital Fu (now Fuzhou).

While Chen was serving as deputy military prefect, there was an occasion when Li Lian (李連) the prefect of Quan Prefecture (泉州, in modern Quanzhou, Fujian) was found guilty of a crime. Fearful of punishment, Li hid in mountainous caves and gathered troops to attack Fu Prefecture. Chen led his army and repelled Li's attack. Zheng became apprehensive of Chen's hold on the army, and he made a recommendation to then-reigning Emperor Xizong that Chen be made the governor instead. In 884, Emperor Xizong approved of the request, and Chen became governor. It was said that Chen ruled with authority and grace, and that the people of the region were pacified. His rule extended over the entire Fujian region, with such places as Ting Prefecture (汀州 modern Longyan, Fujian) and Jian Prefecture falling under his command of the circuit government in Chen's later life. At some point, his family and that of Dong Chang, the military governor (Jiedushi) of neighboring Weisheng Circuit (威勝 headquartered in modern Shaoxing, Zhejiang), entered into a marriage relationship.

In 886, Wang Chao, the leader of a roving army that had originated from Guang Prefecture (光州 in modern Xinyang, Henan), captured Quan Prefecture and killed its then-prefect Liao Yanrou (廖彥若). However, hearing of Chen's might, Wang did not dare to attack Fu Prefecture, and sent messengers to submit to Chen. Chen made Wang the prefect of Quan Prefecture.

In 891, Chen Yan fell ill. He sent messengers to summon Wang Chao, intending to entrust the circuit to him. However, before Wang could arrive, Chen died. Chen's brother-in-law Fan Hui (范暉) persuaded the soldiers to support him, and Fan and Wang subsequent engaged in several years of warfare. In 893, Fu Prefecture fell to the siege by Wang's cousin Wang Yanfu (王彥復) and brother Wang Shenzhi, and Fan was killed in flight. Wang took over the circuit governorship. He buried Chen with respect, and gave a daughter in marriage to Chen's son Chen Yanhui (陳延晦).

== Family ==
Chen's eldest son was subsequently revered as the "God of Yanyu in Fuzhou" (福州演屿神 Fuzhou Yanyu Shen). He is credited with miraculously saving Lu Yundi (路允迪) on his 1122 delegation to Korea to pay formal respects upon the death of its king Yejong and to replace the Liao as the formal suzerains investing his successor Injong. The God of Yanyu's temple was subsequently known as the Zhaoli ("Manifesting Merit") Temple by imperial proclamation. The miracle was also credited to Mazu, the deified form of the Meizhou shamaness Lin Moniang.
