= Zhou Bangyan =

Song dynasty poet

- Traditional Chinese: 周邦彥
- Simplified Chinese: 周邦彦
Transcriptions
Standard Mandarin
- Hanyu Pinyin: Zhōu Bāngyàn
- Wade–Giles: Chou^{1} Pang^{1}-yen^{4}
- IPA: [ʈʂóʊ páŋ.jɛ̂n]
Yue: Cantonese
- Yale Romanization: Jāu Bōng-yihn
- Jyutping: Zau^{1} Bong^{1}-jin^{6}
- IPA: [tsɐw˥ pɔŋ˥.jin˨]
Southern Min
- Hokkien POJ: Chiu Pang-gān

Zhou Bangyan (Chinese: 周邦彥; 1056–1121) was a Chinese musician, poet, and politician of the Northern Song dynasty. He was from Qiantang (in modern Hangzhou). His courtesy name was Meicheng (Chinese: 美成; pinyin: Měichéng), and his art name was Qingzhen Jushi (Chinese: 清真居士; pinyin: Qīngzhēn Jūshì). He left a two-volume poetry anthology called either the Qingzhen-ji or the Pianyu-ci.

== Biography ==
=== Birth and early life ===
Zhou Bangyan was born in 1056. (Note: Sargent (2001, paragraph 19), Murakami (1994), Britannica Kokusai Dai-Hyakkajiten and Hightower (1977) citing Wang Guowei give 1056, but Murakami (1998) gives 1058.) He was a native of Qiantang (錢塘/钱塘 Qiántáng, modern-day Hangzhou, Zhejiang Province).

=== Political career ===
At the age of 23, Zhou went to live in the capital Bianliang as a student at the National Academy. In 1083 he published "Rhapsody on the capital" (汴都賦 Biandu fu), which described the bustle of Bianliang while also praising the Song dynasty's accomplishments. The poem pleased Emperor Shenzong, and Zhou was appointed Supervisor at the National Academy (太學正/太学正 taixuezheng).

In 1087, at the age of 31, Zhou was sent to Lu Prefecture in Anhui where he worked as an instructor (教授). He stayed in the provinces for ten years, mostly as Sub-prefect of Lishui County in Jiangsu, before Emperor Zhezong recalled him in 1097 to be Registrar of the National Academy (國子主簿). He found favour with Emperor Zhezong and his successor Emperor Huizong, and thereafter rose through the ranks in the central government. He left the capital in 1112 to serve as Prefect of Longde-fu (隆德府, in the area of present-day Changzhi) and Mingzhou (明州), before returning in 1116 to become Director of the Palace Library (秘書監), the highest position he received.

=== Later life and death ===
In 1118 Zhou was again assigned a prefectural post. After three transfers, he died in Nanjing (present-day Shangqiu) in 1121, aged 66. (Note: Sargent (2001, paragraph 19), Murakami (1994), Britannica Kokusai Dai-Hyakkajiten, and Hightower (1977) citing Wang Guowei give 1121, but Murakami (1998) gives 1123.)

== Names ==
His courtesy name was Meicheng, and his art name was Qingzhen Jushi.

== Works ==
Zhou is especially famous as a composer of ci, a form of poetry that began in the Tang era and flourished during the Song dynasty. His complex and elegant poetic style is noted for its polished and elaborate form, and has been praised as "simple and honest, and elegant" (渾厚和雅). His two-volume poetry anthology is called the Qingzhen-ji (清真集) or the Pianyu-ci (片玉詞).

Zhou was a noted composer of tunes and lyrics, working in close association with the imperial Music Bureau (大晟府 Dashengfu), (Note: Previously it was thought that he rose to the position of superintendent of the bureau, and Hightower (1977), Murakami (1994, 1998) and Britannica Kokusai Dai-Hyakkajiten cite this as fact, but recent research cited by Zhou Huarao (2014, p. 5) indicates that this was not the case.) which presided over court music. He was a proficient musician, and set many of his own poems to music.

== Reception ==
He became known as the "Patriarch of Ci Poets" (詞家正宗), and is listed along with Liu Yong, Xin Qiji and Jiang Kui as the "Four Great Ci Poets". His poetry served as a model for ci poets of later eras, with many imitators among the Southern Song literati. One example is the He Qingzhen-ci (和清真詞) by Fang Qianli (方千里).

Chen Yuanlong (陳元龍) of the Southern Song composed a ten-volume commentary on his poetry entitled Pianyu-ji (片玉集).

== Works cited ==
- "Zhou Bang-yan (Shū Hōgen in Japanese)". Britannica Kokusai Dai-Hyakkajiten (in Japanese). Encyclopædia Britannica, Inc. 2014.
- Hightower, James R. (1977). "The Songs of Chou Pang-yen". Harvard Journal of Asiatic Studies. 37 (2): 233–272. doi:10.2307/2718675. JSTOR 2718675.
- Murakami, Tetsumi (1994). "Zhou Bang-yan (Shū Hōgen in Japanese)". Encyclopedia Nipponica (in Japanese). Shogakukan.
- Murakami, Tetsumi (1998). "Zhou Bang-yan (Shū Hōgen in Japanese)". World Encyclopedia (in Japanese). Heibonsha.
- Sargent, Stuart (2001). "Chapter 15: Tz'u". In Mair, Victor H. (ed.). The Columbia History of Chinese Literature. New York: Columbia University Press. ISBN 0-231-10984-9.
- Zhou Huarao (2014). The Lyrics of Zhou Bangyan (1056-1121): In between Popular and Elite Cultures (PDF) (PhD thesis). University of Toronto.
