= Lin'an Prefecture =

Capital of the Southern Song dynasty

Coordinates: 30.2666°N 120.1666°E

- Traditional Chinese: 臨安府
- Hanyu Pinyin: Lín'ān Fǔ
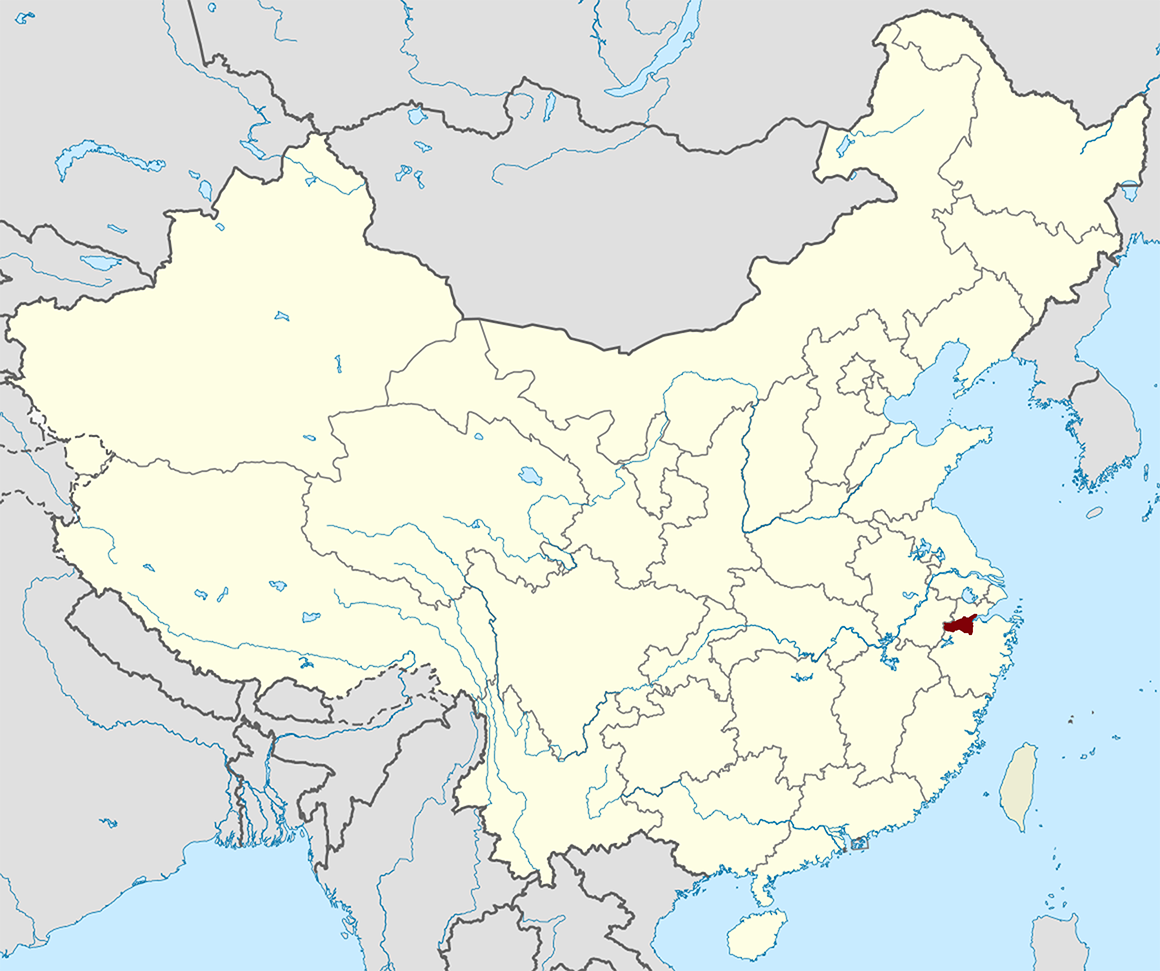
- History
  - Preceded by: Hang Prefecture
  - Created: 1129 (Song dynasty)
  - Abolished: 1277 (Yuan dynasty)
  - Succeeded by: Hangzhou Prefecture
  - HQ: Qiantang (錢塘)
- Contained within
  - Circuit: Liangzhe Circuit (before 1160s); Liangzhe West Circuit (after 1160s)

Lin'an Prefecture (1129–1277) was, after 1138, the capital of the Southern Song dynasty (1127–1279). With over one million people by 1276, it was the most populous city in the world. Lin'an Prefecture was located in modern northern Zhejiang around Hangzhou. Its administrative area is different from that of the modern prefecture-level city of Hangzhou.

Lin'an Prefecture fell to the Mongols in 1276.
