= Jiujiang–Quzhou railway =

Railway line between Zhejiang and Jiangxi

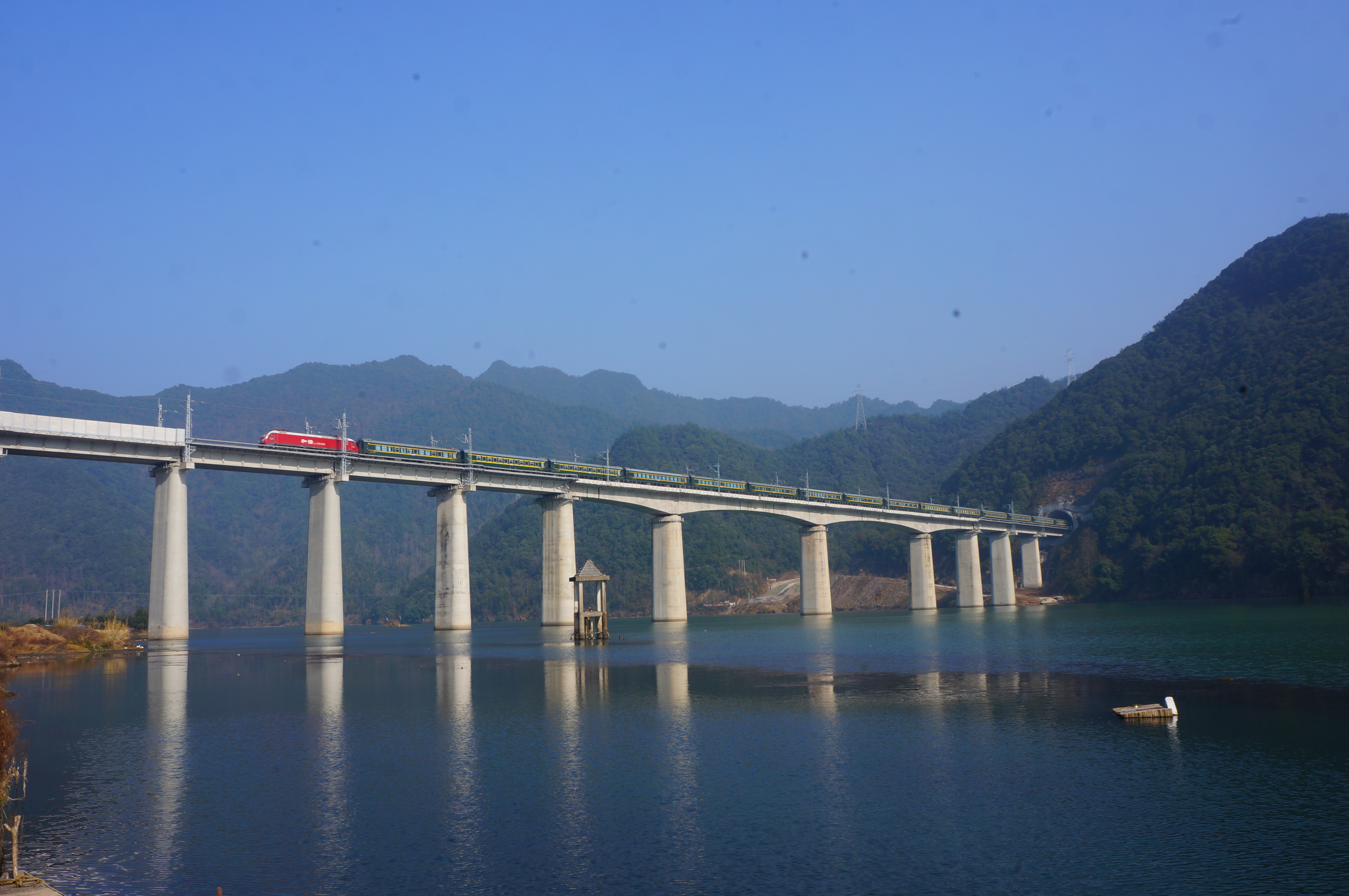
- A train crossing a bridge in Kaihua

Overview
- Status: Operational
- Termini: Jiujiang; Quzhou
- Stations: 10

Service
- Type: Heavy rail

History
- Opened: 28 December 2017

Technical
- Line length: 333 km (207 mi)
- Track gauge: 1,435 mm (4 ft 8 1/2 in) standard gauge
- Minimum radius: 3,500m 2,800m (difficult sections)
- Electrification: 50 Hz 25,000 V
- Operating speed: 200 km/h (124 mph)

The Jiujiang–Quzhou railway is an electrified railway in China. The line is 333 kilometres (207 mi) long and has a design speed of 200 kilometres per hour (120 mph).

== History ==
The railway opened on 28 December 2017.

== Stations ==
The line has the following passenger stations:

- Quzhou (interchange with the Quzhou–Ningde railway, Shanghai–Kunming high-speed railway, and the Shanghai–Kunming railway)
- Changshan
- Kaihua
- Dexing East
- Wuyuan (interchange with the Hefei–Fuzhou high-speed railway)
- Jingdezhen North (interchange with the Nanchang–Huangshan high-speed railway)
- Poyang
- Duchang
- Hukou (interchange with the Tongling–Jiujiang railway)
- Pipahu
- Jiujiang (interchange with the Tongling–Jiujiang railway, Wuhan–Jiujiang railway, Nanchang–Jiujiang intercity railway, Hefei–Jiujiang railway, and the Beijing–Kowloon railway)
