= Wang Chao (Tang dynasty) =

Warlord during the Chinese Tang dynasty

Wang Chao 王潮
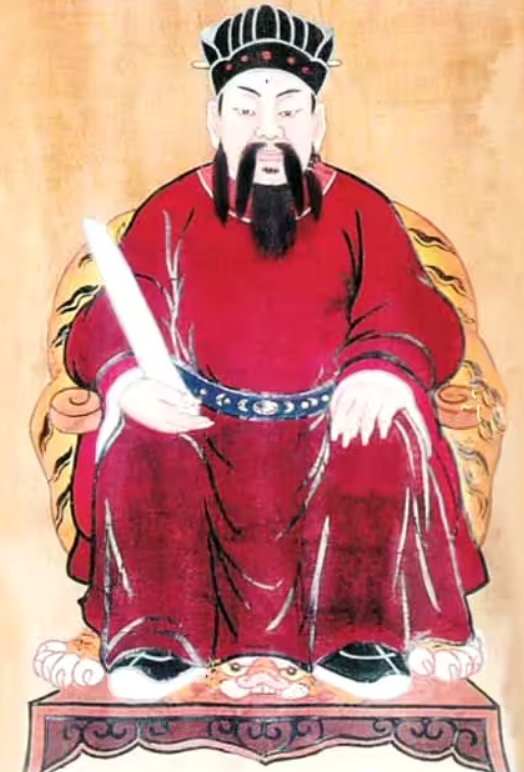

Jiedushi of Weiwu Circuit (威武軍節度使)
- In office 897–898
- Succeeded by: Wang Shenzhi

Guanchashi of Fujian (福建觀察使)
- In office 893–897
- Preceded by: Fang Hui

Personal details
- Born: April 10, 846 Gushi County
- Died: January 2, 898 (aged 51)
- Resting place: in modern Hui'an County, Quanzhou

Wang Chao (王潮) (April 10, 846 – January 2, 898), courtesy name Xinchen (信臣) was a warlord of the Chinese Tang dynasty, who controlled Fujian Circuit (福建道, headquartered in modern Fuzhou, Fujian), eventually establishing the base of power for his family members to later establish the Five Dynasties and Ten Kingdoms period state Min.

== Background ==
Wang Chao was born in 846, during the reign of Emperor Wuzong. His fifth-generation ancestor Wang Ye (王曄) served as the magistrate of Gushi County (固始, in modern Xinyang, Henan), and because the people loved him, he settled his family in Gushi. The family subsequently became known for their family business. Wang Chao himself served as a government worker at the Gushi County government. His father's name was Wang Nin (王恁), and his mother was a Lady Dong. He had two younger brothers, Wang Shengui (王審邽) and Wang Shenzhi.

== Service under Wang Xu ==
In 881, with the Tang state overrun by agrarian rebellions, Wang Xu and his brother-in-law Liu Xingquan (劉行全), who were from Shou Prefecture (壽州, in modern Lu'an, Anhui), started a rebellion of their own and seized Shou, and then Guang (光州, in modern Xinyang), which Gushi County belonged to. Wang obtained a commission from the nearby warlord Qin Zongquan the military governor (Jiedushi) of Fengguo Circuit (奉國, headquartered in modern Zhumadian, Henan) as the prefect of Guang Prefecture. He forced the local men to serve in his army, and among the men he took into his army were Wang Chao and his brothers Wang Shengui and Wang Shenzhi. He made Wang Chao his discipline officer and favored Wang Chao.

Later on, however, Qin turned against the Tang imperial government and was on the cusp of claiming imperial title himself. He ordered Wang Xu to pay taxes to him. When Wang Xu was unable to do so, he launched an army to attack Wang. Wang Xu, in fear, gathered 5,000 soldiers from Guang and Shou Prefectures and forced the people to cross the Yangtze River to the south. By spring 885, Wang had continued south and captured Ting (汀洲, in modern Longyan, Fujian) and Zhang (漳州, in modern Zhangzhou, Fujian) Prefectures, but was not able to hold either for long.

== Overthrow of Wang Xu and takeover of Quan Prefecture ==
By the time that Wang Xu reached Zhang Prefecture, his army was running low on food. As the terrain in Fujian Circuit (福建, headquartered in modern Fuzhou, Fujian), which Zhang Prefecture belonged to, was rugged, he ordered that the old and the weak be abandoned. However, in violation of his order, Wang Chao and his brothers continued to take their mother Lady Dong with them. Wang Xu rebuked them and threatened to put Lady Dong to death. They begged for Lady Dong's life, offering to die in her stead. Other officers also spoke on their behalf, and Wang Xu relented.

Meanwhile, by this point, Wang Xu had also become extremely paranoid, as he had been warned by a sorcerer that there was qi belonging to a king in his army, so he began to put to death anyone whom he considered to have talents surpassing his own — going as far as putting Liu Xingquan to death. The fact that Wang was willing to put someone as close to him as Liu to death terrified the other officers. When the army reached Na'an (南安, in modern Quanzhou, Fujian), Wang Chao persuaded Wang Xu's forward commander, who feared that he would be Wang Xu's next target, into turning against Wang Xu. The forward commander and Wang Chao thus laid an ambush for Wang Xu and, when he was caught off-guard, arrested him. Wang Chao initially wanted to support the forward commander to be the new leader, but the forward commander pointed out that it was Wang Chao's idea that allowed them to survive Wang Xu's cruelty, and so the army agreed to have Wang Chao become their leader.

Wang Chao initially wanted to take the army back north to their home in Guang Prefecture, but when they advanced to Sha (沙縣, in modern Sanming, Fujian), the locals, who were suffering under the heavy burdens of the local prefect (Liao Yanruo (廖彥若) the prefect of Quan Prefecture (泉州, in modern Quanzhou)), asked that Wang Chao save them from Liao. Wang Chao thus put Quan Prefecture under siege, capturing it in fall 886. He put Liao to death and Wang Xu under house arrest. (Wang Xu subsequently committed suicide.) As then-governor (觀察使, Guanchashi) of Fujian Circuit, Chen Yan, had a good reputation, Wang Chao decided not to go against Chen, and instead sent messengers to Fujian's capital Fu Prefecture (福州) to submit to Chen. Chen commissioned Wang Chao as the prefect of Quan Prefecture. It was said that Wang Chao governed Quan with intelligence, gathering the scattered people, alleviating the tax burden, rebuilding the army, and drew support from the people and the army.

== Takeover of the rest of Fujian Circuit ==
In 891, Chen Yan fell seriously ill. He sent messengers to summon Wang Chao to Fu Prefecture, intending to transfer the governorship to him. Before Wang could head to Fu Prefecture, however, Chen died. Chen's brother-in-law, the officer Fan Hui (范暉), persuaded the soldiers to support him as acting governor and mobilized troops to resist Wang.

Fan, however, grew extravagant and arrogant, losing the support of the soldiers. In 892, Wang Chao commissioned his cousin Wang Yanfu (王彥復) as the commander and Wang Shenzhi as Wang Yanfu's deputy, to take an army to attack Fu Prefecture. It was said that the common Han people supported him by supplying food for the army, and the local non-Han supported him by supplying soldiers and ships.

Wang Yanfu's and Wang Shenzhi's siege of Fu Prefecture, however, became bogged down due to the strong defenses that Fu Prefecture had, and Fan sought aid from Dong Chang the military governor of Weisheng Circuit (威勝, headquartered in modern Shaoxing, Zhejiang), who was also related by marriage to Chen. Dong sent an army south to aid Fan. Wang Yanfu and Wang Shenzhi, hearing that Dong's army was about to arrive, reported to Wang Chao and requested to withdraw. Wang Chao refused. When they requested that he come to the front to oversee the attack, he responded:

If soldiers die, I will replace the soldiers. If the generals die, I will replace the generals. If the soldiers and the generals all are dead, I will go myself.

Wang Yanfu and Wang Shenzhi, fearful of the rebuke, intensified their attacks. By summer 893, the food supply in Fu Prefecture ran out. Fan abandoned it and fled, and the Weisheng army, still on the way, hearing that Fan had fled, returned to Weisheng. Fan was killed by his soldiers in flight. Wang entered Fu Prefecture and claimed the title of acting governor. He buried Chen with great honors, and he gave a daughter in marriage to Chen's son Chen Yanhui (陳延晦). Subsequently, two prefectures that had held out against Chen, Ting and Jian (建州, in modern Nanping, Fujian), also submitted to him. Some 20 groups of bandits also either submitted or were destroyed by him, pacifying the circuit. Then-reigning Emperor Zhaozong subsequently made Wang the governor in late 893. It was said that Wang encouraged farming, set fair tax rates, fostered friendly relations with the nearby circuits, and allowed the people to rest. In 896, Emperor Zhaozong made Fujian Circuit into Weiwu Circuit (威武) and gave Wang the greater title of military governor.

== Death and succession ==
While Wang Chao served as military governor, Wang Shenzhi served as deputy military governor. It was said that when Wang Shenzhi had faults, Wang Chao would batter him, but Wang Shenzhi would not show any resentment to the treatment. When Wang Chao grew seriously ill in 897, instead of trying to transfer the military governorship to one of his four sons (Wang Yanxing (王延興), Wang Yanhong (王延虹), Wang Yanfeng (王延豐), Wang Yanxiu (王延休)), he entrusted the administration of the circuit to Wang Shenzhi. He died around new year 898. After his death, Wang Shenzhi offered the military governorship to Wang Shengui, who was then serving as the prefect of Quan Prefecture, because Wang Shengui was older, but Wang Shengui declined on the basis that Wang Shenzhi had greater accomplishments. Wang Shenzhi subsequently claimed the title of acting military governor, and Emperor Zhaozong confirmed him as military governor. Wang Shenzhi would eventually receive the title of Prince of Min from Zhu Wen (whose Later Liang succeeded Tang), and Wang Shenzhi's son Wang Yanjun would eventually claim the title of emperor of an independent state of Min, which would stand until 946.

== Notes and references ==
- New Book of Tang, vol. 190.
- Zizhi Tongjian, vols. 254, 256, 258, 259, 260, 261.
