= Yao He =

Chinese poet

Yao He (Chinese: 姚合) was a Chinese poet of the middle Tang dynasty. He was a great-grandson of chancellor Yao Chong. He was often called Yao Wugong (姚武功), and his poetry style was called "Wugong Style". Yao was very famous at his time. He knew Liu Yuxi, Li Shen, Zhang Ji, Wang Jian, Yang Juyuan, Ma Dai, Li Qunyu well, and was a close friend of Jia Dao. His style was very similar to Jia Dao, but was more tame and superficial.
