= Fu Prefecture (Fujian) =

Historical administrative division in Fujian, China

- Simplified Chinese: 福州
- Hanyu Pinyin: Fú Zhōu
- Population
  - 740s or 750s: 75,876
- History
  - Preceded by: Changle Commandery
  - Created: 725 (Tang dynasty); 758 (Tang dynasty)
  - Abolished: 1278 (Yuan dynasty)
  - Succeeded by: Fuzhou Circuit
- Contained within
  - Circuit: Jiangnan Circuit; Fujian Circuit

Fuzhou or Fu Prefecture was a zhou (prefecture) in imperial China in modern Fujian, China, seated in modern Fuzhou. It existed (intermittently) from 725 until 1278.

It was known as Changle Prefecture (長樂府) between 933 and 948 when it was the capital of Min. It was also briefly known as Fu'an Prefecture (福安府) between 1276 and 1277 when it was the capital of the Song dynasty.

The modern prefecture-level city Fuzhou retains its name.
