= Yue Prefecture (Zhejiang) =

Historical administrative division in Zhejiang, China

- Simplified Chinese: 越州
- Hanyu Pinyin: Yuè Zhōu
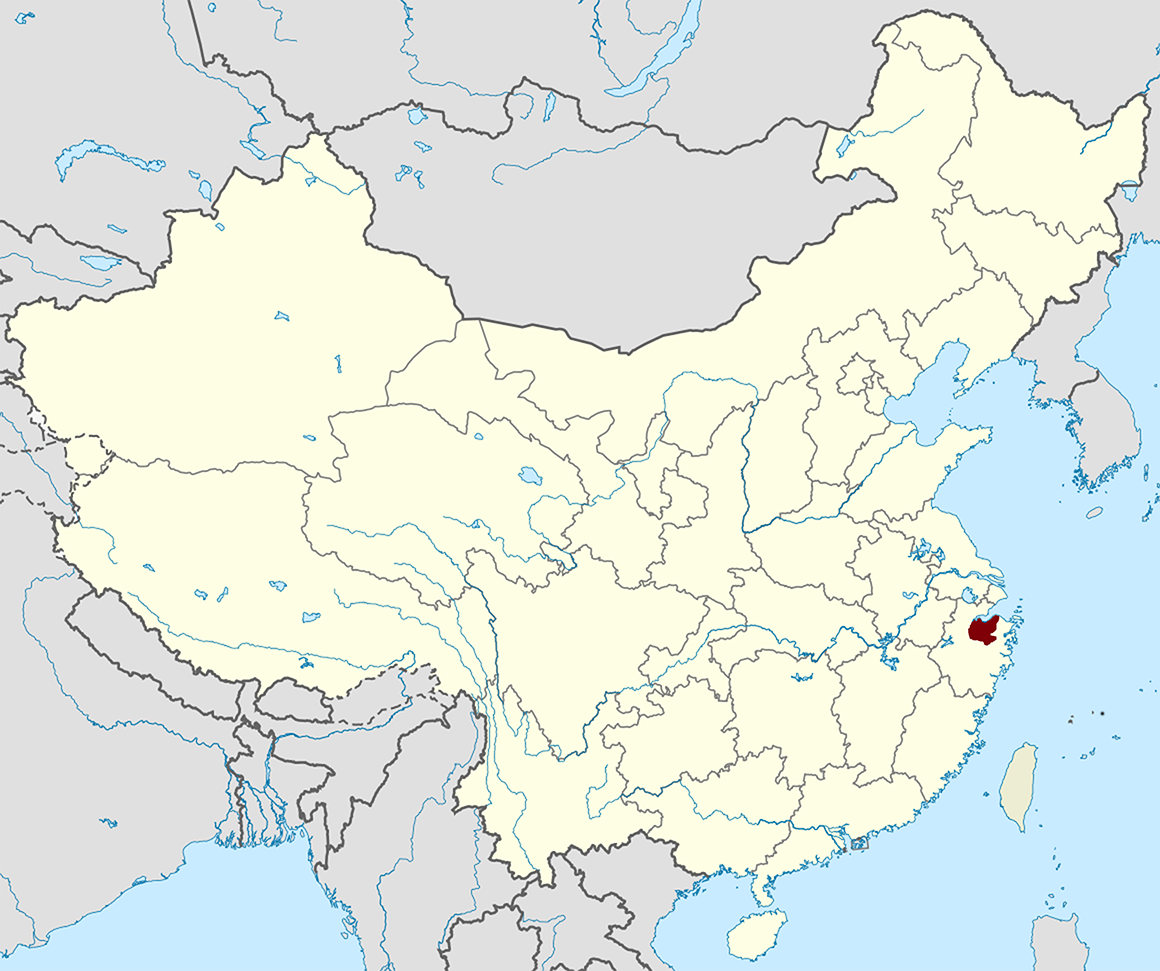
- Population
  - 740s or 750s: 529,589
  - 1100s: 367,390
- History
  - Preceded by: Kuaiji Commandery
  - Created: 605 (Sui dynasty); 621 (Tang dynasty); 758 (Tang dynasty)
  - Abolished: 1131 (Song dynasty)
  - Succeeded by: Shaoxing Prefecture
- Contained within
  - Circuit: Jiangnan Circuit (621–733); Jiangnan East Circuit (after 733); Zhejiang East Circuit (758–907)
  - Kingdom: Wuyue (907–978)
  - Circuit: Liangzhe Circuit (978–1074); Liangzhe East Circuit (after 1074)

Yuezhou or Yue Prefecture was a zhou (prefecture) in imperial China in modern Zhejiang, China, centering on modern Shaoxing. It existed (intermittently) from 605 until 1131, when it became Shaoxing Prefecture.

== Counties ==
Yue Prefecture administered the following counties (縣) through history:

#	Sui dynasty	Tang dynasty	Wuyue	Song dynasty	Modern location
1	Kuaiji (會稽)				Yuecheng District & Keqiao District, Shaoxing
2	Shanyin (山陰)				Yuecheng District & Keqiao District, Shaoxing
3	Shangyu (上虞)				Shangyu District, Shaoxing
4	Zhuji (諸暨)	Zhuji, 618–880s; Jiyang (暨陽), 880s–908	Zhuji		Zhuji
5	Shan (剡)		Shan (贍)	Shan (剡), 979–1121; Sheng (嵊), after 1121	Shengzhou
6	Shan (剡)		Xinchang (新昌)		Xinchang County
7	Yuyao (餘姚)				Yuyao
8	Xiaoshan (蕭山)				Xiaoshan District, Hangzhou
