= Run Prefecture =

Historical administrative division of Jiangsu, China

- Traditional Chinese: 潤州
- Simplified Chinese: 润州
Transcriptions
Standard Mandarin
- Hanyu Pinyin: Rùn Zhōu
- Wade–Giles: Jun^{2} Chou^{1}

Runzhou or Run Prefecture was a zhou (prefecture) in imperial China in modern Jiangsu, China, seated in modern Zhenjiang. It existed (intermittently) from 595 to 1113, when it became Zhenjiang Prefecture.

== Geography ==
The administrative region of Runzhou in the Tang dynasty falls within modern Jiangsu:

- Under the administration of Zhenjiang:
  - Zhenjiang
  - Jurong
  - Danyang
- Under the administration of Changzhou:
  - Changzhou (Jintan District)
- Under the administration of Nanjing:
  - Nanjing (Jiangning District)
