= Swords Into Plowshares (TV series) =

2026 Chinese historical TV series set in the Five Dynasties and Ten Kingdoms period

Chinese name
- Traditional Chinese: 太平年
- Simplified Chinese: 太平年
- Literal meaning: The Age of Peace
Transcriptions
- Genre: Historical drama
- Written by: Dong Zhe
- Directed by: Yang Lei; Lu Beike
- Starring: Bai Yu; Zhou Yutong; Zhu Yawen; Yu Haoming; Dong Yong; Ni Dahong
- Opening theme: Toast to Peace by Chen Xueran
- Ending theme: Ten Thousand Miles by Zhou Shen
- Composer: Chen Xueran
- Country of origin: China
- Original language: Mandarin
- No. of episodes: 48

Production
- Executive producers: Ma Jun; Yang Bei; Zhang Zhuo; An Ning; Wang Xiaoyan; Fan Feifei; Jiang Xiaohui; Yu Yanqin; Zhou Tianfang; Yao Renwei
- Producers: Xue Jijun; Zhao Yifang; Hua Xuanfei; Gong Zhengwen; Gong Yu; Cai Huaijun; Sun Zhonghuai; Fu Binxing; Ren Hongliang; Lu Zhengpin
- Cinematography: Liu Yi; Wu Lei; Xiao Hui
- Editor: Feng Qiheng
- Running time: 45 minutes per episode
- Production companies: Zhejiang Huace Film & TV Co., Ltd. Zhejiang Radio and Television Group; Jinkeqiao Cultural Tourism Group; Wasu Group
- Budget: ¥360 million

Original release
- Network: CCTV-1 iQiyi; Mango TV; Tencent Video
- Release: 23 January – 13 February 2026

Swords Into Plowshares (Chinese: 太平年; pinyin: Tàipíng Nián) is a 2026 Chinese historical television series directed by Yang Lei and Lu Beike, written by Dong Zhe, and starring Bai Yu, Zhou Yutong, Zhu Yawen, Yu Haoming, Dong Yong and Ni Dahong. Produced by Huace Film & TV, the 48-episode drama depicts the final years of the Five Dynasties and Ten Kingdoms period and the early Song dynasty, focusing on Qian Hongchu, the last king of Wuyue, and his historic decision to peacefully surrender his kingdom to the Song in 978 CE—a rare instance of bloodless national unification in Chinese history. The series premiered on CCTV-1 on January 23, 2026, airing daily at 20:00 China Standard Time, with simultaneous streaming on iQiyi, Mango TV, and Tencent Video.

== Synopsis ==
Set against the tumultuous final decades of the Five Dynasties and Ten Kingdoms period, The series chronicles the transformative journey of Qian Hongchu, the ninth prince of the Wuyue royal family, from a sheltered prince to a visionary ruler who achieved China's first peaceful unification.

Following the death of King Qian Yuanguan, Wuyue faces internal corruption and external threats. Five years later, nineteen-year-old Prince Qian Hongchu volunteers for a perilous mission to the Later Jin court in Bianliang. There, he witnesses the humiliation of Emperor Shi Chonggui before Khitan invaders and encounters two men who will shape his destiny: the brilliant young nobleman Guo Rong and the charismatic commander Zhao Kuangyin. Most fatefully, he meets chancellor Sang Weihan, the architect of the controversial cession of the Sixteen Prefectures, and the legendary statesman Feng Dao, who has served eleven emperors across four dynasties. In a haunting midnight conversation, Sang—awaiting execution—delivers a profound meditation on moral ambiguity to the young prince: "Right and wrong are immutable. Even a thousand years hence, they will remain unchanged". Meanwhile, Feng imparts his philosophy of pragmatic statecraft—prioritizing cultural preservation and civilian welfare over rigid dynastic loyalty—with the counsel that "one just only needs to do good deeds, do not worry about the future". These encounters leave an indelible mark on Qian Hongchu's political philosophy.

Returning to Wuyue transformed, Qian Hongchu abandons his leisurely existence to confront court corruption, eliminating the treacherous Cheng Zhaoyue and suppressing powerful clans. He forms a deep bond with Sun Taizhen, daughter of a maritime magnate, whose strategic brilliance matches his own. When succession crises claim his brothers Qian Hongzuo and Qian Hongzong, Qian Hongchu reluctantly assumes the throne.

The narrative parallels Wuyue's evolution with the chaotic transition of central plains regimes. As the Later Jin collapses, Later Han briefly flickers, and Later Zhou emerges under Guo Wei's founding, Qian Hongchu carefully navigates shifting allegiances. He maintains Wuyue's autonomy while acknowledging nominal suzerainty, a delicate balance requiring constant diplomatic finesse, drawing upon the lessons of flexibility and pragmatic governance learned from his formative journey north.

The death of Later Zhou's visionary Emperor Shizong Guo Rong triggers another upheaval. Zhao Kuangyin's Chenqiao Mutiny establishes the Song Dynasty, setting the stage for final reunification. As Song armies systematically conquer rival states, Qian Chu (renamed from Qian Hongchu) faces an existential dilemma. His chancellor Shen Yin urges resistance to preserve dynastic honor, while Cui Renji argues pragmatic surrender is the only path to "preserve the clan and save the people".

The decisive moment comes. Following Sun Taizhen's death and surrounded by Song forces, Qian Chu recalls the lessons of his northern journey—the futility of Sang Weihan's resistance, the wisdom of Feng Dao's flexibility, and the devastation war would bring to Jiangnan's prosperity. In a historic decision, he surrenders Wuyue's thirteen prefectures to the Song court, achieving China's first bloodless unification.

== Cast and characters ==
=== Main characters ===
- Bai Yu as Qian Hongchu/Qian Chu (錢弘俶/錢俶), the ninth prince and last king of Wuyue who ascends through palace intrigue at nineteen, navigates three decades of precarious sovereignty between contending empires, and ultimately achieves the historic "surrender of territory to Song", preserving his realm's prosperity and five hundred fifty thousand households through the courage to relinquish power for peace.
- Zhou Yutong as Sun Taizhen (孫太真), Qian Hongchu's consort. She evolves from an innocent young woman into a wise and supportive queen who understands and aids her husband's historic decision.
- Zhu Yawen as Zhao Kuangyin (趙匡胤), courtesy name Yuanlang(元朗), who rises from a Later Zhou general to become Emperor Taizu of Song, founder of the Song dynasty. A man of great talent and vision, he seeks unification through both military strength and peaceful means. Seizing the throne through the Chenqiao Mutiny, he ends the chaotic Five Dynasties period and establishes the Song Dynasty. After ascending, he peacefully dissolves the power of military aristocrats through the "Dismissing Generals with a Cup of Wine", consolidating a centralized system. Toward Qian Chu of Wuyue, he lays the foundation for peaceful unification.
- Yu Haoming as Chai Rong/Guo Rong (柴榮/郭榮), courtesy name Jungui(君貴), Emperor Shizong of Later Zhou, Zhao Kuangyin's lord and Qian Hongchu's friend. An emperor determined to end the chaos of the Five Dynasties, he dies prematurely, leaving his vision to his successors—Zhao Kuangyin.

=== Supporting characters ===
Wuyue

- Ni Dahong as Hu Jinsi (胡進思), a powerful three-generation statesman who served from the founding of Wuyue under Qian Liu through five successive kings, ultimately orchestrating the deposition of Qian Hongzong and enthronement of Qian Hongchu.
- Gao Yuqing as Hu Jing (胡璟), the astute and deliberately understated son of the powerful minister Hu Jinsi, who feigns indifference to political advancement while serving as Minister of Works, ultimately preserving his clan through strategic withdrawal.
- Bao Jianfeng as Shuiqiu Zhaoquan (水丘昭券), a revered Wuyue statesman celebrated as the "Foremost Gentleman of Wuyue", who serves as both mentor and father figure to Qian Hongchu while navigating the treacherous political landscape, ultimately meeting a tragic end when his entire family is slaughtered in a coup orchestrated by Hu Jinsi.
- You Yongzhi as Qian Yuanguan (錢元瓘), the second king of Wuyue and the father of the Qian princes, who dies from shock-induced madness after arsonists destroy the royal treasury, his original wish to pass the throne to his third son Qian Hongyou thwarted by Hu Jinsi's insistence on legitimate bloodline, resulting in the succession of his sixth son Qian Hongzuo instead.
- Guo Chong as Qian Hongjun (錢弘俊), the eldest adopted son of the Wuyue royal family who serves as Pacification Commissioner of the Eastern Prefecture before withdrawing from court affairs to return to his biological father's household, ultimately supporting his younger brother Qian Hongchu's historic decision to peacefully surrender the kingdom to the Song Dynasty.
- Liu Chang as Qian Hongyou/Sun Ben (錢弘侑/孫本), the illegitimate third son of Wuyue King Qian Yuanguan and Lady Yu, elder half-brother to Qian Hongchu and Sun Taizhen, who is deposed to commoner status and returns to Huanglong Island with his birth name Sun Ben, after a failed succession struggle.
- Wu Haochen as Qian Hongzuo (錢弘佐), the sixth prince and third king of Wuyue, and the elder brother of Qian Hongzong and Qian Hongchu who ascended the throne at age 14 and ruled for seven years until his death at 20.
- Zhu Jiaqi as Qian Hongzong (錢弘倧), the seventh prince and fourth king of Wuyue who briefly ruled for one year before being deposed and exiled by general Hu Jinsi, later succeeded by his younger brother Qian Hongchu.
- Qin Xiaoxuan as Qian Weizhi (錢惟治), the brilliant and capable adopted son of Qian Hongchu, originally the son of the deposed King Qian Hongzong, who serves as prefect of Taizhou and military commissioner.
- Wang Junhao as Qian Weijun (錢惟濬), the eldest legitimate son of Qian Hongchu and Sun Taizhen, the dissolute crown prince of Wuyue, whose impulsive ambition makes him susceptible to Li Yuanqing's manipulation.
- Wang Shuo as Yuan Dezhao (元德昭), courtesy name Mingyuan(明遠), a sagacious and politically astute chancellor of Wuyue who serves three successive kings with unwavering integrity, notably refusing to bow during Hu Jinsi's coup until personally confirming Qian Hongchu's identity as the new king, thereby earning profound trust through his demonstration of "comporting oneself with dignity amid upheaval."
- Zhao Zheng as Shen Wenqi (慎溫其), courtesy name Ruyu(如玉), a principled scholar-official and loyal advisor who endures imprisonment and torture rather than betray his lord Qian Hongjun, ultimately earning recognition as a paragon of integrity and rising to become prefect of Wenzhou.
- Chen Zhihui as Dai Yun (戴惲), the militarily powerful Commander of the Inner Palace Cavalry and maternal uncle to Qian Hongyou, whose very capability and royal connections make him the target of a preemptive strike by the minister Hu Jinsi, resulting in his tragic execution on fabricated charges of treason.
- Wang Jialin as Shen Yin (沈寅), courtesy name Huzi(虎子), the principled and farsighted chancellor of Wuyue who serves as Qian Hongchu's trusted mentor and chief advisor for three decades, ultimately choosing loyalty to his sovereign over personal survival when the kingdom surrenders to the Song Dynasty.
- Tian Lei as Cui Renji (崔仁冀), courtesy name Ziqian(子遷), a prescient scholar-official who rises from Tongru Academy academician to chancellor and serves as the principal architect of Wuyue's peaceful surrender to the Song Dynasty, ultimately securing his legacy as a pragmatic statesman who prioritizes the survival of his people over dynastic independence.
- Mei Ting as Lady Yu (俞大娘子), mother of Qian Hongyou and Sun Taizhen, the formidable owner of Huanglong Island and merchant clan "Huanglong House".
- Zhao Jian as Cheng Zhaoyue (程昭悅), a cunning and ambitious merchant who rises from the leader of the Shanyue House to become the powerful Inner Palace Commissioner, ultimately meeting his downfall through execution for treason after attempting to seize the throne of Wuyue.
- Wang Zhipeng as He Chengxun (何承訓), a treacherous and opportunistic military officer who orchestrates multiple betrayals across three reigns—from burning the royal treasury to instigating coups—before being publicly executed by Qian Hongchu for his fickle loyalty and complicity in the massacre of the Shuiqiu family.

Central Plains

- Dong Yong as Feng Dao (馮道), courtesy name Kedao(可道), the remarkably resilient "unchanging minister" who serves eleven emperors across four dynasties while maintaining his commitment to preserving cultural continuity and alleviating civilian suffering amid the chaos of the Five Dynasties period.
- Ji Chenmu as Fan Zhi (范質), courtesy name Wensu(文素), a prodigiously talented scholar-official who serves as Hanlin Academician and Drafter of Proclamations during the Later Jin, ultimately becoming one of the most enduring statesmen of the Five Dynasties period by navigating four successive regimes with his literary brilliance and political acumen.
- Huang Chao as Sang Weihan (桑維翰), courtesy name Guoqiao(國僑), the brilliant but controversial Later Jin chancellor who engineered the cession of the Sixteen Prefectures to the Khitans, ultimately meeting his death with stoic dignity after delivering a haunting monologue on the immutable nature of right and wrong to the young Wuyue prince Qian Hongchu.
- Hao Ping as Zhao Hongyin (趙弘殷), a seasoned military commander who serves through four dynastic transitions and fathers the future Song Dynasty emperors, ultimately dying before witnessing his son Zhao Kuangyin's imperial ascension but posthumously honored as Emperor Xuanzu.
- Hai Yitian as Shi Jingtang (石敬瑭), a military governor of the Later Tang who, with the support of the Khitan, overthrew his former sovereign to establish the Later Jin as its first emperor, famously ceding the Sixteen Prefectures and accepting a subordinate "son emperor" status to the Khitan in exchange for military aid.
- Ren Youlun as Shi Chonggui (石重貴), the second and final emperor of the Later Jin dynasty, whose refusal to continue his predecessor's subservient relationship with the Khitan led to war, the collapse of his state, and his own capture and exile, marking the end of the short-lived regime.
- Jia Hongwei as Zhang Yanze (張彥澤), a general of Later Tang and Later Jin dynasties who, despite his record of brutal suppression and personal cruelty, was retained for his battlefield effectiveness until he betrayed his sovereign by opening the gates of the capital to the invading Khitan army.
- He Ziming as Yelü Deguang (耶律德光), the second emperor of Liao dynasty, who led the Khitan conquest of northern China, briefly proclaimed himself emperor of the Central Plains after destroying the Later Jin, but was forced to withdraw due to Han Chinese's resistance and died during the retreat, marking the limit of Khitan expansion into traditional Chinese heartland.
- Yu Yang as Liu Zhiyuan (劉知遠), a military governor of the Later Jin who, following the collapse of that dynasty to Khitan invasion, declared himself emperor and established the Later Han, briefly restoring native Chinese rule over the Central Plain before his sudden death just one year into his reign.
- Lin Shaoyang as Liu Chengxùn(劉承訓), courtesy name Dehui(德輝). The eldest son of Liu Zhiyuan and Prince of Wei. Excelling in both civil and military affairs, he was originally expected to inherit the throne, but died suddenly.
- Lin Junyi as Liu Chengyou(劉承祐), Liu Zhiyuan's second son, the second and final emperor of the Later Han dynasty, whose attempt to eliminate the powerful military governors who had supported his father's rise provoked a rebellion that overthrew his regime and ended the dynasty after only four years of rule.
- Feng Peng as Li Ye(李業), uncle of Liu Chengxùn and Liu Chengyou. Instigated Liu Chengyou to kill the important ministers Yang Bin, Shi Hongzhao, Wang Zhang, and all family members of Guo Wei, driving Guo Wei into rebellion. After being defeated in battle, he was killed by Guo Wei.
- Jiang Kai as Guo Wei(郭威), courtesy name Wenzhong(文仲), the founding emperor of the Later Zhou dynasty, a former military governor of the Later Han who rose in rebellion after Emperor Liu Chengyou murdered his entire family, then overthrew the young sovereign to seize the throne. He adopted his brother-in-law's son Chai Rong—later renamed Guo Rong—as his heir, ensuring the succession of one of the most capable emperors of the Five Dynasties period.
- Wei Qianxiang as Zhao Kuangyi/Zhao Guangyi (趙匡義/趙光義), courtesy name Tingyi(廷宜), the younger brother of Zhao Kuangyin (Emperor Taizu of Song), succeeded to the throne as Emperor Taizong of Song following his brother's death and accepted Qian Chu's surrender of Wuyue to the Song dynasty.
- Zhang Fan as Sima Pu (司馬浦), a middle-aged scholar who has failed the imperial examination for forty years before being discovered by the incognito Zhao Kuangyin in a tavern, subsequently appointed to the Privy Council for his vision of benevolent governance, and later memorializing the emperor to spare Wang Quanbin's life—establishing the precedent of not executing officials and ending the cycle of purges that doomed previous dynasties, thereby paving the way for the peaceful "Dismissing Generals with a Cup of Wine".

Southern Tang

- Zhan Chenglin as Li Jing (李璟), courtesy name Boyu(伯玉), the second king of Southern Tang whose ambitious military campaigns against Min and Chu bring his kingdom to its territorial zenith, only to see it precipitously decline through disastrous wars with Later Zhou that cost him the Huainan region and his imperial title, setting the stage for his poet-son Li Yu's tragic reign.
- Niu Chao as Li Yu (李煜), the last king of Southern Tang, a celebrated poet whose lyrical verses captured the melancholy of lost power and exile after his realm's conquest by the Song dynasty, earning him recognition as one of China's greatest literary figures despite his failures as a monarch.
- Zhao Zhengyang as Xu Xuan (徐铉), courtesy name Dingchen(鼎臣), the principled Southern Tang envoy who confronts Later Jin chancellor Sang Weihan when the latter threatens to expose the Southern Tang as the next target of Khitan aggression by replicating his betrayal of the Sixteen Prefectures unless the Southern Tang agrees to dispatch troops against the nomadic threat.
- Zhang Xiaochen as Li Yuanqing (李元清), courtesy name Yunqing(云清), the cunning and resilient spymaster of the Southern Tang's Qinhuai House who devises elaborate stratagems to resist Song's expansion, ultimately surviving the fall of his kingdom to live out his days in scholarly seclusion while co-compiling the Hundred Family Surnames.

== Episodes ==
List of Episodes
Episode	English title	Original title	Original release date
1	Enigma in Turmoil	乱世迷局	23 January 2026
Amid the chaos of the Five Dynasties, Zhao Kuangyin witnessed a miscarriage of justice that filled him with indignation. Meanwhile, the Wuyue royal treasury was robbed; Qian Hongchu disguised himself to investigate the case, became entangled in a conspiracy orchestrated by a Southern Tang merchants clan "Qinhuai House", and was ambushed and captured.
2	Fire Devours the Palace	火噬宫闱	23 January 2026
The Huanglong House's ship hijacking goes awry; Qian Hongchu is captured then rescued. The Wuyue royal treasury case is exposed, prompting the traitorous faction to set fire to destroy evidence. Qian Yuanguan dies of illness, and court power suddenly tightens.
3	The New King's Dilemma	新王困局	24 January 2026
Following Qian Yuanguan's death, Hu Jinsi purges dissenters—General Dai Yun is executed and Qian Hongyou imprisoned. Qian Hongchu allies with Huanglong Island to apply pressure, prompting the court to consider deposing Hongyou to resolve the crisis.
4	Crimson Covenant	血色投名	24 January 2026
Lady Yu orchestrates her schemes within Wuyue, while Qian Hongzuo intimidates the power-hungry ministers. In the Central Plains, Shi Jingtang dies of illness; Feng Dao switches allegiance to install Shi Chonggui. Zhao Kuangyin earns advancement by protecting the new emperor, yet suspicion and dread take root in his heart.
5	Turbulence to the North	北望惊澜	25 January 2026
Qian Hongzuo ascends the throne, stabilizing Wuyue. Defeat in the Central Plains breeds turmoil. Qian Hongchu travels north as part of a diplomatic mission, witnessing firsthand the ravages of war and the suffering of common folk. Along the way, he rescues Guo Rong—an act that plants the seeds of new storms yet to come.
6	The Youth's Heavenly Inquiry	少年天问	25 January 2026
Chaos engulfs Bianliang; the Zhao father and son quell the unrest and rescue the people. Feng Dao engineers Shi Chonggui's abdication. Qian Hongchu, Zhao Kuangyin and Guo Rong confront the dethroned emperor, bearing witness to the fickle hearts of men in turbulent times.
7	Fortify and Fight	守城备战	26 January 2026
As Zhang Yanze closes in, Feng Dao vows to defend Bianliang—marshaling troops, fortifying walls, and refusing surrender. Wuyue lends silver to aid in the defense; the city organizes and shelters refugees. Qian Hongchu clashes with Guo Rong over their conflicting ideals. The decisive battle looms.
8	The Price of Power	权术之价	26 January 2026
As the fierce battle for Bianliang looms, political maneuvering runs rampant within the walls and moral conflicts erupt repeatedly. Qian Hongchu undergoes a transformation of heart after his first taste of bloody combat, while Zhao Kuangyin secretly schemes a surprise attack—the tide of battle hangs by a thread.
9	Requiem on the City Gate	城头祭梦	27 January 2026
In the twilight of Later Jin, Zhao Kuangyin's night raid against the Khitan earns merit yet cannot turn the tide. The city's defense ends in crushing defeat; the court within opts for surrender. Sang Weihan defies orders unto death. Loyalty and treachery, merit and fault intertwine—the tragedy of chaotic times unfolds in full.
10	No Honor Among Men	道义何存	27 January 2026
Bianliang falls; the Khitan sack the city and massacre the people. The emperor performs the Rite of the Leashed Goat—a humiliation upon the Central Plains. Loyal ministers martyr themselves for honor; heroes find their strength spent against the tide. Zhao Kuangyin swallows his pride and bides his time. In the collapse of an age, the tragedy of human nature and the fate of nations unfolds in full.
11	Blade at Court	殿前刺奸	28 January 2026
Zhang Yanze's brutal murder of Lady Ding—consort of the fallen emperor—ignites popular fury. Feng Dao maneuvers to stabilize the situation, leveraging public sentiment to check the Khitan and preserve Qian Hongchu's life. All factions secretly plot their chance to turn against the Khitan and restore the Central Plains.
12	The Game of Hearts	人心博弈	28 January 2026
For assassinating Zhang Yanze at court, Qian Hongchu languishes in prison awaiting execution; Zhao Kuangyin appeals to Guo Wei to intervene and save his life. Liu Zhiyuan declares independence as Later Han from Hedong, while Feng Dao seizes the moment to pressure the Khitan into executing Zhang Yanze—consolidating the hearts of the Central Plains.
13	Returning	北归南渡	29 January 2026
The Khitan emperor dies suddenly during the northern retreat; Later Han army enters Bianliang. The Wuyue envoy moors at Ninghai en route, where Qian Hongchu disguises himself to observe the people's hardships. Obtaining a contract from Cui Renji, he uncovers the dark conspiracy of local officials and gentry—land seizure and murder—and resolves to investigate immediately.
14	Undercurrents at Ninghai	宁海暗流	29 January 2026
Qian Hongchu launches a thunderous raid on Ninghai, uncovering the Taizhou military colony corruption network implicating powerful court figures. The Wuyue court trembles; factions watch and wait as storms gather beneath the surface.
15	Trial by Fire	淬炼初程	29 January 2026
Following his punishment, Qian Hongchu joins the southern campaign in charge of military supply lines. As Wuyue aids Fuzhou against Southern Tang, the brothers set aside their differences to face the external threat together. Tested by fire in the crisis, Hongchu begins to show his capacity for leadership.
16	The Forging of an Army	整军砺志	30 January 2026
Qian Hongchu reorganizes the Zhongshun Guard, winning hearts through a blend of benevolence and authority. He harshly punishes military injustices to secure the supply lines. When heavy rains cut off provisions, he divides his forces to adapt, personally securing funds and supplies to resolve the crisis.
17	The Wenzhou Cleansing	温州肃贪	30 January 2026
Cui Renji is framed; Qian Hongchu feigns belief while investigating in secret. Subsequently, Cui Renji launches a night raid on the Shanyue House, seizing the embezzled grain. Qian Hongchu immediately enforces military law, executing the corrupt officials.
18	Dark Ambitions Rising	野心暗涌	30 January 2026
Qian Hongchu reorganizes the army and stabilizes Min, while Shen Wenqi serves as regent and policy advisor; Wuyue captures Fuzhou. The court weighs rewards and titles, even as Cheng Zhaoyue conspires with the enemy and plots rebellion, secretly scheming to carve out his own domain.
19	The Xiaoshan Raid	萧山夺营	1 February 2026
The aftermath of the Taizhou case remains unsettled; Cheng Zhaoyue's collusion with the enemy comes to light, while Hu Jinsi emerges as the gravest threat. Qian Hongchu lays a trap to test loyalty, only to realize his miscalculation. He rushes to Xiaoshan to seize military command and secure Hangzhou.
20	Shadows Untie	危局暗解	2 February 2026
Hu Jinsi hosts a night banquet for Shuiqiu Zhaoquan, using chicken leg wordplay to signal he has no rebellious intent—while actually demanding military authority. Qian Hongchu establishes authority through corporal punishment, then relents to win Shen Chengli's loyalty. Qian Hongzuo appoints Hu as Grand Marshal; ruler and minister reconcile their differences. Cheng Zhaoyue falls from power; Li Yuanqing is detained; Qian Hongzong sends He Chengxun to arrest Cheng.
21	Besieged Within and Without	内外交困	2 February 2026
Guo Rong receives Qian Hongchu's letter, stating that military mobilization requires massive funds and grain—yet summer and autumn floods have devastated the Wuyue heartland, and famine relief has emptied the treasury. Qian Hongzuo falls gravely ill, recalling that the Wuyong Guard mutiny stemmed from withheld provisions; he knows cutting military supplies means digging his own grave. Qian Hongchu requests an audience, warning that Taizhou simmers with unrest and delayed spring planting will spark rebellion. Qian Hongzuo is overcome with conflicting emotions—besieged by disasters both within and without.
22	Grain from Huanglong	黄龙借粮	2 February 2026
Around Qian Hongchu's appointment to Taizhou, multiple factions maneuver in the shadows: grain loans are obstructed, surveillance tightens, and tributary pressure mounts. Corruption surfaces in Taizhou's officialdom; the grain tax crisis remains unresolved—as the situation grows increasingly complex.
23	Outwitting the Huanglong	智取黄龙	3 February 2026
Sun Taizhen steals the Huanglong token to exchange for grain, resolving the Taizhou crisis. In Bianliang, river engineering projects are decided while undercurrents swirl around the succession. Qian Hongchu hosts a banquet to force the grain issue; Taizhou's powerful clans see through his gambit and respond in kind—as the standoff between officials and gentry gradually comes to light.
24	The Harbor Cleansing	港城肃贪	3 February 2026
Ge Qiang defects to reveal the powerful clans' secrets. Qian Hongchu uses the Lantern Festival assembly to swiftly purge corrupt officials and gentry, establishing the Exchange Office to benefit the people. Wei Lun and Ge Yanping are executed; Sun Taizhen returns with grain—and the Taizhou situation stabilizes.
25	Benevolence and Authority	恩威并施	3 February 2026
At the Lantern Festival assembly, Qian Hongchu employs "interest conversion" to appease the powerful clans—transforming the illegal into the legal, resolving both livelihood and commerce in one stroke. Meanwhile in Hangzhou, the dying Qian Hongzuo arranges a balance of power, summoning Qian Hongchu back to the capital to assist in governance.
26	Undercurrents at the Wedding	婚典暗潮	4 February 2026
Qian Hongzong's succession carries hidden risks; Qian Hongchu, his mission accomplished, now enters the power struggle. In the Central Plains, the Prince of Wei dies suddenly—Liu Chengyou is installed as crown prince, and the court trembles. In Taizhou, Qian Hongchu weds; the Huanglong fleet sails as his bride's escort.
27	New Throne, Old Grudges	新君旧衅	4 February 2026
Grieving and guilt-stricken upon hearing of his brother's death, Qian Hongchu returns to Hangzhou only to be plunged into power struggles. Qian Hongzong forcibly grants military authority, suspecting Hu Jinsi; He Chengxun seizes the moment to sow slander—as the court grows ever more chaotic.
28	Ambush at the Lantern Festival	上元伏杀	4 February 2026
The assassination attempt at the Lantern Festival palace banquet fails; Shuiqiu intervenes in time to stop the hidden ambush in the side hall. He Chengxun again manipulates Qian Hongzong, only to provoke Hu Jinsi into preemptive action—forcing the palace, imprisoning the ruler, and stripping him of his regent position.
29	Palace Coup	逼宫立主	5 February 2026
Hu Jinsi coerces Qian Hongchu into the palace to ascend the throne. Qian Hongzong's plea for help fails, and he abandons his attendants; Shuiqiu Zhaoquan and his entire household are exterminated. To preserve the realm, protect the people, and spare his brother's life, Qian Hongchu reluctantly accepts the regency.
30	Lesson of the Cornerstone	柱石之鉴	5 February 2026
Qian Hongchu ascends the throne; He Chengxun presents the severed head of Shuiqiu, and Qian Hongchu executes He Chengxun on the spot in fury. He finally comprehends that the ways of the world breed calamity; swallowing his personal vengeance, he honors Hu Jinsi as "Pillar of the State" to stabilize Wuyue.
31	Undercurrents in the Temple Hall	庙堂暗流	5 February 2026
Liu Zhiyuan dies; the Later Han faces suspicion with a young ruler, Liu Chengyou. Guo Wei quells rebellion and earns merit, only to be met with suspicion. In Wuyue, Qian Hongchu stabilizes the court and implements the tax-farming system — while undercurrents surge in the Central Plains.
32	The Ye Mutiny	邺都兵变	6 February 2026
Yang Bin and other senior ministers are ambushed and executed en route to the palace. Guo Wei and Guo Rong's entire families are massacred—prompting them to raise troops to "purge the emperor's court", enter Bianliang, kill Li Ye, and bring about Liu Chengyou's death. The multitude petitions Guo Wei to claim the throne; instead, he proposes Liu Yun, stunning the court. His generals, led by Wang Jun, are deeply displeased, believing Guo Wei should seize the moment and declare himself emperor.
33	New Throne, New Laws	新朝立规	6 February 2026
Generals led by Wang Jun submit a joint petition urging Guo Wei to advance; left with no choice, Guo Wei accepts the "yellow robe" and ascends the throne—but only after extracting three solemn promises. He establishes the state as "Zhou(Later Zhou)", and insists on naming his adopted son Guo Rong as crown prince. Wang Jun opposes this in open court; Guo Rong himself requests assignment to Chanzhou to tame the Yellow River, unwilling to occupy the Eastern Chamber. After quelling the rebellion, Guo Wei personally journeys to the Confucius Temple at Qufu, championing governance through Confucianism.
34	The Feudal Purge	削藩风云	7 February 2026
Guo Rong resolves to implement the policy of pruning the feudatories; Guo Wei lays the groundwork at a night banquet, sending the overbearing Wang Jun to provincial assignment. Feng Dao advises that weakening regional power requires cunning; Later Zhou dispatches envoys to cease warfare through trade. In Wuyue, Qian Hongchu cuts troops and reorganizes—facing fierce opposition from the military faction led by Hu Jinsi.
35	Two Courts, Two Fates	南北殊途	7 February 2026
The Zhou envoy witnesses Southern Tang's royal extravagance against Wuyue's popular stability, bearing witness to Qian Hongchu's conviction that "the people are the foundation of the state". Guo Wei dies; Guo Rong succeeds and overrides all objections to personally campaign against Northern Han. The Wuyue king also dispatches troops north of the river in coordination—as the Five Dynasties era faces monumental change.
36	The Gaoping Tempering	高平砺兵	7 February 2026
Guo Rong personally leads the Gaoping campaign, crushing the Northern Han-Khitan allied forces. Post-battle, he overrides objections to cut redundant troops and establish the Palace Front Command—promoting Zhao Kuangyin to whip the new troop into shape, laying crucial groundwork for Later Zhou's military strength. Feng Dao receives news of the victory and passes away in peace.
37	Ceasing Spears, Seeking Peace	止戈和议	8 February 2026
Later Zhou and Southern Tang reach the Shouzhou armistice. Guo Rong and Qian Hongchu meet again in Bianliang—two men of honor who cherish each other yet hold back due to the times. Zhao Kuangyin harbors quiet regret at preserving Southern Tang, revealing his diverging vision from Guo Rong on the path to unification. On his deathbed, the powerful minister Hu Jinsi counsels that Guo Rong is an emperor of bold ambition, urging Qian Hongchu to safeguard Wuyue's foundation to meet whatever changes the future holds.
38	The Unfinished Will	世宗遗志	8 February 2026
Guo Rong's northern expedition against Liao sweeps all before it—yet he turns his army back for the people's peace. Soon after, he falls gravely ill. On his deathbed, he entrusts his son to Zhao Kuangyin, hands him the great banner and high office, bequeathing his unfulfilled ambition to unify the realm. In 959 CE, Emperor Shizong of Later Zhou, Guo Rong, passes away—his great cause undone.
39	The Chenqiao Accession	陈桥立宋	9 February 2026
Zhao Kuangyin stages the Chenqiao mutiny, receives the yellow robe, and founds Song dynasty with three solemn promises. Qian Chu (having changed his name to avoid the taboo of Zhao Hongyin) observes before offering submission. Li Chongjin's rebellion is crushed; Wang Quanbin's indiscriminate slaughter in the conquest of Later Shu draws condemnation. Song establishes policies to prune the feudatories and reform the imperial examinations.
40	New Policies in the Temple Hall	庙堂新策	9 February 2026
Zhao Kuangyin seeks worthy men and establishes the special examination quota, demonstrating benevolent governance. Wuyue takes in displaced refugees under the guise of famine relief. Sima Pu forcefully advocates for centralizing wealth, pruning the feudatories, and rectifying court conduct—refusing high office to speak frankly, piercing to the root of the age's chaos.
41	Martyred Warning	死谏释兵	9 February 2026
A loyal minister remonstrates unto death, forcefully declaring the ruinous cost of endless warfare. The emperor awakens, issuing an edict to cease military campaigns and rest the realm—temporary peace settles across court and countryside, yet undercurrents of power struggle continue to surge.
42	Planning the Conquest South	南征定策	10 February 2026
The Song court finalizes the grand strategy for the southern conquest; generals receive their assignments, grain and troops are mobilized and ready. Swords point toward Jiangnan—the momentum for unification takes shape.
43	Troops at the River's Edge	兵临江表	11 February 2026
The Song army presses to the northern bank of the Yangtze, deploying defenses along the river and building warships. Jiangnan trembles; attack and defense hang by a thread.
44	Mist over the Jiangnan Shore	江表疑云	12 February 2026
Crown Prince Qian Weijun, deceived by Li Yuanqing, rashly uses the royal seal—triggering military conflict at Jiangnan shore and abruptly tightening relations between Wuyue and Song. To quell the crisis, Qian Chu severely punishes the crown prince and pursues Li Yuanqing's whereabouts. Undercurrents surge through Jiangnan as internal and external crises mount for Wuyue.
45	Twilight of the Southern Capital	金陵落日	12 February 2026
Southern Tang falls; Qian Chu avoids suspicion by not entering Jiangning, harshly punishing his troops for disturbing the populace and severing Ding Deyu's ear as warning. Upon returning home, the Song court weighs the situation—Zhao Kuangyin refrains from immediate military action, instead summoning Qian Chu to the capital for an audience.
46	The Perilous Audience	危局赴京	12 February 2026
With Southern Tang's fall, Li Yuanqing leads his remaining forces in a desperate last stand before retreating. Wuyue finds itself in peril—when the lips are gone, the teeth grow cold. Summoned by Zhao Kuangyin, Qian Chu rides for Bianliang, knowing full well this is a "Hongmen Banquet" where life and death hang in the balance. Before departing, he entrusts the affairs of Wuyue to his heirs.
47	The Bianliang Enigma	汴梁风云	13 February 2026
Qian Chu arrives in Bianliang to generous treatment from Zhao Kuangyin; the two men lay old burdens to rest. Then Zhao Kuangyin dies on a snowy night—the "Axe Sounds in Candlelight" plays out, and Zhao Guangyi succeeds. Qian Chu's wife Sun Taizhen passes away; he is left caught between impossible choices.
48	The Great Submission	纳土归宋	13 February 2026
True to his ancestors' precepts, Qian Chu kneels in the ancestral hall, then announces the surrender of Wuyue—offering its thirteen prefectures to Song to spare Jiangnan the flames of war. The age of chaos ends in unification; the peaceful year arrives at last.

== Production ==
=== Development ===
The series was conceived over a decade by Huace Film & TV, with five years dedicated to script development. The production was supported by the 2024 Cultural Industry Development Special Fund of the Publicity Department of the Chinese Communist Party and designated as a major historical drama by the National Radio and Television Administration. The series represents a rare television portrayal of the Five Dynasties and Ten Kingdoms period, a relatively underrepresented era in Chinese historical dramas. The production team emphasized the contemporary relevance of the "peaceful unification" theme, drawing parallels to modern international relations while maintaining historical accuracy.

=== Casting ===
To immerse himself in the role, Bai Yu has been studying the history of the Five Dynasties and Ten Kingdoms period for months before filming, rarely leaving his home to focus entirely on script analysis; designed nuanced characterizations for each stage of Qian Hongchu's life, from youthful naivety to mature kingship, demonstrating precise control over the 50-year age span of the role.

Zhu Yawen stationed himself at the National Museum of Classic Books for six months before filming, meticulously reading the History of Song, Old History of the Five Dynasties, and Xu Zizhi Tongjian Changbian; consulted two historians professional in Song Dynasty history in Kaifeng and Luoyang, repeatedly refining Zhao Kuangyin's vocal transitions from sharp to restrained and his physical bearing from aggressive to profound; performed all dangerous stunts without safety doubles, including enduring real whip strikes and 47-minute continuous filming in industrial-grade sandstorms.

=== Filming ===
Principal photography began on September 28, 2024, at Hengdian World Studios in Zhejiang Province. Filming locations spanned multiple sites across Zhejiang and Gansu provinces, including:

- Hengdian World Studios (primary location)
- Dunhuang, Gansu
- Shaoxing, Zhejiang
- Taizhou, Zhejiang
- Hangzhou (West Lake, Lin'an District, Binjiang District)
- Wenzhou (Cangnan County), Zhejiang
- Quzhou, Zhejiang

The production utilized the Qian Wang Temple (錢王祠) in Lin'an (modern Hangzhou), the ancestral home of the Wuyue royal family, as an authentic filming location.

=== Technical specifications ===
The series was shot in 8K Ultra High Definition using RED 8K cameras and Zeiss Supreme Prime (SP) lenses, representing a technical milestone for Chinese television production. The production team constructed over 550 sets totaling 38,000 square meters and created more than 8,000 costumes. Costume details included the recreation of Tang dynasty "plant dyeing" techniques, and lead actors' wigs were hand-woven with 120 needles per square centimeter. Audio-visual technology followed the National Radio and Television Administration's 2024 standards, employing domestic HDR Vivid and Audio Vivid technologies for enhanced viewing experience.

== Reception ==
=== Public response ===
The series received generally positive reviews for its historical accuracy, production values, and performances. Critics praised the drama's nuanced portrayal of a complex historical period and its emphasis on peaceful unification over military conquest.It also sparked widespread public interest in the historical era it depicts, prompting renewed discussions among viewers and scholars about the political choices and cultural legacy of that period.

Professor Yin Hong, Vice Chairman of the China Film Association and professor at Tsinghua University, commented: "The series is not merely a story of dynastic transition, but a narrative that highlights the themes of unification and peace. Qian Hongchu's choice represents a historic decision that prioritized the welfare of the people over personal power".

Beyond its artistic reception, the drama also prompted cross-regional media discussion in Hong Kong and Taiwan. Some commentators interpreted the depiction of Qian Hongchu's peaceful submission to the Song dynasty as carrying contemporary resonance for Cross-strait relations. Media reports noted debate over whether the series' portrayal of "peaceful unification" could be understood as a modern political allegory. Such interpretations were presented as commentary rather than as an explicitly stated intention of the production team, reflecting broader sensitivities surrounding themes of unity and sovereignty in the region.

The 8K cinematography and detailed production design were particularly noted, with reviewers highlighting the visual clarity that captured minute details such as blood droplets and fabric textures. The ensemble cast, combining rising stars like Bai Yu and Zhou Yutong with veteran actors including Ni Dahong and Dong Yong, was praised for bringing depth to the historical figures.

=== Ratings ===
China CCTV-1 Prime Time
Episodes	Broadcast date	Ratings (%)	Audience share (%)
1-2	January 23, 2026	1.2809	7.307
3-4	January 24, 2026	1.2804	7.1145
5-6	January 25, 2026	1.2154	7.1981
7-8	January 26, 2026	1.2864	7.6565
9-10	January 27, 2026	1.3009	7.9757
11-12	January 28, 2026	1.346	8.336
13-15	January 29, 2026	1.653	8.7398
16-18	January 30, 2026	1.7141	9.0901
19	February 1, 2026	—N/a	—N/a
20-22	February 2, 2026	1.7053	9.1013
23-25	February 3, 2026	1.7419	9.3782
26-28	February 4, 2026	1.7444	9.2926
29-31	February 5, 2026	1.8272	9.6573
32-33	February 6, 2026	2.119	10.0889
34-36	February 7, 2026	1.7982	9.0614
37-38	February 8, 2026	1.7712	8.292
39-41	February 9, 2026	1.9717	10.5861
42	February 10, 2026	0.8768	12.3902
43	February 11, 2026	0.7806	10.9872
44-46	February 12, 2026	1.8754	10.3598
47-48	February 13, 2026	1.9953	11.0161

- Highest ratings are marked in red, lowest ratings are marked in blue
