= Yuan Dezhao =

Yuan Dezhao (元德昭) (891-April 2, 968), probably né Wei Dezhao (危德昭), courtesy name Mingyuan (名遠), was an official of the Chinese Five Dynasties and Ten Kingdoms Period state Wuyue, serving as a chancellor during the rule of Qian Hongzong (King Zhongxun) and Qian Chu (King Zhongyi, né Qian Hongchu).

== Background ==
Yuan Dezhao was born in 891, during the reign of Emperor Zhaozong of Tang, probably under the name of Wei Dezhao. While he was described to be "from Nancheng (南城), in Fǔ Prefecture (撫州, in modern Fuzhou, Jiangxi)," he was actually probably born at Xin Prefecture (信州, in modern Shangrao, Jiangxi) — because his uncle Wei Quanfeng, who then controlled Fǔ Prefecture, had sent Wei Dezhao's father Wei Zaichang (危仔倡) to take over Xin in or around 882. While at Xin, Wei Zaichang had once called out his sons to be viewed by a fortuneteller so that the fortuneteller could tell their fates. When the fortuneteller saw Wei Dezhao, he stated to Wei Zaichang, "Of your sons, only this one is not going to serve in the military." Later, when he began to study, his teachers several times, after marveling at his talent, left their seats and stated, "You, son, have the ability to be a chancellor. You should take good care of yourself."

In 909, by which time Tang dynasty had fallen, Wei Quanfeng tried to take over the rest of Zhennan Circuit (鎮南, headquartered in modern Nanchang, Jiangxi), mostly possessed by one of Tang's successor states Hongnong at that point. He was defeated and captured by the Hongnong general Zhou Ben, and his Fǔ Prefecture was taken over by Hongnong. Wei Zaichang initially submitted to Hongnong's prince Yang Longyan, but when Hongnong forces then approached Xin, Wei Zaichang decided to flee to Hongnong's southeastern neighbor Wuyue. Wuyue's prince Qian Liu gave Wei Zaichang the title of deputy military governor of Huainan Circuit (淮南, headquartered in modern Yangzhou, Jiangsu) — an honorary title, because at that time Huainan was under Hongnong's control (and was, in fact, Hongnong's main circuit). He changed Wei Zaichang's surname from Wei to Yuan — as he disliked "Wei" (i.e., "danger").

It is not known when Yuan Dezhao entered governmental service, but it was said that he started as a surveyor for Qian Liu under Qian's role as the military governor (Jiedushi) of Zhendong Circuit (鎮東, headquartered in modern Shaoxing, Zhejiang), as well as the magistrate of Qiantang County (錢塘, in modern Hangzhou, Zhejiang), the county housing the Wuyue capital. He later successively served as the military assistant to the prefect of Mu Prefecture (睦州, in modern Hangzhou); acting prefect of Tai Prefecture (台州, in modern Taizhou, Zhejiang); and the commander of Xinting Base (新亭).

== During Qian Yuanguan's and Qian Hongzuo's rules ==
After Qian Liu's son and successor Qian Yuanguan (King Wenmu) succeeded Qian Liu in 932, he found it difficult to find people to draft his orders for him. His assistant Lin Ding recommended Yuan Dezhao to him. After Qian Yuanguan had a lengthy conversation with Yuan Dezhao, he told Lin, "Yuan Dezhao has the ability to serve as a guide of the state. My descendants will not need to worry." He then put Yuan in charge of drafting his orders. It is not clear whether Yuan continued those responsibilities after Qian Yuanguan died in 941 and was succeeded by his son Qian Hongzuo (King Wenxian).

In 946, when Li Da, the former Min general then occupying Min's capital Fú Prefecture (福州, in modern Fuzhou, Jiangsu, note different tone than Yuan's ancestral prefecture) was being attacked by Southern Tang forces, sought aid from Qian Hongzuo, Qian Hongzuo decided to send an army to aid Li Da. He put Cheng Zhaoyue (程昭悅) in charge of army supplies, while putting Yuan in charge of military strategies.

== During Qian Hongzong's rule ==
After Qian Hongzuo died in 947 and was succeeded by his brother Qian Hongzong (King Zhongxun), Qian Hongzong continued to entrust Yuan Dezhao with the military matters in campaigns involving the former Min territory. He soon thereafter made Yuan chancellor.

Around the new year 948, Qian Hongzong considered killing the powerful guard general Hu Jinsi, but could not resolve to do so immediately. When the news leaked to Hu, Hu put Qian Hongzong under house arrest and forced him to pass the throne to his younger brother Qian Hongchu, under the guise that Qian Hongzong had suffered a stroke and could no longer attend to the affairs of the state. Before the order could be issued, Hu, in Qian Hongzong's name, summoned Qian Hongchu and Yuan. When Yuan arrived at the palace, he looked at the screen outside the hall and could determine that both Qian Hongchu and Hu were inside, so he refused to bow (effectively, to Hu), stating, "I need to see the new lord." Only after Hu exited from the screen (leaving Qian Hongchu inside alone) did Yuan bow to him. Thereafter, Qian Hongchu, after extracting an assurance from Hu that Hu would not try to kill Qian Hongzong, took the throne.

== During Qian Chu's rule ==
Qian Hongchu continued to treat Yuan Dezhao with great respect, and Yuan remained chancellor. As chancellor, he was said to be kind, serious, and full of strategies. He was also said to be decisive, and whenever there were disputes between other officials on policy decisions, his arrival would allow decisions to be reached. He favored drinking, but it was said that while he was frequently drunk, he did not fail to carry out his duties.

In 956, when Southern Tang's northern neighbor Later Zhou, to which Wuyue was a vassal, launched a major attack on Southern Tang, Qian Hongchu launched his army and stationed it on the border with Southern Tang, waiting for orders from the Later Zhou emperor Guo Rong on whether to attack Southern Tang. The army officer Chen Man (陳滿) argued to Yuan's chancellor colleague Wu Cheng that Southern Tang was in shock over the Later Zhou invasion and that its important city Chang Prefecture (常州, in modern Changzhou, Jiangsu) would be defenseless and could easily be taken; subsequently, Chen falsely informed Wu that the Later Zhou emperor had already ordered Wuyue to attack. Wu advocated to Qian that Wuyue launch an attack. Yuan opposed, however, stating to Qian Hongchu: "Tang is a large state, and we cannot take it lightly. If we enter Tang territory and Zhou forces do not arrive, we would be with no other allies, and we would be in danger. Please wait." Qian Hongchu, however, ultimately listened to Wu, and put him in charge of the operations, with the generals Bao Xiurang (鮑脩讓) and Luo Sheng (羅晟) serving under Wu. Wu told the soldiers, "Chancellor Yuan does not want to launch the attack." The soldiers became angry and tried to attack Yuan. Qian Hongchu hid Yuan in his palace and ordered that those advocating assaulting Yuan be arrested, while sighing, "Just as the army is launched, the soldiers want to attack the chancellor. This is a sign of misfortune."

Wu's attack on Chang was initially successful, as the outer city fell. The Southern Tang military prefect of Chang, Zhao Renze (趙仁澤), was captured by Wuyue forces and delivered to Qiantang. When brought to Qian Hongchu, Zhao refused to bow to him and rebuked him for breaking the peace between Wuyue and Southern Tang. In anger, Qian had his face lacerated severely, from mouth to ear. Yuan pitied Zhao for his faithfulness, and obtained the best medicine for him to save him. Subsequently, the Southern Tang general Chai Kehong (柴克宏) defeated Wu, who was forced to flee back to Wuyue territory, and Qian relieved Wu of his offices. In 959, after the end of the war between Later Zhou and Southern Tang, Wu Yanfu (吳延福) and he were sent on a mission to pay homage to Guo Rong, and it was said that he acted appropriately during the mission.

In Yuan's late years, he appeared weary and tired. When Qian Hongchu saw Yuan, he quietly spoke and wept to his attendants, "Yuan Dezhao's expressions looked weak and tired. If the unspeakable happened to him, who can assist me?" When Yuan subsequently fell ill, he made preparations for his own burial and tomb inscriptions. He died in 968, and was given posthumous honors, including the posthumous name Wenzhen (文貞, "civil and honest").

== Notes and references ==
- Spring and Autumn Annals of the Ten Kingdoms, vol. 87.
- Zizhi Tongjian, vols. 285, 287, 292, 293.
