= Ch'u-chou =

Ch'u-chou may refer to:

- Chuzhou, or Ch'u-chou in Wade–Giles, a city in Anhui, China
  - Chuzhou (disambiguation)
- Quzhou, or Ch'ü-chou in Wade–Giles, a city in Zhejiang, China
  - Quzhou (disambiguation)

== See also ==
- Zhuzhou, or Chu-chou in Wade–Giles, a city in Hunan, China
  - Zhuzhou (disambiguation)
