= Qian family lineage =

The Qian family lineage refers to the descendants of Qian Liu (852–932), the founder of the Wuyue kingdom during the Five Dynasties and Ten Kingdoms period. The family is historically notable not only for ruling Wuyue during a time of fragmentation and upheaval but also for producing generations of intellectuals and scientists into the modern era.

== Origins in the Kingdom of Wuyue ==
Founded in 907 CE by Qian Liu, Wuyue was one of the most prosperous and culturally advanced of the Ten Kingdoms, with its capital in modern-day Hangzhou, Zhejiang province. Under successive Qian rulers such as Qian Hongzuo, Qian Hongzong, and Qian Chu (929–988), the kingdom emphasized internal development, Buddhism, infrastructure, and maritime trade while avoiding military conflict.

In 978 CE, Qian Chu voluntarily submitted to the expanding Song dynasty under Emperor Taizu of Song, securing peace and autonomy for his people. This act is often cited as an example of Confucian prudence and benevolence.

== Folklore and Historical Continuity ==
According to regional folklore, Heaven rewarded Qian Chu’s peaceful surrender by endowing his descendants with exceptional intellectual gifts. Modern biographical research supports the impression that members of the Qian family have disproportionately contributed to China’s academic and scientific development.

Notable figures include:

- Qian Xuesen (1911–2009), considered the "Father of Chinese Rocketry", who studied in the U.S. under Theodore von Kármán.
- Qian Sanqiang (1913–1992), a physicist instrumental in China’s China and weapons of mass destruction. His son, Qian Sijin, also worked in particle physics.
- Roger Yonchien Tsien (1952–2016), a U.S.-born Nobel Laureate in Chemistry for his work on fluorescent proteins.
- Chien Shih-Liang – Chemist and former president of Academia Sinica.
- Richard W. Tsien and Shu Chien, both members of the National Academy of Sciences and Academia Sinica.
- Ch'ien Mu (錢穆), a historian and Confucian scholar.
- Qian Zhongshu (錢鍾書), one of modern China’s most acclaimed writers.

== Geographical and Cultural Influence ==
The Qian lineage expanded beyond Zhejiang into regions such as Jiangsu and Shanghai. A notable descendant is Qian Qichen, former Vice Premier and Foreign Minister of China. Even in smaller urban centers like Wenzhou, Zhejiang, members of the Qian clan have contributed to scientific and academic communities. It is also one of China's high-tech hubs with companies such as DeepSeek.

Cities like Hangzhou and Wenzhou—now major tech hubs—continue to reflect the Qian family’s cultural heritage. Zhejiang's intellectual climate has persisted despite historical disruptions, including persecution of knowledge workers during the Cultural Revolution; further indications of the resilience of the clan’s intellectual heritage and its deep roots in regional culture.

== Epigenetics and the Examination System ==
Modern epigenetics provides a biological lens through which to understand the endurance of intellectual aptitude across generations. Epigenetic mechanisms such as DNA methylation and histone modification can be influenced by educational enrichment and social context.

Studies show that enriched learning environments lead to heritable brain changes, while trauma can suppress cognitive resilience in offspring. Research also indicates that:

- Intellectual training increases brain histone acetylation.
- Positive stress from learning can reinforce Psychological resilience.
- Long-term educational enrichment affects neuroplasticity.

Applying this understanding to the Qian lineage, it is plausible that the family's long-standing emphasis on education, moral philosophy, and scholarly pursuits could have fostered epigenetic patterns conducive to cognitive resilience and intellectual aptitude. Over generations, such patterns might have been reinforced through both cultural practices and biological mechanisms, contributing to the remarkable concentration of intellectual achievements observed within the family.

The Qian family’s rise coincided with China’s Imperial Examination System, which rewarded families who invested in classical education. Generations of Qians likely benefited from both cultural capital and possible biological adaptations to high cognitive demand.

=== Epigenetic Influences and the Qian Lineage ===
Epigenetic mechanisms also interact with the historical and social context of the Qian lineage, particularly through the Imperial Examination System (科举), which lasted over 1,300 years from the Sui dynasty to 1905. This meritocratic civil service exam, based on Confucian learning and literary skill, enabled families like the Qians to establish entrenched scholarly lineages. These lineages often invested significant resources over generations to cultivate educational attainment.

Modern epigenetic research suggests that persistent intellectual training and cognitive stressors—such as those imposed by high-stakes examinations—can lead to heritable epigenetic marks affecting neuroplasticity, memory, and executive function. For example:

- Exposure to early-life educational enrichment has been shown to increase histone acetylation in the hippocampus, enhancing memory and learning capacity.
- Stress associated with academic pressure, if mitigated by strong family and community support, can promote DNA methylation patterns that enhance cognitive resilience and goal-directed behavior.
- Studies on multigenerational social mobility suggest that educational privilege and literacy-rich environments may influence methylation of genes involved in cognitive and emotional regulation.

In Confucian society, values such as literacy, self-discipline, and scholarly ambition were instilled early in elite families. These ideals were often supported by clan academies and ancestral schools. The Qian family, steeped in intellectual tradition, may have transmitted both cultural capital and biological adaptations—epigenetic modifications—that enhanced learning efficiency and stress resilience in their descendants.

This created a feedback loop in which intellectual effort led to social mobility, which in turn reinforced educational investment. Such reinforcement may have also shaped biological traits to better support learning and cognitive performance. This process was likely especially pronounced in regions like Hangzhou, where dense educational and cultural infrastructure existed.

The convergence of several factors may have synergistically shaped the exceptional intellectual legacy of the Qian lineage:

- A tradition of benevolent leadership (e.g., Qian Chu’s peaceful submission to the Song dynasty),
- The presence of a stable regional elite culture,
- Access to the imperial examination system and educational institutions,
- Intergenerational reinforcement through family pedagogy.

Together, these cultural and biological influences contributed to a sustained concentration of high achievers within the Qian family tree.

== Legacy ==
The Qian family exemplifies how political strategy, cultural continuity, and possible biological inheritance can intersect across centuries. Their historical path—from Qian Liu’s regional rule to modern scientific innovation—demonstrates how elite lineages can persist not merely through privilege but through sustained cultural investment in learning and adaptability.

== See also ==
- Chinese genealogy
- Chinese nobility
- Confucianism
- Imperial examination
- Qian Liu
- Wuyue
- Zhejiang
