= Later Zhou conquest of Huainan =

Conflict during the Five Dynasties and Ten Kingdoms period of China

The Later Zhou conquest of Huainan was a conflict during the Five Dynasties and Ten Kingdoms period of China. Huainan was the territories south of the Huai River and north of the Yangtze then controlled by the Southern Tang. In 956, Chai Rong (Emperor Shizong of Later Zhou) ordered an invasion of the region. The defending Southern Tang forces were consistently crushed as their military leadership was inept. However the advancing Later Zhou forces were imperiled by the staunch resistance of Shouzhou which threatened to cut supply lines. Initial Southern Tang peace offerings were spurned by Chai Rong and the conflict continued until spring 958. The defeated Southern Tang ceded Huainan and became a vassal of the Later Zhou.

== Background ==
After the collapse of the Tang dynasty in 907 China entered the Five Dynasties and Ten Kingdoms period. Multiple regimes vied for control of Northern China while various states existed in Southern China. The Later Han were overthrown in 951 by the Later Zhou but retained control of Taiyuan with the support of the Liao dynasty. Ascending the Later Zhou throne in 954, Emperor Chai Rong began several military campaigns with the intention of seizing territories from neighboring regimes. An invasion was imminent from the rump Later Han forces, known by prosperity as the Northern Han, with support from their Liao patrons. He defeated them in the Battle of Gaoping on 24 April 954 and pressed an attack on Taiyuan but had to withdraw shortly afterwards. In 955 Chai Rong launched an invasion of the Later Shu and successfully seized the prefectures of Chengzhou, Fengzhou, Jiezhou, and Qinzhou. Peace was concluded in December 955 which freed the emperor to consider other targets.

Wang Pu had previously composed a plan for the reunification of China and sent memorial was sent to the Emperor Chai Rong in spring 955. In it he argued that the lengthy Southern Tang border along the Huai River made them an ideal candidate to attack as it would be too difficult to defend. The plan was approved despite protest from other advisors. Peter Lorge suggested Chai Rong had only vague aspirations of territorial expansion, without the expectation of totally destroying the Southern Tang. Dredging operations were ordered to create a canal connecting the Bian and Si Rivers. Once completed Later Zhou armies could be transported rapidly to strike against the Southern Tang. During the winter the Huai River usually became shallow enough to traverse by foot. Southern Tang commanders annually posted troops along the northern bank to protect against possible invasion. This practice was kept up until 955, when Wu Tingshao (吳庭紹), suggested that this procedure be cancelled to save expenses. He erroneously believed war with the Later Zhou was unlikely. Defensive operations on the northern bank of the Huai ceased, leaving the Southern Tang unprepared for the coming attack.

== Invasion ==
In December 955 Li Gu was appointed to lead the Later Zhou armies in the coming attack against the Southern Tang. Wang Yanchao (王彥超) served as his deputy. The conflict would become the largest fought by the Later Zhou and began without a formal declaration of war. A pontoon bridge was constructed at Zhengyang and after its completion Later Zhou armies crossed the Huai. Li Gu advanced to Shangyao and defeated a Southern Tang army there. Once the invasion was learned the Southern Tang began mobilizing their armies. Liu Yanzhen (劉彥貞) was given command of 20,000 soldiers to attack the advancing Later Zhou forces despite criticism from Song Qiqiu. An additional 30,000 troops were dispatched to Dingyuan under Huangfu Hui (皇甫暉) and Yao Feng (姚鳳).

Shou Prefecture (壽州) or Shouzhou was centered on modern Shouchun (壽春). The city controlled traffic along the Huai and was a major conduit of travel to the north. Prior to the war the commander of Shouzhou, Liu Renzhan (劉仁瞻), critiqued the defensive border cuts proposed by Wu Tingshao but was ignored by Li Jing. Capturing the city was necessary for the Later Zhou to secure their foothold across the Huai. Throughout January and February the Later Zhou scored several victories against local Southern Tang military units and began the Siege of Shouzhou. The Southern Tang army commanded by Liu Yanzhen approached the Later Zhou camp with several hundred ships. Originally Chai Rong had envisioned gaining a foothold on the southern bank of the Huai followed by an eastern advance. However the pontoon bridge was susceptible to attack from the formidable Southern Tang navy. This threatened the ability of the Later Zhou to supply their forces and project their power. Li Gu feared the bridge would be destroyed and leave the Later Zhou army without a means to retreat. Consequently, he ordered his forces to cross back to the northern bank of the Huai.

Chai Rong arrived at Zhengyang on 5 March 956 and assumed personal command of the campaign. He disapproved of the withdrawal and appointed his cousin Li Chongjin to replace Li Gu. Many Southern Tang officers became overconfident after the Later Zhou retreat and their forces became spread thinly across many miles. Among them Xian Shilang (咸師朗) advocated chasing after the Later Zhou army. This proposal was agreed to by Liu Yanzhen despite Liu Renzhan attempting to dissuade him from acting rashly. At Zhengyang the Southern Tang army was crushed by Li Chongjin. Liu Yanzhen died alongside over 10,000 soldiers and several of his subordinate generals were captured. In the aftermath of their victory the Later Zhou relocated the pontoon bridge downriver to Xiacai (下蔡) in Yingzhou. Zhao Kuangyin was ordered to attack the Southern Tang flotilla stationed at Tushan in modern Huaiyuan County. Zhao feinted a retreated outside the Southern Tang camp, drawing over 10,000 men into a trap at the confluence of the Huai and Guo Rivers. In the ensuing melee over 50 Southern Tang ships were captured and formed the basis of the Later Zhou navy. On 18 March 956 another Southern Tang relief force of 3,000 troops were defeated about 10 km away from Shouzhou. Over 40 more ships were captured in this engagement, further bolstering the budding Later Zhou navy.

The Southern Tang ordered a mobilization effort in Chuzhou to arm 100,000 men. When Chai Rong learned of this threatening development he ordered Zhao Kuangyin to attack and capture the city to prevent the effort. After the crushing defeat of Liu Yenzhen at Zhengyang the Southern Tang forces stationed at Dingyuan had retreated to Qingliu Pass outside Chuzhou. Zhao Kuangyin was able to maneuver his forces into advancing on the encamped Southern Tang army from several sides and forced their retreat into Chuzhou. In the ensuing battle Huangfu Hui was defeated by Zhao Kuangyin personally and along with Feng Yao was captured and sent to Chai Rong as prisoners. Huangfu Hui died several days later from his injuries. Chuzhou became secured by the Later Zhou and more settlements south of the Huai River began to seized.

=== Fall of Yangzhou ===
Yangzhou was the Southern Tang Eastern Capital and the former capital of Wu. The Southern Tang defensive strategy depended upon armed positions along the Huai River. In consequence authorities didn't prepare Yangzhou for a potential attack. When Chai Rong learned of this situation he ordered Han Lingkun (韓令坤) to capture the city. On 4 April 956 several hundred cavalry managed to infiltrate Yangzhou, which surprised the garrison into retreating. The local magistrate, Feng Yanlu, tried to hide as a Buddhist monk but was taken prisoner. Members of the former royal Yang family of Wu resided in nearby Taizhou. After the loss of Yangzhou they were ordered to relocate to Runzhou. Li Jing likely feared the Later Zhou would utilize them to provoke political unrest.

=== Wuyue intervention ===
The neighboring Wuyue maintained their independence from the Southern Tang by maintaining a position of vassalage to the Five Dynasties. They joined the conflict on the side of their Later Zhou overlords in April 956 despite division between members of the court. Strikes against Jiangyin and Xuanzhou were launched, with the commander of the former surrendering shortly afterwards. Changzhou became the next target of Wuyue attack, which, if captured, would imperil Runzhou near the capital of Jinling. The outer city of Changzhou quickly fell to forces under the command of Wu Cheng. A member of the Southern Tang Imperial Guard, Chai Kehong (柴克宏), was ordered to lead an army designated to relieve Changzhou. This appointment received criticism as he was seen by many as an idle gambler and drunkard. Combat in Huainan left only aged men available and were equipped with dilapidated equipment and weapons. After arriving outside Changzhou the majority of the Southern Tang force was hidden. Chai Kehong met with Wu Cheng and informed him that his purpose was to escort Qiao Kuangshun (喬匡舜), a Southern Tang diplomat, from Wuyue back to Jinling. Wu Cheng believed him and didn't take any defensive precautions. Chai Kehong soon ordered an attack and dealt the Wuyue army a crushing defeat in which over 10,000 troops were killed. With Changzhou no longer under attack Chai Kehong requested to lead the coming attack on the Later Zhou army encamped outside Shouzhou. Unfortunately for the Southern Tang war effort however he died in Taixing from an ulcer.

== Peace attempts ==
In spring 956 Li Jing pleaded for peace and sent his officials Zhong Mo (鍾謨) and Li Deming (李德明), both skilled orators, to request an end to hostilities. Once at the Later Zhou army encamped outside Shouzhou they submitted tributes of imperial clothing, tea, traditional medicine, gold, silver, silk, cattle, and wine. On 1 April 956 Chai Rong rebuffed the Southern Tang officials, and in what has been described as a bluff, demanded that Li Jing beg forgiveness in person instead:

"He is separated from me by a river only, but has never sent envoys to establish good relations and instead only communicated with the Liao via the sea. Thus, he has abandoned China and served the barbarians."

Indeed, a Southern Tang emissary had been sent to seek aid from the Liao dynasty. They were however intercepted by Later Zhou authorities and never reached the Liao court. More attempts were made by Li Jing to end the conflict throughout spring 956. Sun Sheng and Wang Chongzhi (王崇質) were sent to pay additional tributes of gold, silver, and silk to Chai Rong. With them was a submissive petition (i.e., as a subject, rather than on equal terms) written by Li Jing:

Ever since Tianyou [(天佑, Tang's last era name)], the realm had been divided into parts; parts were occupied by warlords, and parts kept changing ruling families. I, your subject, inherited from my father, and I possessed the lands south of the Yangtze, but I was looking forward to being able to submit to a phoenix. Now, heaven has bestowed its mandate on you, and your fame and guidance reach through all the lands. I am willing to be like the Two Zhes [(i.e., Wuyue, whose lands were Tang's former Zhexi and Zhedong Circuits)] and Hunan [(i.e., the former Chu lands, then again under vassalage of Later Zhou)], to accept the rightful calendar and defend just my own territory. May you take back your military punishment and pardon my sins of late submission. Let us be the first of your subordinate states, and be a subject to you on the outside. Then, your grace will calm everyone from a far, and no one will dare to resist you.

Li Deming and Sun Sheng were later sent with an offer by Li Jing to relinquish his imperial title; give annual tributes of gold and silk; and cede six prefectures—Chuzhou, Guangzhou, Haizhou, Haozhou, Shouzhou, and Shuzhou—to the Later Zhou. This wasn't an appealing proposal to Chai Rong, who rejected it. As his forces had already occupied half of these territories south of the Huai River, he believed it possible to conquer all Southern Tang territory north of the Yangtze River. Li Deming later relayed the Later Zhou demands to the Southern Tang court, arguing to cede all territory north of the Yangtze in return for peace. Despite being informed of the threatening Later Zhou military presence, Li Jing was displeased at the report. Song Qiqiu argued that ceding land had no benefit to the state. An envoy that had previously accompanied Li Deming to Shouzhou was bribed by Chen Jue into making a different assessment of the Later Zhou military. Chen Jue then stated to Li Jing, "Li Deming has sold out the empire for his own benefit." Incensed at the accusation, Li Jing executed Li Deming which ended hopes of peace at that point.

== Continued hostilities ==
With the faltering peace efforts, Li Jingda was commissioned to lead 50,000 troops and lift the siege of Shouzhou. Despite criticism of their paltry performances as commanders by Han Xizai, Bian Hao and Chen Jue were selected as his subordinates. Li Jingda reportedly lacked military talent and essentially only signed orders that Chen Jue had drafted. This poor leadership left morale low among the Southern Tang forces. Meanwhile, Zhu Yuan (朱元) was directed to recapture territory lost to the Later Zhou. He was able to quickly regain Shuzhou and Hezhou Prefectures. Another army under Li Ping (李平) meanwhile took back Qizhou Prefecture. Chai Rong withdrew from Jiangdu due to these losses and Li Jingda's army approaching Shouzhou.

Over 10,000 Southern Tang troops were dispatched and briefly reclaimed Yangzhou. However Chai Rong ordered the city be reclaimed, with any men found retreating to have their legs cut off. Yangzhou quickly was recaptured by the Later Zhou. Li Jingda meanwhile established a defensive position with 20,000 men around 50 km west of Yangzhou. This force was ten times larger than the Later Zhou armies in the area. Zhao Kuangyin advised Chai Rong to wait for Li Jindga to mount an offensive. In an ensuing battle Zhao Kuangyin led the Later Zhou cavalry to victory against their enemies. Over half of Li Jingda's army was killed which destroyed much of the Southern Tang pool of veteran troops. Chai Rong departed for Bian on 17 June 956 and left his armies under the command of Li Chongjin. The Southern Tang made minor gains against the Later Zhou in his absence. Rather than push an offensive, Li Jing took the advice of Song Qiqiu and ordered his commanders to remain on the defensive and not attack Later Zhou positions. After the embarrassing string of defeats in the campaign Li Jing likely doubted the abilities of his remaining officers. Meanwhile, Liu Renzhan mounted an attack on the Later Zhou camp outside Shouzhou and successfully destroyed some of their siege equipment and killed several hundred troops.

In winter 956 discord arose between Zhang Yongde, brother-in-law of Chai Rong, and Li Chongjin. When the Southern Tang learned of the feud Li Chongjin was secretly contacted to encourage him to rebel. However the letter was presented to Chai Rong, who became incensed at the contents. Sun Sheng was interrogated about Li Jing's behavior. Chair Rong demanded Southern Tang state secrets as well. However Sun Sheng refused to divulge information and instead requested to be executed. While Chai Rong consented and ordered Sun Sheng to be killed he soon regretted executing the faithful Southern Tang official. Meanwhile, another attempt by Li Jing was made to contact the Liao dynasty for military support. Chen Chuyao was dispatched over the Yellow Sea to request aid from Emperor Muzong. Once at the Liao court Chen Chuyao was detained by Muzong who refused to intervene in the conflict.

=== Fall of Shouzhou ===
By spring 957 Shouzhou was in a desperate situation as food supplies dwindled. Nonetheless, its continued fierce resistance made many Later Zhou officials call for an end of the campaign. Southern Tang forces under Li Jingda were concentrated at Haozhou, roughly 90 km away from the embattled city. A relief force was sent and reached Purple Mountain where they erected defensive structures. Li Chongjin led an attack on the stockades and killed around 5,000 Southern Tang troops. Disunity filtered through Li Jingda's army. Chen Jue had submitted a petition arguing that the successful, yet often disobedient general Zhu Yuan (朱元) could not be trusted. Consequently, Yang Shouzhong was sent to replace him. This incensed Zhu Yuan to surrender to the Later Zhou with more than 10,000 soldiers, which further weakened the Southern Tang position.

Li Gu advised Chai Rong to assume control of the siege of Shouzhou once more to bolster the morale of his troops. The city was also close to surrender. Returning south in April, on the 9th Chai Rong successfully attacked the Southern Tang positions at Purple Mountain in what became another crushing defeat. About 40,000 Southern Tang were killed and generals Bian Hao, Xu Wenzhen (許文稹), and Yang Shouzhong 楊守忠) were captured. Li Jingda and Chen Jue fled back to Jinling. With Liu Renzhan nearly dead from illness, the beleaguered Southern Tang garrison of Shouzhou finally surrendered on 23 April 957 after being besieged for 14 months. When Liu Renzhan died shortly afterwards he was bestowed posthumous honors by Li Jing for his faithfullness in defending Shouzhou for so long. After finally capturing Shouzhou the Later Zhou forces advanced on Jiangdu. The Southern Tang garrison burned and abandoned the city. Throughout the winter of 957 Later Zhou forces captured a number of Southern Tang cities as they marched southwards, even gaining a direct land connection to their Wuyue vassal. Southern Tang control over Huainan was firmly removed.

== End of conflict ==
In April 958 Li Jing sent out envoys again seeking peace with Chai Rong. The Southern Tang offered to cede all territory north of the Yangtze to the Later Zhou and become a vassal. These terms were acceptable to Chai Rong. The state once called Great Tang (大唐) was rebranded the less grandiose Jiangnan (江南). Li Jing renounced the title of emperor and assumed the title of King of Jiangnan. The Later Zhou calendar and reign title were additionally adopted by the court of Jiangnan. The Later Zhou gained control over almost a quarter million families.

== Bibliography ==
- Clark, Hugh R. (2009). "The Southern Kingdoms between the T'ang and the Sung, 907–979". In Twitchett, Denis; Smith, Paul J. (eds.). The Sung Dynasty and its Precursors, 907–1279, Part 1. The Cambridge History of China. Vol. 5. New York: Cambridge University Press. pp. 133–205. ISBN 978-0-521-81248-1.
- Sima Guang (1084). Zizhi Tongjian. Vol. 9.
- Kurz, Johannes (2016). "On the Unification Plans of the Southern Tang Dynasty". Journal of Asian History. 50 (1): 23–45. doi:10.13173/jasiahist.50.1.0023. JSTOR 10.13173/jasiahist.50.1.0023.
- Kurz, Johannes L. (2011). China's Southern Tang Dynasty (937–976). Routledge. ISBN 9780415454964.
- Lorge, Peter (2015). The Reunification of China: Peace through War under the Song Dynasty. Cambridge University Press. ISBN 978-1-107-08475-9 – via Google Books.
- Lorge, Peter (2013). "Fighting Against Empire: Resistance to the Later Zhou and Song Conquest of China". In Lorge, Peter A. (ed.). Debating War in Chinese History. Leiden and New York: Brill. pp. 107–140. ISBN 978-90-04-22372-1.
- Lorge, Peter A. (2005). War, Politics and Society in Early Modern China, 900–1795. London and New York: Routledge. ISBN 0-415-31690-1.
- Standen, Naomi (1994). Frontier crossings from north China to Liao, c. 900–1005 (PhD thesis). Durham University.
