= Shuiqiu Zhaoquan =

Shuiqiu Zhaoquan (水丘昭券) (died 947), was born in Anguo County, Yijin Base, during the Five Dynasties and Ten Kingdoms period. He was descendant of Shuiqiu Cen (水丘岑), the Colonel Director of Retainers during the Eastern Han dynasty. He was known for his honest and generous character, as well as his literacy and propriety. Since both the grandmother and mother of Wuyue's king Qian Liu(King Wusu) came from the Shuiqiu clan, Shuiqiu Zhaoquan entered government service due to his status as a royal relative.

During the reign of Qian Hongzuo (錢弘佐) (King Zhongxian), Shuiqiu Zhaoquan served as Inner Palace Commissioner. In 945, Southern Tang's Emperor Yuanzong Li Jing (李璟) led troops to attack Fuzhou, throwing the Min kingdom into chaos. The Min general Li Renda (李仁達) came to Wuyue seeking aid. While many Wuyue generals wished to refuse due to the distance, Shuiqiu Zhaoquan, considering long-term interests, strongly urged Qian Hongzuo to dispatch troops. Subsequently, military affairs were placed under his command. In the third month of 947, he inflicted a major defeat on the Southern Tang army, securing Wuyue's southeastern border. When Qian Hongzuo wished to execute Cheng Zhaoyue (程昭悅), he ordered Shuiqiu Zhaoquan to lead a thousand armored soldiers to surround Cheng's residence at night, but Shuiqiu Zhaoquan remonstrated: "Zhaoyue is a household servant; if guilty, he should be publicly executed, not attacked by night." Qian Hongzuo recognized that Shuiqiu Zhaoquan understood the larger principle.

In the same year, Qian Hongzong (錢弘倧) (King Zhongxun) ascended the throne, while Hu Jinsi (胡進思), the commander of the headquarter corps acted with arbitrary brutality. Qian Hongzong conspired with He Chengxun (何承訓) and Shuiqiu Zhaoquan to expel Hu Jinsi to a distant post. Shuiqiu Zhaoquan argued that "Jinsi's faction is strong; he cannot be suddenly removed. It is better to temporarily tolerate him and wait for a later solution." Qian Hongzong hesitated, but He Chengxun revealed the plot to Hu Jinsi. Several days later, when Qian Hongzong hosted a night banquet for officers, Hu Jinsi suspected an attempt to capture and kill him. He donned military uniform and led one hundred personal troops to confront the king at the Tiance Hall, declaring: "I am guiltless; why am I being plotted against?"

Hu Jinsi then deposed and imprisoned Qian Hongzong, and installed his younger brother Qian Hongchu (錢弘俶) as King of Wuyue. He also murdered Qian Hongzong's maternal uncle, Kuang Guangxuan (鄜光鉉), and Shuiqiu Zhaoquan. Upon hearing of Shuiqiu Zhaoquan's death, Hu Jinsi's wife wept in anguish: "Others might be killed, but Zhaoquan was a gentleman—how could he be killed?"
