= Wu Cheng (Wuyue) =

Politician in Chinese Five Dynasties and Ten Kingdoms Period

Wu Cheng (吳程 ; 893 – September 14, 965), courtesy name Zhengchen (正臣), was a politician of the Chinese Five Dynasties and Ten Kingdoms Period state Wuyue, serving as a chancellor during the reign of its last two kings, Qian Hongzong (King Zhongxun) and Qian Chu (King Zhongyi).

== Background ==
Wu Cheng was born in 893, during the reign of Emperor Zhaozong of Tang. He was from Shanyin (山陰, in modern Shaoxing, Zhejiang). His grandfather Wu Kexin (吳可信) was a county magistrate during Tang, and his father Wu Yue (吳蛻) passed the Tang imperial examinations in the Jinshi class during Emperor Zhaozong's Dashun era (890–891). After passing the imperial examinations, Wu Yue was made the secretary general of Zhendong Circuit (鎮東, headquartered in modern Shaoxing), then under the control of the warlord Qian Liu.

== During Qian Liu's reign ==
In 907, the Tang throne was seized by the major warlord Zhu Quanzhong, who established a new state of Later Liang as its emperor. Qian Liu became a vassal of Later Liang, and was created the Prince of Wuyue (later receiving the greater title King of Wuyue in 923 and posthumously known as King Wusu). Sometime during Qian Liu's reign, Wu Cheng, apparently on account of his father's service to the king, was given the offices of Xiaoshu Lang (校書郎), and then acting Hubu Yuanwailang (戶部員外郎), by the king under the authority of the emperor. Toward the end of Qian's Baozheng era (926–931), Qian was trying to find an appropriate husband for one of his daughters. He summoned Wu, along with two other sons of prominent officials, Meng Can (孟粲) and Yu Bao (于葆), to his presence. He examined the three of them, particularly Wu, and then chose Wu to be his daughter's husband. He bestowed (in the emperor's authority) the title of Jinbu Langzhong (金部郎中) on Wu. As he considered Wu capable in administrative matters, he put Wu in charge of overseeing the paperwork from various departments of his government.

== During Qian Yuanguan's reign ==
After Qian Liu died in 932 and was succeeded by his son Qian Yuanguan (King Wenmu), Qian Yuanguan bestowed (in the emperor's authority) the title of Zhifang Langzhong (職方郎中) on Wu Cheng, and made Wu his assistant in both of his roles as governor (觀察使, Guanchashi) and military governor (Jiedushi). Later, during the Tianfu era (used by two of Qian Yuanguan's suzerains — Shi Jingtang and Shi Chonggui the emperors of Later Jin) (936–947), Qian Yuanguan made one of his sons, Qian Hongxuan (錢弘儇), the prefect of Mu Prefecture (睦州, in modern Hangzhou, Zhejiang), but did not actually send Qian Hongxuan to Mu; instead, he made Wu the acting prefect, being actually in charge there.

== During the reigns of the last three kings ==
It is not clear what role Wu Cheng served in during the subsequent reign of Qian Yuanguan's son Qian Hongzuo (King Zhongxian) (r. 941–947). During the subsequent reign of Qian Hongzuo's younger brother Qian Hongzong (King Zhongxun) (947), Qian Hongzong made Wu in charge of the western headquarters (i.e., Zhenhai Circuit (鎮海), headquartered at Wuyue's capital Qiantang (錢塘, in modern Hangzhou)), and shortly after made him a chancellor. Shortly after, when the warlord Li Ruyun, who had actual control of Weiwu Circuit (威武, headquartered in modern Fuzhou, Fujian) but was a Wuyue vassal, tried to turn against Wuyue, the Wuyue general stationed at Weiwu's capital Fu Prefecture (福州), Bao Xiurang (鮑修讓), assassinated him and took control of the circuit on Wuyue's behalf. Qian Hongzong thereafter sent Wu to Weiwu to take over as acting military governor, and apparently thereafter made him full military governor.

In 950, Cha Wenhui (查文徽), a general of Wuyue's western neighbor Southern Tang who was serving as Southern Tang's acting military governor of Yong'an Circuit (永安, headquartered in modern Nanping, Fujian), mistakenly believed that Wuyue had abandoned Fu Prefecture and that he could take it over. Cha therefore took his army and headed toward Fu. Hearing that Cha was approaching, Wu decided to mislead him by sending soldiers out of the city to welcome Cha. Cha thereafter entered the city and fell into an ambush set by Wu, and was captured. Wu delivered Cha to Qiantang, where Qian Hongzuo's younger brother and successor Qian Hongchu (King Zhongyi) presented him to the Wuyue royal ancestral temple but then released him. Later, Qian Hongchu recalled Wu to Qiantang and again made him chancellor, serving alongside Yuan Dezhao.

In 956, when Southern Tang's northern neighbor Later Zhou, to which Wuyue was a vassal, launched a major attack on Southern Tang, Qian Hongchu launched his army and stationed it on the border with Southern Tang, waiting for orders from the Later Zhou emperor Guo Rong on whether to attack Southern Tang. The army officer Chen Man (陳滿) argued to Wu that Southern Tang was in shock over the Later Zhou invasion and that its important city Chang Prefecture (常州, in modern Changzhou, Jiangsu) would be defenseless and could easily be taken; subsequently, Chen falsely informed Wu that the Later Zhou emperor had already ordered Wuyue to attack. Wu advocated to Qian that Wuyue launch an attack. Yuan opposed, however, stating to Qian Hongchu: "Tang is a large state, and we cannot take it lightly. If we enter Tang territory and Zhou forces do not arrive, we would be with no other allies, and we would be in danger. Please wait." Qian Hongchu, however, ultimately listened to Wu, and put him in charge of the operations, with Bao and Luo Sheng (羅晟) serving under Wu. Wu told the soldiers, "Chancellor Yuan does not want to launch the attack." The soldiers became angry and tried to attack Yuan. Qian Hongchu hid Yuan in his palace and ordered that those advocating assaulting Yuan be arrested, while sighing, "Just as the army is launched, the soldiers want to attack the chancellor. This is a sign of misfortune."

Wu's attack on Chang was initially successful, as the outer city fell. The Southern Tang military prefect of Chang, Zhao Renze (趙仁澤), was captured by Wuyue forces and delivered to Qiantang. However, Wu, who had previous disputes with Bao and Luo, humiliated them, causing them to be displeased. Meanwhile, the Southern Tang general Chai Kehong (柴克宏) arrived at Chang, but, hiding most of his troops, claimed to be merely there to escort the Southern Tang emissary Qiao Kuangshun (喬匡舜), whom Southern Tang's emperor Li Jing had previously sent to Wuyue, back to Southern Tang. Wu did not appreciate the risk and took no precautions. When Chai then launched a surprise attack on the Wuyue camp, Luo did not engage fully and allowed the Southern Tang army to head toward Wu's headquarters. Wu barely escaped the attack, but the Wuyue forces were routed. When Wu returned to Qiantang, Qian Hongchu stripped him of his offices.

Wu Cheng died in 965, at the age of 72. At his death, Qian Hongchu (whose name had been changed to Qian Chu by that point) restored his titles and gave him the posthumous name of Zhonglie (忠烈, "faithful and achieving").

== Notes and references ==
- Spring and Autumn Annals of the Ten Kingdoms, vol. 87.
- Zizhi Tongjian, vols. 287, 289, 292, 293.
