= Chu Prefecture =

Chu Prefecture may refer to:

- Chu Prefecture (Jiangsu) (楚州), a prefecture between the 6th and 13th centuries in modern Jiangsu, China
- Chu Prefecture (Anhui) (滁州), a prefecture between the 7th and 13th centuries in modern Anhui, China
- Chu Prefecture (Zhejiang) (處州), a prefecture between the 6th and 13th centuries in modern Zhejiang, China

== See also ==
- Chu (disambiguation)
