= Siege of Shouzhou =

- Part of Later Zhou conquest of Huainan
Date	955–957 AD
Location	Shouzhou
Result	Later Zhou victory

Belligerents
Later Zhou	Southern Tang

Commanders and leaders
Chai Rong (Emperor Shizong of Later Zhou) Zhao Kuangyin	Liu Renshan (劉仁贍)

Strength
Unknown, likely large	Unknown, many armies

Casualties and losses
Likely high	Very high, many armies destroyed

The siege of Shouzhou (Chinese: 壽州之戰) was a two year long (955–957 AD) siege conducted by the Later Zhou dynasty against Shouzhou, a major fortress of the Southern Tang dynasty on the Yangtze River, during the Five Dynasties and Ten Kingdoms period. The Later Zhou would eventually capture Shouzhou and destroy most of the Southern Tang troops in the process, severely crippling the Southern Tang and ending its short time as one of China's major states.

== Background ==
With the collapse of the Tang dynasty in the early part of the 10th century China became split between many states. The majority of the north was controlled by a single state, but that state saw frequent revolutions and changes of leadership. The south meanwhile was split between many feuding kingdoms. By 954 AD, the Later Zhou were the dynasty in the north while in the south the Southern Tang had conquered many of their neighbours and were the second to Later Zhou in power.

== Prelude ==
For once the north was internally stable and so Emperor Guo Rong (Zhou Shizong) of the Later Zhou gave his general Li Gu an army and commanded him to take Shouzhou, the main stronghold held by the Southern Tang north of the Yangtze. Li Gu managed to defeat the Southern Tang forces twice but was forced to withdraw when his lines of retreat were threatened. After this Guo Rong himself took over. He defeated a Southern Tang army and laid siege to Shouzhou.

== Siege ==
The Southern Tang again tried to threaten the Later Zhou's line of retreat but this time they were defeated. Details of the siege itself are slim, but we know many details of the campaigns of Southern Tang armies that were sent to relieve the city in the two years the city was besieged. They were all defeated. All these Southern Tang armies were defeated without one gaining a major victory mainly due to Zhao Kuang Yin (future emperor Taizu of Song) who was the most talented commander of his time. Despite these victories the soldiers inside Shouzhou led by Liu Renzhan refused to surrender until all Southern Tang forces were defeated. This came in 957 AD when the last Southern Tang army north of the Yangtze was destroyed. The defenders then finally surrendered.

== Aftermath ==
With their armies gone and the main fort holding a major Zhou invasion of their territory also gone, the Southern Tang had to sue for peace. The peace gave Later Zhou all Southern Tang territory above the Yangtze and practically made Tang a vassal of Zhou. Zhao Kuang Yin used his popularity gained due to his many victories during the siege to overthrow Guo Rong's son in 960 AD, founding the Song dynasty. With the Southern Tang severely weakened the Song were in good position to unify China, which they would 980 AD.
