= Yang Renquan =

Yang Renquan (仰仁詮) (died 940s) was a general and politician of the Chinese Five Dynasties and Ten Kingdoms state Wuyue, eventually reaching the position of chancellor. His daughter was the second wife of Wuyue's third king Qian Hongzuo.

== Background and service under Qian Yuanguan ==
It is not known when Yang Renquan was born, but it is known that he was from Hu Prefecture (湖州, in modern Huzhou, Zhejiang). During the reign of Wuyue's second king Qian Yuanguan, he became a commander of his headquarter guards, and was said to be capable and intelligent.

The first historical reference to Yang was in 933, when Qian Yuanguan was dealing with his younger brother Qian Yuanxiang (錢元珦), who was then the acting prefect of Ming Prefecture (明州, in modern Ningbo, Zhejiang), and was said to be arrogant and unlawful in his actions, often making inappropriate requests to Qian Yuanguan and being cruel toward his staffers. Qian Yuanguan sent Yang to Ming to summon Qian Yuanxiang back to the capital Qiantang (錢塘, in modern Hangzhou, Zhejiang). Yang's subordinates believed that the mission might be dangerous and that he should take military precautions, but Yang, ignoring them, wore regular clothes and headed for Ming. When Yang arrived at Ming, Qian Yuanxiang became frightened and returned to Qiantang with him without incident. Qian Yuanguan then put Qian Yuanxiang under house arrest. (Qian Yuanguan would eventually execute Qian Yuanxiang in 937.)

In 940, Wuyue's southern neighbor Min was in civil war, as its emperor Wang Yanxi (also known as Wang Xi) and Wang Yanxi's younger brother Wang Yanzheng the prefect of Jian Prefecture (建州, in modern Nanping, Fujian) were battling each other, and Wang Yanxi's generals Pan Shikui (潘師逵) and Wu Xingzhen (吳行真) were putting Jian under siege. Wang Yanzheng sought aid from Qian Yuanguan. Despite advice by the chancellor Lin Ding against doing so, Qian Yuanguan launched an army commanded by Yang and Xue Wanzhong (薛萬忠) to aid Wang Yanzheng. (At that time, Yang carried the title of military governor (Jiedushi) of Ningguo Circuit (寧國, headquartered in modern Xuancheng, Anhui — an honorary title as Ningguo was then the territory of Wuyue's northern neighbor Wu) and chancellor (同中書門下平章事, Tong Zhongshu Menxia Pingzhangshi).) Before they could arrive, however, Wang Yanzheng had already defeated Wang Yanxi's army himself and therefore asked the Wuyue army to withdraw, offering it gifts for doing so. Yang refused, and set up camp near Jian. Wang Yanzheng, in fear, turned to Wang Yanxi and asked him for aid. Wang Yanxi sent his nephew Wang Jiye (王繼業) to aid Wang Yanzheng and also sent another army to cut off the Wuyue army's supply route. With torrential rains arriving and the food supply running low for the Wuyue army, Wang Yanzheng attacked it and defeated it, forcing Yang to withdraw.

== Service under Qian Hongzuo ==
In 941, Qian Yuanguan died, and his son Qian Hongzuo succeeded him as king. It appeared that Yang Renquan continued to carry the title of military governor of Ningguo. In 943, Qian Hongzuo, whose first wife Lady Du had died, married Yang Renquan's daughter Consort Yang as his second wife. Yang Renquan thereafter became a chancellor, but died not long after, as did Consort Yang. (It is not known which of them died first.) (However, the chronicles of Qian Yuanguan's reign in the Spring and Autumn Annals of the Ten Kingdoms also, contrary to the implications of Yang Renquan's biography in the same work, indicated that Yang Renquan died in 941 prior to Qian Yuanguan's death.)

== Notes and references ==
- Spring and Autumn Annals of the Ten Kingdoms, vol. 86.
- Zizhi Tongjian, vols. 278, 282, 283.
