= Lin Ding =

Lin Ding (林鼎) (courtesy name Huanwen (煥文); 891-February 25, 944) was an official of the Chinese Five Dynasties and Ten Kingdoms Period Wuyue state, serving as the chancellor of the state during the reign of its second king Qian Yuanguan (né Qian Chuanguan) and probably during the reign of its third king Qian Hongzuo.

== Background ==
Lin Ding was born in 891, during the reign of Emperor Zhaozong of Tang. The family of his father Lin Wuyin (林無隱) was from Houguan (侯官, in modern Fuzhou, Fujian), but Lin Wuyin, who was known to be a poet, left his home territory and was residing in Ming Prefecture (明州, in modern Ningbo, Zhejiang). Then-prefect of Ming, Huang Sheng (黃晟), was respectful to the intelligentsia, and Lin Wuyin became dependent on him for support. Lin Ding was thus born at Ming.

When Lin Ding grew older, he went to pay homage to then-ruler of the region, Qian Liu (whose domain had become the state of Wuyue). Qian Liu made Lin an officer at his headquarters, and soon thereafter assigned Lin to serve on staff of his son Qian Chuanguan. Qian Chuanguan became impressed with Lin's abilities, and often recommended him for greater responsibilities, but Qian Liu did not react. One day, when Qian Chuanguan again went to see his father to recommend Lin, Qian Liu responded, "Lin Ding has an unusual bone structure. He would have the proper disposition to be a chancellor. But I have no intention to give him great honors. I want you to be the one doing that, so that he would be faithful to you."

== Service under Qian Yuanguan ==
In 932, Qian Liu died. Qian Chuanguan (who then changed his name to Qian Yuanguan) assumed control of the state, and for some time only claimed the title of military governor (Jiedushi) of Zhenhai (鎮海, headquartered at Wuyue's capital Hang Prefecture (杭州), in modern Hangzhou, Zhejiang) and Zhendong (鎮東, headquartered in modern Shaoxing, Zhejiang) Circuits, as vassal to Later Tang. He made Lin Ding his secretary and assistant in his role as military governor of Zhenhai.

It was said that while serving under Qian Yuanguan, Lin was honest and upright in character, and showed excellent memory. He was capable in calligraphy, in the style of Ouyang Xun and Yu Shinan. He was studious in his middle age and was involved not only in reading but also collecting books. He also took the time to copy the books over, and to fill in the missing parts. In 937, after Qian Yuanguan assumed the title of King of Wuyue, he made Lin to be his cultural officer. Lin was later made chancellor. As chancellor, Lin was said to be attentive to pointing out the problems in Qian Yuanguan's administration without avoiding difficult discussions. In 940, when Qian Yuanguan became intent to intervene in the civil war of Wuyue's southern neighbor Min (between Min's king Wang Yanxi and Wang Yanxi's younger brother Wang Yanzheng), Lin tried to dissuade him, but was unable to stop him from sending a detachment commanded by the generals Yang Renquan and Xue Wanzhong (薛萬忠) to intervene on Wang Yanzheng's behalf. The mission turned in failure when the Wang brothers ended up rejoining forces against the Wuyue army. The people respected Lin for foreseeing the lack of accomplishment of the mission.

== Service under Qian Hongzuo ==
Qian Yuanguan died in 941 and was succeeded by his son Qian Hongzuo. Lin Ding remained chancellor. He died in 944 and was given the posthumous name Zhenxian (貞獻, "honest and wise"). He left a 20-volume work.

== Notes and references ==
- Spring and Autumn Annals of the Ten Kingdoms, vol. 86.
- Zizhi Tongjian, vols. 281, 282.
