= Chuzhou (disambiguation) =

Chuzhou is a prefectural-level city in modern Anhui, China.

Chuzhou may also refer to:

- Chuzhou (in modern Jiangsu), a historical prefecture around Huai'an, Jiangsu, China between the 6th and 13th centuries
- Huai'an District in Huai'an, Jiangsu, China, formerly known as Chuzhou District
