= Consort Yang (Wuyue) =

Consort Yang, titled Yuanfei (仰元妃), was the second wife of Qian Hongzuo (King Zhongxian), the third king of the Chinese Five Dynasties and Ten Kingdoms Period state Wuyue — and the only known wife when he was king.

Little is known about Consort Yang herself. Her father Yang Renquan was a prominent general under Qian Hongzuo's father Qian Yuanguan (King Wenmu), reaching the title of military governor (Jiedushi). In 943, Qian Hongzuo, whose first wife Lady Du had died, married her as his second wife. She died not long after, however.

== Notes and references ==
Chinese nobility
Preceded by Lady Xu Xinyue	Lady Consort of Wuyue; 943-?	Succeeded by Queen Sun Taizhen
