= Xu Xinyue =

Chinese royal concubine (c. 902–946)

Xu Xinyue (Chinese: 許新月; c. 902?-August 1, 946), formally the Lady Renhui of Wuyue (吳越國仁惠夫人), was a concubine, possibly later a wife, of Qian Yuanguan (King Wenmu) (né Qian Chuanguan, name changed to Qian Yuanguan upon his succession to the throne), the second king of the Chinese state Wuyue of the Five Dynasties and Ten Kingdoms period, and the mother to his son and successor Qian Hongzuo (King Wenxian).

== Background and acts before Qian Yuanguan's reign ==
Little is known about Lady Xu's background other than that she was from Tai Prefecture (台州, in modern Taizhou, Zhejiang) and that she was possibly born in 903, during the reign of Emperor Zhaozong of Tang. It is not known when she became Qian Chuanguan's concubine, but it is known that she was well-versed in music and therefore was put in charge of music in his palace. When another concubine of his, Lady Fu, gave birth to his son Qian Hongzun — who would later become the designated heir until his untimely death in 940 at age 15 — in 925, Lady Fu became very honored in the palace and was created the Lady of Lu. (At that time, Qian Chuanguan was himself still serving under his father Qian Liu the king, but was already serving as acting military governor of Wuyue's main circuits, Zhenhai (鎮海, headquartered in modern Hangzhou, Zhejiang) and Zhendong (鎮東, headquartered in modern Shaoxing, Zhejiang), and therefore was commonly viewed as his heir.) A Buddhist nun named Qiyun (契雲), who was in charge of offering incense in the palace and who was considered a good judge of character, however, stated to Lady Xu, "Lady Fu can never match you. You, lady, should take care of yourself." She subsequently gave birth to Qian Chuanguan's sixth son, Qian Hongzuo, in 928.

== During and after Qian Yuanguan's reign ==
Sometime after Qian Chuanguan's becoming the ruler of Wuyue upon his father Qian Liu's death in 932 (and thereafter changed his name to Qian Yuanguan), Lady Xu received the title of Lady of Wuyue — probably after the death of his then-wife Lady Ma in 939, because Lady Ma carried the title of Lady of Wuyue until her death. (The title of Lady of Wuyue might be an indication that Lady Xu effectively became Qian Yuanguan's wife by this point.)

Qian Yuanguan died in 942, and Lady Xu's son Qian Hongzuo became king. She herself died in 945, and was given a posthumous name of Renhui ("kind and benevolent").

Chinese nobility
Preceded by Lady Ma	Lady Consort of Wuyue; 939?-941	Succeeded by Consort Yang

== Notes and references ==
- Spring and Autumn Annals of the Ten Kingdoms (十國春秋), vol. 83.
