= Quzhou (disambiguation) =

Quzhou (衢州) is a modern prefecture-level city in Zhejiang, China.

Quzhou may also refer to:

- Quzhou County (曲周), Hebei, China
- Quzhou (渠州), a former prefecture in roughly modern Qu County, Sichuan, China
