= Li Yuanqing =

Li Yuanqing (李元清) was an official of Southern Tang during Five Dynasties and Ten Kingdoms period, born in Haozhou (濠州).

When Later Zhou attacked Huainan (淮南), Li Yuanqing's father gathered local volunteers, fashioned armor from paper, and styled them the "White Armor Army", joining government troops in defending the Haozhou river fortress. After their defeat, Li Yuanqing relocated to Jinling (金陵). He could run fast enough to overtake horses and often traveled on foot to Bianjing (汴梁) and Luoyang (洛阳) to gather intelligence. When Li Houzhu Li Yu (李煜) succeeded to the throne, he appointed Li Yuanqing as Military Commissioner of Yongxin in Jizhou (吉州), due to its border with Hunan (湖南). Several times each month, Li Yuanqing would feign illness and abstain from holding court, disguising himself in commoner's clothes to enter Hunan territory. Enemy movements were thus known to Li Yuanqing before all others. After governing the region for many years, the border remained secure. Li Yuanqing petitioned that the people pay one bolt of silk each summer, convertible to one string of cash, yielding over one hundred thousand in annual tax revenue to be transported to Jinling. When Southern Tang fell, he entered Bianjing as a former official. Li Yuanqing swore he would not serve a second kingdom and feigned blindness. When a blade was drawn across his neck, he did not even blink, and so was permitted to return to Haozhou, where he died.
