= Shou Prefecture =

Historical administrative division in Anhui, China

Shouzhou or Shou Prefecture (壽州) was a zhou (prefecture) in imperial China centering on modern Shou County, Anhui, China. It existed (intermittently) from 589 to 1912.

== Geography ==
The administrative region of Shouzhou in the Tang dynasty falls within the administration of modern Lu'an, Anhui. It probably includes parts of modern:

- Shou County
- Lu'an: Yu'an District, Jin'an District
- Huoshan County
- Huoqiu County

In 956, the Later Zhou state moved the headquarter from modern Shou County further north to modern Fengtai County (now under the administration of Huainan, Anhui).
