= Hu Jinsi =

Wuyue general (d. 948)

Hu Jinsi (胡進思) (died April 28, 948) was a general of the Chinese Five Dynasties and Ten Kingdoms Period state Wuyue, becoming powerful during the reign of its third king Qian Hongzuo (King Zhongxian). After Qian Hongzuo's death, Hu had frequent conflicts with Qian Hongzuo's brother and successor Qian Hongzong (King Zhongxun). Fearing that Qian Hongzong would kill him, he deposed Qian Hongzong in a coup and replaced him with his brother Qian Hongchu (King Zhongyi, later known as Qian Chu).

== Background ==
It is not known when Hu Jinsi was born (other than that it would have been during the late Tang years), but it is known that he was from Hu Prefecture (湖州, in modern Huzhou, Zhejiang). When he was young, he was a cattle butcher. He later became a soldier in the army of Zhenhai Circuit (鎮海, headquartered in modern Hangzhou, Zhejiang), which was then ruled by its military governor (Jiedushi), the late-Tang warlord Qian Liu (who would later be Wuyue's founding king, as King Wusu).

In 902, Qian Liu was attacked by Tian Jun, the military governor of Ningguo Circuit (寧國, headquartered in modern Xuancheng, Anhui), who himself was a vassal of the major warlord Yang Xingmi the military governor of Huainan Circuit (淮南, headquartered in modern Yangzhou, Jiangsu). His headquarters at Hang Prefecture (杭州) came under Tian's siege. While Yang - not wanting to see Tian becoming overly powerful - ordered Tian to withdraw, Tian extracted the price of having Qian send a son to return with him to Ningguo to serve as hostage (with Tian agreeing to give a daughter to him in marriage). Qian's son Qian Chuanguan volunteered, even though the situation was considered extremely perilous. Hu and another soldier, Dai Yun (戴惲), served as Qian Chuanguan's attendants on this journey, putting themselves in the same risks that Qian Chuanguan was under. After Tian rebelled against Yang and was killed in 903, Qian Chuanguan returned to Qian Liu's domain; presumably, Hu (and Dai) also accompanied him in his return.

After Qian Chuanguan (whose name had been changed to Qian Yuanguan by that point) assumed the reins of the Wuyue state (and would later take the title of King of Wuyue, a title that Qian Liu had, as King Wenmu) after Qian Liu's death in 932, he, remembering Hu's faithfulness, made Hu a general. Hu was eventually promoted to the post of right commander of the headquarter corps (右統軍使, You Tongjunshi).

== During Qian Hongzuo's reign ==
Qian Yuanguan died in 941 and was succeeded by his son Qian Hongzuo (as King Zhongxian). It was said that after Qian Hongzuo's succession to the throne, the upper commander of the headquarter corps, Kan Fan (闞璠), became dominant at the headquarters such that not even the King was able to curb his powers. When the officers Zhang De'an (章德安) and Li Wenqing (李文慶) disagreed with him, both were ejected from headquarters to serve as prefectural prefects, and it was said that after Zhang and Li's departures, Kan and Hu Jinsi became even more arrogant and controlling.

However, the apparent Kan-Hu alliance later broke down. By late 945, Qian was said to have trusted the wicked officer Cheng Zhaoyue (程昭悅), who had previously been a wealthy merchant who was able to become an officer by ingratiating Kan and Du Zhaoda (杜昭達), a nephew to Qian's deceased wife Lady Du. Kan became irritated at the close association between Qian and Cheng, and when Cheng tried to appease Kan by apologizing to him, Kan made him more fearful by stating, "I wanted to kill you at first. Now that you are showing remorse, I will not do so." Cheng thereafter conspired with Hu, and had Qian issue orders making Kan and Hu the prefects of Ming (明州, in modern Ningbo, Zhejiang) and Hu Prefectures respectively. Kan initially wanted to refuse the order, but Hu persuaded him to accept, stating to him, "It is fortunate that we, as old soldiers, can receive large prefectures. Why not accept it?" After Kan left for Ming, Cheng found an excuse to keep Hu at headquarters. Cheng then falsely accused Kan and Du of wanting to support Qian's cousin Qian Renjun (錢仁俊) to be the new king, and Qian Hongzuo then put Kan and Du to death and put Qian Renjun under house arrest. Cheng used this opportunity to accuse many officers of being in league with Kan and Du, and it was said that some 100 were either killed or exiled. As Hu was said to appear to be careful and silent, Cheng considered him a non-threat and did not act against him. (Cheng himself would fall out with the king and be executed in 947, at which time Qian Renjun, who had been under house arrest, was released. There was no indication that Hu was involved with Cheng's death or receive any reprisals.)

== During Qian Hongzong's reign ==
In 947, Qian Hongzuo died, and was succeeded by his younger brother Qian Hongzong (King Zhongxun). Hu Jinsi remained powerful, apparently under the rationale that he helped Qian Hongzong's succession. However, Qian Hongzong was said to be displeased that during the reign of Qian Hongzuo, Qian Hongzuo had, due to his tolerance, created a culture that the generals had too much power to do as they wished, and therefore was looking to curb those powers.

Later in the year, the warlord Li Da, who then controlled the region of Fu Prefecture (福州, in modern Fuzhou, Fujian) as a Wuyue vessel, arrived at Wuyue's capital Qiantang to pay homage to the new king. Qian Hongzong gave him honorific titles and gave him a new name of Li Ruyun. Li Ruyun soon became apprehensive that Qian Hongzong would detain him at Qiantang and not allow him to return to Fu Prefecture, so he bribed Hu Jinsi with 20 gold bamboo shoots and other assorted treasures, asking for Hu's help in having him return to Fu. Hu made the request for him to the king, and Qian Hongzong agreed to let Li depart. Shortly after, Li, who was beginning to have conflicts with the Wuyue general Bao Xiurang (鮑修讓), whose army was stationed at Fu to both help him defend the city and watch his moves, and was plotting to assassinate Bao and surrender the city to Wuyue's neighbor Southern Tang. When Bao realized this, he ambushed Li and slaughtered Li's family.

Hu continued to have substantial power in the governance of the state, drawing Qian Hongzong's displeasure, and the king considered sending him out to be a prefect of a prefecture, but Hu declined. Nevertheless, from this point on, Hu's suggestions were often met with rebuke, such that Hu built a small shrine to Qian Hongzuo in his home, offering sacrifices there and shedding bitter tears. There was one occasion when Qian Hongzong was reviewing the troops and announced an award for them. Hu thought that the award was excessive and argued against it, but the young king angrily threw his pen in to the water and stated, "My wealth is to be shared with the soldiers. How is it that there can be a limit to that?" There was also once an incident where a civilian was accused of slaughtering a cow privately (i.e., without paying the taxes for doing so). The investigating officer claimed that the civilian had 1,000 illegitimate catties of meat from the incident. Qian Hongzong turned to Hu and asked, "What much does the largest cow weigh?" Hu responded, "No more than 300 catties." Qian Hongzong then responded, "Then, the only conclusion is that the investigating officer's accusations were false." He ordered the investigating officer punished. When Hu congratulated him on his intelligent ruling, he responded, "How did you know about this, Lord?" Hu, stuttering, responded, "Before your subject joined the army, I used to do this." However, Hu believed that Qian already knew of his past and was merely intending to embarrass him publicly (as being a butcher was not considered an honorable profession), and therefore was even more unhappy about the king, particularly because the king also repeatedly rebuked him over the situation with Li Ruyun.

Around new year 948, Qian Hongzong began to discuss with two officials that he felt he could trust, He Chengxun (何承訓) and Shuiqiu Zhaoquan (水丘昭券), on possibly expelling Hu from the headquarters. Shuiqiu thought it might be dangerous to do so due to Hu's hold on the army, and therefore Qian hesitated. He Chengxun, fearful that the news might leak, instead decided to leak it to Hu himself. One night, when Qian was holding a feast, Hu thought that Qian was intending to act against him then, and therefore gathered his soldiers and headed for the king's mansion. He surrounded the mansion and put the king under house arrest, and the issued an order in the king's name, claiming that the king had suffered a stroke and was therefore passing the throne to his younger brother Qian Hongchu. When he went to offer the throne to Qian Hongchu, Qian Hongchu agreed, on the condition that Qian Hongzong's life be spared. When Hu agreed, Qian Hongchu took the throne (as King Zhongyi).

== During Qian Hongchu's reign ==
In the aftermaths of the coup, Hu Jinsi killed Shuiqiu Zhaoquan and Qian Hongzong's uncle Fu Guangxuan (鄜光鉉). This caused his wife to remark, "It may be permissible to kill others. Shuiqiu Zhaoquan was a righteous gentleman. Why harm him?" Meanwhile, He Chengxun secretly suggested to Qian Hongchu that Hu and his party be slaughtered, but Qian Hongchu, both disgusted at He Chengxun's betrayal and fearful that the news might leak to Hu, instead had He Chengxun executed. He moved his brother, the deposed king Qian Hongzong, to their grandfather Qian Liu's old mansion at Yijin Base (衣錦軍, in modern Hangzhou), effectively under house arrest, and sent his trusted officer Xue Wen (薛溫) to guard the mansion. He secretly instructed Xue, "If there were to be unusual orders [(i.e., an order to kill Qian Hongzong)], it would not be out of my will. You should resist to the death."

Hu, meanwhile, was repeatedly trying to persuade Qian Hongchu to put Qian Hongzong to death, and Qian Hongchu resisted. Hu falsified a secret order to Xue, ordering Xue to kill Qian Hongzong, but Xue responded, "When your servant received his orders, he did not receive any such instructions, and he dares not to carry this out." Hu instead sent two assassins against Qian Hongzong, but Qian Hongzong discovered this and yelled for help; Xue then arrived with his soldiers and killed the assassins, and then reported this to Qian Hongchu, who was shocked but who responded, "That my brother remains alive is your accomplishment." Despite this, Qian Hongchu feared but remained cordial in his attitude toward Hu, who in turn became increasingly worried. Not long after, he suffered from a tumor on his back and died from it, and Qian Hongzong was able to escape further disaster.

== Notes and references ==
- Spring and Autumn Annals of the Ten Kingdoms, vol. 88.
- Zizhi Tongjian, vols. 283, 285, 287.
