= Chu Prefecture (Jiangsu) =

Historical administrative division in Jiangsu, China

Chuzhou or Chu Prefecture (楚州) was a zhou (prefecture) in imperial China seated in modern Huai'an, Jiangsu, China. It existed (intermittently) from 581 to 1228.

== Geography ==
The administrative region of Chuzhou in the Tang dynasty is in modern Jiangsu. It probably includes parts of modern:

- Under the administration of Huai'an:
  - Huai'an
  - Xuyi County
  - Jinhu County
  - Hongze County
- Under the administration of Yangzhou:
  - Baoying County
- Under the administration of Yancheng:
  - Jianhu County
