= Qian Hongzong =

King of Wuyue from 947 to 948

King Zhongxun of Wuyue 吳越忠遜王

King of Wuyue
- Reign: 3 July 947 – 12 February 948
- Predecessor: Qian Hongzuo
- Successor: Qian Hongchu
- Born: 928? Hangzhou, Wuyue
- Died: 971? Shaoxing, Wuyue
- Burial: in modern Keqiao District, Shaoxing
- Issue: Qian Weizhi (錢惟治); Qian Kun (錢昆); Qian Yi (錢易)
Names
- Qián Hóngzōng (錢弘倧), later changed to Qián Zōng (錢倧) in 960
Era dates
- Adopted the era name of Later Han: Tianfu (天福): 947–948
Posthumous name
- King Zhōngxùn (忠遜王, "faithful and humble")
- House: Qian
- Dynasty: Wuyue
- Father: Qian Yuanguan
- Mother: Lady Fu

Qian Hongzong (Chinese: 錢弘倧) (c. 928 – 971?), known as Qian Zong (錢倧) during Song, courtesy name Longdao (隆道), nickname Wanjin (萬金), also known by his posthumous name as King Zhongxun of Wuyue (吳越忠遜王), was the fourth king of Wuyue during the Five Dynasties and Ten Kingdoms period of China. He ruled for only seven months before being deposed by the general Hu Jinsi in a coup.

== Life ==
=== Early years ===
Qian Hongzong was probably born in 928. His father was Qian Chuanguan (later known as Qian Yuanguan, King Wenmu), who, as of 928, had been designated the heir to his father (Qian Hongzong's grandfather) Qian Liu (King Wusu), the founding king of Wuyue. His mother was Qian Chuanguan's concubine Lady Fu, who had previously given birth to Qian Chuanguan's oldest biological son (fifth son overall) Qian Hongzun. Qian Hongzong was Qian Chuanguan's seventh son (third biological). When Qian Hongzong was born, Qian Chuanguan dreamed of a man presenting him with a box of gold, and therefore nicknamed Qian Hongzong Wanjin ("10,000 catties of gold").

Early in his career, Qian Hongzong served as an officer of the Wuyue royal guard corps, and carried the honorary title of acting Sikong (司空, one of the Three Excellencies). In 944, during the reign of his older brother Qian Hongzuo (King Zhongxian), who had succeeded Qian Yuanguan, he was sent to Yue Prefecture (越州, in modern Shaoxing, Zhejiang) to serve as the comforter of the eastern headquarters (i.e., Yue), and was given the honorary title of acting Taiwei (太尉, also one of the Three Excellencies). In 947, Qian Hongzuo recalled him to Wuyue's capital Qiantang to serve as chancellor. Later in the year, Qian Hongzuo died, and, in his will, named Qian Hongzong the military governor (Jiedushi) of Wuyue's two main circuits, Zhenhai (鎮海, headquartered at Qiantang) and Zhendong (鎮東, headquartered at Yue), as well as the honorary chancellor title of Shizhong (侍中). Shortly after, Qian Hongzong took the throne. For the time being, he used the Huitong era name of the Khitan Liao dynasty, as Qian Hongzuo had previously submitted to Liao as a vassal.

=== Reign ===
After Qian Hongzong took the throne, he recalled his younger brother Qian Hongchu, who was then serving as the prefect of Tai Prefecture (台州, in modern Taizhou, Zhejiang), to Qiantang, to serve as acting chancellor. Shortly after, the warlord Li Da, who controlled Weiwu Circuit (威武, headquartered in modern Fuzhou, Fujian), arrived from Weiwu to pay homage to him. Qian Hongzong granted Li Da an honorary chancellor title, and gave him a new name, Li Ruyun. Li, fearing that Qian Hongzong would detain him at Qiantang, bribed the powerful royal guard general Hu Jinsi, and Hu spoke on his behalf, asking Qian Hongzong to return Li to Weiwu. Qian Hongzong agreed. Shortly after, Li, who was beginning to have conflicts with the Wuyue general Bao Xiurang (鮑修讓), whose army was stationed at Fu to both help him defend the city and watch his moves, and was plotting to assassinate Bao and surrender the city to Wuyue's neighbor Southern Tang. When Bao realized this, he ambushed Li and slaughtered Li's family.

In winter 947, Later Han's emperor Liu Zhiyuan, who had taken over the Central Plains after the Liao state's withdrawal, bestowed on Qian Hongzong the titles of Generalissimo of the Southeast Armies (東南兵馬都元帥, Dongnan Bingma Du Yuanshuai), military governor of Zhendong and Zhenhai, Zhongshu Ling (中書令), and Prince of Wuyue. It was only at this point that Qian Hongzong accepted Liu as his lord and started to use Later Han's era name. At a later point, Later Han bestowed the greater title of king (Guowang (國王), compared to simply Wang (王, "prince")) on Qian Hongzong, although it was not clear when. As king, Qian Hongzong was said to be strict, as he believed that Qian Hongzuo was overly lenient such that the generals had too much power, effectively depriving the king of ability to make decisions. After he became king, he executed three administrators of Zhenhai and Zhendong that he considered to be abusing power.

Hu continued to have substantial power in the governance of the state, drawing Qian Hongzong's displeasure, and the king considered sending him out to be a prefect of a prefecture, but Hu declined. Nevertheless, from this point on, Hu's suggestions were often met with rebuke, such that Hu built a small shrine to Qian Hongzuo in his home, offering sacrifices there and shedding bitter tears. There was one occasion when Qian Hongzong was reviewing the troops and announced an award for them. Hu thought that the award was excessive and argued against it, but the young king angrily threw his pen in to the water and stated, "My wealth is to be shared with the soldiers. How is it that there can be a limit to that?" There was also once an incident where a civilian was accused of slaughtering a cow privately (i.e., without paying the taxes for doing so). The investigating officer claimed that the civilian had 1,000 illegitimate catties of meat from the incident. Qian Hongzong turned to Hu and asked, "What much does the largest cow weigh?" Hu responded, "No more than 300 catties." Qian Hongzong then responded, "Then, the only conclusion is that the investigating officer's accusations were false." He ordered the investigating officer punished. When Hu congratulated him on his intelligent ruling, he responded, "How did you know about this, Lord?" Hu, stuttering, responded, "Before your subject joined the army, I used to do this." However, Hu believed that Qian already knew of his past and was merely intending to embarrass him publicly (as being a butcher was not considered an honorable profession), and therefore was even more unhappy about the king, particularly because the king also repeatedly rebuked him over the situation with Li Ruyun.

Around new year 948, Qian Hongzong began to discuss with two officials whom he felt he could trust, He Chengxun (何承訓) and Shuiqiu Zhaoquan (水丘昭券), possibly expelling Hu from the headquarters. Shuiqiu thought it might be dangerous to do so due to Hu's hold on the army, and therefore Qian hesitated. He Chengxun, fearful that the news might leak, instead decided to leak it to Hu himself. One night, when Qian was holding a feast, Hu thought that Qian was intending to act against him then, and therefore gathered his soldiers and headed for the king's mansion. He surrounded the mansion and put the king under house arrest, and the issued an order in the king's name, claiming that the king had suffered a stroke and was therefore passing the throne to his younger brother Qian Hongchu. When he went to offer the throne to Qian Hongchu, Qian Hongchu agreed, on the condition that Qian Hongzong's life be spared. When Hu agreed, Qian Hongchu took the throne (as King Zhongyi). As part of the coup, Hu killed Shuiqiu and Qian Hongzong's uncle (Lady Fu's brother) Fu Guangxuan (鄜光鉉).

=== Later years ===
Qian Hongchu moved Qian Hongzong to their grandfather Qian Liu's old mansion at Yijin Base (衣錦軍, in modern Hangzhou), effectively under house arrest, and sent his trusted officer Xue Wen (薛溫) to guard the mansion. He secretly instructed Xue, "If there were to be unusual orders [(i.e., an order to kill Qian Hongzong)], it would not be out of my will. You should resist to the death."

Hu, meanwhile, was repeatedly trying to persuade Qian Hongchu to put Qian Hongzong to death, and Qian Hongchu resisted. Hu falsified a secret order to Xue, ordering Xue to kill Qian Hongzong, but Xue responded, "When your servant received his orders, he did not receive any such instructions, and he dares not to carry this out." Hu instead sent two assassins against Qian Hongzong, but Qian Hongzong discovered this and yelled for help; Xue then arrived with his soldiers and killed the assassins, and then reported this to Qian Hongchu, who was shocked but who responded, "That my brother remains alive is your accomplishment." Despite this, Qian Hongchu feared but remained cordial in his attitude toward Hu, who in turn became increasingly worried. Not long after, he suffered from a tumor on his back and died from it, and Qian Hongzong was able to escape further disaster.

In 951, Qian Hongchu moved Qian Hongzong to Yue Prefecture. Qian Hongchu further built a palace, along with gardens, for Qian Hongzong, hoping to please him, and supplied him with everything. Soon after arriving at Yue, Qian Hongzong had his first son, whom Qian Hongchu favored greatly, and therefore adopted as a son and named (in consistency with his own sons, who all had the character of Wei (惟) in their names) Qian Weizhi (錢惟治). (He would later have at least two more sons, Qian Kun (錢昆) and Qian Yi (錢易).) On holidays, Qian Hongzong would often put on the robe of a Taoist priest (Taoist monk) and take concubines and musicians to go up the mountain; he would also often beat drums loudly. When the guards reported this to Qian Hongchu, Qian Hongchu did not mind, stating, "My brother is troubled by his lack of duties. He will not be happy unless he can beat drums." Qian Hongzong (who, in his last years, would have his name changed to Qian Zong to observe naming taboo with Song's Emperor Taizu's father Zhao Hongyin) would die 20 years after being moved to Yue.

== Personal information ==
- Father
  - Qian Yuanguan
- Mother
  - Lady Fu, the Lady of Lu
- Children
  - Qian Weizhi (錢惟治), later adopted by Qian Chu, posthumously created the Prince of Pengcheng by Emperor Zhenzong of Song
  - Qian Kun (錢昆)
  - Qian Yi (錢易)

== Notes and references ==
Regnal titles
Preceded by Qian Hongzuo (King Zongxian)	King of Wuyue; 947–948	Succeeded by Qian Hongchu (King Zhongyi)
