= Qian Hongzuo =

King of Wuyue from 941 to 947

King Chengzong of Wuyue 吳越成宗

King of Wuyue
- Reign: 26 September 941 – 22 June 947
- Predecessor: Qian Yuanguan
- Successor: Qian Hongzong
- Born: 14 August 928; Hangzhou, Wuyue
- Died: 22 June 947 (aged 18); Hangzhou, Wuyue
- Wife: Lady Du; Consort Yang
- Issue: Qian Yu (錢昱); Qian Yu (錢郁)
Names
- Qián Hóngzuǒ (錢弘佐)
Era dates
- Adopted the era names of Later Jin: Tianfu (天福): 941–944; Kaiyun (開運): 944 –946; Adopted the era name of Later Han: Tianfu (天福): 947
Posthumous name
- King Zhōngxiàn (忠獻王, "faithful and wise")
Temple name
- Chéngzōng (成宗)
- House: Qian
- Dynasty: Wuyue
- Father: Qian Yuanguan
- Mother: Lady Xu Xinyue

Qian Hongzuo
- Traditional Chinese: 錢弘佐
- Simplified Chinese: 钱弘佐
Transcriptions
Standard Mandarin
- Hanyu Pinyin: Qián Hóngzuǒ
- IPA: [tɕʰjɛ̌n xʊ̌ŋtswò]
Yue: Cantonese
- Yale Romanization: Chín Wàhng-jo
- Jyutping: Cin^{2} Wang^{4}-zo^{3}
- IPA: [tsʰin˧˥ wɐŋ˩ tsɔ˧]

Qian Hongzuo (Chinese: 錢弘佐; 14 August 928 – 22 June 947), courtesy name Yuanyou (元祐), also known by his temple name as King Chengzong of Wuyue (吳越成宗), was the third king of Wuyue during the Five Dynasties and Ten Kingdoms period of China.

== Life ==
=== Early life ===
Qian Hongzuo was born in 928. He was the sixth son of father Qian Chuanguan (King Wenmu), who was then still serving under his father (Qian Hongzun's grandfather), Wuyue's first king Qian Liu (King Wusu), as the acting military governor (Jiedushi) of Wuyue's two main circuits, Zhenhai (鎮海, headquartered at Wuyue's capital Hang Prefecture (杭州, in modern Hangzhou, Zhejiang)) and Zhendong (鎮東, headquartered in modern Shaoxing, Zhejiang). His mother was Qian Chuanguan's concubine Lady Xu Xinyue. While he was ranked as Qian Chuanguan's sixth son, traditional histories heavily implied that he was the second-born in terms of Qian Chuanguan's biological sons, as they emphasized that Qian Chuanguan and his wife Lady Ma were sonless and that, therefore, Qian Chuanguan was sonless into his 30s because Qian Liu had forbidden officials from taking concubines, until Lady Ma personally pleaded for an exemption for Qian Chuanguan due to that reason — and listing Qian Chuanguan's fifth son Qian Hongzun and Qian Hongzuo among the biological sons born from Qian Chuanguan's concubines, while omitting their older brothers Qian Hongzhuan (錢弘僎), Qian Hongxuan (錢弘儇), Qian Hongyou (錢弘侑), and Qian Hong'an (錢弘侒), although only Qian Hongyou was explicitly stated to be an adoptive son.

After Qian Chuanguan succeeded to the throne after Qian Liu's death in 932 (and changed his name to Qian Yuanguan), Qian Hongzun was initially designated the heir apparent. As his sons grew older, Qian Yuanguan built a mansion of the heir apparent for Qian Hongzun. Shortly before Qian Hongzun was to move into the mansion, there was a time when Qian Hongzuo and Qian Hongzun were gambling with each other, and Qian Hongzun made a comment in jest, "The Lord King is building an office for me. I am willing to gamble you for it." When they then played dice, however, Qian Hongzuo won, causing Qian Hongzun to lose his composure. Qian Hongzuo, without losing composure as well, stated, "When you, fifth brother, enter the headquarters, I, Hongzuo, will receive the seal of a general." He bowed to Qian Hongzun, but Qian Hongzun was not pleased and left immediately.

Qian Hongzun died in 940. Qian Hongzuo was thereafter made the deputy military governors of Zhenhai and Zhendong, effectively being designated the heir. In 941, Qian Yuanguan was deathly ill. After a conversation with his officer Zhang De'an (章德安) in which he toyed with the idea of passing the throne to an older member of his clan because of Qian Hongzuo's youth, he ultimately decided on entrusting Qian Hongzuo to Zhang. He died shortly after. As there were rumors that another officer, Dai Yun (戴惲), whose wife was a relative to Qian Hongyou's wet nurse, was planning on supporting Qian Hongyou to succeed Qian Yuanguan, Zhang initially kept Qian Yuanguan's death a secret; rather, he had his soldiers ambush, arrest, and kill Dai, and then had Qian Hongyou demoted to commoner rank and changed in name back to his birth name of Sun. Zhang then led the other officials and officers in announcing Qian Yuanguan's will, naming Qian Hongzuo the military governor of Zhenhai and Zhendong. Qian Hongzuo shortly after took the position, apparently, not only of military governor, but also king.

=== Reign ===
At the start of his reign, Qian Hongzuo designated the chancellor Cao Zhongda as regent. Shortly after, when the soldiers complained about unevenness of rewards to them, the officers were unable to quell their discontent, requiring Cao to personally speak to them and comfort them before the discontent faded.

As king, Qian Hongzuo was said to be mild-tempered and respectful, studious, diligent, and capable of discovering hidden evils. Once, upon hearing that the state had 10 years worth of excess food storage, he decided to exempt the people of taxes for three years. Around the new year 942, Shi Jingtang the emperor of Later Jin, to whom he was formally a vassal, formally created him the King of Wuyue, the military governor of Zhenhai and Zhendong, and honorary chancellor with the title of Zhongshu Ling (中書令).

By fall 943, however, the commander of the headquarter corps, Kan Fan (闞璠), was said to be so dominant at Qian's court such that, even though Zhang De'an and another officer, Li Wenqing (李文慶), tried to counterbalance his power, they could not do so, and Zhang and Li ended up being sent out to be prefects of Chu (處州, in modern Lishui, Zhejiang) and Mu (睦州, in modern Hangzhou), respectively, such that Kan and Hu Jinsi became particularly dominant after that. Later in the year, Qian married the daughter of the senior general Yang Renquan as his wife. (He had a prior wife, a Lady Du, but she appeared to have died before his becoming king. Consort Yuan herself, though, apparently did not live a long time after the marriage, although when she died is unclear.)

By 944, Wuyue's southern neighbor Min was deeply caught in civil war, with the general Zhu Wenjin (having earlier assassinated the emperor Wang Yanxi and taken control of the capital Fu Prefecture (福州, in modern Fuzhou, Fujian)) claiming the title of Emperor of Min, battling Wang Yanxi's brother Wang Yanzheng (in control of Jian Prefecture (建州, in modern Nanping, Fujian), who claimed the title of Emperor of Yin. Zhu sought aid from Wuyue and sent brother(s) and son(s) to serve as hostages in that effort, but there was no record of any responses by Qian. After Zhu was later assassinated, Wang Yanzheng briefly took control of all of the Min realm and reclaimed the title of Emperor of Min, but soon the general Li Renda led a revolt against him at Fu. Li Renda established friendly relations with Wuyue, as Wang Yanzheng later also attempted to do in seeking aid from Wuyue when Jian Prefecture came under the attack of Min's (and Wuyue's) northwestern neighbor Southern Tang. Before Wuyue could intervene at all, however, Jian fell to Southern Tang, ending Min, and Southern Tang, at least nominally, took over all of the former Min realm, although Li Renda, while formally a Southern Tang vassal, continued to control Fu and the surrounding area.

By late 945, Qian was said to have trusted the wicked officer Cheng Zhaoyue (程昭悅), who had previously been a wealthy merchant who was able to become an officer by ingratiating Kan and Du Zhaoda (杜昭達), a nephew to the deceased Lady Du. Kan became irritated at the close association between Qian and Cheng, and when Cheng tried to appease Kan by apologizing to him, Kan made him more fearful by stating, "I wanted to kill you at first. Now that you are showing remorse, I will not do so." Cheng thereafter conspired with Hu, and had Qian issue orders making Kan and Hu the prefects of Ming (明州, in modern Ningbo, Zhejiang) and Hu (湖州, in modern Huzhou, Zhejiang) respectively. Kan initially wanted to refuse the order, but Hu persuaded him to accept. Cheng then falsely accused Kan and Du of wanting to support Qian's cousin Qian Renjun (錢仁俊) to be the new king, and Qian Hongzuo then put Kan and Du to death and put Qian Renjun under house arrest. Cheng used this opportunity to accuse many officers of being in league with Kan and Du, and it was said that some 100 were either killed or exiled.

By 946, Southern Tang's emperor Li Jing, unable to get Li Renda to yield actual control of the Fu region by himself, sent the official Chen Jue to Fu to try to persuade Li Renda to do so. When Li Renda refused, Chen, initially without Li Jing's orders, launched an army and attacked Fu. Li Renda requested aid from Wuyue, and while most officials and generals at Qian Hongzuo's court opposed intervention, Qian himself decided that he needed to aid Li Renda, and sent the generals Zhang Yun (張筠) and Zhao Chengtai (趙承泰) with 30,000 men to aid Li Renda. Initially, the joint forces of Wuyue and Li Renda were unable to stop the Southern Tang attack, and Fu appeared in danger of falling.

In spring 947, Qian, working with the officers Shuiqiu Zhaoquan (水丘昭券) and Chu Wen (儲溫), ambushed and killed Cheng (whose power he had become apprehensive about). He then released Qian Renjun from house arrest.

In summer 947, Qian sent another detachment, commanded by Yu An (余安), to aid Fu, but initially was unable to land. The Southern Tang general Feng Yanlu, believing that allowing the Wuyue army to land would allow them to be conclusively destroyed, decided to allow them to do so. Once the Wuyue army landed, however, they aggressively attacked the Southern Tang sieging army, and the Southern Tang forces collapsed. The siege was lifted, and Zhang and Yu thereafter returned to Wuyue. Qian Hongzuo sent the general Bao Xiurang (鮑修讓) to command a Wuyue detachment to be stationed at Fu. Simultaneously, he made his younger brother Qian Hongzong chancellor — which, in light of later events, appeared to be intending to designate Qian Hongzong as heir. (By this point, Later Jin had fallen to the Khitan Liao state, and Qian Hongzuo had apparently formally submitted to Liao's Emperor Taizong as a vassal, although he also apparently submitted to the Later Jin general Liu Zhiyuan, who then established Later Han in rivalry to Liao, as well.)

Qian Hongzuo died in fall 947. He left a will designating Qian Hongzong as the military governor of Zhenhai and Zhendong, and Qian Hongzong thereafter took over control of the state.

== Family ==
- Father
  - Qian Yuanguan (King Wenmu)
- Mother
  - Lady Xu Xinyue
- Wives
  - Lady Du
  - Consort Yang
- Children
  - Qian Yu (錢昱) (943-999), posthumously created the Marquess of Fushui by Emperor Zhenzong of Song
  - Qian Yu (錢郁, note different character than his brother), posthumously created the Marquess of Xiping by Song

== Notes and references ==
Regnal titles
Preceded by Qian Yuanguan (King Wenmu)	King of Wuyue; 941–947	Succeeded by Qian Hongzong (King Zhongxun)
Preceded by Shi Chonggui of Later Jin / Li Jing of Southern Tang	Sovereign of China (Northeastern Fujian) (de jure); 946–947; With: Shi Chonggui of Later Jin	Succeeded by Qian Hongzong (King Zhongxun)
