= Qian (surname) =

Chinese surname

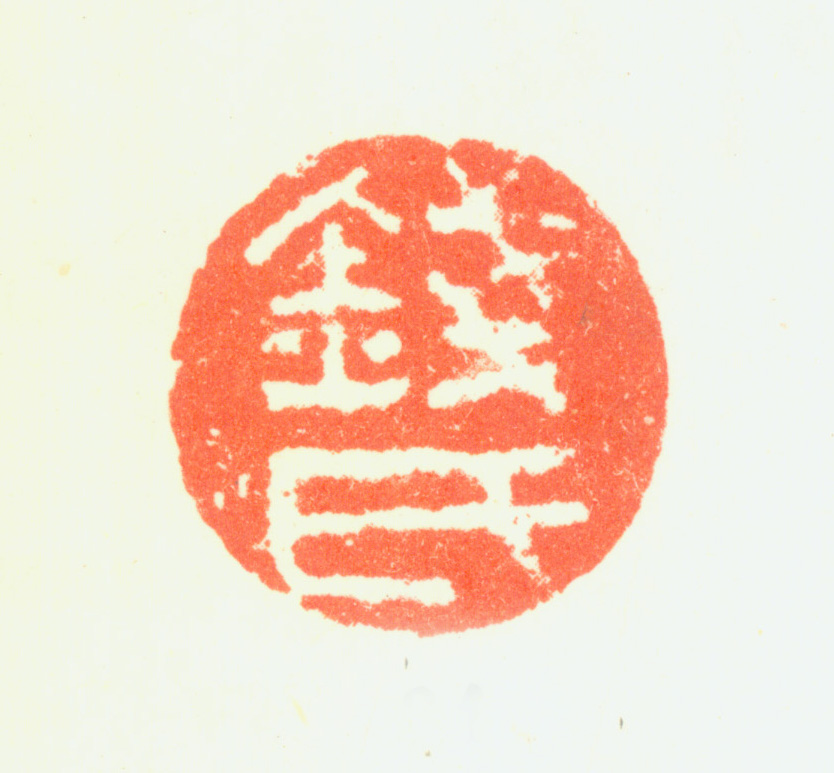
- A Chinese chop reading 錢氏 ("Qian family")
- Traditional Chinese: 錢
- Simplified Chinese: 钱
- Literal meaning: Money, particularly the cash
Transcriptions
Standard Mandarin
- Hanyu Pinyin: Qián
- Wade–Giles: Ch'ien²
Wu
- Romanization: Zee [ʑ̊i]

Qian, also variously spelt Ch'ien, Chien, Chin, Tsien, and (from its Wu pronunciation) Zee, is a common Chinese surname. It is particularly common in Eastern China, where members of the family ruled from Hangzhou as kings of Wuyue in the 10th-century interregnum between the Tang and Song dynasties. In 2008, Qian was the 96th most common surname in mainland China, shared by 2.2 million people, with the greatest concentration of Qians being in southeast Jiangsu.

== Character ==
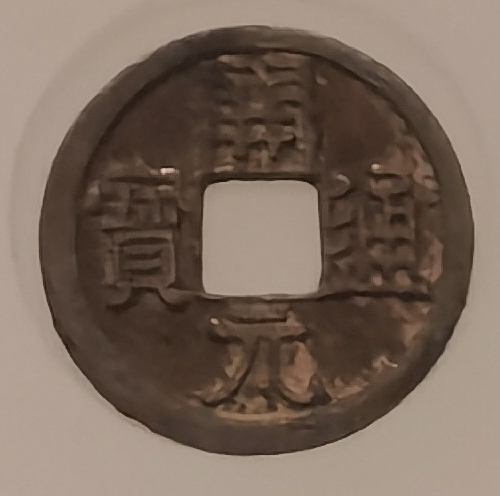
A copper "Kaiyuan Tongbao" cash (qian) minted by the Wuyue Kingdom

The traditional character for the name 錢 is a phono-semantic compound formed by a 金 (copper, metal, gold) radical on the left and 戔—a character now pronounced jiān and meaning "to harm", "tiny", or "accumulating" in different contexts but used at the time for its closer pronunciation in Old Chinese—on the right. Jiān itself was an ideograph taking its meaning from Chinese dagger-axes (戈, gē) used originally in opposition and later in conjunction. The simplified form of the character 钱 uses a more stylized 钅 on the left and a new glyph 戋 on the right that adds an extra line to 戈 to indicate its previous duplication.

The name literally means "money" but previously particularly referred to the cash, a low-denomination coin made from copper, bronze, and other base metals that was used in imperial and early Republican China. Less commonly, the word is used metonymically for expense, property, value, etc.; for small round discs similar to the coins; and for the mace, the small traditional unit of mass equivalent to the notional weight of the coins after Tang-era monetary reforms. Still less commonly, it is used for small metal farm tools, particularly spades (cf. spade money, once common in China under the Zhou).

== History ==
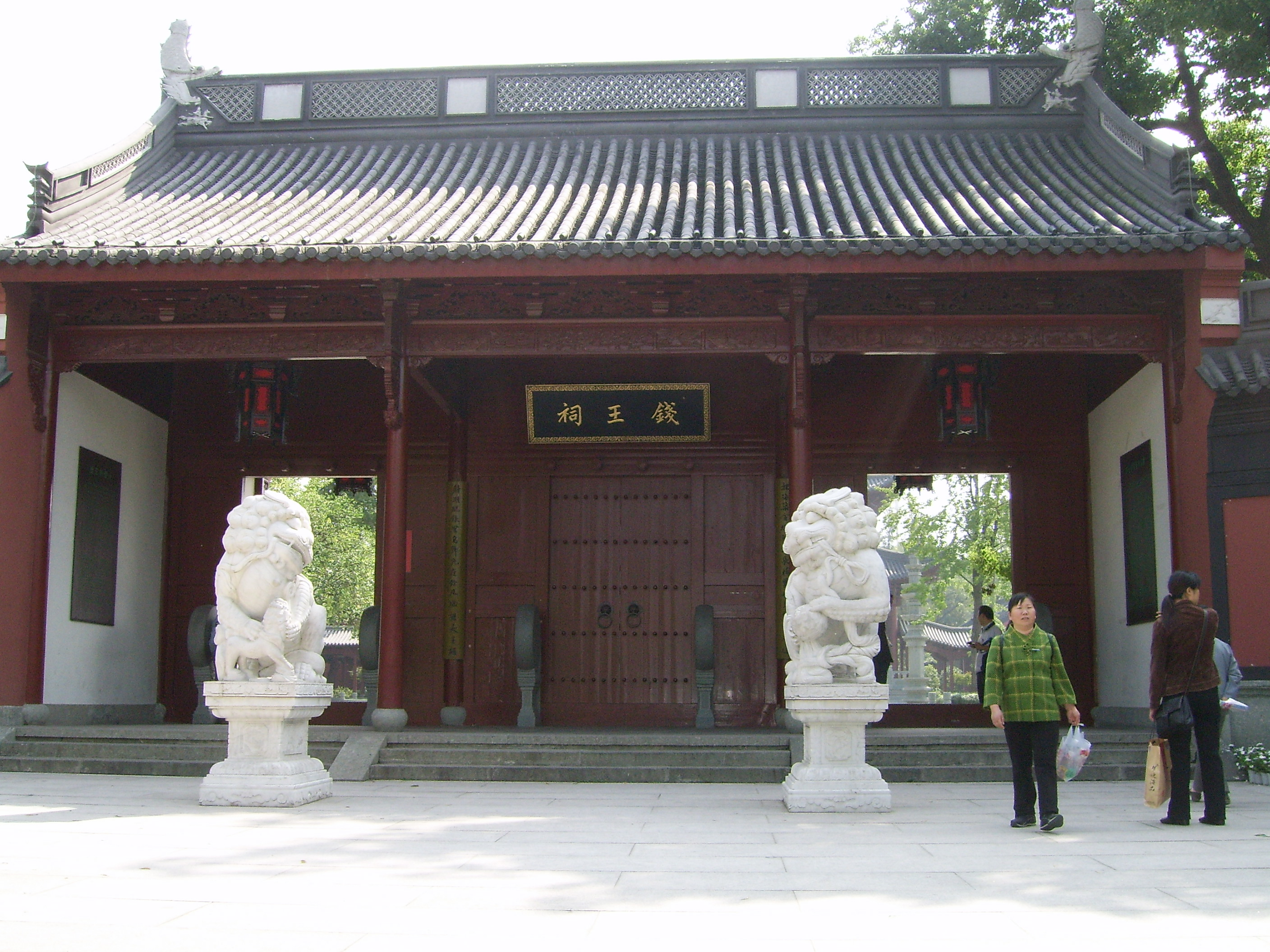
Temple of the Qian Kings, a shrine to the kings of Wuyue beside West Lake in central Hangzhou, China

According to legends related in the Song-era Tongzhi encyclopedia, the Qian surname supposedly originated from a Zhou official named Fu who worked in the royal treasury, then known as the Qianfu (錢府, "Money Office"). His descendants adopted the surname from his office and title. The legend further claimed that Fu had been a descendant of Pengzu, a long-lived and extremely virile "marquis" of Dapeng in present-day Jiangsu under the Shang, who was himself a descendant of Zhuanxu, one of the Five Emperors of remote antiquity sometimes conflated with the North Star and its gods, who was himself reckoned a grandson of the Yellow Emperor, the culture hero credited with beginning Chinese civilization. Dynasts and residents of Peng, the Qian family were thought to have originally congregated around its capital Xiapi, present-day Pizhou in Jiangsu. The surname spread from there but remains most common in Jiangnan, the region of eastern China around the Yangtze River Delta and Hangzhou Bay.

From ad 907–960, Qian Liu and his descendants ruled the largely independent Kingdom of Wuyue during the interregnum between the Tang and Song dynasties. Qian Liu had many, many sons by many wives and concubines and posted them to prominent positions across different parts of his realm, greatly expanding the prominence of the surname across a territory comprising present-day Zhejiang, Shanghai, southern Jiangsu, and northern Fujian. Following the submission of Qian Chu to the Song in 978, he and some members of his immediate family were removed to the Song capital Bianjing, now Kaifeng in Henan. Considered loyal and capable, the family remained prominent at the Song court for generations. This period spread the family through central and northern China as well. The Chinese classic list of the Hundred Family Surnames was composed under the Song. As the royal dynasty of the successful and loyal realm of Wuyue, Qian placed second in the list only behind Zhao, the surname of the imperial Song dynasty itself. Further, almost all the other families in the list's first line—Sun, Zhou, Wu, Zheng, and Wang—seem to have been given their placement as the families of Qian Chu's wives in their order of status.

== Notable people ==
=== Pre-modern ===
- Qian Qi (錢起/钱起; born 710–782), Tang dynasty poet
- The royal family of Wuyue (吳越/吴越), especially:
  - Qian Chu (錢俶/钱俶; born 929–988), last king
  - Qian Liu (錢鏐/钱镠; born 852–932), founder
- Qian Qianyi (錢謙益/钱谦益; born 1582–1664), Ming dynasty official and author
- Qian Weiyan (錢惟演/钱惟演; born 962–1034), Song Chancellor, Duke
- Empress Qian, wife of Emepror Zhengtong

=== Modern ===
- Roger Y. Tsien (錢永健/钱永健; –2016), Nobel Prize winner
- Chin Harn Tong, Hainamese politician
- Collin Chee (錢昶均), businessman, actor and national football team assistant manager
- Sung Shu Chien (錢崇澍/钱崇澍; born 1883–1965), botanist
- Ch'ien Mu (錢穆/钱穆; born 1895–1990), historian
- Qian Baojun (錢寶鈞/钱宝钧; born 1907–1996), polymer chemist and educator, co-founder of Donghua University
- Chin Harn Tong (錢翰琮/钱翰琮; born 1937), Singaporean politician
- Chin Ka-lok (錢嘉樂/钱嘉乐; born 1965), Hong Kong actor and action choreographer
- Fredrick Chien (錢復/钱复; born 1935), Republic of China politician, diplomat
- Qian Changzhao (錢昌照/钱昌照; born 1899–1988), industrialist and politician
- Qian Liren (錢李仁/钱李仁; born 1924), People's Republic of China politician, diplomat
- Qian Nairong (錢乃榮/ 钱乃荣; born 1945), linguist
- Qian Nancy (錢楠筠/钱楠筠; born 1978), economist, Northwestern University Professor
- Qian Nengxun (钱能训/錢能訓; born 1869–1924), Republic of China politician
- Qian Qichen (錢其琛/钱其琛; born 1928–2017), Foreign Minister of the People's Republic of China
- Qian Sanqiang (錢三強/钱三强; born 1913–1992), nuclear physicist
- Chien Shih-Liang (錢思亮/钱思亮; born 1908–1983), chemist and educator
- Qian Weichang (錢偉長/钱伟长; born 1913–2010), physicist and mathematician
- Qian Xingcun (錢杏邨/钱杏村; born 1900–1977), Chinese writer and literary critic
- Qian Xiuling (錢秀玲/钱秀玲; born 1912–2008), Chinese emigrant to Belgium who helped save hundreds of Belgians from execution by the Nazis
- Qian Xuantong (錢玄同/钱玄同; born 1887–1939), linguist
- Qian Xuesen (錢學森/钱学森; born 1911–2009), rocket scientist and physicist
- Qian Ying (錢瑛/钱瑛; born 1903–1973), People's Republic of China politician
- Qian Ying (錢英/钱英) Chinese politician
- Qian Qihu (錢七虎/钱七虎; born 1937), military engineer
- Qian Yunlu (錢運彔/钱运录; born 1944), People's Republic of China politician
- Qian Wen-yuan ( (錢文源/钱文源; born 1936–2003)), Chinese-American physicist and historian
- Qian Zhengying (錢正英/钱正英; born 1923–2022), hydrologist, People's Republic of China politician
- Qian Zhijun (錢志君/钱志君; born 1987), actor and subject of the "Little Fatty" internet meme
- Qian Zhimin (born 1960) (錢智民/钱智民; born 1960), former President of China National Nuclear Corporation
- Qian Zhongshu (錢鍾書/钱锺书; born 1910–1998), scholar and writer
- Qian Zhuangfei (錢壯飛/钱壮飞; born 1895–1935), Chinese intelligence agent
- Robert Tienwen Chien (錢天問/钱天问; born 1931–1983), American Computer Scientist, University of Illinois Professor, Director of Coordinated Science Laboratory
- Ronny Chieng (錢信伊/钱信伊; born 1984/1985), Malaysian Chinese standup comedian and actor
- Shu Chien (錢煦/钱煦; born 1931), biological scientist and engineer
- Tsien Tsuen-hsuin (錢存訓/钱存训; born 1909–2015), sinologist, University of Chicago professor
- Qian Min (錢敏/钱敏; born 1927–2019), mathematical physicist, winner of the 11th Hua Luogeng Prize in Mathematics
- Joe Z. Tsien (錢卓/钱卓; born 1962), Neuroscientist and geneticist, the pioneer of Cre/lox neurogenetics and the creator of smart mouse Doogie. He is also known for his Theory of Connectivity regarding the basic logic of brain computation and the origin of intelligence.
- Chang-Kan Chien (錢昌淦/钱昌淦; born 1904–1940), engineer, builder of Hangzhou bridge, bridges on the Burma Road during WWII. Was killed by Japanese fighter planes during the war.
- Qian Kun (錢錕/钱锟; born 1996), singer, member of South Korean group NCT and its Chinese sub-unit WayV (威神V)

== See also ==
- All Wikipedia pages beginning with Qian
- Temple of the Qian Kings in Hangzhou, China
