= Queen Yu (Wuyue) =

Second wife of Qian Chu (c. 976 – 978)

Queen Yu (俞王妃) was the second wife of Qian Chu (King Zhongyi), the fifth and final king of Wuyue of the Chinese Five Dynasties and Ten Kingdoms Period.

== Biography ==
Very little is known about Queen Yu in history, including when or where she was born. Qian Chu's first wife Sun Taizhen died in 976, so he must have married (or elevated from concubinage) Queen Yu as his queen after that time, but it is not clear when, nor is it completely clear that it was before Wuyue was absorbed by its suzerain Song in 978. Qian Chu, after Wuyue's absorption into Song, carried a number of noble titles in succession — King of Huaihai, King of Hannan, King of Nanyang, Prince of Xu, and Prince of Deng (and was eventually posthumously created the King of Qin), but it is unclear what titles Queen Yu carried during that period. After Qian Chu's death in 988, Qian Chu's oldest son Qian Weijun and other sons submitted much of his wealth to then-reigning Emperor Taizong of Song, and it was said that part of the tribute was from Queen Yu — including gold, silver, rhinoceros horns, jade belts, and crystal Buddha statues. There was no subsequent historical reference to her.

== Notes and references ==
- Spring and Autumn Annals of the Ten Kingdoms, vol. 83.

Chinese nobility
Preceded by Queen Sun Taizhen	Lady consort of Wuyue; 976?–978	Succeeded by None (state absorbed)
Preceded by Queen Sun Taizhen	Wife to the Sovereign of China (Zhejiang/Shanghai/Southeastern Jiangsu/Northeastern Fujian); 976?–978	Succeeded by Empress Song of Song
