= Sun Taizhen =

Wife of Chinese king (died 976 CE)

Sun Taizhen (Chinese: 孫太真) (died 976) was the first wife of Qian Chu (King Zhongyi), the fifth and final king of Wuyue of the Chinese Five Dynasties and Ten Kingdoms period.

== Background ==
It is not known when Sun Taizhen was born, but it is known that she came from the Wuyue capital Qiantang (錢塘, in modern Hangzhou, Zhejiang). The historical records did not state her heritage, but it is known that she had at least one younger brother, Sun Chengyou (孫承祐), who would later become a prominent general for Wuyue (and later, for Song dynasty). She was said to be elegant, serious, intelligent, and wise. She was said to be proper and humble in her dealings with both her relatives by blood and by marriage. She was also said to be studious, being able to understand the Mao edition of the Classic of Poetry and the Lu edition of the Analects. It is not known when she married Qian Hongchu (who later changed his name to Qian Chu) — whether it was before or after he became king in 948 — but she was said to be already "serving" him in her youth, suggesting that they were married early.

== Queen consort ==
Around new year 948, Qian Hongchu took the throne after his brother and predecessor, Qian Hongzong, was overthrown in a coup led by the general Hu Jinsi. Later in 948, Liu Chengyou, the emperor of Later Han, to which Wuyue was a vassal, created Qian Hongchu the King of Wuyue, and, presumably, at that time or shortly after, created Sun Taizhen a lady. She was said to be frugal and did not wear elaborate jewelry except at feasts. Later, during Later Han's successor state Later Zhou, she was given the title of Lady Xiande (i.e., "worthy and virtuous") of Wuyue. In 955, she gave birth to Qian Hongchu's first son, Qian Weijun.

In 972, by which time Later Zhou had been succeeded by Song, Song's Emperor Taizu gave Lady Sun the greater title of Lady Xiande Shunmu (i.e., "worthy, virtuous, obedient, and concordant") of Wuyue. When Qian Hongchu (who had changed his name to Qian Chu by this point to observe naming taboo for Emperor Taizu's father Zhao Hongyin), as a Song vassal, attacked Wuyue's northwestern neighbor Jiangnan's Chang Prefecture (常州, in modern Changzhou, Jiangsu) in 974, Lady Sun stayed at the capital Qiantang to oversee it. She frequently visited the generals who remained and the family members of the generals who followed Qian Chu on the campaign, to comfort them, and it was said that the people obeyed her as they did the king.

Jiangnan fell in 975, and in 976, Qian Chu, whose Wuyue realm was now directly contiguous with Song proper, decided to go to the Song capital Kaifeng to pay homage to Emperor Taizu. Lady Sun and Qian Weijun went with him. Emperor Taizu gave Qian Chu great honors, and as part of honoring Qian Chu, created Lady Sun the queen of Wuyue. When they were departing Kaifeng, Qian Chu offered a tribute of gold coins to the Song emperor, and Queen Sun offered a tribute of gold vessels to Song's Empress Song. Queen Sun died in late 976.

== Notes and references ==
- Spring and Autumn Annals of the Ten Kingdoms, vol. 83.
- Xu Zizhi Tongjian, vols. 8, 9.

Chinese nobility
Preceded by Consort Yang	Lady consort of Wuyue; 947–976	Succeeded by Queen Yu
Preceded by Consort Yang	Wife to the Sovereign of China (Zhejiang/Shanghai/Southeastern Jiangsu); 947–976	Succeeded by Queen Yu
Preceded by Empress Feng of Later Jin	Wife to the Sovereign of China (Northeastern Fujian); 947–976	Succeeded by Queen Yu
