= Jinhui dialect =

Wu Chinese dialect

- Dônđäc
- 偒傣
- Pronunciation: [ˀɟɪ̃˦ ve˥˧ fɒ̃˦ ɦi˥˧]
- Native to: China
- Region: Jinhui, Fengxian, Shanghai
- Ethnicity: Han Chinese
- Native speakers: 100,000 (2012)
- Language family: Sino-Tibetan: Sinitic; Wu; Taihu; Suzhou–Shanghai–Jiaxing / Shanghai; Jinhui dialect

Language codes
- ISO 639-3: –
- Glottolog: None

The Jinhui dialect (Chinese: 金汇方言; pinyin: Jīnhuì fāngyán), also known as Dônđäc (Chinese: 偒傣; pinyin: Dàngdǎi), is a dialect of Wu Chinese spoken in the town of Jinhui, China in Shanghai's suburban Fengxian District. It has about 100,000 native speakers. Jinhui is located near the border of the ancient states of Wu and Yue during the Spring and Autumn period. Like other Wu dialects, Dônđäc has preserved many special features of the Old Yue language.

Dônđäc has 20 oral vowel qualities, plus many nasal and rhotic ones. According to a Fudan University study that was published in the journal Science, Dônđäc has the largest oral vowel quality inventory in the world (phonemically speaking), and ranks highest in overall phonemic diversity among all languages studied in the research. According to linguist Qian Nairong, who spent eight years teaching in Fengxian and studying its dialects, the reason Dônđäc has so many vowels is because Jinhui is the place where five isoglosses intersect.

== Phonology ==
Jinhui has 20 oral vowel phonemes, much more than Standard Mandarin which can theoretically be analysed as having as few as 2 vowels. Pairs of checked and non-checked finals have different vowels. These differences are meaningful in distinguishing phonemes, and therefore they are considered different vowels.

Non‑checked	i	y	e	ø	ɛ	ɑ	ɨ	ɯ	ɔ	o	u
Checked	ɪˀ	ʏˀ	ʌˀ	œˀ	æˀ	aˀ	—	əˀ	ɒˀ	ɵˀ	—
Nasal	ɪ̃	ʏ̃	—	—	ɛ̃	ã	—	ə̃	ɒ̃	ɵ̃	—

Whole-syllable rimes: 鱼 [ŋ̍], [ɚ], 亩 [m̩]

There is also a rhotic vowel [ɚ] which also occurs in restricted environments and is not argued to be a separate vowel, as well as syllabic nasals /ŋ̍ m̩/. There are no diphthongs in Jinhui; all vowels are monophthongs.

Jinhui also has a large number of consonants, including glottalized stops and a palatalized series:

Consonant phonemes
		Labial		Alveolar /Dental		Palatal	Velar		Glottal
		plain	pal.	plain	pal.	Palatal	plain	pal.	Glottal
Nasal		m 门	mʲ 秒	n 男	nʲ 女		ŋ 饿		
Stop	voiceless aspirated	pʰ 普	pʰʲ 票	tʰ 土	tʰʲ 跳		kʰ 苦		
Stop	voiced	b 步	bʲ 瓢	d 图	dʲ 掉		g 搞		ʔ 矮
Stop	voiced pre-glottalized	ˀb 布	ˀbʲ 表	ˀd 多	ˀdʲ 吊	ˀɟ 叫			
Affricate	voiceless			t͡s 早	t͡ɕ 酒				
Affricate	voiceless aspirated	k͡fʰ 快		t͡sʰ 草	t͡ɕʰ 巧				
Affricate	voiced	ɡ͡v 怪		d͡z 肇	d͡ʑ 桥				
Fricative	voiceless	f 夫		s 洒	ɕ 小				h 很
Fricative	voiced	v 负	vʲ 覅	z 柴	ʑ 寻				ɦ 鞋
Approximant		w 喂		l 乱	lʲ 料	j 要			

The glottalized consonants are unique to the Jinhui dialect and neighboring areas. Most distinctive is /ˀɟ/, found for example in 金 /ˀɟɪ̃˥˧/.

There are other glottalized consonants, such as [ˀm ˀn ˀnʲ ˀl], etc., but these are predictable by the tone and are therefore allophones.

[kfʰ ɡv] are phonetically unusual for a Chinese variety; these and the palatalized series correspond to the Mandarin medial vowels -u- and -i-.

It is not clear how many phonemic tones Jinhui has. Of the eight traditional tones, one pair is found in checked syllables, and so not phonemically distinctive. All four pairs may depend on the voicing of the initial, as in other varieties of Wu, but the existence of [ˀm ˀn ˀnʲ ˀl] suggests either that they are distinctive after sonorants, or that the consonant inventory is larger.

	꜀平 Level	꜂上 Rising	去꜄ Departing	入꜆ Entering
yin	˥˧ 53	˧˧˥ 335	˦ 4	˧˥ˀ 35
yang	˨˧˩ 231	˩˩˧ 113	˨˧ 23	˨˧ˀ 23

There is also a 'light' (unstressed) tone, [˨] 2.

== Education ==
In an effort to preserve its unique dialect, Jinhui began teaching it in school in 2012, with a textbook written by Fudan University professor Li Hui, a Jinhui native, and Hong Yulong, the principal of Jinhui School.
