= Romanization of Wu Chinese =

Romanizations for Shanghainese and Suzhounese

Wu Chinese has four major schools of romanization.

The most popular school, Common Wu Pinyin (通用吴语拼音), was developed by amateur language clubs and local learners. There are two competing schemes; both adhere to the International Phonetic Alphabet (IPA) and are very similar to each other. The initial scheme was "Wu Chinese Society pinyin" (吴语协会拼音, developed around 2005), and it formed the basis of "Wugniu pinyin" (吴语学堂拼音, around 2016). Wu Chinese Society pinyin in general does not mark tones. The name Wugniu comes from the Shanghainese pronunciation of 吴语. Either of them is the default romanization scheme in most learning materials.

The second and historical school is the missionary school (see zh:吴语拉丁化方案). This school of English-based Latin orthographies was developed by Western missionaries in the late 19th and early 20th centuries and used to write Bible translations and other educational texts. A representative romanization from this school is the Edkins romanization of Shanghainese.

Another school is the Latin Phonetic Method (吴语拉丁式注音法, French-Wu or Fawu [法吴]). Its use is in decline. It utilizes the similarities between French and Wu phonetics and thus adheres to both IPA and French orthography. It was developed in 2001 by a Shanghai-born surgeon living in Lyon, France.

The final, and least used school, is developed by modifying Hanyu pinyin as sanctioned by the State Council. It is the only school developed by professional linguists, mostly working in state-administered universities. While more than 20 competing schemes within this school have been published since the 1980s, the most notable one is the Shanghainese Pinyin (上海话拼音方案, often shortened to Qian's Pin [钱拼]), developed by Qian Nairong in 2006. This school is often used in formally published dictionaries and textbooks compiled by Qian and others.

== Comparison chart ==
All examples are given in Shanghainese and Suzhounese.

=== Initials ===
IPA	Romanization schemes				Characters
IPA	Wu Chinese Society	Wugniu	French-Wu	Qian's Pinyin	Characters
p	p	p	p	b	巴百
pʰ	ph	ph	ph	p	怕捧
b	b	b	b	bh	旁别
m	m	m	m	mh	没母
ˀm	'm	m	mh	m	闷美
f	f	f	f	f	夫反
v	v	v	v	fh	佛犯
ˀv	v	v	vh	v	朆/ˀvəɲ⁵³/
t	t	t	t	d	多德
tʰ	th	th	th	t	体通
d	d	d	d	dh	地同
n	n	n	n	nh, -n	纳努
ˀn	'n	n	nh	ng	囡呢
ȵ	ny	gn	gn	nh	尼女
ˀȵ	'ny	gn	kn	n	研妞
l	l	l	l	lh	勒路
ˀl	'l	l	lh	l	拎了
ts		ts	tz	z	煮增質
tsʰ		tsh	ts	c	處倉出
s	s	s	s	s	书三
z	z	z	z	sh	传食
ˀz	'z	z	zh	sh	乳（杭州）/ˀzʉ⁵³/
tɕ	c	c	c	j	居尖
tɕʰ	ch	ch	ch	q	曲青
dʑ	j	j	dj	jh	求极
ɕ	sh	sh	x	x	需血
ʑ	zh	zh	j	xh	谢墙
k	k	k	k	g	工各
kʰ	kh	kh	kh	k	苦客
ɡ	g	g	g	gh	共搞
ŋ	ng	ng	ng	nhg-, -ng	鹅牙
ˀŋ	ng	ng	nk	ng	我砑
h	h	h	h	h	好黑
ɦ	gh / w / y	gh / w / y	r /w / y	hh/wh/yh	红合
ˀɦ			rh	h	嗨 /ˀɦɛ⁵³/
ˀ	-/u/i	-/u/i	-/u/i	-/w/y	恩en乌u衣i迂iu

=== Finals ===
Shanghainese IPA	Suzhounese IPA	Romanization schemes				Characters
Shanghainese IPA	Suzhounese IPA	Wu Chinese Society	Wugniu	French-Wu	Qian's Pinyin	Characters
a	ɑ	a	a	a	a	蟹
ua	uɑ	ua	ua	ua	ua	怪
ia	iɑ	ia	ia	ia	ia	写
o	o	o	o	au	o	沙
io	io	io	io	iau	io	靴
ɿ(ɨ)	ɿ(ɨ)	y	y	y	y	斯
(ɿ)	ʮ(ʉ)	yu	yu	y	y	书
i	i	i	i	i	i	移
u	u	u	u	u	u	副
(u)	əu	ou	ou	u	u	乌
y	y	iu	iu	ü	(y)u	遇
ɛ (Note: /(u)ɛ/ generally not distinct from /(u)e/ in modern Urban Shanghainese, merged together as /(u)ᴇ/)	(ᴇ)	ae	ae	e	ae	兰
e	ᴇ	e	e	e	e	雷
uɛ	(uᴇ)	uae	uae	ue	ue	还
ue	uᴇ	ue	ue	ue	ue	会
iɛ (Note: raised to mid /iᴇ/ in modern Urban Shanghainese; Wugniu respelled to <-ie>, not equivalent to prior <-ie> as Wugniu considers /-ie/ to have merged into /i/ <-i> in modern Shanghainese)	-	iae	iae			械
ɔ	æ	au	au	o	ao	包
iɔ	iæ	iau	iau	io	iao	萧
ɤ	øʏ	eu	eu	oe	ou	勾
iɤ	iʏ	ieu	ieu	ioe	iou	旧
ie (Note: variably merged into /i/ depending on the speaker)	iɪ	ie	ie	i	i	先
ø	ø	oe	oe	eu	oe	干
uø	uø	uoe	uoe	ueu	uoe	碗
yø	iø	ioe	ioe	ieu	ioe	捐
ã	ã	an	an	aen	an	梗
uã	uã	uan	uan	uaen	uan	横
iã	iã	ian	ian	iaen	ian	阳
ɑ̃	ɑ̃	aon	aon	an	ang	刚
uɑ̃	uɑ̃	uaon	uaon	uan	uang	黄
iɑ̃	iɑ̃	iaon	iaon	ian	iang	旺
oŋ	oŋ	on	on	on	ong	东
ioŋ	ioŋ	ion	ion	ion	iong	兄
ən	ən	en	en	en	en	真
uəɲ	uən	uen	uen	uen	uen	昆
iɪɲ	i(ɪ)n	in	in	in	in	清
yɪn	y(ə)n	iuin	iun	ün	(y)un	君
ɐʔ	aʔ	aeh	aeq	aq	ak	鸭
uɐʔ	uaʔ	uaeh	uaeq	uaq	uak	刮
iɐʔ	iaʔ	iaeh	iaeq	iaq	iak	甲
yɪʔ	yaʔ	iuaeh	iuaeq	uiq	yuik	曰
ɐʔ	ɑʔ	ah	aq	aq	ak	格
uɐʔ	uɑʔ	uah	uaq	uaq	uak	猾
iɐʔ	iɑʔ	iah	iaq	iaq	iak	脚
əʔ	əʔ	eh	eq	eq	ek	黑
uəʔ	uəʔ	ueh	ueq	ueq	uek	阔
iɪʔ	iəʔ	ih	iq	iq	ik	立
yɪʔ	yəʔ	iuih	iuq	uiq	yuik	决
oʔ	oʔ	oh	oq	oq	ok	读
ioʔ	ioʔ	ioh	ioq	ioq	iok	局
ɦəl	əl	r	er	er	er	而
m̩	m̩	m	m	m	m	无
n̩	n̩	n	n	n	n	尔
ŋ̍	ŋ̍	ng	ng	ng	ng	五

=== Tones ===
Shanghainese IPA	Suzhounese IPA	Wenzhounese IPA	Romanization schemes				Characters
Shanghainese IPA	Suzhounese IPA	Wenzhounese IPA	Wu Chinese Society	Wugniu	French-Wu	Qian's Pinyin	Characters
˥˧(53)	˥(44)	˧(33)	1	1	/		天听知
˦(22)or˩˩˧(113)	˨˨˦(223)	˨˧(23)	1	2	/		人华词
˦˧˦(434)or˨˨˥(334)	˥˩(51)	˧˥(35)	2	3	-h		可海洗
˨˩˧(213)or˩˩˧(113)	-	˧˥(35)	2	4	-h		尾有近
˨˨˥(334)	˥˨˦(523)	˥˨(42)	3	5	-r		去会唱
˩˩˧(113)	˨˧˩(231)	˨˧(23)	3	6	-r		定烂自
˥(55)	˥˧(43)	˨˩˧(213)	4	7	-q		只不结
˩˨(12)	˨˧(23)	˨˩˧(213)	4	8	-q		日绝缚

== See also ==
Wiktionary: Entry Guidelines for Northern Wu
