= Qian Weiyan =

Chinese politician and poet (977–1034)

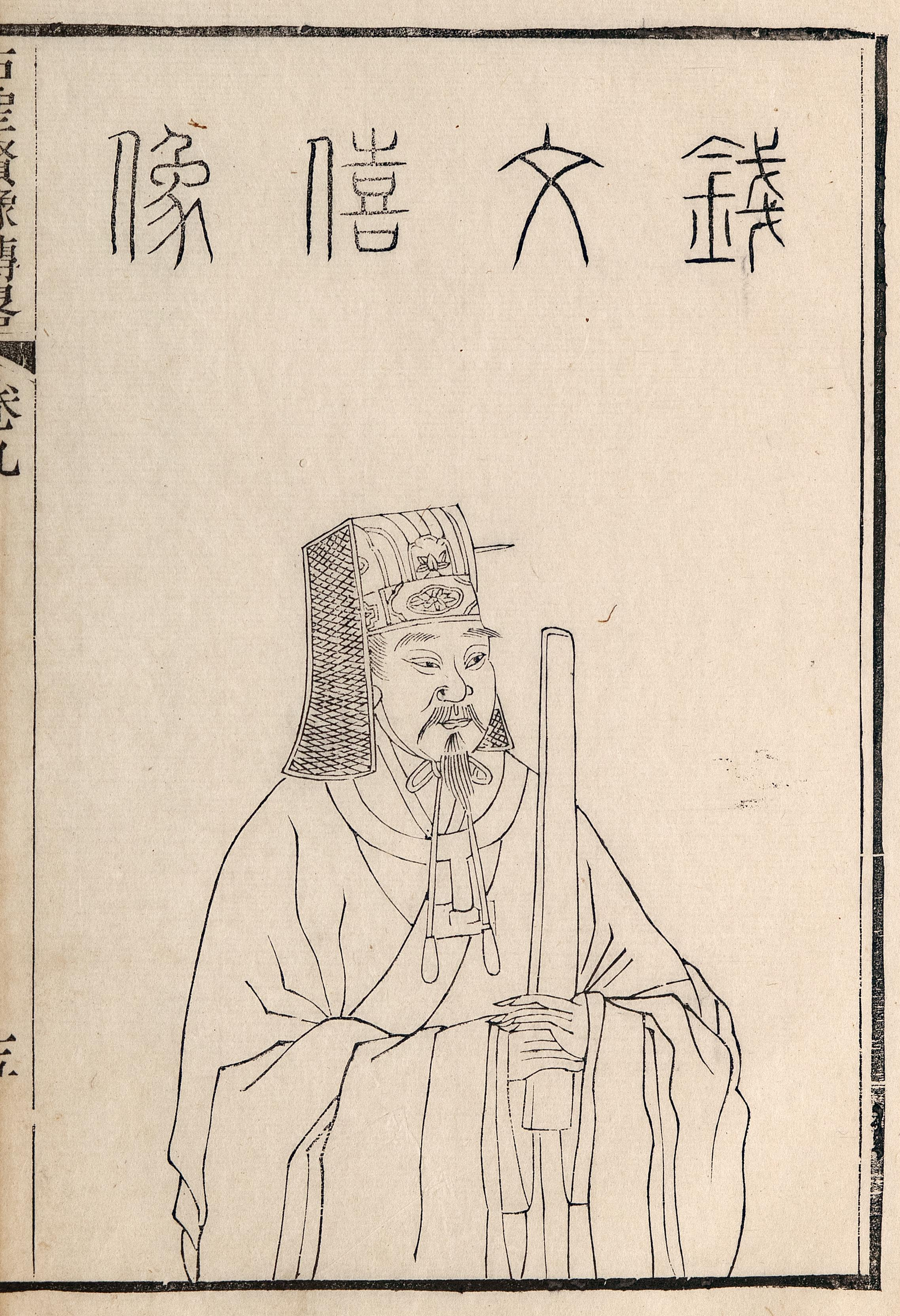
Qian Weiyan

Qian Weiyan (Chinese: 錢惟演; 977 – September 3, 1034) was a Chinese politician and poet. He was the 14th son of the last king of Wuyue Qian Hongchu and the great grandson of Qian Liu. He was best known for his literary style "Xikun style" which features the use of various anecdotes as well as ornate diction.

Weiyan was born in Hangzhou which was the capital of Wuyue. In 978, he moved to Bianliang with his father after the surrender of Wuyue to Song. He was then appointed the military training commissioner of Song. During the reign of Emperor Zhenzong of Song, Qian was transferred from military departments to civil positions. As an editor, he participated the establishment of Cefu Yuangui, the largest encyclopedia compiled during the Song dynasty.

In 1015, Qian became a member of Hanlin Academy. In 1020, he was appointed Shumishi. In 1033, Qian became the Jiedushi of Taining Jun and the Executive of Henan Fu. Qian enjoyed a luxury life as a former prince. During his term in Henan Fu, He occasionally selected and sent special varieties of Paeonia suffruticosa to the imperial court with the purpose of entertaining courtiers. Su Shi, one of the renowned poet in Chinese history, wrote a poem mocking his luxurious life-style. Ouyang Xiu recorded Qian's action after his coral penholder was stolen. According to Ouyang, Qian simply paid a mount of money that satisfied the thief and took the penholder back.

Qian was regarded as a bookworm by his contemporaries. It is said that he never stopped reading books in his daily life. Eventually, Qian's political fortune waned after Emperor Renzong of Song took over his power. As a trusted courtier of Empress Guo whom Emperor Renzong saw as a political threat, Qian was expelled from the imperial court.

Qian died in the year of 1034 and was given a posthumous name "Wenxi" (文僖).
