= Qian Weijun =

Chinese king of Wuyue (955–981)

Qian Weijun (錢惟濬) (October 22, 955 – 991), courtesy name Yuchuan (禹川), formally Prince Anxi of Bin (邠安僖王, "peaceful and careful"), was the heir apparent to Qian Chu (King Zhongyi), the fifth and last king of Wuyue of the Chinese Five Dynasties and Ten Kingdoms period. After Wuyue's absorption into its suzerain Song, he continued to serve Song until his death at age 35/36.

== Background ==
Qian Weijun was born in 955, as the oldest biological son of Wuyue's king Qian Hongchu (later renamed Qian Chu). His mother was Qian Chu's wife Sun Taizhen. Immediately upon his birth, he received the title of heir apparent. When he was just a few years old, Qian Hongchu, acting on authority granted him by the emperor of Wuyue's then-suzerain Later Zhou, gave Qian Weijun the titles of deputy military governor of Wuyue's two main circuits, Zhenhai (鎮海, headquartered in modern Hangzhou, Zhejiang) and Zhendong (鎮東, headquartered in modern Shaoxing, Zhejiang); acting Taibao (太保), and overseers of all military matters of the two circuits of both the native and the guest armies.

In 960, after the Later Zhou throne was seized by the general Zhao Kuangyin, who established Song dynasty as its Emperor Taizu, Qian Weijun received the title of acting Taifu (太傅). In 962, he received the title of military governor (Jiedushi) of Jianwu Circuit (建武, headquartered in modern Nanning, Guangxi) — a completely honorary title as Jianwu was then under the control of Southern Han. In 963, he received the title of acting Taiwei (太尉, one of the Three Excellencies). Later that year, when Emperor Taizu was set to offer sacrifices to heaven and earth, Qian Hongchu (whose name was changed to Qian Chu by this point to observe naming taboo for Emperor Taizu's father Zhao Hongyin) sent Qian Weijun to the Song capital Kaifeng to participate in the ceremony. In 968, when the Song emperor again was offering sacrifices to heaven and earth, Qian Weijun was again sent to Kaifeng to participate in the ceremony. As he was set to departure from Kaifeng back to Wuyue in early 969, Emperor Taizu bestowed on him the titles of military governor of Zhenhai and Zhendong. In 971, Qian Chu again sent him to submit tributes to the Song emperor.

== Heir Apparent ==
Subsequently, when Wuyue forces participated in the Song campaign that would destroy Wuyue's northwestern neighbor Jiangnan, Qian Weijun accompanied his father Qian Chu on the campaign, and, after the campaign, was bestowed the honorary chancellor title of Tong Zhongshu Menxia Pingzhangshi (同中書門下平章事). In 976, when Qian Chu went to Kaifeng himself to pay homage to the Song emperor, Qian Weijun accompanied him, and subsequently, when the Song emperor was set to visit the western capital Luoyang, Qian Chu asked to accompany him, an offer that Emperor Taizu declined (instead sending Qian Chu back to his own domain) but allowed Qian Weijun to accompany him.

Later in the year, Emperor Taizu died, and was succeeded by his brother Zhao Guangyi the Prince of Jin (as Emperor Taizong). Shortly after, Qian Weijun's mother Queen Sun also died, and he formally left governmental service to observe a mourning period for her, but Emperor Taizong then recalled him back to governmental service, and gave him additional general titles. As Qian Chu was again preparing to go to Kaifeng to pay homage to the new emperor, he first sent Qian Weijun to submit tributes, and Qian Weijun initially stayed at Kaifeng, but then was sent to Song Prefecture (宋州, in modern Shangqiu, Henan) in spring 978 to welcome his father there and accompany his father to Kaifeng.

Meanwhile, Qian Chu was hoping that Emperor Taizong, just like Emperor Taizu before, would allow him to return to his new domain, and so offered rich tributes to the emperor. Meanwhile, though, the Song chancellor Lu Duoxun was advocating that the emperor detain Qian Chu at Kaifeng and absorb Wuyue into Song proper — just as Chen Hongjin the military governor of Pinghai Circuit had just recently surrendered the two prefectures under his control to Song. While Emperor Taizong did not approve Lu's proposal, he also did not permit Qian Chu to leave Kaifeng, even after Qian Chu submitted reports on Wuyue's armies and offered to be relieved of the Song-bestowed titles of King of Wuyue and Generalissimo. In fear, Qian submitted a petition surrendering the 13 prefectures that Wuyue consisted of, ending Wuyue's existence as a state.

== After absorption by Song ==
After absorbing Wuyue, Emperor Taizong gave Qian Chu a new kingly title — King of Huaihai — and made Qian Weijun the military governor of Huainan Circuit (淮南, headquartered in modern Yangzhou, Jiangsu), which was the extent of the ceremonial Kingdom of Huaihai, although both Qian Chu and Qian Weijun, regardless of subsequent titles they were given, were usually kept at Kaifeng at the Song court. The close relatives of the Qian clan and the officials who served on Qian Chu's staff were also ordered to report to Kaifeng. Later, they accompanied the Song emperor on campaigns to destroy Northern Han (which was successful) and to recapture the Sixteen Prefectures occupied by the Khitan Liao dynasty (which was not successful), as well as a subsequent visit that Emperor Taizong took to Daming (大名, in modern Handan, Hebei).

In 984, Qian Weijun was made the military governor of Shannan East Circuit (山南東道, headquartered in modern Xiangyang, Hubei) (apparently corresponding to his father's change of title to be King of Hannan at that time). In 987, he was made the military governor of Anyuan Circuit (安遠, headquartered in modern Xiaogan, Hubei), but continued to remain at Kaifeng, while his father Qian Chu was sent out of the capital to serve as the military governor of Wusheng Circuit (武勝, headquartered in modern Nanyang, Henan). In 988, he was created the Duke of Xiao. Shortly after, Qian Chu died, but Emperor Taizong recalled him to service and gave him the greater honorary chancellor title of Zhongshu Ling (中書令). Upon accounting of their father's estate, Qian Weijun and his brothers offered a large tribute of money, gold, silk, rhinoceros horn, jade, ivory, clove, jewelry, musical instruments, gambling complements, vessels, and wagons from the estate to the emperor, which were apparently accepted, but his further tribute of female musicians was declined. In 990, the government of Hang Prefecture (杭州, in modern Hangzhou, Zhejiang) — formerly Wuyue's capital — submitted to the emperor the jade and bamboo commission tablets and the iron certificates issued to the kings of Wuyue, taken from the Qian ancestral shrines. The emperor declined them and instead gave them to Qian Weijun.

Qian Weijun suffered a sudden illness and died in 991. (The shortness of his lifespan was blamed on his favoring drinking.) Emperor Taizong posthumously created him the Prince of Bin, and sent imperial eunuchs to oversee the funeral arrangements.
