= Qian Chu =

King of Wuyue from 948 to 978

King Zhongyi of Wuyue 吳越忠懿王
- King of Wuyue (more...)
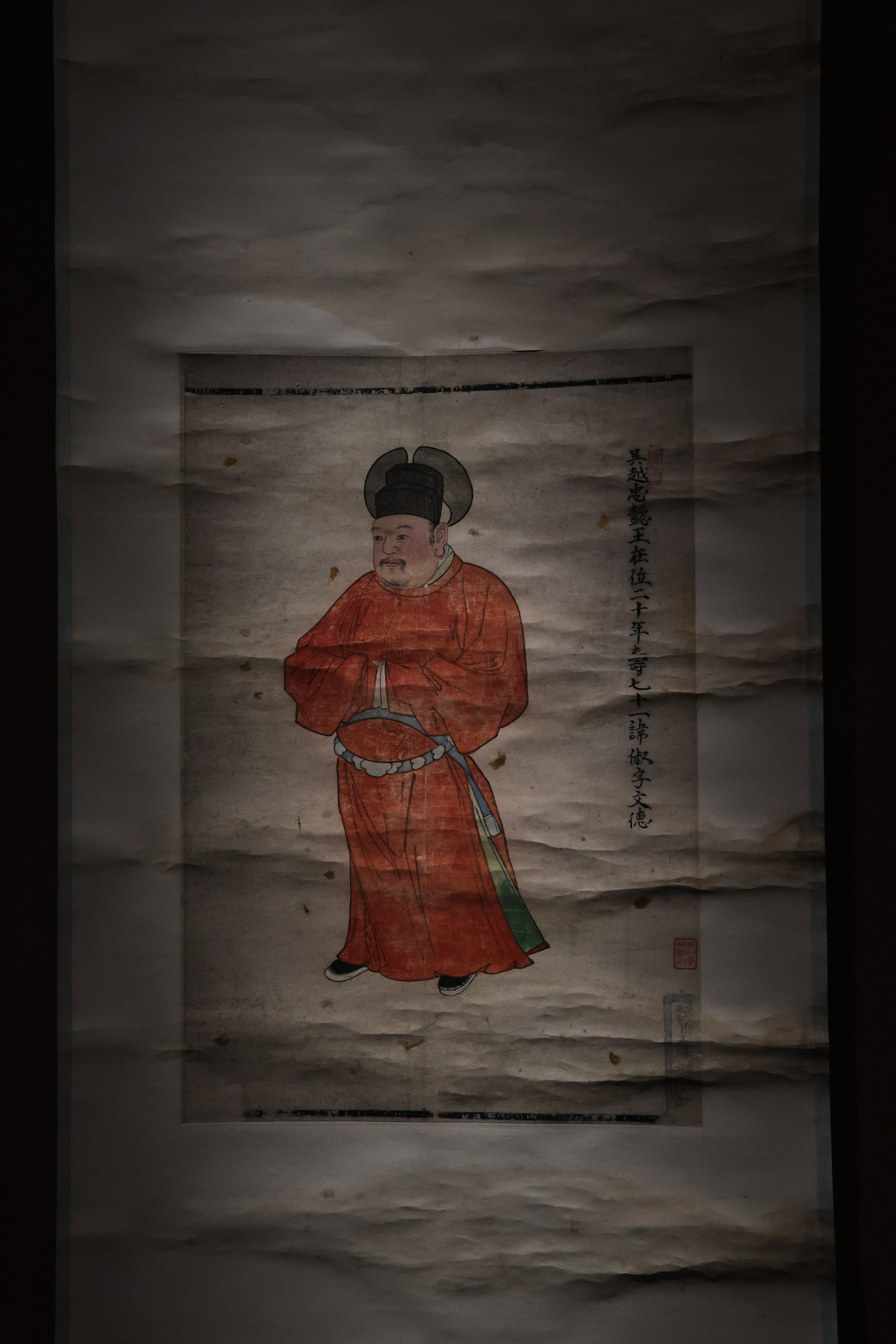

King of Wuyue
- Reign: 17 February 948 – 9 June 978
- Predecessor: Qian Hongzong
- Born: 29 September 929; Hang Prefecture, Wuyue
- Died: 7 October 988 (aged 59); Deng Prefecture, Northern Song
- Burial: in modern Luoyang
- Spouse: Queen Sun Taizhen; Queen Yu; Consort Huang
- Issue: Qian Weijun; Qian Weiyan; others
Names
- Qián Hóngchù (錢弘俶), later changed to Qián Chù (錢俶) in 960
Era dates
- Adopted the era name of Later Han: Qianyou (乾祐): 948–950; Adopted the era names of Later Zhou: Guangshun (廣順): 951–953; Xiande (顯德): 954–960; Adopted the era names of Song dynasty: Jianlong (建隆): 960–963; Qiande (乾德): 963–968; Kaibao (開寶): 968–976; Taipingxingguo (太平興國): 976–978
Posthumous name
- King Zhongyi of Qin (秦國忠懿王)
- House: Qian
- Dynasty: Wuyue
- Father: Qian Yuanguan
- Mother: Lady Wu Hanyue

Qian Chu
- Traditional Chinese: 錢俶
- Simplified Chinese: 钱俶
Transcriptions
Standard Mandarin
- Hanyu Pinyin: Qián Chù
- Wade–Giles: Ch'ien^{2} Ch'u^{4}

Qian Hongchu
- Traditional Chinese: 錢弘俶
- Simplified Chinese: 钱弘俶
Transcriptions
Standard Mandarin
- Hanyu Pinyin: Qián Hóngchù

Qian Wende
- Traditional Chinese: 錢文德
- Simplified Chinese: 钱文德
Transcriptions
Standard Mandarin
- Hanyu Pinyin: Qián Wéndé

Qian Chu (29 September 929 – 7 October 988), courtesy name Wende, known as Qian Hongchu before 960, also known by his posthumous name as the King Zhongyi of Wuyue, was the last king of Wuyue during the Five Dynasties and Ten Kingdoms period of China. He reigned from 947 until 978, when he surrendered his kingdom to the Northern Song dynasty.

== Life ==
Qian Chu came to power after his brother, Qian Zong, was deposed in a coup d'état. At the time, Wuyue was at its largest territorial extent, ruling 13 zhou in modern-day Zhejiang, Jiangsu, Shanghai, and Fujian. Throughout its history, Wuyue maintained a policy of nominally submitting to the successive dominant northern regimes. Unlike the other small states in the south, the Wuyue kings never declared themselves Emperor. In return, the northern regimes respected Wuyue's autonomy and conferred upon its kings high honours, one of which was the title of "Commander of All Horses and Soldiers Under Heaven". Indeed, Qian Chu changed his name from the original Qian Hongchu, because the character hong was barred by taboo (as the name of Emperor Taizu of Song's father was Zhao Hongyin (趙弘殷)).

When the Song Dynasty unified northern China in the 960s, Qian Chu reportedly followed his ancestor Qian Liu's instruction to submit as soon as possible when the "true lord" appeared. In 960, Qian Chu submitted to Song, and changed his name in the same year. Subsequently, Qian Chu obeyed orders from the Song court to participate in the annexation of the other small southern kingdoms on behalf of the Song emperor. In 968, he was again made the King of Wuyue by the Song emperor, and was subsequently invested with further imperial honours. In 977, the new emperor, Emperor Taizong of Song, invested Qian with the nominal titles Chancellor, Chief Secretary, and Commander of All Horses and Soldiers Under Heaven.

However, in 978, Qian Chu surrendered his territories to the Song regime, possibly under veiled threat from the Song court. Nevertheless, the "voluntary" surrender protected the Wuyue region from the ravages of war that visited other contemporary regimes. The region was able to maintain its infrastructure and economic advantage, built up over the Wuyue period, which in no small part contributed to the Yangtze Delta being the economic centre of China up to the present day.

To allay northern suspicions and prevent conflict, Qian Chu stayed in the Song capital, Bianjing (now Kaifeng), and moved 3000 members of his household there. Qian nominally remained a king. His sons and a large number of the Wuyue elite were given various imperial posts and titles. Initially, Emperor Taizong of Song raised the prefecture of Yangzhou to the nominal state of Huaihai (淮海), and installed Qian Chu as King of Huaihai (淮海国王). In 984, Qian Chu was made King of Hannan (汉南国王) (a smaller nominal feoff) instead, and in 987, was reduced again to King of Nanyang (南阳国王), with the right to take up residence in Nanyang, but then immediately, was additionally made Prince of Xu (许王), with an enlarged feoff. In 988, Qian Chu lost his title as king and was made Prince of Deng (邓王) instead, with a larger nominal feoff and actual income.

Qian Chu reportedly enjoyed a good personal relationship with the emperor, being regularly summoned to the palace for banquets and ball games. On his 60th birthday (by the Chinese calendar) in 988, Emperor Taizong of Song sent him wine as a gift. After drinking the wine, he became violently ill and died that night. He was given a state funeral, was posthumously raised to King of Qin, and was buried near Luoyang.

Qian Chu had seven sons, one of whom went on to become a Chancellor in the Song court.

== Other legacy ==
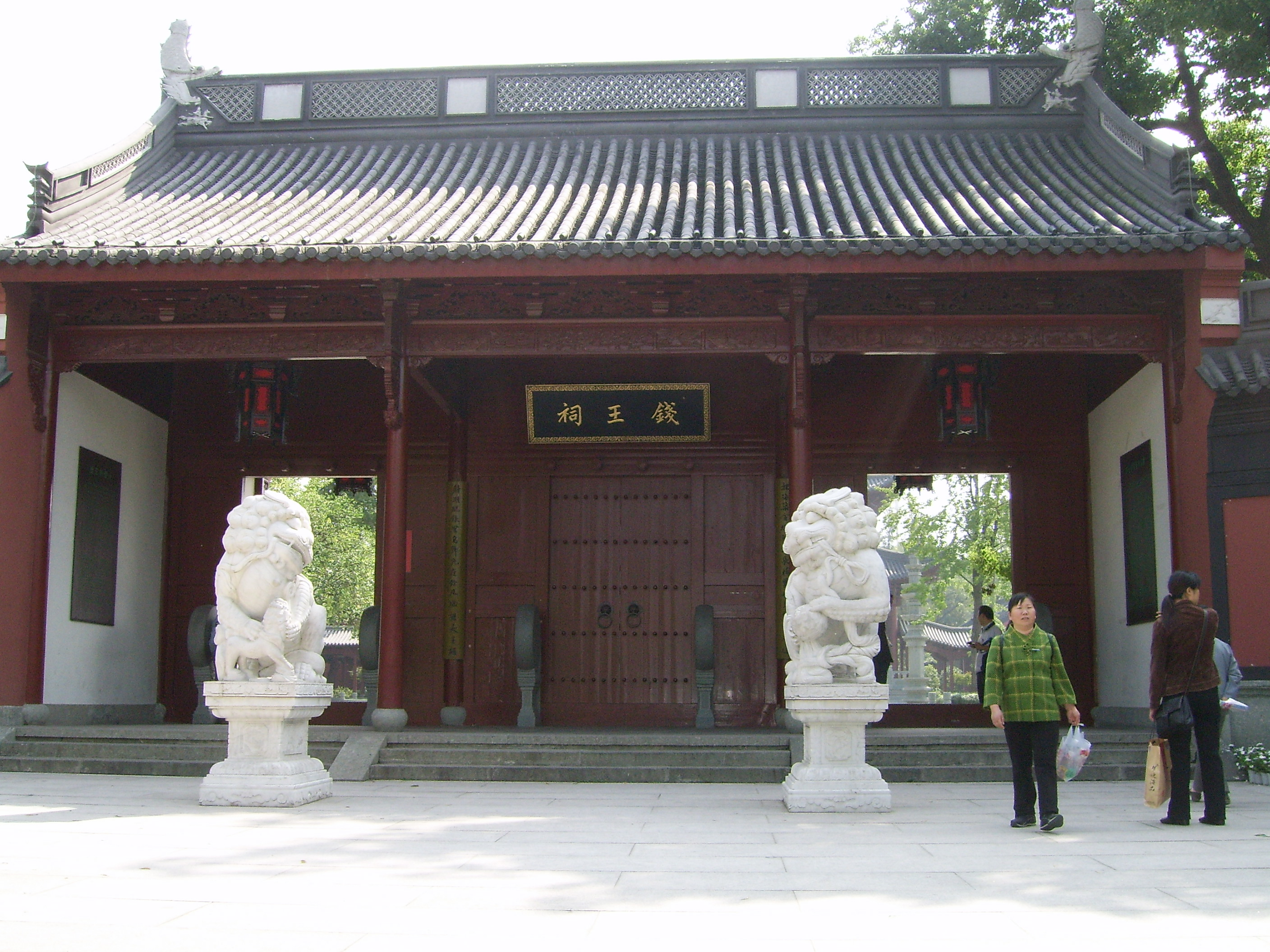
Shrine to the Qian Kings at West Lake, Hangzhou.

Qian Chu enjoyed writing poetry. One of his published poems survives to this day.

Like the other kings of Wuyue, Qian Chu was a devout Buddhist. Leifeng Pagoda in Hangzhou was constructed on his orders to celebrate the conception of his son and in some versions, for Consort Huang.

== Consorts and issue ==
- Queen of Wuyue, of the Sun clan (吳越國王妃 孫氏, d. 976), personal name Taizhen (太真)
  - Qian Weijun (錢惟濬, 22 October 955 – 991), honored Prince Anxi of Bin (邠安僖王) posthumously, first son
- Consort Huang, of the Huang clan (黃妃)
- Lady of Chu State, of the Yu clan (楚國夫人俞氏)
  - Qian Weiyan (錢惟演, 977 – 3 September 1034), Duke of Ying (英國公), fourteenth son
- Unknown:
  - Qian Weixuan (錢惟渲), third son
  - Qian Weihao (錢惟灝), fourth son
  - Qian Weijin (錢惟溍), fifth son
  - Qian Weicui (钱惟漼), sixth son
  - Eight Unnamed son
  - Qian Weiji (錢惟濟) (978-1032), fifteenth son
  - Seven daughters
- Adopted children:
  - Qian Weizhi (錢惟治) (949-1019), honored Commandery Prince of Pengcheng (彭城郡王) posthumously, biological son of Qian Hongzong

Regnal titles
Preceded by Qian Hongzong (King Zhongxun)	King of Wuyue; 947–978	Succeeded by None (Kingdom absorbed)
Preceded by Qian Hongzong (King Zhongxun)	Ruler of China (Zhejiang/Northeastern Fujian); 947–978	Succeeded by Emperor Taizong of Song
