= Xiu Prefecture =

Historical administrative division in Zhejiang, China

Coordinates: 30.73°N 120.73°E

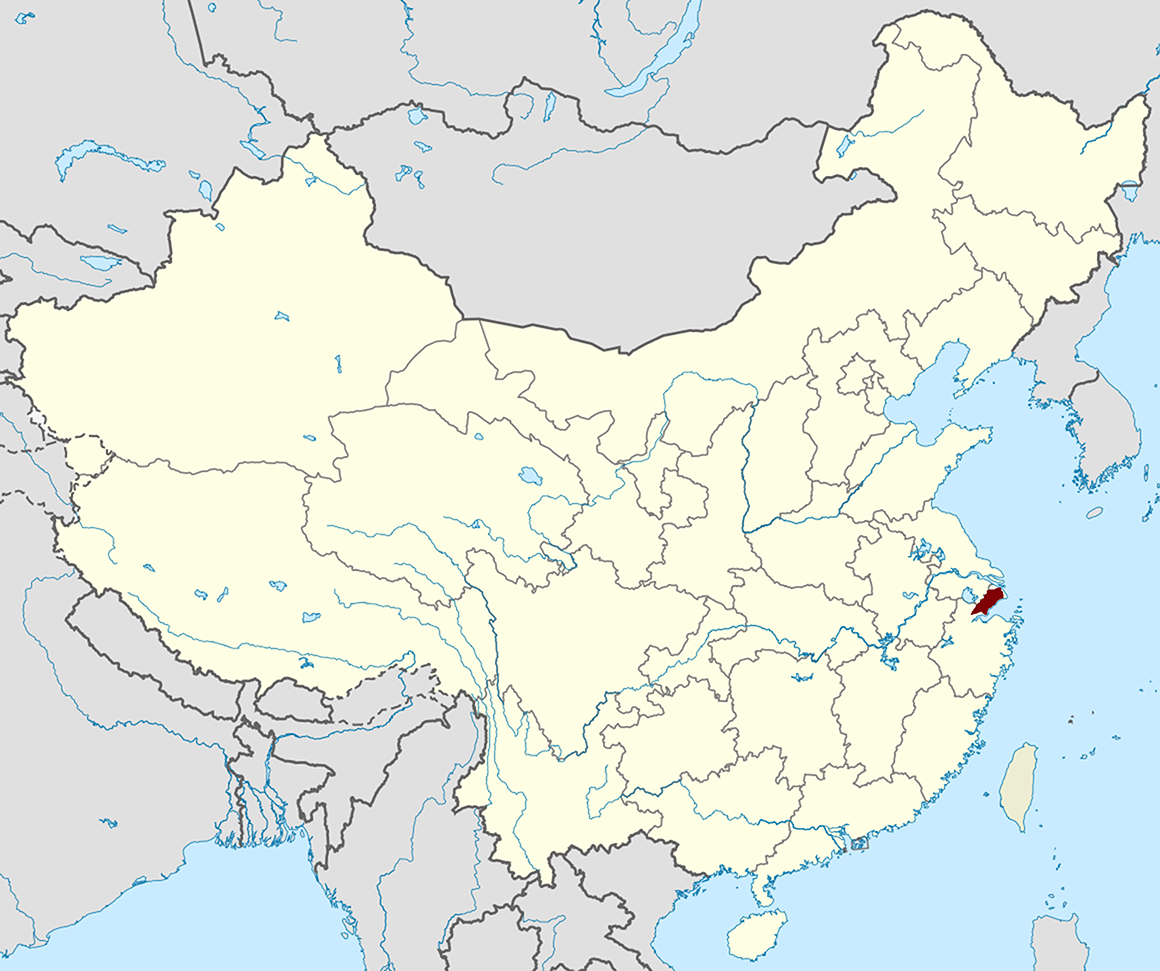
- Chinese: 秀州
Transcriptions
Standard Mandarin
- Hanyu Pinyin: Xiù Zhōu
- Wade–Giles: Hsiu^{4} Chou^{1}

Xiuzhou or Xiu Prefecture was a zhou (prefecture) in imperial China, centering on modern Jiaxing, Zhejiang, China. Its administrative area contained most of modern Shanghai. It was created by the Wuyue kingdom in 938; in 1195, the Song dynasty renamed it Jiaxing Prefecture.

== Geography ==
The administrative region of Xiu Prefecture in the Song dynasty was in modern and northern Zhejiang and southern and central Shanghai. It probably includes parts of modern:

- Under the administration of Jiaxing, Zhejiang:
  - Jiaxing
  - Pinghu
  - Tongxiang
  - Haiyan County
  - Jiashan County
- Under the administration of Shanghai:
  - Shanghai (except for Jiading District, Baoshan District and Chongming County)

== See also ==
- Jiaxing Prefecture
