= Temple of the Qian Kings =

Chinese religious building

Coordinates: 30.2450°N 120.1534°E

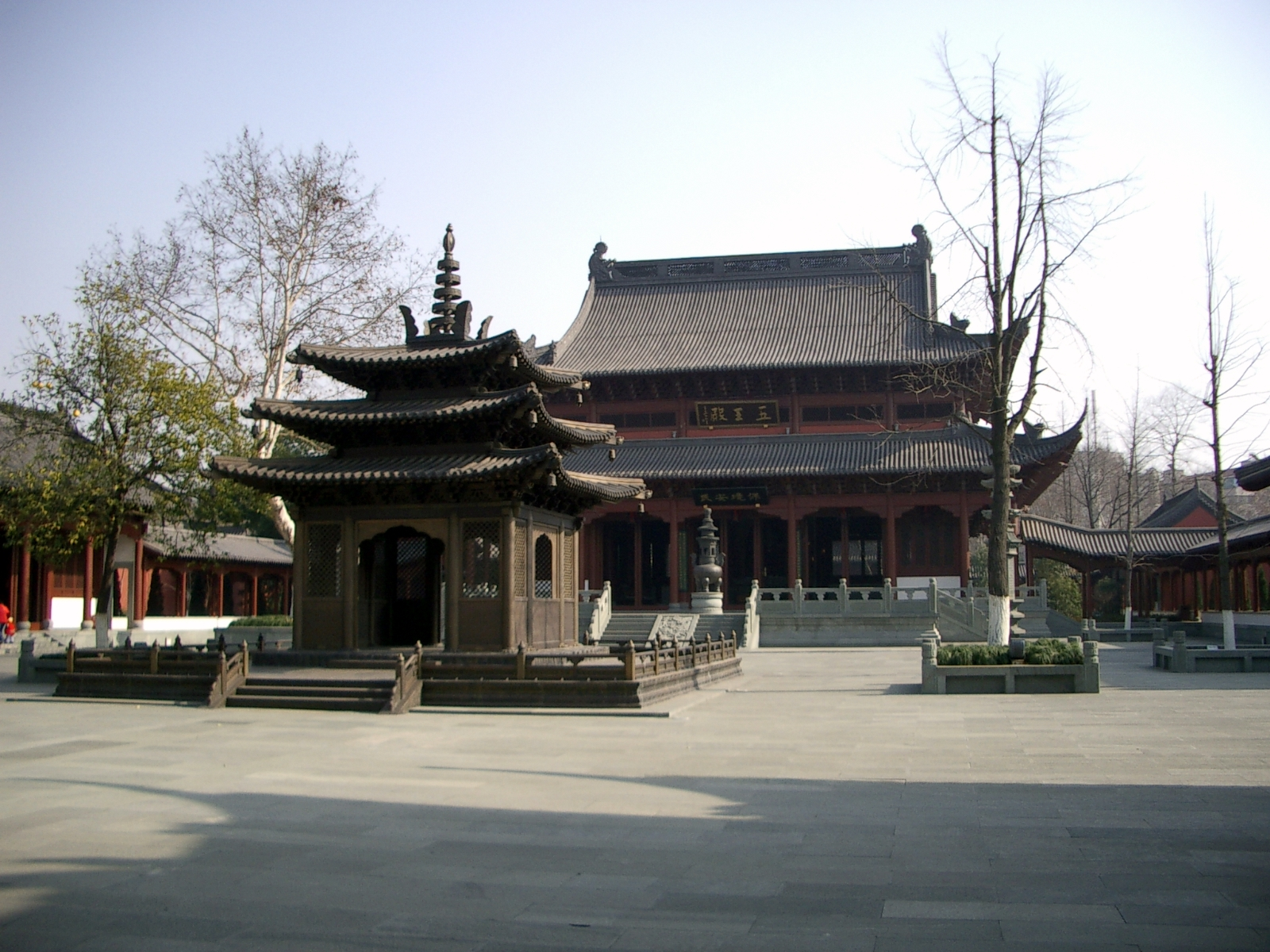
- The temple's inner courtyard
- Traditional Chinese: 錢王祠
- Simplified Chinese: 钱王祠
- Literal meaning: Temple of the Qian King(s)
Transcriptions
Standard Mandarin
- Hanyu Pinyin: Qiánwáng Cí
- Wade–Giles: Ch'ien-wang Ssu

Biaozhong Temple
- Traditional Chinese: 表忠觀
- Simplified Chinese: 表忠观
- Literal meaning: Temple of Displayed Loyalty
Transcriptions
Standard Mandarin
- Hanyu Pinyin: Biǎozhōng Guān
- Wade–Giles: Piao-chung Kuan

Qian Ancestral Temple
- Traditional Chinese: 錢祠
- Simplified Chinese: 钱祠
- Literal meaning: Qian Temple
Transcriptions
Standard Mandarin
- Hanyu Pinyin: Qián Cí
- Wade–Giles: Ch'ien Ssu

The Temple of the Qian Kings, also known by its Chinese name as the Qianwang or Qian Wang Temple, is a Chinese temple in Hangzhou, China, honoring the Qian family who ruled as kings of Wuyue in the 10th-century interregnum between the Tang and Song dynasties. Owing to the general lack of plural markers in Chinese, it is frequently understood as a temple specifically honoring Qian Liu, the first of the Wuyue kings, but it officially honors his entire dynasty. The grounds include the tomb of Qian Liu as well as four of his children and are located beside the Park of Orioles Singing in the Willows. The restored temple has been reckoned among the Ten New Scenes of West Lake under the name ”Loyalty Displayed at the Qian Temple“ (钱祠表忠, Qiáncí Biǎo Zhōng).

== History ==
A Taoist temple was first constructed at the site to honor the Qian kings of Wuyue in Yuanfeng 2 (1079) during the Song dynasty. As prefect of Hang, Su Dongpo erected a commemorative stela for it (t 表忠觀碑記, s 表忠观碑记, p Biǎozhōngguān Bēijì) that became a famous exemplar of his calligraphy. It praises the Qian kings not only for their bravery and wisdom in safeguarding and assisting their people, but also for having loyally submitted to the Song. The site was originally known as the Biaozhong Temple ("Temple of Loyalty Displayed") but gained its present name over the course of the Qing dynasty. During the many Southern Tours of the Kangxi and Qianlong Emperors of the Qing, they inscribed numerous placards for the temple with sayings such as "Ensuring the Land" (保障江山, Bǎozhàng Jiāngshān) and "Shelter Left by the Loyal and Obedient" (t 忠順遺庥, s 忠顺遗庥, p Zhōngshùn Yí Xiū).

The temple grounds were restored in 2003. In 2007, Hangzhou organized a massive ceremony in honor of the 1100th anniversary of Qian Liu's investiture as king of Wuyue. Before an audience including 400 descendants of the dynasty, the municipality's vice-mayor read an elegy; traditional ritual music was performed; offerings were made of incense, silk, grains, and the three animals (ox, sheep, pig) of the great Tailao sacrifice; and a bell was struck fourteen times: once for each prefecture of Wuyue.

== Design ==
The temple consists of two courtyards surrounded by traditional halls filled with paintings and statuary about the Qian kings. It is sited south of the present location of Yongjin Pond and across the lake from the Tomb of Yue Fei.

== Activities ==
The inner courtyard standing before the central hall honoring Qian Liu includes a large incense burner. Temple staff decorate the inner courtyard each Chinese New Year with a life-size engraving of the corresponding animal of the Chinese zodiac.

== See also ==
- Luoyang, site of the tomb of Qian Chu, last of the Qian kings of Wuyue
- Lin'an District, site of the royal mausoleums of other members of the Qian dynasty
