= Qian Nairong =

Chinese linguist

- Simplified Chinese: 钱乃荣
- Traditional Chinese: 錢乃榮
Transcriptions
Standard Mandarin
- Hanyu Pinyin: Qián Nǎiróng

Qian Nairong (Shanghainese: [ʑ̻i ne̞ɦjʊŋ]; born 1945 in Shanghai) is a Chinese linguist. He received a master's degree in Chinese from Fudan University in 1981. He is a professor and the head of the Chinese Department at Shanghai University. He is a researcher and advocate of Shanghainese, a dialect of Wu Chinese.

== Publications ==
- Shanghainese Slang (Shanghai Academy of Social Sciences Press, 1989) - 《上海方言俚语》（上海社科院出版社，1989）
- Contemporary Wu-ngu Researches (Shanghai Educational Publishing House, 1992) - 《当代吴语研究》 （上海教育出版社，1992）
- Grammar for Shanghainese Language (Shanghai People's Publishing House, 1997) - 《上海话语法》 （上海人民出版社，1997）
- Cool Slang 2000 Items (Editor, Shanghai Educational Publishing House, 2001) - 《酷语2000》 （主编，上海教育出版社，2001）
- Shanghainese Conversations (Author, Touhou Shoten) - 《上海语会话》音带（本人发音，日本东方书店）
- Shanghainese & Su-zhou Dialect Researches & Studies（Co-author, Kouseikan, 1984） - 《上海语苏州语学习与研究》（合作，日本东京光生馆，1984）
- A Brief History of Dialects in Shanghai Metropolitan Areas (Shanghai Educational Publishing House, 1988) - 《上海市区方言志》（合作，上海教育出版社，1988）
- Vocabulary for Shanghainese Dialects (Shanghai Educational Publishing House, 1991) - 《上海方言词汇》（合作，上海教育出版社，1991）
- A Brief History of the Culture & Dialects for Shanghai Area (Shanghai Literature and Art Publishing House, 2001) - 《上海文化通史·语言篇》 （上海文艺出版社，2001）
- Shanghainese Dialect Collection & the Culture (Shanghai Culture Publishing House, 2002) - 《沪语盘点——上海话文化》（上海文化出版社，2002）
