= Wuyue =

Chinese dynastic state, 907 to 978

Coordinates: 30°16′1″N 120°9′11″E

Wuyue 吳越
- 907–978
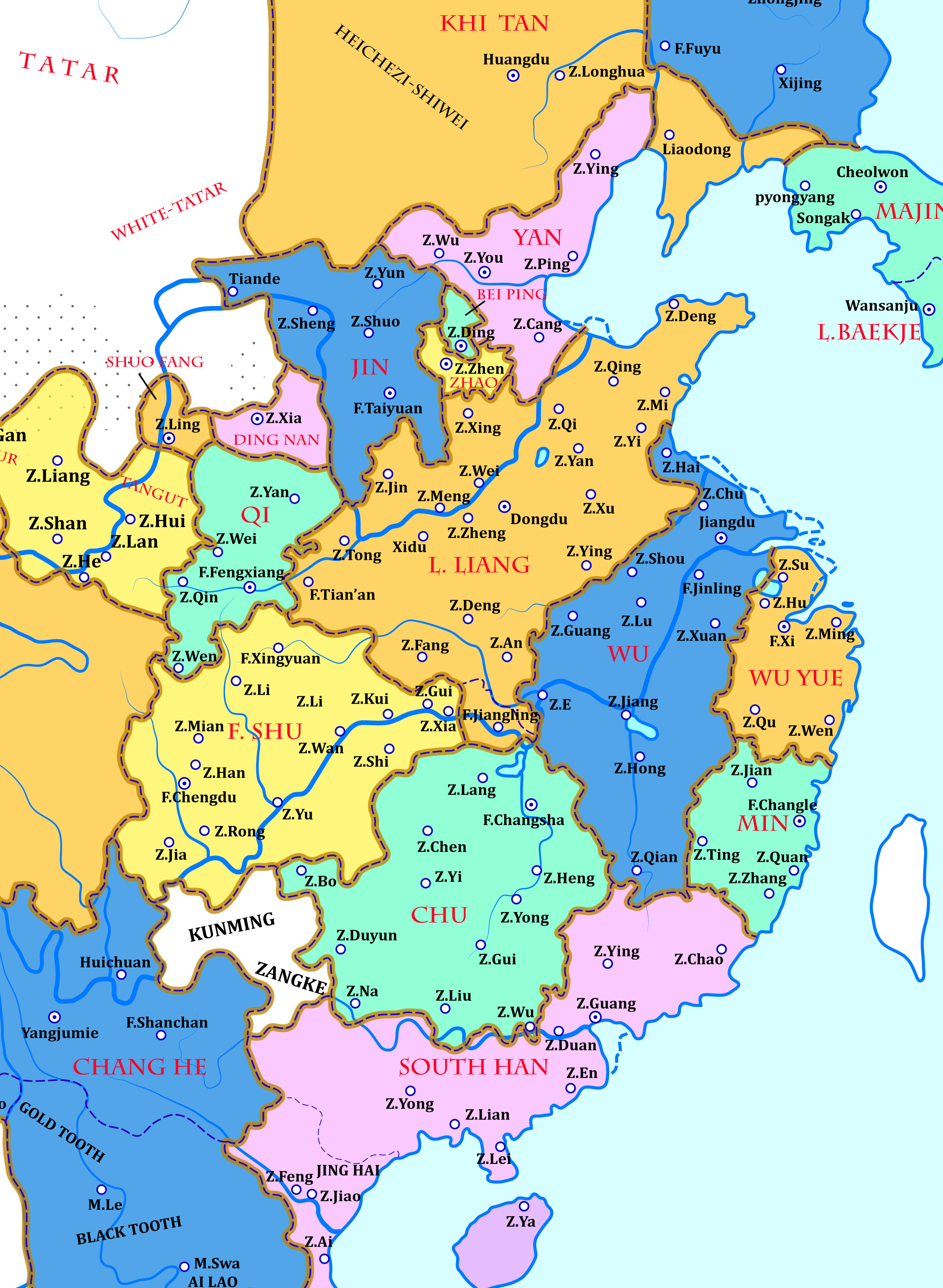
- China during the early Five Dynasties and Ten Kingdoms period. A prefix of "F." indicates a city suffixed with "-fu", a prefix of "Z." indicates a city suffixed with "-zhou".
- Status: Tributary state of Later Liang, Later Tang, Later Jin, Liao, Later Han, Later Zhou, and Northern Song dynasties
- Capital: Qiantang (Main court; Capital); Yuezhou (Eastern court)
- Common languages: Middle Chinese, Medieval Wu, Medieval Eastern Min
- Government: Monarchy
- King
  - 907–932: Qian Liu
  - 932–941: Qian Yuanguan
  - 941–947: Qian Hongzuo
  - 947: Qian Hongzong
  - 947–978: Qian Chu (Qian Hongchu)
- Historical era: Five Dynasties and Ten Kingdoms Period
  - Zhenhai Military Governorate: 886
  - Fall of the Tang dynasty: 907
  - Submitted to the Northern Song dynasty: 978
  - Extinguishment: 988
- Currency: Chinese cash, Chinese coin
Preceded by	Succeeded by
Tang dynasty	Northern Song dynasty
- Today part of: China

Wuyue (simplified Chinese: 吴越; traditional Chinese: 吳越; pinyin: Wúyuè; Wu Chinese pronunciation: [ŋu²³³.ɦyøʔ²³]) was a dynastic state of China and one of the Ten Kingdoms during the Five Dynasties and Ten Kingdoms period of Chinese history. It was ruled by the Qian clan of Haiyan (海鹽錢氏), whose family name remains widespread in the kingdom's former territory.

== Founding ==
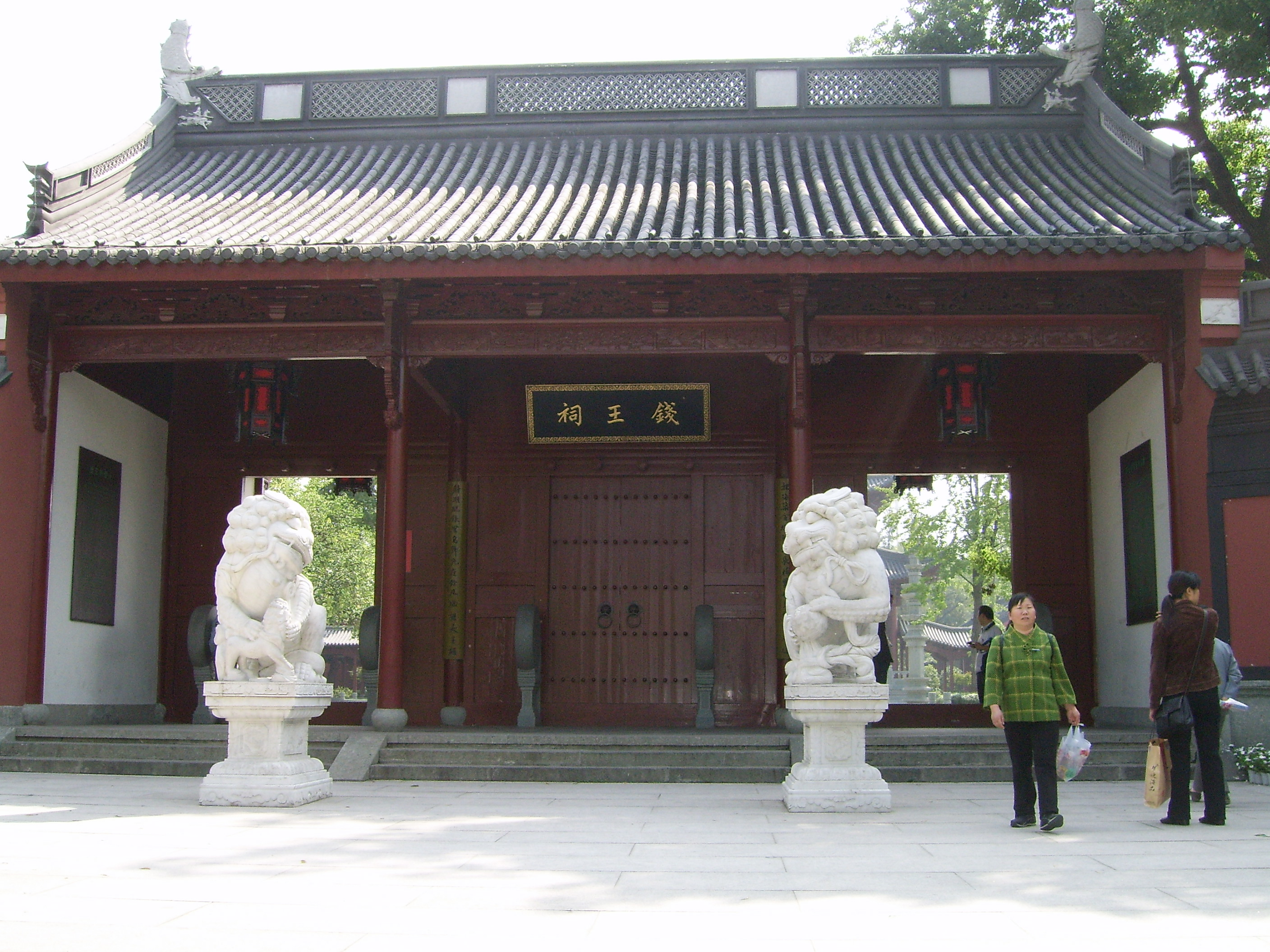
Temple of the Qian Kings in Hangzhou, one of many shrines to the kings of Wuyue which still exist in its former territory.

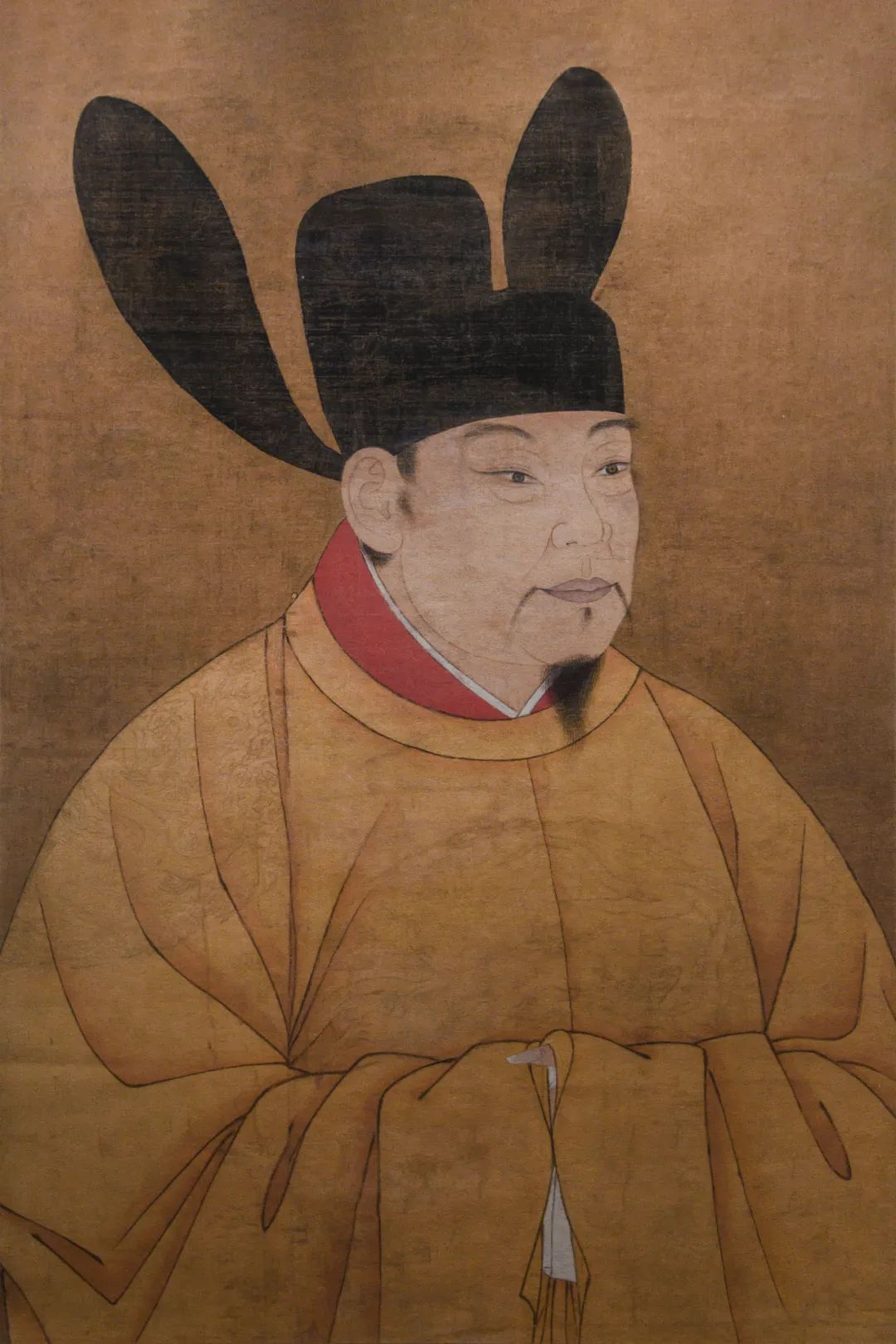
Qian Liu, the founder of Wuyue.

Beginning in 887, the Qian family provided military leaders (or jiedushi) to the Tang dynasty. Qian Liu was named Prince of Yue in 902, with the title of Prince of Wu added two years later. In 907, when the Tang dynasty fell and was replaced in the north by the Later Liang, military leaders in the south formed their own kingdoms. Qian Liu used his position to proclaim himself the King of Wuyue. This signaled the beginning of the Five Dynasties and Ten Kingdoms period which would last until the founding of the Song dynasty in 960.

=== Origin of name ===
The name Wuyue comes from the combination of Wu Kingdom and Yue Kingdom, two ancient kingdoms during the Spring and Autumn period from 770 to 476 BC.

== Territorial extent ==
With its capital in Hangzhou, also called "Xifu", the kingdom included present-day Zhejiang, Shanghai, along with the southern portion of Jiangsu Province. It also later absorbed some of the northern part of Fujian when the Min Kingdom fell in 945. The territorial extent of Wuyue roughly corresponded to the territories of the ancient Yue, but not the ancient Wu—which led to charges by the neighboring Wu (also known as Southern Wu) that Wuyue had designs on its territory, and the name was a source of tension for years between the two states.

In the early decades of its existence, Wuyue bordered the Min Kingdom on its south and the Southern Tang Kingdom on its west and north. With the rebellion of Yin from the Min from 943 to 945, Wuyue briefly had a third border. However, before long, Wuyue was completely encircled (except for the East China Sea) as both Yin and Min were absorbed by the Southern Tang.

The population was approximately 550,700 households, with many people living in commercial centers and major seaports.

=== Administrative divisions ===
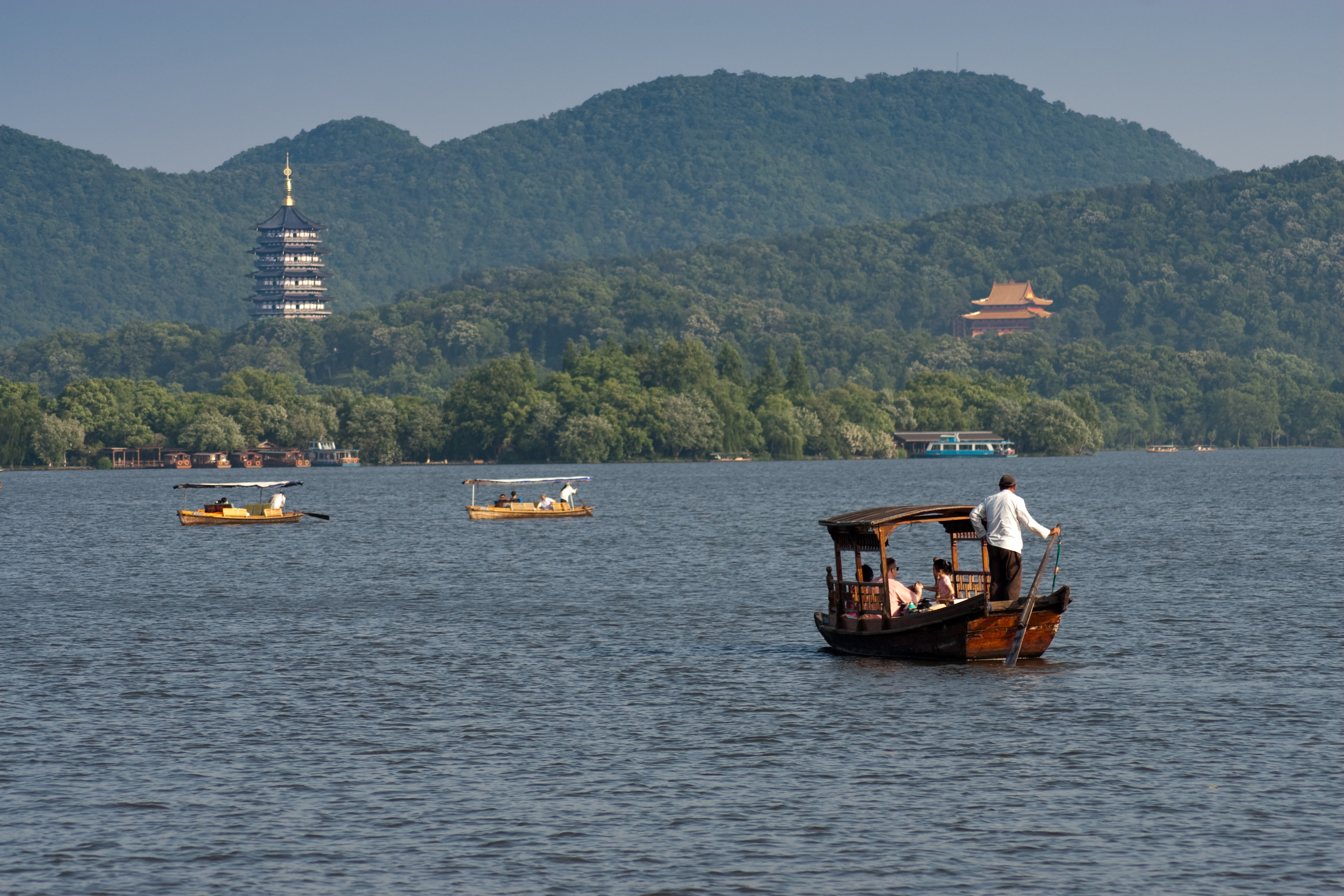
West Lake in Hangzhou

Wuyue was not a large kingdom compared to many of its neighbors. Although initially 12 prefectures (州), it later consisted of 13 prefectures and 86 counties or sub-prefectures (縣). Fuzhou was incorporated into Wuyue as its 13th prefecture, after the Min court declared allegiance to it as they were besieged by Southern Tang.

Prefecture	州	Counties	縣
Hangzhou (Xifu) (Note: main capital or western capital)	杭州		
Hangzhou (Xifu)	杭州	Qiantang	錢塘
Hangzhou (Xifu)	杭州	Qianjiang	錢江
Hangzhou (Xifu)	杭州	Yanguan	鹽官
Hangzhou (Xifu)	杭州	Yuhang	餘杭
Hangzhou (Xifu)	杭州	Fuchun	富春
Hangzhou (Xifu)	杭州	Tonglu	桐廬
Hangzhou (Xifu)	杭州	Yuqian	於潛
Hangzhou (Xifu)	杭州	Xindeng	新登
Hangzhou (Xifu)	杭州	Hengshan	橫山
Hangzhou (Xifu)	杭州	Wukang	武康
Yuezhou (Note: eastern capital; modern day Shaoxing)	越州		
Yuezhou	越州	Kuaiji	會稽
Yuezhou	越州	Shanyin	山陰
Yuezhou	越州	Zhuji	諸暨
Yuezhou	越州	Yuyao	餘姚
Yuezhou	越州	Xiaoshan	蕭山
Yuezhou	越州	Shangyu	上虞
Yuezhou	越州	Xinchang	新昌
Yuezhou	越州	Zhan	瞻縣
Huzhou	湖州		
Huzhou	湖州	Wucheng	烏程
Huzhou	湖州	Deqing	德清
Huzhou	湖州	Anji	安吉
Huzhou	湖州	Changxing	長興
Wenzhou	溫州		
Wenzhou	溫州	Yongjia	永嘉
Wenzhou	溫州	Rui'an	瑞安
Wenzhou	溫州	Pingyang	平陽
Wenzhou	溫州	Yueqing	樂清
Taizhou	台州		
Taizhou	台州	Linhai	臨海
Taizhou	台州	Huangyan	黃岩
Taizhou	台州	Taixing	台興
Taizhou	台州	Yong'an	永安
Taizhou	台州	Ninghai	寧海
Mingzhou (Note: modern day Ningbo and Zhoushan)	明州		
Mingzhou	明州	Yin County	鄞縣
Mingzhou	明州	Fenghua	奉化
Mingzhou	明州	Cixi	慈溪
Mingzhou	明州	Xiangshan	象山
Mingzhou	明州	Wanghai	望海
Mingzhou	明州	Wengshan	翁山
Chuzhou (Note: roughly modern day Lishui city)	處州		
Chuzhou	處州	Lishui	麗水
Chuzhou	處州	Longquan	龍泉
Chuzhou	處州	Suichang	遂昌
Chuzhou	處州	Jinyun	縉雲
Chuzhou	處州	Qingtian	青田
Chuzhou	處州	Bailong	白龍
Quzhou	衢州		
Quzhou	衢州	Xi'an (Note: not the capital)	西安
Quzhou	衢州	Jiangshan	江山
Quzhou	衢州	Longyou	龍游
Quzhou	衢州	Changshan	常山
Wuzhou (Note: roughly modern day Jinhua city)	婺州		
Wuzhou	婺州	Jinhua	金華
Wuzhou	婺州	Dongyang	東陽
Wuzhou	婺州	Yiwu	義烏
Wuzhou	婺州	Lanxi	蘭溪
Wuzhou	婺州	Yongkang	永康
Wuzhou	婺州	Wuyi	武義
Wuzhou	婺州	Pujiang	浦江
Muzhou (Note: roughly modern northwestern Zhejiang province)	睦州		
Muzhou	睦州	Jiande	建德
Muzhou	睦州	Shouchang	壽昌
Muzhou	睦州	Sui'an	遂安
Muzhou	睦州	Fenshui	分水
Muzhou	睦州	Qingxi	青溪
Xiuzhou (Note: roughly modern Shanghai and its surrounding environs, along with Jiaxing prefecture in Zhejiang province)	秀州		
Xiuzhou	秀州	Jiaxing	嘉興
Xiuzhou	秀州	Haiyan	海鹽
Xiuzhou	秀州	Huating	華亭
Xiuzhou	秀州	Chongde	崇德
Suzhou	蘇州		
Suzhou	蘇州	Wu County	吳縣
Suzhou	蘇州	Jinzhou	晉洲
Suzhou	蘇州	Kunshan	崑山
Suzhou	蘇州	Changshu	常熟
Suzhou	蘇州	Wujiang	吳江
Fuzhou (Note: acquired after the fall of Min)	福州		
Fuzhou	福州	Min County	閩縣
Fuzhou	福州	Houguan	侯官
Fuzhou	福州	Changle	長樂
Fuzhou	福州	Lianjiang	連江
Fuzhou	福州	Changxi	長溪
Fuzhou	福州	Fuqing	福清
Fuzhou	福州	Gutian	古田
Fuzhou	福州	Yongtai	永泰
Fuzhou	福州	Minqing	閩清
Fuzhou	福州	Yongzhen	永貞
Fuzhou	福州	Ningde	寧德
Anguo Yijin; Military Prefecture (Note: once called Yijin military prefecture)	安國衣錦軍 (衣錦軍)	Lin'an	臨安

Former Administrative Divisions

- Changzhou (常州) from 886 to 891 CE, ceded to Yang Xingmi
- Runzhou (潤州) from 886 to 891 CE, ceded to Yang Xingmi

== Reign of Qian Liu ==
Under Qian Liu's reign, Wuyue prospered economically and freely developed its own regional culture that continues to this day. He developed the coastal kingdom's agriculture, built seawalls, expanded Hangzhou, dredged rivers and lakes, and encouraged sea transport and trade. On his death-bed he urged a benign administration of state affairs and his words were strictly followed by four succeeding kings.

== Foreign diplomacy ==
In 935, Wuyue established official diplomatic relations with Japan. The kingdom also took advantage of its maritime location to maintain diplomatic contacts with north China, the Khitans, and the Korean states of Later Baekje, Balhae, Goryeo, and Silla. Buddhism played a large role in the diplomatic relations with Japan and Goryeo. Japanese and Korean monks traveled to Wuyue, while monks from Wuyue went to Japan and Korea as well. The rulers of Wuyue also tried to find sutras that had been lost during the turbulent final years of the Tang. In 947, Qian Zuo sent gifts to Japan and offered to buy any sutras; however none were available. In 961, Qian Chu sent fifty precious objects and a letter to Goryeo inquiring about the missing sutras, and Gwangjong sent the monk Jegwan (Chinese: 諦觀) with a complete set of Tiantai sutras.

== Fall of the kingdom ==
In 978, in the face of certain annihilation from northern imperial Chinese troops, the last king of Wuyue, Qian Chu, pledged allegiance to the Song dynasty, saving his people from war and economic destruction. While Qian Chu nominally remained king, Wuyue was absorbed into the Song dynasty, effectively ending the kingdom. The last king died in 988.

== Legacy ==
=== Cultural legacy ===
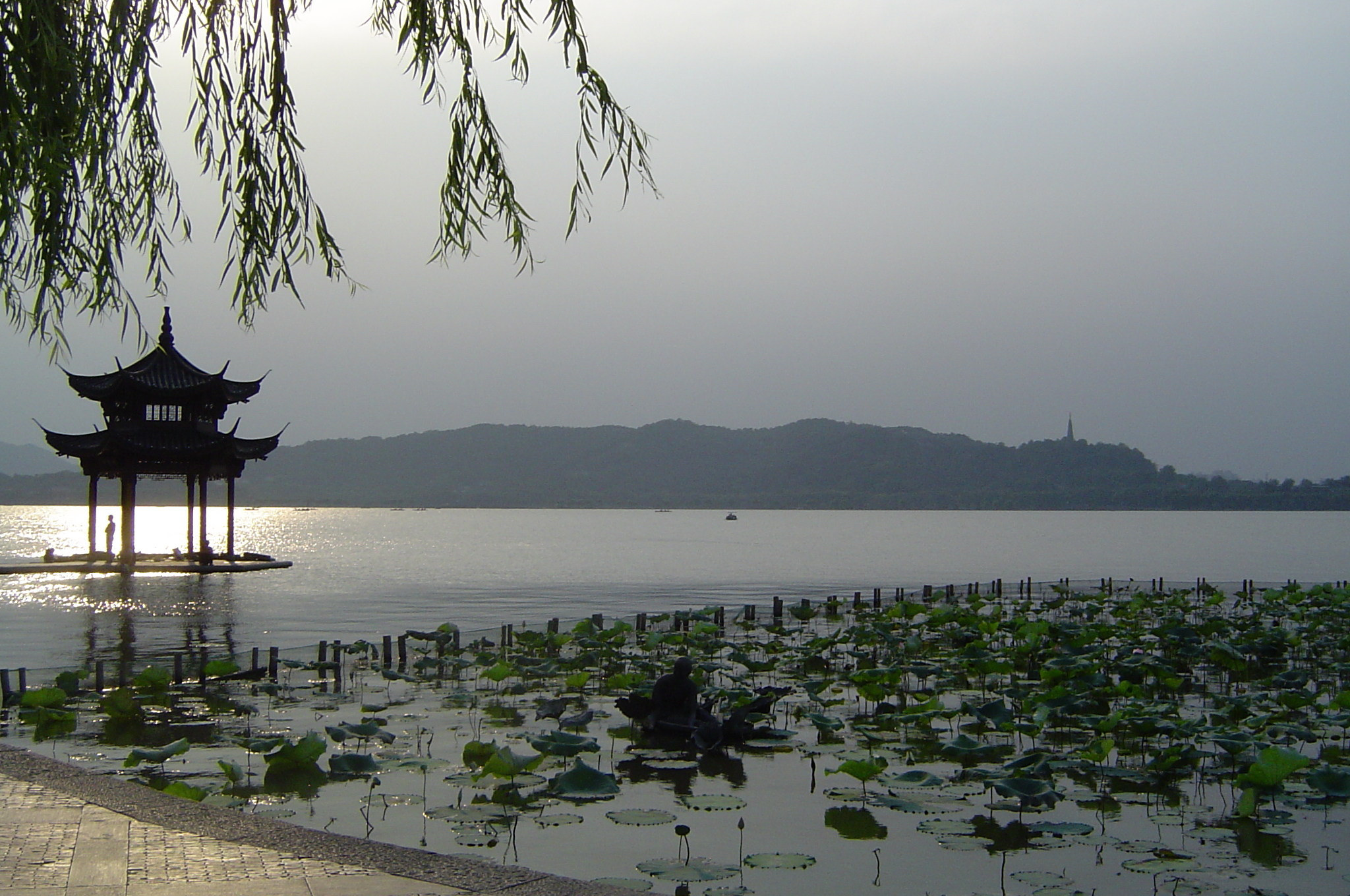
A section of the West Lake with the pavilion on the left that is said to mark the spot of an archery range in the Wuyue period.

The Wuyue Kingdom cemented the cultural and economic dominance of the Wuyue region in China for centuries to come, as well as creating a lasting regional cultural tradition distinctive from the rest of China. The leaders of the kingdom were noted patrons of Buddhism. The cultural distinctiveness preserved from the ancient Baiyue and earlier Wu and Yue Kingdoms persists to this day as the Wuyue region speaks a group of Chinese languages called Wu (the most famous variant of which is Shanghainese), has distinctive cuisine and other cultural traits.

=== Infrastructure ===
The primary physical legacy of the Wuyue Kingdom was the creation of the system of canals and dikes which allowed the region to become the most agriculturally rich region of China for many centuries. The leaders of the kingdom were also noted patrons of Buddhist architecture and sculpture, responsible for many of the region's continuing landmarks including the Liuhe, Leifeng, and Baochu Pagodas in Hangzhou and the leaning Tiger Hill Pagoda in Suzhou. The region's Tiantai School had already become prominent under the earlier Sui and Tang dynasties but the patronage of the Qian kings and Song emperors continued to make Jiangsu and Zhejiang's temples particularly influential within China and abroad, greatly influencing Korean and Japanese Buddhism and instructing many of their important monks.

The excellent condition of Hangzhou under this era and its people's loyalty to the Song directly led to its later use as the new imperial capital under the Southern Song. Under the early Song, the Qian royal family were treated as second only to the ruling Zhao imperial family, as reflected in the Hundred Family Surnames. Subsequently, many shrines were erected across the Wuyue region where the kings of Wuyue were memorialised and sometimes worshipped as dictating weather and agriculture. Many of these shrines remain today, the most prominent example being the Temple of the Qian Kings near West Lake in Hangzhou, erected with Song patronage and memorialized by stelas and placards by Su Dongpo, the Kangxi and Qianlong Emperors, and others.

=== Personal legacy ===
Qian Liu was often known as the "Dragon King" or the "Sea Dragon King" because of his extensive hydro-engineering schemes which "tamed" the seas. The kings of Wuyue continue to enjoy positive treatment in orthodox history. They were popularly revered because of the hydro-engineering works, ensuring the economic prosperity of the region, and for finally surrendering to the Song dynasty, which ensured both a unified Chinese nation and that the region would not be ravaged by war.

Qian Liu reputedly had more than a hundred sons born to many different wives and concubines. His progeny were posted to various parts of the kingdom. The Qian family remains very widely spread throughout the region. Several branches are considered "prominent families" (望族) in their local areas.

== Rulers ==
Sovereigns in Kingdom of Wuyue 907–978
Temple Names			Posthumous Names			Personal Names			Period of Reigns	Era Names and respective range of years
Chinese	Pinyin	Shanghainese	Chinese	Pinyin	Shanghainese	Chinese	Pinyin	Shanghainese		
太祖	Tài Zǔ	Tha Tsu	武肅王	Wǔ Sù Wáng	Vu Soh Waon	錢鏐	Qián Liú	Zi Leu	907–932	Tianyou (天祐): 907; Tianbao (天寶): 908–912; Fengli (鳳歷): 913; Qianhua (乾化): 913–915; Zhenming (貞明): 915–921; Longde (龍德): 921–923; Baoda (寶大): 924–925; Baozheng (寶正): 926–931
世宗	Shì Zōng	Sy Tson	文穆王	Wén Mù Wáng	Ven Moh Waon	錢元瓘 (錢傳瓘)	Qián Yuánguàn (Qián Chuánguàn)	Zi Nyoe Cioe (Zi Zoe Cioe)	932–941	Changxing (長興): 932–933; Yingshun (應順): 934; Qingtai (清泰): 934–936; Tianfu (天福): 936–941
成宗	Chéng Zōng	Zen Tson	忠獻王	Zhōng Xiàn Wáng	Tson Shie Waon	錢佐 (錢弘佐)	Qián Zuǒ (Qián Hóng Zuǒ)	Zi Tsu (Zi Ghon Tsu)	941–947	Tianfu (天福): 941–944; Kaiyun (開運): 944–946
Did not exist	N/A	N/A	忠遜王	Zhōng Xùn Wáng	Tson Sen Waon	錢倧 (錢弘倧)	Qián Zōng (Qián Hóng Zōng)	Zi Tson (Zi Ghon Tson)	947	Tianfu (天福): 947
Did not exist	N/A	N/A	忠懿王	Zhōng Yì Wáng	Tson I Waon	錢弘俶	Qián Chù (Qián Hóng Chù)	Zi Tsoh (Zi Ghon Tsoh)	947–978	Qianyou (乾祐): 948–950; Guangshun (廣順): 951–953; Xiande (顯德): 954–960; Jianlong (建隆): 960–963; Qiande (乾德): 963–968; Kaibao (開寶): 968–976; Taiping Xingguo (太平興國): 976–978

Qian Chu submitted to the Song dynasty in 978 and continued to reign nominally, successively as King of Huaihai, King of Hannan, King of Hanyang and Prince of Xu, and finally Prince of Deng, until his death in 988. After his death he was also posthumously created King of Qin.

== Rulers family tree ==
Wuyue rulers family tree

Qian Liu 錢鏐 850–932; Taìzǔ (太祖) r. 907–932^{1}
Qian Yuanguan 錢元瓘 887–941; Shìzōng (世宗) r. 932–941^{2}
Qian Hongzun 錢弘僔; 925–940	Qian Hongzuo 錢弘佐 928–947; Chéngzōng (成宗) r. 941–947^{3}	Qián Zōng 錢倧; 928–971 r. 947^{4}	Qian Chu 錢俶 929–988; Zhongyi (忠懿王) r. 947–978^{5}

== See also ==
- Qiantang River, for treatment of the Wuyue sea and flood walls
- Hundred Family Surnames, a Song-era list particularly honoring Wuyue royalty
- Temple of the Qian Kings in Hangzhou, Zhejiang
