= Swan maiden =

Mythical female creature

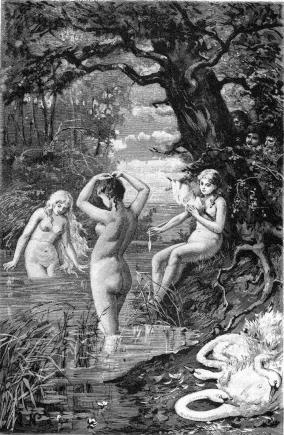
In the Völundarkviða, Wayland Smith and his brothers marry valkyries who dress in swan skins.

The "swan maiden" (German: Schwanjungfrau) is a tale classified as ATU 400, "The Swan Maiden" or "The Man on a Quest for His Lost Wife", in which a man makes a pact with, or marries, a supernatural female being who later departs. The wife shapeshifts from human to bird form with the use of a feathered cloak (or otherwise turns into a beast by donning animal skin). The discussion is sometimes limited to cases in which the wife is specifically a swan, a goose, or at least some other kind of bird, as in Enzyklopädie des Märchens.

The key to the transformation is usually a swan skin, or a garment with swan feathers attached.

In the typical story, a maiden is (usually bathing) in some body of water, a man furtively steals, hides, or burns her feather garment (motif K 1335, D 361.1), which prevents her from flying away (or swimming away, etc.), forcing her to become his wife. (Note: Type II of three types, in A. T. Hatto (1961).) She is often one of several maidens present (often celestial beings), and often it is the youngest who gets captured. The bird wife eventually leaves this husband in many cases.

The oldest narrative example of this type is Chinese, recorded in the Sou shen ji ("In Search of the Supernatural", 4th century), etc.

There are many analogues around the world, notably the Völundarkviða and Grimms' Fairy Tales KHM 193 "The Drummer". There are also many parallels involving creatures other than swans.

== Scope of definition ==
The "swan maiden" here may more generally be rephrased as "bird-maiden", as its identity may be that of the swan, goose or crane, as is usually the case or a duck or heron (as in South American examples), or doves, or vultures, parrots and such non-migratory birds. (Note: Berezkin (2010), p. 34, (2013) apud d'Huy (2023).) And since tale type ATU 400 is "The Man on a Quest for His Lost Wife," it could involve a broad spectrum of supernatural creatures: also as stars, celestial nymphs, or a fée of the lake. (Note: As in the example of an Occitan tale with many variants.)

Russian folklorist Eleazar M. Meletinskii had studied the human-animal marriage tradition extensively, which in the past had been categorized under "swan maiden", but this would excessively broaden the scope of this topic.

The swan maiden tales could also fall under the broader scope of "Magic Wife". The "Magic Wife" motif in the broad sense is one of the most widely distributed motifs in the world, most probably being many millennia old, (Note: Berezkin (2010) and d'Huy which cites it.) (Note: Hatto admits narrative from China to be the oldest, c. 300CE, but as a possible precursor suggests a story from the Ṛg Veda.) and the best known supernatural wife figure in narratives. This motif is one of the most interconnected and centrally referred to among all the other stories. (Note: d'Huy (2019) and d'Huy (2023))

(Cf. § Folkloristics for further details).

== Medieval legends ==
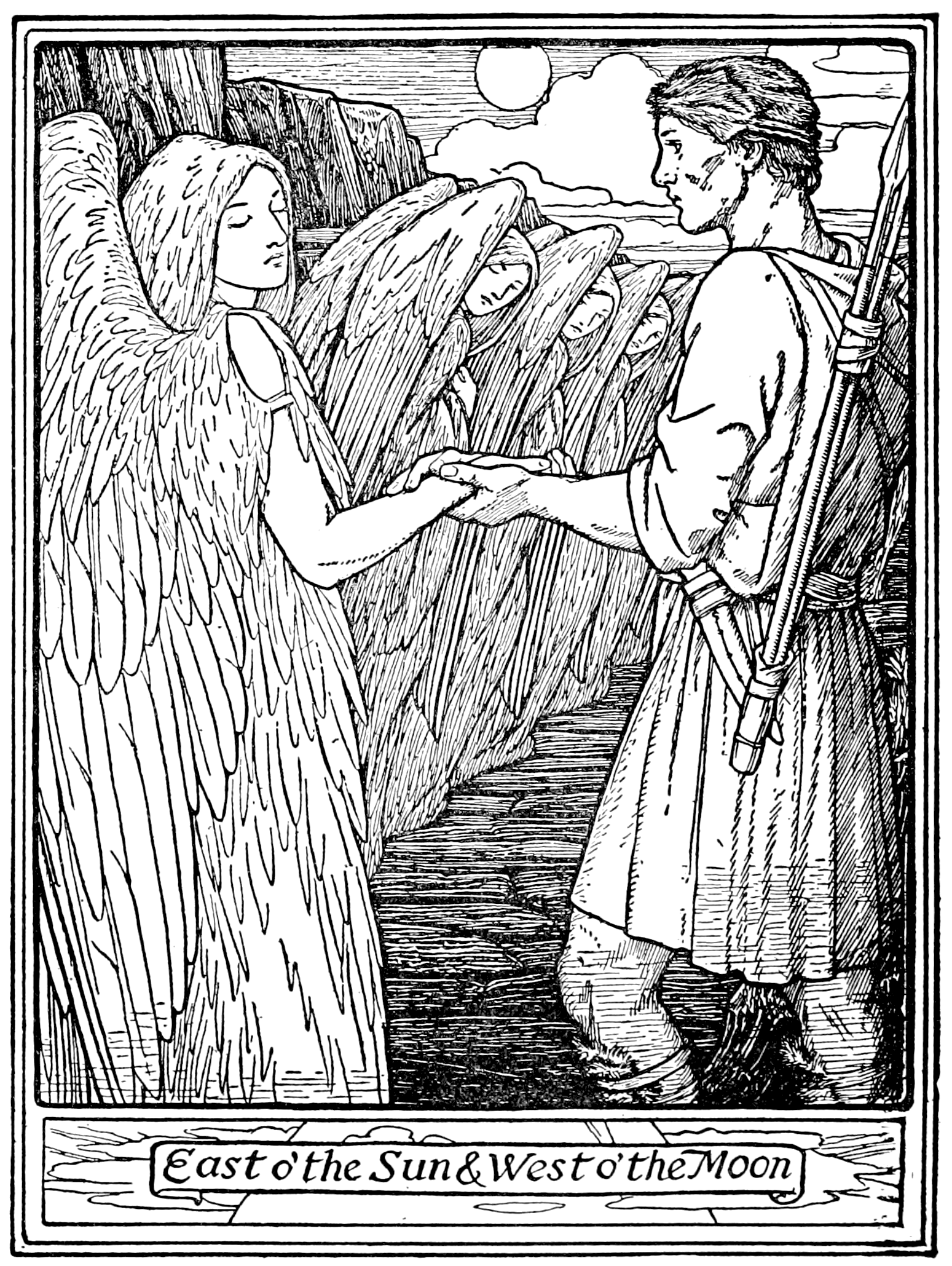
The hunter recognizes his bride amongst the parade of identical maidens. Illustration from Jacobs's Europa's Fairy Book by John D. Batten

=== Germanic legend ===
In Germanic mythology, the character of the swan maiden is associated with "multiple Valkyries", a trait already observed by Jacob Grimm in his book Deutsche Mythologie (Teutonic Mythology). Like the international legend, their magic swan-shirt allows their avian transformation.

In Germanic heroic legend, the stories of Wayland the Smith describe him as falling in love with Swanhilde, a Swan Maiden, who is the daughter of a marriage between a mortal woman and a fairy king, who forbids his wife to ask about his origins; on her asking him, he vanishes. Swanhilde and her sisters, however, can fly as swans. But wounded by a spear, Swanhilde falls to earth and is rescued by the master-craftsman Wieland, and marries him, putting aside her wings and her magic ring of power. Wieland's enemies, the Neidings, under Princess Bathilde, steal the ring, kidnap Swanhilde, and destroy Wieland's home. When Wieland searches for Swanhilde, they entrap and cripple him. However, he fashions wings for himself and escapes with Swanhilde as the house of the Neidings is destroyed.

Another tale concerns the valkyrie Brynhild. In the Völsunga saga, King Agnar withholds Brynhild's magical swan shirt, thus forcing her into his service as his enforcer.

A third tale with a valkyrie is the story of Kára and Helgi Haddingjaskati, attested in the Kara-lied. A similarly named character with a swanshift appears in Hrómundar saga Gripssonar, where she helps her lover Helgi.

=== China ===
The oldest attestation of the archetypal swan maiden narrative recorded anywhere in the world comes from China, dating to c. 300[?] or later. The story is preserved in Guo Pu's Xuan zhong ji (玄中記, "Records from Inside the Mysterious") as well as Gan Bao (d. 336)'s Sou shen ji (In Search of the Supernatural (cf. Feather cloak § China). In the Sou shen ji version, a man from Xinyu town (新喩縣) in Yuzhang Area (present-day Jiangxi Province) steals the feather cloak (Note: It is noted that the term used here is maoyi 毛衣 literally "hair garment", even though the terminology yuyi 羽衣 literally "feather garment" has preexisted in ancient writings such as the Shiji.) from among the 6 or 7 bird maidens he witnesses, and forces her to be his wife. (Note: Chinese text of Sou shen ji, followed by Japanese vs. English translation by Kai.) (Note: Fu blockquotes the Xuan zhong ji version, and then explains the textual difference in the Sou shen ji version.) This "feather garment" tale type is considered a subtype of the broader swan maiden tale type, and has cognate tales distributed all over the world.

In later periods, a story is found among the Dunhuang manuscripts which veers close to the general Swan Maiden tale: a poor man named T'ien K'un-lun approaches a lake where three crane maidens are bathing.

=== Japan ===
The swan maiden type narrative is found in medieval Japanese literature as well, specifically in the Ōmi fudoki where the heavenly woman (tennyo) has her feather garment (hagoromo) taken away by a man and is forced to marry him. In a different tale found in the Tango fudoki, the heavenly woman has her garment hidden away; she has no choice but to become an adoptive daughter of a childless couple.

=== In Irish Sagas ===
Clearly, the best-known story of transformation into swans in Middle Irish narrative occurs in the Oidheadh chloinne Lir ("The Sorrows of the Children of Lir"), this work being counted among the "Three Sorrows of Storytelling".

Other Irish medieval narratives touch on woman-bird transformation, and there is also some lore regarding feather robes (cf. Feather cloak § Celtic), but they don't coalesce together, viz.:

The swan is said to be the preferred form adopted by Celtic goddesses. Even in this form, their otherworldly nature is identifiable by a golden or silver chain hanging around their neck.

In the Irish Mythological Cycle of stories, in the tale of The Wooing of Étaine, a similar test involving the recognition of the wife among lookalikes happens to Eochu Airem, when he has to find his beloved Étaine, who flew away in the shape of a swan.

A second Irish tale of a maiden changing into a swan is the story of hero Óengus, who falls in love with Caer Ibormeith, in a dream. When he finds her, Caer is in swan form, wearing a golden chain, and accompanied by 150 maidservants also in swan form, each pair bound with a silver chain.

In another tale, relating to the birth of hero Cú Chulainn, a flock of birds, "joined in pairs by silver chains", appear and guide the Ulstermen to a house, where a woman was about to give birth. In one account, the birds were Cu Chulainn's mother, Deichtire, and her maidens.

== Modern collected oral folklore ==
Scholarship has remarked that the Swan Maiden appears "throughout the ancient Celtic lands".

On the other hand, researcher Maria Tatar points out that the "Swan Maiden" tale is "widespread in Nordic regions".

Scholar Lotte Motz contrasted its presence in different geographical regions. According to her study, she appears as a fairy tale character in "more southern countries", whereas "in northern regions", she becomes a myth and "an element of faith".

=== East Asia ===
According to professor Alan Miller, the swan maiden tale is "one of the most popular of all Japanese folktales". Likewise, scholar Manabu Waida asserted the popularity of the tale "in Korea, Manchuria and China", as well as among "the Buryat, Ainu and Annamese".

=== Chinese oral tales ===
A tale from Southeastern China and nearby regions narrates the adventures of a prince who meets a Peacock Maiden, attributed to the Tai people. The tale is celebrated amongst the Dai people of China and was recorded as a poem and folk story, being known under several names, such as "Shaoshutun", "The Peacock Princess" or "Zhao Shutun and Lanwuluona".

In a Chinese tale titled The Seven Snow-White Cranes, a scholar is walking somewhere on a bright day, when seven cranes begin to fly down to the ground near him. The man hides behind some bushes and sees the cranes alighting near a pond, then taking off their feather garments to become human maidens. As they play and frolic in the water, the scholar steals the garments of one of the crane maidens, who pick up their featherskins, turn back into cranes, and fly away, save for one of them. The scholar appears to her and brings her home to be his wife. They have a son the next year, but the maiden still longs for the skies. One day, a maidservant takes all the clothes inside the house and places them in the sun, along with the crane garments, which were hidden in a camphor chest. The crane maiden finds her garments and, with great joy, turns back into a crane and goes back to the heavens. Years pass, and their son grows up being mocked for not having a mother. He asks his scholar father where he can see his mother, and the man tells him to go to a certain hill and shout for a passing flock of seven cranes. The boy does as instructed, and the crane maiden meets her son in human form. The boy asks her to come back, which she cannot do, but, in return, gives him a magic gourd.

=== Chinese minorities ===
In a Chuan Miao tale, An Orphan Enjoyed Happiness, and His Father-in-law Deceived Him, but His Sons Recovered Their Mother, an orphan gathers wood in the forest and burns the dead trees to make way for a clearing. He also builds a well. One day, seven wild ducks light on the water. The orphan asks someone named "Ye Seo" about the ducks, who answers that the youth they are his fortune and that he must secure a "spotted feather" from their wings. The next day, the youth hides near the well when the ducks arrive and plucks the spotted feather, which belongs to an older woman. He goes back to Ye Seo, who tells him he needs to get a white feather, not a spotted one, nor a black one. He fetches the correct feather this time, and a young woman appears to become his wife. They marry, and she gives birth to twin boys. For some time, both children cry whenever their mother is at home, until one day she asks them why they are sad. They explain that their human father is hiding their mother's feather somewhere in the house and wears it on his head when she is not at home. She finds the feather, puts it on her head, and flies away from home. The boys' human father scolds them and sends them to seek their mother.

The swan maiden appears in a tale from the Yao people of China.

In a tale from the Kachari, Sā-se phālāngī gotho-nī khorāng ("The story of the merchant lad"), an orphaned youth decides to earn his living in foreign lands. He buys goods and a boat, and hires some help. He and his crew arrive at another country, where an old couple lives with their pet swan. One day, the youth sees the swan transform into a maiden and becomes enamoured. He buys the swan from the old couple in hopes it will turn back into a girl, but no such luck. The youth pines away with longing, and his mother is worried. A wise woman advises the mother and son to prepare a mixture of ashes and oil, procure a yak's tail, and pretend to fall asleep at night. The swan takes off her animal clothing and, as a human, begins to "worship her country's gods". The youth awakes, takes the plumage, and tosses it in the fire. The maiden faints, but the youth uses the mixture on her and fans her with the yak's tail. She awakens and marries the human, giving birth to many children.

=== Turkic peoples ===
Scholarship points out that, in some Turkic peoples of Northern Asia, the swan appears as their ancestress (cf. § Swan maiden as ancestress). One example is Khubai-khatun (Хубай-хатун), who shows up in the Yakut olonkho of Art-toyon. Etymological connections between Khubai-khatun (previously Khubashi) and Mongolic/Buryat Khoboshi have been noted, suggesting "great antiquity" and possible cultural transmission between peoples.

Scholarship also lists Homay/Humai, the daughter of the King of the Birds, Samrau, in Ural-batyr, the Bashkir epic, as another swan maiden. She appears in folklore as a divine being, daughter of heavenly deity Samrau, and assumes the shape of a bird with solar characteristics.

The swan also appears in an ethnogenetic myth of the Yurmaty tribe as the companion of a human hunter.

In a Tatar oral epic Kartaga Mergän, there appears the character of The Swan-Women, Tjektschäkäi, who develops an inimical relationship with hero Kartaga Mergän.

=== Mongolic peoples ===
Among the Buryat, the swan maiden ancestress marries a human man and gives birth to eleven sons, the founders of the future clans of the Khori: Galzuud, Khargana, Khuasai, Khubduud, Baganai, Sharait, Bodonguud, Gushad, Sagan, Khuudai, and Khalbin (cf. § Swan maiden as ancestress). In this ancestor myth, the human hunter is called Hori Tumed (Хорь Тумэд); the flock of birds has nine swans, and the swan mother gives names to her 11 sons. This is considered to be a "popular genealogical myth", since the protagonist shows variations in his name: Horidai Mergen, Khori, Khorildoi, Khorodoi, Khoreldoi, Khoridoi. The name of legendary swan ancestress of the Khorin is given as Hoboshi (Хобоши).

In one version of an ancestor myth from the Transbaikal Buryats, collected by Jeremiah Curtin in the 19th century, a hunter sees three swans alight near a lake to bathe. They take off their feathers to become young women, daughters of Esege Malan. While they are distracted, the human hunter hides the feathers of one of them, stranding her on Earth. They marry and have six children. One day, she prepares some tarasun for her husband, who, after drinking too much, is convinced by his wife to return her feathers. When she dons them, she once again becomes a swan and returns to the skies, but one of her daughters tries to stop her.

A version of the Khoridai tale with the swan maiden is also attested among the Barga Mongols. The hunter Khoridai marries a swan maiden, and she and another wife give birth to 11 ancestors.

The hunter named Hori (and variations) most often appears as the husband of the swan maiden. However, other ethnogenic myths of the Buryats associate him as the swan maiden's son. According to scholarship, four Buryat lines (Khongodor, Horidoy, Khangin, and Sharaid) trace their origins to a marriage between a human hunter and a swan woman named Khurmast-tenger (Хурмаст-тэнгэр); the Zakamensk Buryats tell the story of three brothers, Hori, Shosholok, and Khongodor, born of a swan maiden.

Among the Khongodor, a genealogical myth tells that the young man Senkhele (Сэнхэлэ) marries the swan maiden (heavenly maiden, in other accounts) Khenkhele-khatan (Хэнхэлэ-хатан); from their union, 9 ancestors are born. Similar stories are located among the Khongodor of Tunka, Alar, and Zakamen.

A similar myth about a swan ancestress is attested with the Oirats, about a human hunter and his wife, the swan maiden, who represents the heavenly realm (Tengri).

In another Buryat ethnogenetic myth, the human ancestor is a hunter named Barγutai. One day, he sees seven maidens bathing in a lake and steals the garments of one of them. Six of the maidens wear their garments, become swans and take to the skies again, while the youngest of them is left behind, without her clothing. The hunter finds and consoles her, and they both marry. Eleven children are born of this union. She eventually regains her clothing and returns to the skies.

The swan maiden appears in a tale about the origin of the Daghur people. In this tale, titled The Fairies and the Hunters, a mother lives with her two sons, Kurugure and Karegure. One day, when they are away on a hunt, she is visited by two "female celestials" who take off their feather clothing. Both women help the old mother with her chores and fly away. The old mother tells her sons the story. The next time the celestial women appear, the brothers burn their feather clothing and marry them.

Further scholarship also locates similar tales of the swan ancestress among the Buryat populations. In the Sharayt clan's telling, nine swan maidens fly to Lake Khangai to bathe in the river; the hunter's name is Sharayhai. In other tellings, the swan maidens number thirteen, and the meeting with the hunter occurs by the river Kalenga, the river Lena, by Lake Baikal, or by Olkhon Island.

=== Irish folktale ===
In a Scottish tale (Scottish Gaelic: Mac an Tuathanaich a Thàinig a Raineach, lit. 'The Farmer's son who came from Rannoch'), the farmer's son sees three swan maidens bathing in water; he hides their clothing, in exchange for the youngest of them (sisters, in all) to marry him.

In the Irish fairy tale The Three Daughters of the King of the East and the Son of a King in Erin, three swan maidens come to bathe in a lake (Loch Erne) and converse with a king's elder son, who was fishing at the lake. His evil stepmother convinces a young cowherd to stick a magic pin in the prince's clothes to make him fall asleep. The spell works twice, and on both occasions, the swan maidens try to help the prince come to. A similar narrative is the Irish tale The Nine-Legged Steed.

In another Irish tale, The House in the Lake, a man named Enda helps Princess Mave, who has been turned into a swan, break the curse her evil stepmother cast upon her.

In another tale, goddess Áine, metamorphosed into a swan, was bathing in the lake and was seen by a human duke, Gerald Fitzgerald (Gearóid Iarla), who felt a passionate yearning towards her. Aware of the only way to make her his wife, the duke seized Áine's fairy cloak. Once subdued and deprived of her magic cloak, she resigned to being the human's wife, and they had a son.

In a local legend in the barony of Inchiquin, County Clare, before the O'Briens took the lands of the Clann-Ifearnain, the young chieftain O'Quin follows a stag to the shore of Loch Inchiquin and sees five swans near the water. The five swans take off their swan skins and become maidens. O'Quin steals the garments of one of them; the other turns back into swans and departs, leaving their companion to her fate. The captured swan maiden is wooed by the O'Quin man, until she concedes to marry him, on two conditions: their marriage must be kept a secret, and that no man from Clann-Brian must be under their roof, lest she disappear and the man becomes the last of his clan. O'Quin and the swan maiden live seven happy years of marriage, with two children born to them, until a fateful day: O'Quin meets a member of the O'Brien clan and invites him to his castle. He entertains his guest and gambles against him all his worldly goods and possessions, and loses. Remembering his wife's prediction, O'Quin goes to her room and sees her transform into a swan, with their two children metamorphosed into cygnets. The swan mother and her children fly away to the mists of the lake, and are seen no more - thus ending the O'Quin line. At least 9 accounts of the legend exist: in three of them, the supernatural wife is explicitly a swan maiden. In other accounts, the O'Brien of the legend is identified with Tyge Ahood (or Tadhg an Chomhaid) O'Brien, Prince of Thomond. The number of swans may also vary between tellings: five, seven, or a general "number" of them.

=== Welsh tales ===
Author Marie Trevelyan stated that the swan appears in Welsh tradition, sometimes "closely connected" to fairies. She also provided a summary of a tale from Whitmore Bay, Barry Island, in Glamorgan, which she claimed was "well known in the early part of the nineteenth century". In this story, a young farmer, working in a field near the sea, sees a swan alighting near a stone; the bird sheds its feathers, becomes a woman, bathes for a while, then returns to the skies as a bird. This goes on for some time, until the farmer decides to hide the swan feathers the next time the woman goes to bathe in the lake. Thus it happens, and the swan woman begs for her feathers back, but the farmer refuses. They eventually marry, and he hides the featherskin in a locked oaken chest. One day, the man forgets to lock his chest; the swan woman gets her feathers back and flies away from their home as a swan. The farmer returns home just in time to see her departure, and dies of a broken heart.

In another tale provided by Marie Trevelyan, a man from Rhoose visits his friend in Cadoxton-juxta-Barry, at Barry Island. "Back then," as this tale goes, Barry Island was only reachable at low tide. Both friends spend some time together and lose track of time, when the tide has risen high enough to block their return. Both decide to pass by Friar's Point. There, they see two swans alighting and becoming two women by taking off their swan skins. Both men decide to steal the women's skins. Both women beg for the skins and feathers back, but the men deny their request. Then each swan woman marries a man. A wagon runs over the wife of the man from Cadoxton, and when people come to pick her corpse, she becomes a swan and flies away. As for the other man, after seven years of marriage, the man throws away some rubbish in the farmyard, the swan wings among them. The wife finds them, puts them back, and flies away as a swan.

=== Western Continental Europe ===
Flemish fairy tale collections also contain two tales with the presence of the Swan Maiden: De Koning van Zevenbergen ("The King of Sevenmountains") and Het Zwanenmeisje van den glazen Berg ("The Swan Maiden from the Glass Mountain"). Johannes Bolte, in a book review of Pol de Mont and Alfons de Cock's publication, noted that their tale was parallel to Grimms' KHM 193, The Drummer.

In an Iberian tale (The Seven Pigeons), a fisherman spots a black-haired girl combing her hair in the rocks. Upon the approach of two pigeons, she finishes her grooming activity and turns into a swan wearing a crown on her head. When the three birds land on a nearby ship, they regain their human forms as maidens.

In a Belgian fairy tale, reminiscent of the legend of the Knight of the Swan, The Swan Maidens and the Silver Knight, seven swans – actually seven princesses cursed into that form – plot to help the imprisoned princess Elsje, with the Silver Knight's help. Princess Elsje, of her own accord, wants to help the seven swan sisters regain her human form by knitting seven coats and staying silent all the while for the enchantment to work.

=== German märchen ===
A version of the plot of the Swan Maiden (Schwanenjungfrau) happens in Swabian tale The Three Swans (Von drei Schwänen): a widowed hunter, guided by an old man of the woods, secures the magical garment of the swan-maiden and marries her. Fifteen years pass, and his second wife finds her swan coat and flies away. The hunter trails after her and reaches a castle, where his wife and her sisters live. The swan-maiden tells him that he must pass through arduous trials in the castle for three nights to break the curse cast upon the women. The motif of staying overnight in an enchanted castle echoes the tale of The Youth who wanted to learn what Fear was (ATU 326).

In the German tale collected by Johann Wilhelm Wolf (German: Von der schönen Schwanenjungfer; English: The tale of the beautiful swan maiden), a hunter in France sights a swan in a lake who pleads not to shoot her. The swan also reveals that she is a princess, and to break her curse, he must endure dangerous trials in a castle.

In a tale collected in Wimpfen, near the river Neckar (Die drei Schwäne), a youth was resting by the edge of a lake when he sighted three snow-white swans. He fell asleep, and when he woke, he found himself in a great palace. He was then greeted by three fairy women (presumably the swans).

=== Eastern Europe ===
Czech author Bozena Nemcova published a tale titled Zlatý vrch ("The Golden Hill"), wherein Libor, a poor youth, lives with his widowed mother in a house in the woods. He finds work under the tutelage of the royal gardener. One day, while resting near a pond, he notices some noise nearby. Spying out of the bushes, he sees three maidens bathing, the youngest of them the loveliest of them. They don their white robes and "floating veils", become swans, and fly away. The next day, Libor hides the veil of the youngest, named Čekanka. The youth convinces her to become his wife and gives her a veil to hide behind. One day, the swan maiden tricks Libor's mother into returning her veil and tells Libor that he must venture to the Golden Hill if he ever wants her back. With the help of a crow and some stolen magical objects from giants, he reaches the Golden Hill, where Cekanka lives with her sisters and their witch mother. The witch sets three dangerous tasks for Libor, which he accomplishes with his beloved's help. The third is to identify Cekanka in a room with similarly dressed maidens. He succeeds. The pair decides to escape from Golden Hill as the witch mother goes hot on their trail. Transforming into different things, they elude their pursuer and return home.

=== Romanian folktale ===
The character of the swan-maiden also appears in an etiological tale from Romania about the origin of the swan. In the same book, by professor Moses Gaster, he translated a Romanian "Christmas carol" with the same theme, and noted that the character "occurs very often" in Romania.

=== Russian byliny and skazka ===
The character of the "White Swan" appears in Russian oral poetry and functions similarly to the vila of South Slavic folklore. Scholarship suggests the term may refer to a foreign princess, most likely of Polish origin.

Another occurrence of the motif appears in the Russian folktale Sweet Mikáilo Ivánovich the Rover: Mikailo Ivanovich goes hunting and, when he aims at a white swan, it pleads for its life. Then, the swan transforms into a lovely maiden, Princess Márya, whom Mikail falls in love with.

In a Russian bylina or heroic poem, a character named White Swan (Byelaya Lebed'), whose real name may be Avdotya or Marya, appears as the traitorous love interest of the hero.

In a tale featuring heroic bogatyr Alyosha Popovich, Danilo the Luckless, the titular Danilo the Luckless, a nobleman, meets a "Granny" (an old and wise woman), who points him to the blue ocean. When the water swells, a creature named Chudo-Yudo shall appear, and Danilo must seize it and use it to summon the beautiful Swan Maiden.

In a Kalmyk tale, Tsarkin Khan and the Archer, an Archer steals the robe of a "golden-crowned" swan maiden when she was in human form and marries her. Later, the titular Tsarkin Khan wants to marry the Archer's swan maiden wife and plans to get rid of him by setting dangerous tasks.

=== Swedish fairy tale ===
In a Swedish fairy tale, The Swan-Maiden, the king announces a great hunting contest. A young hunter sights a swan swimming in a lake and aims at it, but the swan pleads not to shoot it. The swan transforms into a maiden and explains she is enchanted into that form, but the hunter may help her break the spell.

In another Swedish fairy tale collected from Blekinge, The Swan Maiden, a young hunter sees three swans approaching a sound and shedding their animal skins. They reveal themselves to be three lovely maidens, and he falls in love with one of them. He returns home and tells his mother he intends to marry one of them. She advises him to hide the maiden's feather garment. He does that the next day and wins a wife for himself. Seven years later, now settled into domestic life, the hunter tells the truth to the swan maiden and returns her feather garment. She changes back into a swan and flies off. The human husband dies a year later.

=== Finnish folktale ===
The usual plot involves a magical bird-maiden who descends from the heavens to bathe in a lake. However, there are variants where the maiden and/or her sisters are princesses under a curse, such as in the Finnish story Vaino and the Swan Princess.

=== Native American folktale ===
A Native American tale features the Red Swan, a bird of reddish plumage. The bird attracts the attention of a young warrior, who goes on a quest to find her.

== Swan maiden motif tales in broader scope ==
=== Helper ===
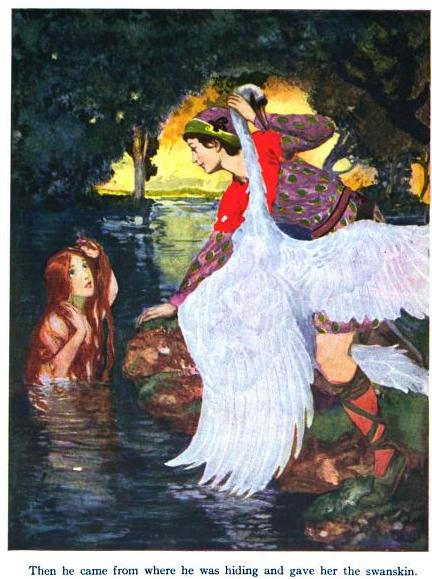
The King of Ireland's oldest son returns the swanskin to Fedelma, the Enchanter's Daughter. Illustration by Willy Pogány for Padraic Colum's The King of Ireland's Son (1916).

Another type of tale that involves the swan maiden is type ATU 313, "The Magic Flight" (cf. feather cloak), where the character helps the hero against an antagonist. It can be the maiden's mistress, e. g., a witch, as in a tale published by illustrator Howard Pyle in The Wonder Clock, or the maiden's father, e. g., the character of Morskoi Tsar in Russian fairy tales. In this second format, the hero of the tale spies on the bird (swan) maidens bathing and hides the garment (featherskin) of the youngest one, for her to help him reach the kingdom of the villain of the tale (usually the swan-maiden's father).

In the Scottish story titled "The Tale of the Son of the King of Ireland and the Daughter of the King of the Red Cap" (Scottish Gaelic: Sgeulachd air Mac Righ Éirionn agus Nighean Rígh a' Churraichd Ruaidh), the prince of Ireland falls in love with the White Swan of the Smooth Neck, also called Sunshine, the young daughter of the King of the Red Cap, as he saw her coming to bathe in a lake.

In a Flemish fairy tale, Het zwanenmeisje van den glazen berg ("The Swan Maiden of the Glass Mountain"), a young hunter fetches the swan garment of a bathing maiden, who asks for it in return. When she wears it, she tells the hunter to find her in the Glass Mountain. After he succeeds in climbing the mountain, the youth recognizes his beloved swan maiden and asks her mother for her daughter's hand in marriage. The mother assures the human that he will be able to marry her daughter after doing three difficult chores.

In an Evenk tale titled The Grateful Eagle, the hero is promised to an old man after he helps his father close a magical casket. Years later, the hero finds three swan maidens bathing in the river and fetches the robe of one of them. She insists the boy return it and tells him to pay a visit to her village, where the older man also lives. Soon after arriving, he goes to the old man's house and is attended by "a pretty maid", later revealed to be the old man's granddaughter.

=== Simple bird transformation ===
Some may consider it a class of tales, any story involving a bird-maiden as a single element. This has been cursorily named a Type I "swan maiden" tale type by Hatto.

19th-century folkloristic publications mentioned a tale about Grace's Well, a well whose caretaker's carelessness led to her being turned into a swan by the fairies. The well was reported to be near Glasfryn lake, somewhere in Wales.

=== Alternate openings ===
Romanian folklorist Marcu Beza drew attention to two other introductory episodes: (1) seven white birds steal the golden apples from a tree in the king's garden (an episode similar to German The Golden Bird), or they come and trample the fields; (2) the hero receives a key and, against his master's wishes, opens a forbidden chamber, where the bird maidens are bathing.

Researcher Barbara Fass Leavy noted a variation of the first opening episode described above, which occurs in Scandinavian tales: a man's third or only son stands guard on his father's fields at night to discover what has been trampling them; he sees three maidens dancing in a meadow.

As for the second episode, it may be known as "The Forbidden Chamber", in folkloristic works. Edwin Sidney Hartland indicated the occurrence of the second opening episode in tales from Arabic folklore.

=== Alternative endings ===
In some versions, although the children may grieve her, she does not take them with her.

=== Male versions ===
The fairytale "The Six Swans" could be considered a male version of the swan maiden, where the swan skin isn't stolen but a curse, similar to The Swan Princess. An evil stepmother cursed her 6 stepsons with swan-skin shirts that transform them into swans, which can only be cured by 6 nettle shirts made by their younger sister. Similar tales of a parent or a step-parent cursing their (step)children are the Irish legend of The Children of Lir, and The Wild Swans, a literary fairy tale by Danish author Hans Christian Andersen.

An inversion of the story (humans turning into swans) can be found in the Dolopathos: a hunter sights a (magical) maiden bathing in a lake and, after a few years, she gives birth to septuplets (six boys and a girl), born with gold chains around their necks. After being expelled by their grandmother, the children bathe in a lake in their swan forms and return to human form thanks to their magical chains.

Another story of a male swan is Prince Swan (Prinz Schwan), an obscure tale collected by the Brothers Grimm in the very first edition of their Kinder- und Hausmärchen (1812), but removed from subsequent editions.

Czech author Božena Němcová included in the first volume of her collection National Tales and Legends, published in 1845, a tale she titled The Swan (O Labuti), about a prince who's turned into a swan by a witch because his evil stepmother wanted to get rid of him.

Brazilian tale Os três cisnes ("The Three Swans"), collected by Lindolfo Gomes, tells the story of a princess who marries an enchanted prince. After his wife breaks a taboo (he could never see himself in a mirror), he turns into a swan, which prompts his wife on a quest for his whereabouts, with the help of an old woodcutter.

== Literary fairy tales (Kunstmärchen) and other works ==
The Swan Maiden story is believed to have been the basis for the ballet Swan Lake, in which a young princess, Odette, and her maidens are under the spell of an evil sorcerer, Von Rothbart, who transforms them into swans by day. By night, they regain their human forms and can only be rescued if a young man swears eternal love and faithfulness to the Princess. When Prince Siegfried swears his love for Odette, the spell can be broken, but Siegfried is tricked into declaring his love for Von Rothbart's daughter, Odile, disguised by magic as Odette, and all seems lost. But the spell is finally broken when Siegfried and Odette drown themselves in a lake of tears, uniting them in death for all eternity. While the ballet's revival of 1895 depicted the swan-maidens as mortal women cursed to turn into swans, the original libretto of 1877 depicted them as true swan-maidens: fairies who could transform into swans at will. Several animated films based on the ballet, including The Swan Princess and Barbie of Swan Lake, depict the lead heroines as being under a spell and their Princes eventually rescue both.

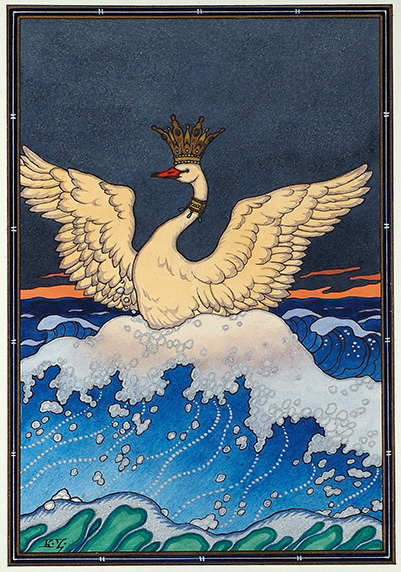
The Swan Princess rides upon the waves of Buyan. Illustration by Boris Zvorykin.

The magical swan also appears in Russian poem The Tale of Tsar Saltan (1831), by Alexander Pushkin. The son of the titular Tsar Saltan, Prince Gvidon, and his mother are cast in the sea in a barrel and wash ashore on a mystical island. There, the princeling grows up in days and becomes a fine hunter. Prince Gvidon and his mother begin to settle on the island thanks to the help of a magical swan called Princess Swan, and in the end of the tale she transforms into a princess and marries Prince Gvidon.

A variant of the swan maiden narrative is present in the work of Johann Karl August Musäus, a predecessor to the Brothers Grimm's endeavor in the early 1800s. The third volume of his Volksmärchen der Deutschen (1784) contains the story of Der geraubte Schleier ("The Stolen Veil"). Musäus's tale was translated into English as The Stealing of the Veil, or Tale À La Montgolfier (1791) and into French as Voile envolé, in Contes de Museäus (1826). In a summary: an old hermit, who lives near a lake of pristine water, rescues a young Swabian soldier; during a calm evening, the hermit reminisces about an episode of his adventurous youth when he met in Greece a swan-maiden, descended from Leda and Zeus themselves – in the setting of the story, the Greco-Roman deities were "genies" and "fairies". The hermit explains the secret of their magical garment and how to trap one of the ladies. History repeats itself as the young soldier sets his sights on a trio of swan maidens who descend from the heavens to bathe in the lake.

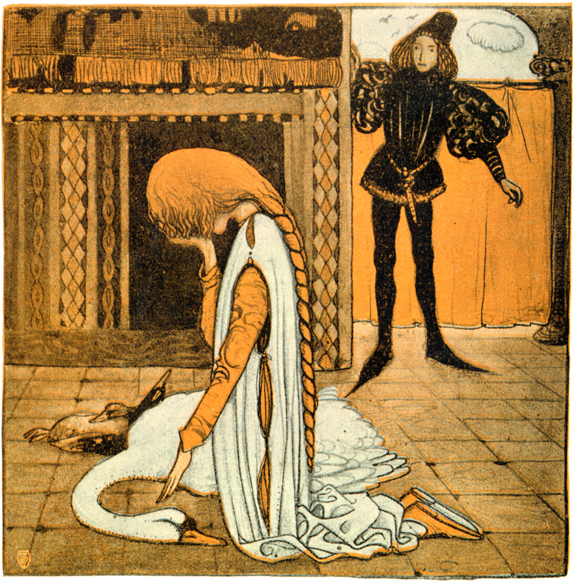
Swan princess crying. Art by John Bauer (1908) for Helena Nyblom's tale Svanhammen.

Swedish writer Helena Nyblom explored the theme of a swan maiden who loses her feathery cloak in Svanhamnen (The Swan Suit), published in 1908, in Bland tomtar och troll (Among Gnomes and Trolls), an annual anthology of literary fairy tales and stories.

In a literary work by Adrienne Roucolle, The Kingdom of the Good Fairies, in the chapter The Enchanted Swan, princess Lilian is turned into a swan by evil Fairy Hemlock.

Irish novelist and author Padraic Colum reworked a series of Irish legends in his book The King of Ireland's Son, among them the tale of the swan maiden as a wizard's daughter. In this book, the King of Ireland's oldest son loses a wager against his father's enemy and must find him within a year and a day. He is advised by a talking eagle to spy on three swans that will descend on a lake. They are the daughters of the Enchanter of the Black Back-Lands, the wizard the prince is looking for. The prince is instructed to hide the swanskin of the swan with a green ribbon, who is Fedelma, the Enchanter's youngest daughter.

== Folkloristics ==
One might call the "swan maiden" type tale an amalgam of motifs. Established American and Western folkloristics does not formally recognize "Swan Maidens" as such, to be a single Aarne-Thompson tale type. Thus one must speak of tales that exhibit Stith Thompson motif index "D361.1. Swan Maiden", or "B652. Marriage to bird in human form" and other related ones, which may be classed AT 400, 313, or 465A. Compounded by the fact that these tale types have "no fewer than ten other motifs" assigned to them, the AT system becomes a cumbersome tool for keeping track of parallels for this motif. Seeking an alternate scheme, one investigator has developed a system of five Swan Maiden paradigms, four of them groupable as a Grimm tale cognate (KHM 193, 92, 93, and 113) and the remainder classed as the "AT 400" paradigm. Bolte and Polívka's Anmerkungen to Grimm's Tale KHM 193 has a comprehensive list of the most starkly-resembling cognates of Swan Maiden tales.

=== Magic wife as etiological tale ===
Julien d'Huy's study narrows the focus on "magic wife" type indigenous tales to those of cosmological or etiological nature (esp. origins of man, or a race of people), on the assumption that these tales are less prone to contamination by Western storytelling.

According to D'Huy, myths are adapted to the elements of the local context of each culture, frequently undergoing subtle changes, while preserving most of the original structure or main prototypical elements. Thus, all the versions where the sky-maiden is a migratory bird are mostly found in northernmost regions. In contrast, more to the South, the women of the tale are more commonly non-migratory birds, and may also be stars or celestial nymphs. Also in the southernmost regions, differently from the northern ones, the sky-maiden stories generally have anthropogonic or ethiological value, explaining the origin of humans, cultures, gods, and celestial phenomena.

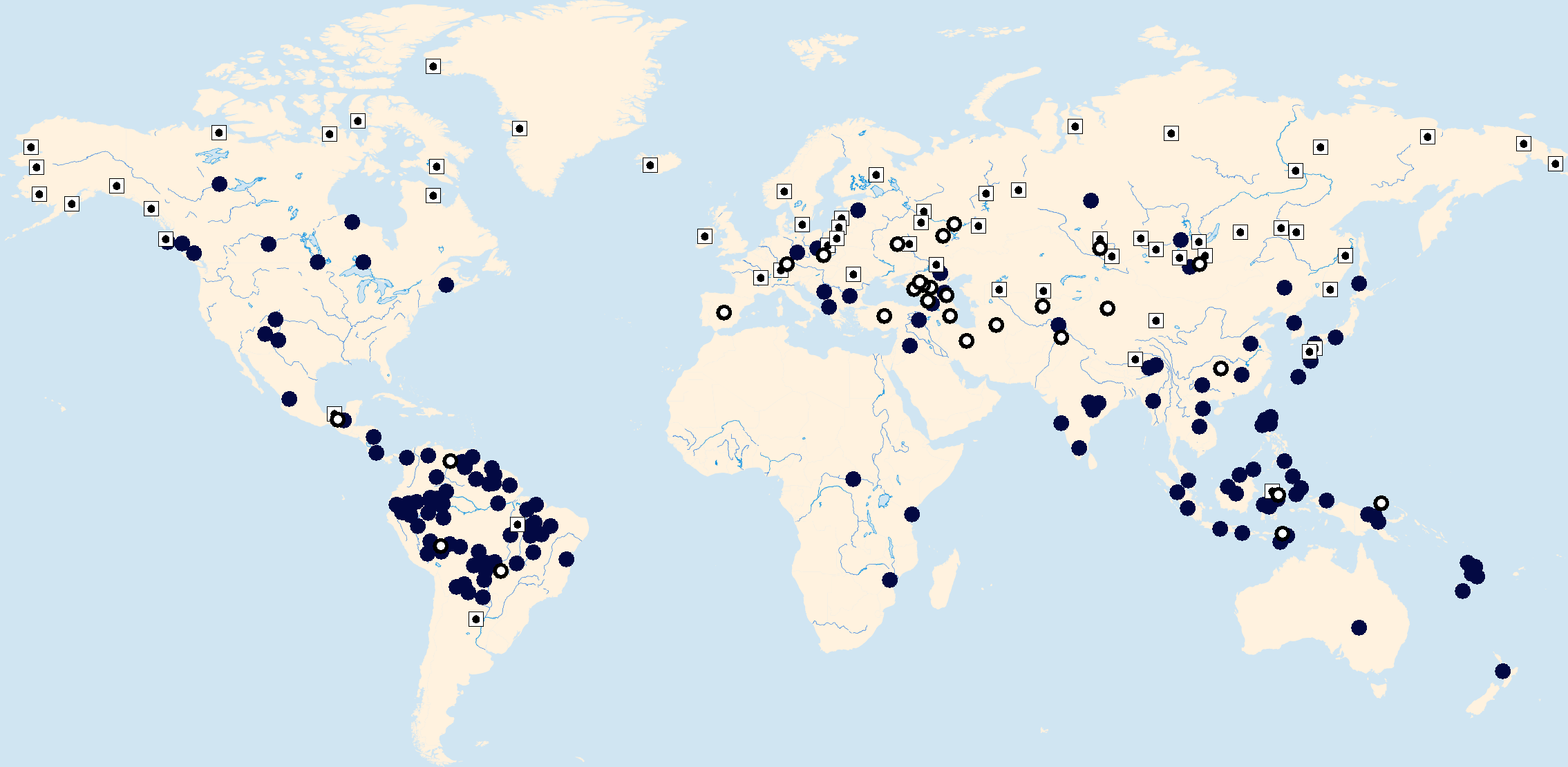
Distribution of the "magic wife" motif the white square with black dot indicates where the sky-maiden appears as migratory birds (swans, geese, ducks, cranes or herons); the black circle with white dot, where she appears as a dove; the dark blue full circle, where the sky-maiden is either a non-migratory bird, star or sky nymph.

The areal study of the Swan Maiden myth first began in 1894, with Hyacinthe de Charencey. The proposal of its origins in India by Theodor Benfey and the Finnish school has been discredited a long time ago.

Yuri Evgenievich Berezkin points out that, among the hundreds of other categories of motifs, the bird-maiden motif belongs to a core group (ATU 400):

"The different types, or set of types, therefore seem linked by a very small number of intermediate stories. These stories, therefore, seem more important than others in the economy of narration, probably acting for storytellers as a mental intermediary or a “highway interchange” between distinct groups of story-types. The cultural success and the area of diffusion of the tale-types do not seem to explain the centrality of the stories, but they all share the property of being probably extremely old, as if the flesh of our folklore had grown on a bone frame much older than that."

=== Swan maiden as ancestress ===
According to scholarship, "an ancient belief in bird-human transformation is manifest in Eurasian mythology". For instance, the mythical character of the swan maiden is found "in the whole of northern Eurasia, from Scandinavia to Manchuria". As such, "a great number of populations" in these regions claim her as their totemic ancestress, such as the peoples and tribes of Siberia and Central Asia. This narrative is attested in ethnogenetic myths of the Buryat, Evenks, Sakha, Kazakhs, Chukotko-Kamchatkan, Na-Dené, Bashkir, and Amerindian peoples. Further study suggests that this form of totemic mythology goes back to a pre-Indo-European Nostratic or even Boreal past.

Professor Hazel Wigglesworth, who worked with the many languages of the Philippines archipelago, stated that the character of the mortal male is sometimes named Itung or Beletamey, and he represents a cultural hero or ancestor of the Manobo people.

English folklorist Edwin Sidney Hartland mentioned a tale about a divine ancestress of the Bantik people (of the Celebes Island, modern Sulawesi) who comes down to Earth with her seven companions to bathe in a lake. A human male sees them coming to earth and steals the clothing of one of the maidens, thus forcing her to marry him.

19th-century missionary John Batchelor collected an etiological tale from the Ainu people, about the swan maiden. According to this story, the swan, created as an angel, is turned into a human woman. She descends to Earth to save an Ainu boy in Takai Sara of the Nikap district. Once he grows up, they marry and father numerous children. She reveals she is a swan, sent to him to "repopulate the Ainu race".

According to scholarship, "in Kazakh and Siberian variants" of the heroic tale of Edige, his mother is described as a Swan Maiden. Edige (Edigu) is known as the historical founder of the Nogai Horde.

A line of Russian and Mongolian scholarship suggests that the cult of the swan ancestress developed in the Altai Mountains region (or in Altai-Sayan region), which would explain the common features of the ethnogenetic myths of peoples inhabiting the area, e.g., Turkic and Mongolic peoples. For instance, Buryat professor T. B. Tsydendambaev (ru) supposed that the Mongol-speaking Khorin replaced their canine totem for a swan totem of Turkic origin during the 1st millennium AD.

According to Käthe Uray-Kőhalmi, a trio of celestial sisters, identified as daughters of Heaven itself or of a celestial deity, appear as helpers and wives of male heroes, who marry them and beget clans and dynasties. This motif appears in both the epos and mythologies of the Mongolic and Manchu-Tungus people, where they assume the guise of a water bird, like swans, cranes, and wild geese.

=== Swan maiden in shamanism ===
According to scholarship, "an ancient belief in bird-human transformation is manifest ... in shamanic practices". Edward A. Armstrong and Alan Miller noted that swans appear in Siberian shamanism, which, according to Miller, contains stories about male shamans being born of a human father and a divine wife in bird form. (Note: According to Joseph Campbell, "tales ... of the swan maiden [were] told wherever shamanism has flourished".)

In the same vein, scholar Manabu Waida transcribed a tale collected in Trans-Baikal Mongolia among the Buryat, wherein the human hunter marries one of three swan maidens, daughters of Esege Malan. In another account, the children born of this union become great shamans and shamanesses. A similar story occurs in the Ryukyu Islands, wherein the swan maiden, stranded on Earth, gives birth to a son that becomes a toki and two daughters that become a noro and a yuta.

Researcher Rosanna Budelli also argues for "shamanic reminiscences" in the Arabian Nights tale of Hasan of Basrah (and analogues such as Mazin of Khorassan and Jansah), for example, in the "ornitomorphic costume" of the bird-maidens that appear in the story.

=== Celtic and Nordic migratory legend ===
Patricia Monaghan stated the swan maiden was an "Irish, Scottish and a continental Celtic folkloric figure", appearing, for instance, in Armorica.

British folklorist Katharine Mary Briggs, while acknowledging the universality of the tale, suggested that the character was more prevalent in the Celtic fairy-tale tradition of the British Islands. She claimed in the introduction to fellow British folklore collector and writer Ruth Tongue's book that "variants [of the Swan Maiden tale] are common in Wales".

In the same vein, William Bernard McCarthy reported that in Irish tradition the tale type ATU 400 ("Swan Maiden") is frequently merged with ATU 313 ("The Master Maid", "The Magical Flight", "The Devil's Daughter", cf. § Helper). In that regard, Norwegian folklorist Reidar Thoralf Christiansen suggested that the presence of the Swan maiden character in tale type ATU 313 "could be explained by the circumstance that in both cycles a woman with supernatural powers plays a leading part".

In addition, Celticist Tom Peete Cross concluded that the swan maiden "figured in Celtic literature before the twelfth century"; however, in this tradition, she was often confused for similar supernatural women, i.e., the Celtic fairy-princess, the forth-putting fée and the water-fée.

Bo Almqvist considers that there was a time when it was ubiquitous to believe that "certain zoomorphic or semi-zoomorphic beings – whether expressly stated to be enchanted humans or not – can remove their animal coats and take human shape". In an analysis by Almqvist of the 1919 thesis of Helge Holmström on the Swan Maiden motif, he says that: "the Swan Maiden Legend is but one of a whole complex of migratory legends relating to marriages to supernatural or supernaturally transformed female beings", and that one other such group includes that of aquatic beings, such as mermaids; there are similarities between sky-maiden and sea-maiden stories.

== Antiquity and origin ==
A. T. Hatto connects the origin of the bird-maiden motif with the migration and mating of migratory aquatic-related bird (swans included), and local totemic and shamanistic conceptions, such as the possible notions of foreign women (with the analogy of the migratory birds) being related to sorcery; the husband undertaking labours and challenges in his search journey; or an analogy for the soul flight.

Berezkin affirms that this motif might have appeared first in Asia, diffusing to the New World, and that a novel ecotype later arrived at North Eurasia and again was brought to North America, c. 5000 BC. Julien d’Huy identified the presence of the bird-maiden story also in six linguistically isolated groups: the Ainus, the Basques, the Burusho, the Koreans, the Cofán, the Haida, the Tlingit and the Natchez. Based on the cladistics of the mythemes, he obtained statistical evidence supporting Berezkin's proposal that the motif arrived in the Americas at two different times. He thus reconstructed the protomyth (with more than 75% chance) as appearing first in East Asia following this structure:

"The hero, a young man, a good hunter, surprises women bathing in a lake. They have retained their appearance as immortals or supernatural creatures. They undress and their bodies or clothes are covered with feathers. The hero seizes the clothes or the plumage of the most beautiful woman, but does not hide them. The naked woman asks the hero to give her back her outfit. She promises [in exchange] to marry him. They first live in the hero's world. One day, the woman puts on her old plumage and, after living on earth, returns to heaven. The man tries to find her. He performs several difficult and dangerous tasks, and his quest ends happily, with a reunion with his wife. However, at the end of the story, the hero lives alone or returns home alone."

The researcher also points out that, among the hundreds of other categories of motifs, the bird-maiden motif belongs to a core group (ATU 400):

=== Ancient Indian literature ===
It has been suggested that the romance of apsara Urvasi and king Pururavas, of ancient Sanskrit literature, may be one of the oldest forms (or origin) of the Swan-Maiden tale.

The antiquity of the swan-maiden tale was suggested in the 19th century by Reverend Sabine Baring-Gould, postulating an origin of the motif before the separation of the Proto-Indo-European language, and, due to the presence of the tale in diverse and distant traditions (such as Samoyedic and Native Americans), there was a possibility that the tale may be even older. Another theory was supported by Charles Henry Tawney, in his translation of Somadeva's Kathasaritsagara: he suggests the source of the motif to be old Sanskrit literature; the tale then migrated to Middle East, and from there as an intermediate point, spread to Europe.

=== Geography and migratory patterns ===
A line of scholarship suggests that the dispersal of the swan maiden tale is related to the migratory patterns of swans and similar birds. Jörg Bäcker contrasts between northern and southern areas where tales appear: swans and cranes in Hungary, Siberia, China, Korea, and Japan; wild geese among the Paleoasian and Eskimo (Inuit) peoples and across Northwestern North America; Peris in the form of doves in Iran.

Arthur T. Hatto recognized a mythic dimension in the character and the narrative, but argued for a location in subarctic Eurasia and America, in relation to the migration of swans, cranes, geese, and similar waterfowl. Similarly, Edward Allworthy Armstrong recognized the "ancient lineage" of the tale, and supposed an origin in a "northerly climate", north of the Eurasian mountain ranges, where swans are common.

Lotte Motz, in turn, remarked that the story of the swan maiden was "current in the primitive setting of north-Eurasian peoples, where water birds are of importance". That is, she argues, in areas of "archaic economic systems", the swan maiden appears in the folklore of peoples, "in which water birds contribute to the economic well-being of the community", which could be affected by the migratory patterns of these birds.

Analysing Yakut tales about a bird maiden, ethnographer S. Ivanovich Nikolaev, in a 1982 article, argued that the motif of the bird maidens taking off their birdskins resembled the act of moulting. According to him, birds losing their wings while also moulting would seem to happen in the Far North, which would indicate the origin of the tale in a Northern location.

E. A. Armstrong also reported that "several" variants of the Southern European tradition have the dove-maiden in place of the swan. In this regard, scholarship notes that the common pigeon (rock dove)'s original geographic range seemed restricted to Asia Minor, India, North Africa, and the Southern European countries, like Greece and Italy, while the domesticated dove originated "from North Africa and Near East".

=== Phylogenetic studies ===
Each of them using different methods, i.e. observation of the distribution area of the Swan Maiden type or use of phylogenetic or cladistic methods to reconstruct the evolution of the tale, Gudmund Hatt, Yuri Berezkin and Julien d'Huy independently showed that this folktale would have appeared during the Paleolithic period, in the Pacific Asia, before spreading in two successive waves in America. In addition, Berezkin and d'Huy showed that there was no mention of migratory birds in the early versions of this tale (this motif seems to appear very late).

According to d'Huy, such a motif would also have existed in European prehistory, with a buffalo maiden as the heroine. Indeed, this author finds the motif with four-legged animals in North America and Europe, in an area coinciding with the area of haplogroup X.

=== Role of the Swan Maiden ===
The swan maiden has been noted to belong to a different race than that of the human husband. According to Alan Miller and Amira El-Zein, the swan maiden is connected both to air (or "sky world") and to water. In this regard, in many tales, the swan maiden and her sisters are daughters of a celestial deity, a king of spirits or come from the skies.

The swan maidens embody desirable traits like luck and prosperity. In this regard, according to researcher Serinity Young, she also represents an image of the feminine divine that the male character tries to capture, since she brings prosperity and can lift the latter to "higher states of being, including immortality".

== Animal wife motif ==
=== Distribution and variants ===
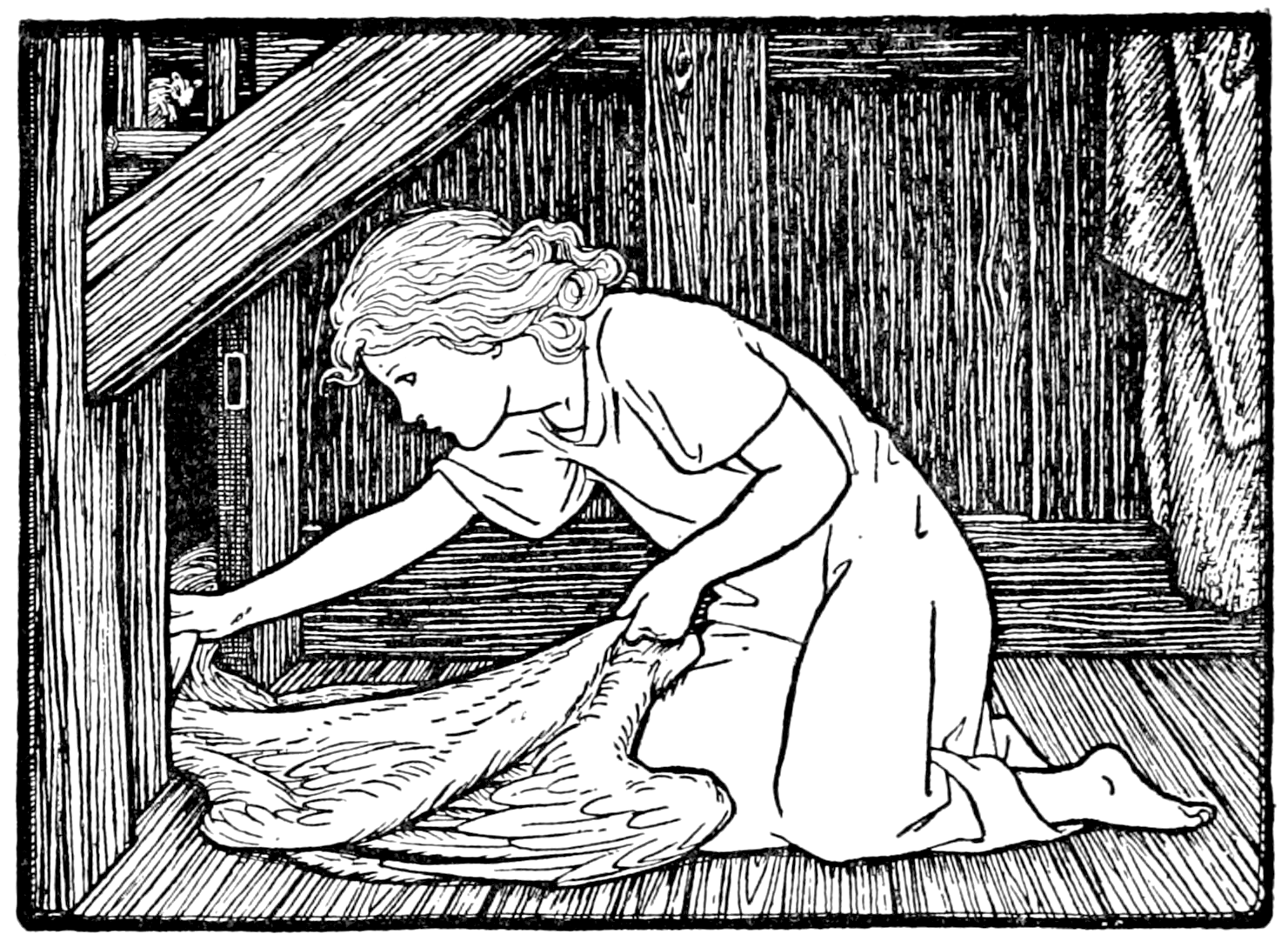
The swan maiden's child finds her mother's hidden featherskin. Illustration from Jacobs's Europa's Fairy Book by John D. Batten

The motif of the wife of supernatural origin (in most cases, a swan maiden) has universal appeal, appearing in the oral and folkloric traditions of every continent. The swan is the typical species, but they can transform into "geese, ducks, spoonbills, or aquatic birds of some other species". Other animals include "peahens, hornbills, wild chickens, parakeets and cassowaries".

ATU 402 ("The Animal Bride") group of folktales is found across the world, though the animals vary. The Italian fairy tale "The Dove Girl" features a dove. There are the Orcadian and Shetland selkies, that alternate between seal and human shape. A Croatian tale features a she-wolf. The wolf also appears in the folklore of Estonia and Finland as the "animal bride", under the tale type ATU 409, "The Girl as Wolf".

In Africa, the same motif is shown through buffalo maidens. (Note: The swan maiden has also been compared to the "Donkey-Girl" or "Donkey-Maiden" of Hausa folklore, in Africa.) In addition, according to American folklorist William Bascom, in similar narratives among the Yoruba and the Fon the animal wife is an African buffalo, a gazelle, a hind, sometimes a duiker or antelope.

In East Asia, it is also known for featuring maidens who transform into various bird species.

Russian professor Valdemar Bogoras collected a tale from a Yukaghir woman in Kolyma, in which three Tungus sisters change into "female geese" to pick berries. On one occasion, the character of "One-Side" hides the skin of the youngest, who cannot return to goose form. She eventually consents to marry "One-Side".

In a tale attributed to the Toraja people of Indonesia, a woman gives birth to seven crabs, which she throws into the water. As time passes, the seven crabs find a place to live and take on their disguises to assume human form. On one occasion, seven males steal the crab disguises of the seven crab maidens and marry them. A second one is close to the Swan maiden narrative, only with parakeets instead of swans; the hero is called Magoenggoelota and the maiden Kapapitoe.

==== Europe ====
In a 13th-century romance about Friedrich von Schwaben (English: "Friedrich of Suabia"), The knight Friedrich hides Princess Angelburge's clothing, who came to bathe in a lake in dove form.

===== Western Europe =====
In a tale from Brittany, collected by François-Marie Luzel with the title Pipi Menou et Les Femmes Volantes ("Pipi Menou and the Flying Women"), Pipi Menou, a shepherd boy, sees three large white birds descending near a étang (a pond). When the birds approach the pond, they transform into nude maidens and begin to play in the water. Pipi Menou sees the whole scene from the hilltop and tells his mother, who explains they are the daughters of a powerful magician who lives elsewhere, in a castle filled with jewels and precious stones. The next day, he steals one of their clothes, but she convinces him to give it back. He goes to the castle, the flying maiden recognizes him, and they both escape with jewels in their pouches.

===== Southern Europe =====
Portuguese writer Theophilo Braga collected a Portuguese tale named O Príncipe que foi correr a sua Ventura ("The Prince Who Wanted to See the World"), in which a prince loses his bet against a stranger, a king in disguise, and must become the stranger's servant. A beggar woman with a child informs the prince that there is a tank in a garden where three doves come to bathe. He should take the feathery robe of the last one and withhold it until the maiden gives him three objects.

A tale from Tirol tells of Prince Eligio and the Dove-Maidens, who bathe in a lake.

In another tale, from Tirol, collected by Christian Schneller (German: Die drei Tauben; Italian: Le tre colombe; English: "The Three Doves"), a youth loses his soul in a gamble to a wizard. A saint helps him and gives him information about three doves that perch on a bridge and change into human form. The youth steals the clothing of the wizard's youngest daughter and promises to take him to her father. She wants to help the hero convert to Christianity and abandon her pagan magic.

====== Spain ======
In a Basque tale collected by Wentworth Webster (The Lady Pigeon and her Comb), the destitute hero is instructed by a "Tartaro" to collect the pigeon garment of the middle maiden, instead of the youngest.

In the Andalusian variant, El Marqués del Sol ("The Marquis of the Sun"), a player loses his bet against the Marqués and must wear out seven pairs of iron shoes. In his wanderings, he pays the debt of a dead man and his soul, in gratitude, informs him that three white doves, the daughters of the Marqués in avian form, will come to bathe in a lake.

In a variant collected by folklorist Aurelio Macedonio Espinosa Sr. in Granada, a gambling prince loses a bet against a dove (the Devil, in disguise), who says he should find him in "Castillo de Siete Rayos de Sol" ("The Castle of Seven Sunrays"). A helping hermit guides him to a place where the three devil's daughters, in the form of doves, come to bathe. The prince should steal the garments of the youngest, named Siete Rayos de Sol, who betrays her father and helps the human prince.

In an Asturian tale collected by Aurelio del Llano, the youngest of three brothers works with a giant, who forbids him to open a certain door. He does and sees three dove maidens alighting near the water, becoming women and bathing. The youth tells the giant about this event, and his employer suggests he steal the feather of the one he set his sights on. He takes the feather of one of the dove maidens, marries her, and gives her feather to his mother to keep. Hispanist Ralph Steele Boggs classified it as type 400*B (a number not included in the revision of the international index at the time).

===== Northern Europe =====
In the Danish tale The White Dove, the youngest prince, unborn at the time, is "sold" by his elder brothers in exchange for a witch's help in dissipating a sea storm. Years later, the witch upholds her end of the bargain and takes the prince under her tutelage. As part of his everyday chores, the witch sets him with difficult tasks, which he accomplishes with the help of a princess, who the witch enchanted to become a dove.

===== Central Europe =====
A compilation of Central European (Austrian and Bohemian) folktales lists four variants of the Swan Maiden narrative: "The Three White Doves"; "The Maiden on the Crystal Mountain"; "How Hans finds his Wife", and "The Drummer". Theodor Vernaleken, in the German version of the compilation, narrated in his notes two other variants, one from St. Pölten and the other from Moldautein (modern day Týn nad Vltavou, in the Czech Republic).

===== Eastern Europe =====
In the Slavic fairy tale King Kojata or Prince Unexpected, the twelve royal daughters of King Kostei take off their goose disguises to bathe in the lake, but the prince hides the clothing of the youngest.

In the Czech tale The Three Doves, the hero hides the three golden feathers of the dove maiden to keep her in her human state. Later on, when she disappears, he embarks on an epic quest to find her.

In a Serbian tale collected by Vuk Karadzic and translated as Die Prinz und die drei Schwäne ("The Prince and the Three Swans"), a prince loses his way during a hunt and meets an old man who lives in a hut. He works for the older man and has to watch over a lake. On the second day of his job, three swans alight near the lake, take off their birdskins to become human maidens, and bathe. The next day, the prince steals their swan skins and hurries back to the older man's hut. The three swans beg for their birdskins back; the older man returns only two of them and withholds the youngest's skin. He marries the prince to the swan girl, and they return to his father's kingdom. One day, the swan wife asks her mother-in-law for her garments back; she puts them on and flies away to the Glass Mountain. The prince returns to the older man, the king of the winds, and is directed to the Glass Mountain. He climbs it and meets an older woman in a hut. Inside the hut, he must identify his wife from a group of 300 similarly dressed swan women. Later, he is forced to do chores for the older woman, which he does with his wife's help.

====== Russia ======
In the Russian fairy tale The Sea Tsar and Vasilisa the Wise, or Vassilissa the Cunning, and The Tsar of the Sea, Ivan, the merchant's son, was informed by an old hag (possibly Baba Yaga, in some versions) about the daughters of the Sea Tsar who come to bathe in a lake in the form of doves. In another translation, The King of the Sea and Melania, the Clever, and The Water King and Vasilissa the Wise, there are twelve maidens in the form of spoonbills. In another transcription of the same tale, the maidens are pigeons.

In another Russian variant, "Мужик и Настасья Адовна" ("The Man and Nastasya Adovna"), collected by Ivan Khudyakov, a creature jumps out of a well and tells a man to give him the thing he does not know he has at home (his newly born son). Years later, his son learns about his father's dealings and decides to travel to "Hell" ("Аду" or "Adu", in Russian). He visits three old women who give him directions to reach "Hell". The third old woman also informs him that in a lake, thirty-three maidens, the daughters of "Adu", come to bathe, and he should steal the clothing of Nastasya Adovna.

In a tale from Perm Krai with the title "Иванушка и его невеста" ("Ivanushka and his Wife"), Ivanushka loses his way from his grandfather in the forest, but eventually finds a hut. He takes shelter with an older man for the night, and the next day, the older man gives directions, but Ivanushka disregards them and finds a lake where maidens are bathing. The maidens leave the water, turn into ducks, and depart. Ivanushka goes back to the older man, and he advises him to steal the duck maiden's garments. Ivanushka does that and takes the girl for wife. She eventually retrieves her duck garments, bids Ivanushka to find her in a land beyond 30 realms, then flies away.

====== Ukraine ======
In a "Cossack" (Ukrainian) tale, The Story of Ivan and the Daughter of the Sun, the peasant Ivan obtains a wife in the form of a dove maiden whose robe he stole when she was bathing. Some time later, a nobleman lusts after Ivan's dove maiden wife and plans to get rid of the peasant.

In another Ukrainian variant that begins as tale type ATU 402, "The Animal Bride", akin to Russian The Frog Princess, the human prince marries the frog maiden Maria, and both are invited to the tsar's grand ball. Maria takes off her frog skin and enters the ballroom as a human, while her husband hurries home and burns it. When she comes home, she reveals that the prince's curse will soon be lifted, says he needs to find Baba Yaga in a remote kingdom, and then vanishes in the form of a cuckoo. He meets Baba Yaga, and she points to a lake where 30 swans will alight, his wife among them. He hides Maria's feather garment, they meet again, and Maria tells him to follow her into the undersea kingdom to meet her father, the Sea Tsar. The tale ends like tale type ATU 313, with the three tasks.

====== Hungary ======
A Hungarian tale ("Fisher Joe") tells of an orphan who catches a magical fish that reveals itself to be a lovely maiden. A second Magyar tale, "Fairy Elizabeth", is close to the general swan maiden story, only dealing with pigeon-maidens instead. In a third tale, Az örökbefogadott testvérek ("The adoptive brothers"), the main protagonist, Miklós, dreams that the Queen of the Fairies and her handmaidens come to his side in the form of swans and transform into beautiful women.

In the Hungarian tale Ráró Rózsa, the king promises his only son to a devil-like character who rescues him from danger. Eighteen years pass, and it is time for the prince to fulfill his father's promise. The youth bides his time in a stream and awaits the arrival of three black cranes, the devil's three daughters in disguise, to fetch the garments of the youngest.

In another tale, Tündér Ilona és Argyilus ("Fairy Ilona and Argyilus"), Prince Argyilus (hu) is tasked by his father, the king, with discovering what has been stealing the precious apples from his prized apple tree. One night, the prince sees thirteen black ravens flying to the tree. As soon as he captures the thirteenth one, it transforms into the beautiful golden-haired Fairy Ilona. A variant of the event also happens in Tündér Ilona és a királyfi ("Fairy Ilona and the Prince").

In the tale A zöldszakállú király ("The Green-Bearded King"), the king is forced to surrender his son to the devil king after it spares the man's life. Years later, the prince comes across a lake where seven wild ducks with golden plumage left their skins on the shores to bathe in the form of maidens.

In the tale A tizenhárom hattyú ("The Thirteen Swans"), collected by Hungarian journalist Elek Benedek, after his sister was kidnapped, Miklós finds work as a cowherd. On one occasion, when he leads the cows to graze, he sees thirteen swans flying about an apple tree. The swans, then, change their shapes into twelve beautiful maidens and the Queen of the Fairies.

===== Albania =====
In an Albanian-Romani tale, O Zylkanôni thai e Lačí Devlék'i ("The Satellite and the Maiden of Heaven"), an unmarried youth goes on a journey to find work. Some time later, he enters a dark world. There, he meets by the spring three partridges that take off their animal skins to bathe. The youth hides the garment of one of them, who begs him to give it back. She wears it again and asks him to find her where the sun rises in that dark world.

===== Caucasus Region =====
In an Azerbaijani variant, a prince travels to an island where birds with copper, silver, and gold wings bathe and marries the golden-winged maiden.

In an Armenian variant collected from an Armenian-American source (The Country of the Beautiful Gardens), a prince, after his father's death, decided to stay silent. A neighbouring king, who wants to marry him to his daughter, places him in his garden. There, he sees three colorful birds bathing in a pool, and they reveal themselves as beautiful maidens.

===== Latvia =====
According to the Latvian Folktale Catalogue, tale type ATU 400 is titled Vīrs meklē zudušo sievu ("Man on a Quest for the Lost Wife"). In the Latvian tale type, the protagonist finds the bird maidens (swans, ducks, doves) alighting near a lake to bathe, and steals the youngest's wings.

In a Latvian folktale, a female named Laima (possibly the Latvian goddess of fate) loses her feathered wings by burning. She no longer becomes a swan and marries a human prince. They live together in the human world and even have a child, but she wants to become a swan again. So her husband throws feathers at her, she regains her bird form and takes to the skies, visiting her mortal family from time to time.

===== Lithuania =====
In another Lithuanian variant published by Fr. Richter in the journal Zeitschrift für Volkskunde with the title Die Schwanfrau ("The Swan Woman"), a count's son, on a hunt, sights three swans, who talk among themselves that whoever is listening to them may help them break their curse. The count's son comes out of a bush and agrees to help them by fighting a giant and breaking the spell a magician cast on them.

==== Northern Eurasia ====
In a tale from the Samoyed people of Northern Eurasia, an older woman tells a youth about seven maidens bathing in a lake in a dark forest. English folklorist Edwin Sidney Hartland cited a variant where the seven maidens arrive at the lake in their reindeer chariot. Whatever their origin, scientist Fridtjof Nansen reported that, in these tales, the girls lived "in the air or in the sky".

Philosopher John Fiske cited a Siberian tale wherein a Samoyed man steals the feather skin of one of seven swan maidens. In return, he wants her help in enacting his revenge on seven robbers who killed his mother. In another version of this tale, still sourced from the Samoyed and translated by Charles Fillingham Coxwell, the seven men have kidnapped the sister of a Samoyed man, and the protagonist steals the garments of a woman from the sky to ensure her help.

In a tale attributed to the Tungus of Siberia, titled Ivan the Mare's Son (Russian: "Иван Кобыльников сын") - related to both Fehérlófia and Jean de l'Ours -, a mare gives birth to a human son, Ivan. When he grows up, he meets two companions also named Ivan: Ivan the Sun's Son and Ivan the Moon's Son. The three decide to live together in a hut made of wooden poles and animal skins. For two nights, after they hunt in the forest, they come home and see the place in perfect order. On the third night, Ivan, the Mare's Son, decides to stay awake and discovers that three herons descending to the ground and taking off their feathers and wings to become maidens. Ivan, the Mare's Son, hides their bird garments until they reveal themselves. Marfida, the heron maiden, and her sisters marry the three Ivans, and the three couples live together. The rest of the story follows the tale type ATU 301, "The Three Stolen Princesses": the hero's descent into the underworld, the rescue of the maidens, betrayal by companions, and return to the upper world on an eagle.

In a Mongolian tale, Manihuar (Манихуар), a prince on a hunt sees three swans take off their golden crowns and become women. As they bathe in a nearby lake, he takes the golden crown of one of them, so she can't turn back into her bird form. He marries this swan maiden, named Manihuar. When the prince is away, his other wives threaten her, and Manihuar, fearing for her life, convinces her mother-in-law to return her golden crown. She turns back into a swan and flies back to her celestial realm. Her husband goes on a quest to bring her back.

Scholar Kira van Deusen collected a tale from an old Ul'chi storyteller named Anna Alexeevna Kavda (Grandma Nyura). In her tale, titled The Swan Girls, two orphan brothers live together. The older, Natalka, hunts game for them, while the youngest stays at home. One day, seven swans (kilaa in the Ulch language) land near their house and turn into seven human women. They enter the brothers' house, do the chores, sew clothes for the younger sibling, and leave. He tells Natalka the story, and they decide to capture two of the maidens as spouses for them.

===== Yakut people =====
In an olonkho (epic narrative of the Yakut or Sakha people) titled Yuchyugey Yudyugyuyen, Kusagan Hodzhugur, obtained from Olonhohut ('storyteller', 'narrator') Darya Tomskaya-Chayka, from Verkhoyansk, Yuchugey Yudyugyuyen, the elder of two brothers, goes hunting in the taiga. Suddenly, he sees 7 Siberian cranes coming to play with his young brother, Kusagan Hodzhugur, distracting him from his chores. The maidens possibly belong to the Aiy people, good spirits of the Upper World in Yakut mythology. When they come a third time, the elder brother, Yuchugey, disguises himself as a woodchip or a flea and hides the bird skin of one of the crane maidens. They marry. One day, she fools her brother-in-law, regains her magical crane garment, and returns to the Upper World. Hero Yuchugey embarks on a quest to find her, receiving help from a wise older man. Eventually, he reaches the Upper world and finds his wife and a son in a yurt. Yuchugey burns his wife's feathers; she dies, but is revived, and they return to the world of humans. This narrative sequence was recognized as very similar to a folk tale.

Russian ethnographer Ivan Khudyakov collected a Yakut tale titled "Хороший Юджиян", published in 1890. Its plot is very similar to the olonkho: two brothers live together, with one hunting and the other staying home. The one who stays home is visited by seven Siberian cranes who change shape into maidens, clean their house, and depart as cranes. The first brother captures and marries one of them by hiding her crane skin, and they have a child. One day, the second brother returns the plumage to his sister-in-law; the maiden becomes a crane again and flies away. The first brother jumps on his horse and follows his wife to her celestial realm. Once there, he is advised to creep into her hut and play with his child on their cradle to draw the mother's attention. The crane maiden enters the hut to rock her baby, and her husband appears.

Variants of the Yakut tale "Үчүгэй Үɵдүйээн" (Russian: "Хороший Юджиян") were collected in the northern part of the Republic of Sakha and show great resemblance among them. According to Russian scholarship, Yakut professor Dmitry Kononovich (D. K.) Sivtsev-Suorun Omolloon based himself on the international classification put forth by Antti Aarne in 1910 and later expanded by other folklorists, and classified these Yakut narratives as type 400C, "Муж возвращает убежавшую жену" ("Man goes after his runaway wife"): the bird maiden (a stork or Siberian crane maiden) wears its featherskin and escapes; man goes after her in the sky; she dies, but he resurrects her.

==== West Asia ====
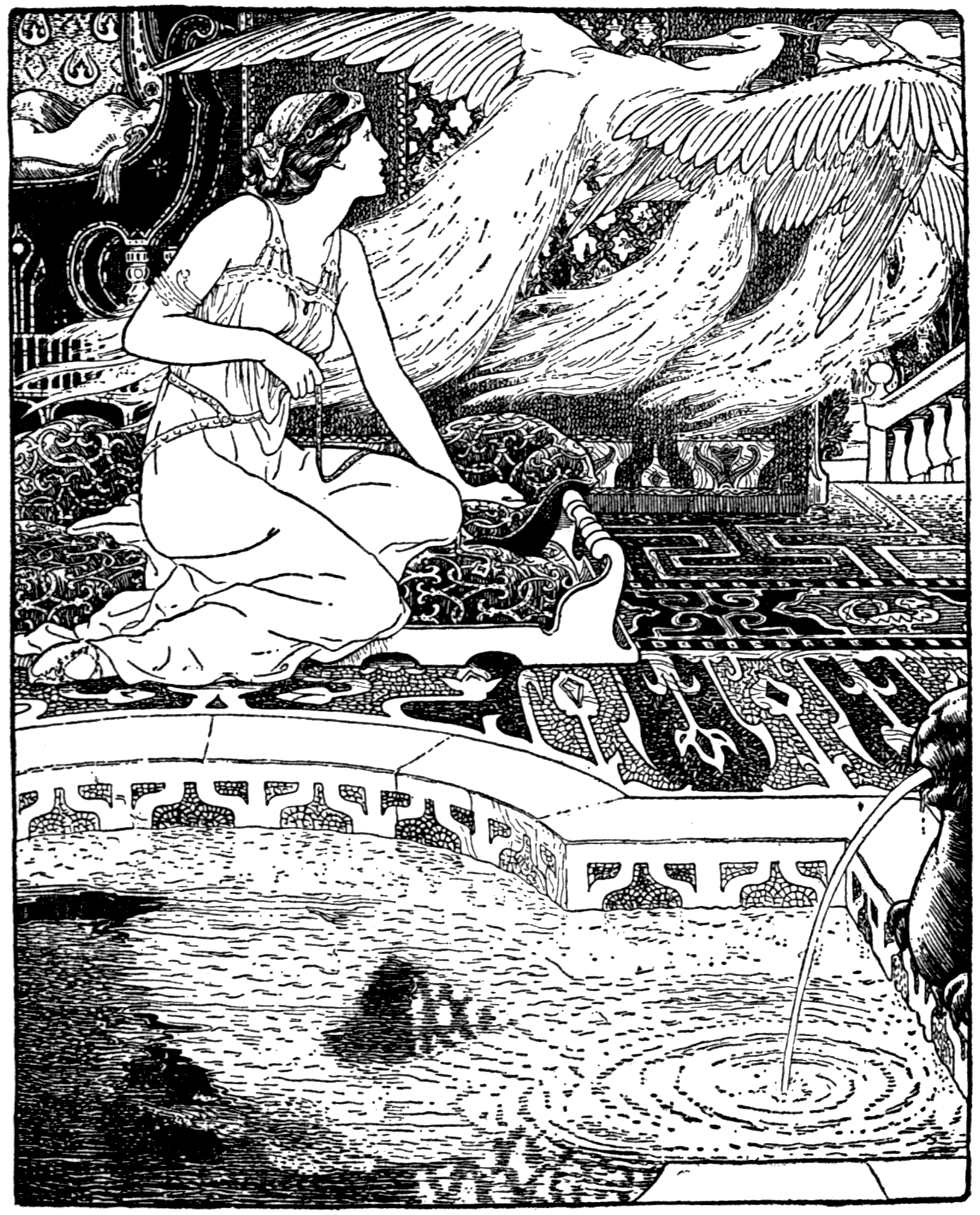
The swans take flight from the ornate pavilion, leaving their sister behind. Illustration from Hassan of Bassorah by John Batten.

The tale of the swan maiden also appears in the Arab collection of folktales The Arabian Nights, in "The Story of Janshah", a tale inserted in the narrative of The Queen of the Serpents. In a second tale, the story of Hasan of Basrah (Hassan of Bassorah), the titular character arrives at an oasis and sees the bird maidens (birds of paradise) undressing their plumage to play in the water. Both tales are considered to contain the international tale of the Swan Maiden.

In another Middle Eastern tale, a king's son finds work with a giant in another region and receives a set of keys to the giant's abode, being told not to open a specific door. He disobeys his master and opens the door; he soon sees three pigeon maidens take off their garments to bathe in a basin.

In a Metawileh tale reported in the Palestine Exploration Quarterly, Shâtir Hassan, son of a merchant, pursues a bird-girl named Bedr et Temâm (translating as 'full moon'), daughter of the King of the Jân. The report described the tale as a version of the "Swan maiden" tale.

==== South Asia ====
A story from South Asia also narrates the motif of the swan maiden or bird-princess: Story of Prince Bairâm and the Fairy Bride, in which the titular prince hides Ghûlab Bânu's clothing, the dove-maiden.

==== Central Asia ====
In a Tuvan tale, Ösküs-ool and the Daughter of Kurbustu-Khan, poor orphan boy Ösküs-ool seeks employment with powerful khans. He is tasked with harvesting their fields before the sun sets or before the moon sets. Nearly finishing both chores, the boy pleads to the moon and the sun not set for a little longer, but time passes. The respective khans think they never finished the job, berate and whip him. Some time later, while living on his own, the daughter of Khurbustu-khan comes from the upper world in the form of a swan. The boy hides her clothing, and she marries him, now that she is stranded on Earth. Some time later, an evil Karaty-khan demands that the youth produces a palace of glass and an invincible army of iron men for him - feats that he accomplishes thanks to his wife's advice and with help from his wife's relatives.

==== Africa ====
According to scholar Denise Paulme, in African tales, the animal spouse (a buffalo or an antelope) marries a human male already married to a previous human wife. The man hides the skin of the supernatural spouse, and she asks him never to reveal her true name. When the husband betrays the supernatural wife's trust, the animal wife takes her skin back and returns to the wilderness with her children.

Variants collected in Cape Verde by Elsie Clews Parsons (under the title White-Flower) show the hero plucking the feather from the duck maiden to travel to her father's house.

In a Kabylian tale collected by ethnologist Leo Frobenius, titled Die Taubenfrauen ("The Dove Maidens"), a young hunter journeys and meets two women who invite him to live with them as their brother. One day, two doves land near their house and become maidens. They turn the man to stone, turn back into doves, and fly away. The next time they land, the hunter's adopted sisters hide the dove garments and golden jewellery of one of the dove maidens, in return for changing their brother back. The dove maiden does. The sisters give the garments to the hunter. The dove-maiden marries the hunter and bears him a son. Some time later, he wants to visit his mother in his home village. He takes his dove-wife and son. The hunter gives his mother the dove-wife's belongings and explains that she must never let her leave the house and must hide the garments and jewellery. One day, the dove maiden goes out for a bit, and a harvester becomes entranced by her beauty. The man tells the dove-wife she must marry him. The dove-wife begs her mother-in-law to give her belongings so she may escape. After getting the garments, she turns into a dove, takes her son, and flies over to the village of Wuak-Wuak. The hunter returns home and goes after her. He fools three people fighting over magical objects, steals them, and teleports to Wuak-Wuak. There, he finds his wife and son, but his dove-wife explains the whole village only has females, and if they see him, her sisters will devour him.

==== Oceania and Pacific Ocean ====
The character of the swan maiden (and her variants) is spread among the many traditions of Oceania and the Pacific Ocean, such as in Micronesia. In this region, the bird maiden may be replaced for a sea creature, such as a fish, a porpoise, a dolphin (in Yap and Kei Islands), or a whale (in Puluwat and Satawal).

At least 33 variants have been collected from Papua New Guinea, published in the local newspaper Wantok Niuspepa in a section on traditional tales. Sometimes the swan garment is replaced by a cassowary skin or a bird-of-paradise. For instance, the tale of The Cassowary Wife was stated by anthropologist Margaret Mead to be the local version of the Swan maiden.

American anthropologist Donald Tuzin collected and published a tale from the Ilahita Arapesh: long ago, there was only one man. One day, he walks about and hears sounds coming from a nearby pond. He sees a group of cassowaries come to the water, taking off their animal skins and becoming human women. The man hides the leader of the cassowaries' clothing, named Nambweapa'w, in a short bamboo tube. The cassowary women play and bathe in the pond until afternoon, when they leave, gather their animal skins, and turn back into cassowaries, except for their leader. The man takes Nambweapa'w to his house and marries her. They have many children, both male and female. Their youngest child, a boy, cries a lot, so his father takes out the cassowary skin to frighten the boy into silence. The next day, the little boy shows his mother the cassowary skin, she puts it back, and runs back to the forest, abandoning her human family. The tale continues with the adventures of the cassowary woman's sons, as an origin myth of the Arapesh.

Professor Sir James George Frazer mentioned a tale from the Pelew Islands (Palau) in the Pacific about a man who married a shapeshifting maiden by hiding her fish tail. They had a daughter, and on one occasion, they found her fish tail and returned to the ocean soon after.

In a tale from Kairiru Island with the title Stori Bilong Taim Bipo: The Dolphin Woman, a group of women are cutting bushes to make a garden. Suddenly, heavy rain begins to fall, and the women return to their village. Once they are gone, a school of dolphins appears, takes off their dolphin "bodies" and become human women to finish the work on the garden, then return to the sea as dolphins. Some time later, a man goes to the garden to wait for the rain, and sees the dolphins come out of the water and become women. He hides the dolphin skin of one of them; after the others are gone, the man takes the dolphin woman home and marries her. She bears him two children. One day, she is ready to return to the sea and tries to get her sons to go with her by turning them into dolphins with saltwater. In another version, the man is named Mutabau. This second tale was reported by Michael French Smith, told by a man named Valentine Wamuk, a descendant of Mutabau.

In a tale from Losap, Chuuk, with the title The Island of the Dolphin Girls, a chief's son named Anoun Farrang from the Lugenfanu clan is sailing on a canoe with other men, when their canoe is approached by a pod of dolphins (who are really girls in delphine skin). One of the dolphins hits Anoun with her tail, and he falls overboard, forgotten by his fellow men. With his magic powers, he can dive underwater until he reaches a small island with a pool in its middle. Anoun hides behind a bush and sees a pod of dolphins coming to shore, jumping into the pool, taking off their skins, and becoming girls. While they play and splash water, Anoun takes the dolphin skin from one of them. The girls take back the skins, change into dolphins, and return to the sea, leaving only one girl on the island. Anoun comes to her and gives back her dolphin skin. The girl's pod returns and catches Anoun's human scent, and, convinced by their friend, agrees to let the boy live with them. Some time later, Anoun begins to miss his human home, and the pod swims with him back to the surface.

==== Americas ====
===== Indigenous peoples =====
In a tale of the Musquakie people, some male youths bathe and play in the water while some beautiful girls approach them. One of the male youths gets one of the girls, and the others, frightened, turn into black-headed ducks and fly away.

Some tales from the Algonquins also tell of a young, unmarried hunter who approaches a lake where otherworldly women come to bathe to acquire a supernatural spouse.

In a tale of the Cochiti people, a coyote (possibly the Coyote of legend) helps a youth in getting a wife: one of three pigeon girls who bathe in a lake. In a variant, the coyote leads the youth to three dove maidens.

In a tale from the Tewa, collected by Elsie Clews Parsons, the youth Powitsire hunts a deer, which suggests the boy find a wife and reveals that three duck girls come to bathe in a nearby lake. In a second Tewa story (a retelling, in fact), the son of the cacique wishes to travel to the Land of Parrots to obtain a parrot. His mission is successful, and he returns home with a "Parrot Girl" that helps him on the homeward journey. When he arrives at his parents' house, the Parrot Girl becomes a beautiful human girl and marries him.

Charles Frederick Hartt claimed that a tale from the "Paitúna" contains a version where the bird maiden is a parrot. A human male finds her and becomes the mother of a new tribe.

Researchers Darwin Hanna and Mamie Henry collected a Nlaka'pamux tale from teller Annie York, which they translated as The Country Divided. In this tale, a couple lives in Quilchena with their child. After the father dies, the widowed mother raises her son and teaches him everything a father would. When he is old enough, his mother tells him that he must travel a great distance to find a mate. One day, while he is resting, he hears a song and goes to look for its source. He then finds a group of women flying down to a clearing, taking off their clothes and wings, praying for a bit, then entering a nearby body of water to swim. Soon after, the women put on the wings and clothes again and flew to the sky. The next day, the youth surprises the women just as they are taking flight and grabs the youngest woman's clothes. The youth covers her with a deerskin and brings her home to his mother, where she will live with him as his wife.

Folklorist Lewis Spence registered a tale from the Canaris Indians from the province of Canaribamba, in Quito. In this tale, titled The Bird Bride, two brothers survive a flood and take shelter atop a mountain named Huacaquan until the water recedes. They return to the lands and build a house for themselves. They leave the house to gather herbs, and when they return home, they find that their food has been prepared for them. The pair decides to spy on whoever is cooking their food. The next time this happens, two birds, one "Aqua" and the other "Torito" (which Spence calls "quacamayo birds"), alight near the house and become maidens. The elder brother spies on them, but lets them escape. Ten days later, the younger brother takes his chances on the bird-maidens, closing the door on the younger maiden to trap her in the house. The maiden lives with the brothers and gives birth to six sons and daughters, the ancestors of the Canaris.

====== South America: The Vulture Wife ======
German ethnologue John Bierhorst locates the story of the Vulture Wife in Guyana and northern South America, among the Warrao, Arawak, Camaracoto, Taulipang, Makushi, Carib, and the Caliña of Suriname.

In a tale from Guyana, The man with a vulture wife, a young hunter comes across a large house where people are playing sports and dancing to music. In reality, they were vultures that shed their skins to decorate the place. The youth becomes entranced by one of the maidens and captures her. Their marriage is not a happy one, and the tale ends on a darker note. A similar tale is attested from the Warao people, in Venezuela.

Dutch cartographer Claudius de Goeje transcribed a tale from the Arawak, about a medicine man named Makanahoro. In this tale, Makanahoro disguised himself as a carrion deer to attract vultures. He manages to capture a female king vulture who has taken off her vulture plumage and makes her his wife. Some time later, Makanahoro goes with his wife to visit her family in the sky, but his in-laws test his mettle by forcing him to complete tasks. Makanahoro accomplished the tasks (as described in the account) with the help of animals. De Goeje reported similar tales from nearby indigenous populations: the Kaliñas, the Macusis, the Warau (Warao), the Taulipangs, the Tembes, and the Chané-Chriguanos.

Explorer Everard im Thurn provided another account from Guiana: an Indian man marries a female king vulture and, as it is an Arawak custom, goes to live with his wife's family. After some time in the sky-realm, he longs to return to his human family on Earth, which enrages the vulture people. The vulture in-laws drop the hunter on top of an awarra-palm, a plant known for its thorny appearance, and there he stays for some time, until some spiders take pity on him and weave a web for him to climb down the tree. Some birds take the man back to the sky realm and wage war on the vultures. In a more detailed version, the vulture father-in-law is named Anuanima and he is identified as the ruler of this race that lives in the sky.

German ethnologist Theodor Koch-Grunberg collected a version of the Vulture Wife from the Taulipangs (also known as Taurepang, a subgroup of the Pemon people). In this story, which he titled Der Besuch im Himmel ("A Visit to Heaven"), after a war between rival tribes, Kuyalakog and Palawiyang, only a man named Maitchaule (in another translation, Maitxaule) survives. He dreams of a beautiful woman and captures the daughter of the vulture king. He brings her home and orders her to become a woman. Maitchaule goes hunting, fishing, and harvesting vegetables and fruit. While he is away, the vulture turns into a woman and does the chores, but when the man comes home, she turns back into a vulture. One day, Maitchaule discovers her human form and convinces her to live with him as if they were husband and wife. Time passes, and the vulture wife wants to visit her vulture family. The vulture wife returns with her two brothers and takes her human husband to visit her father-in-law, the vulture-king called Kasanapodole. The vulture-king introduces his son-in-law and orders him on difficult tasks: first, to dry out the Kapöpiakupö Lake in two days; second, to build a house on a rock; third, to build a bench with two heads. While in Heaven, Maitchaule is helped by small animals in his tasks.

Koch-Grunberg published a version from the Tembé people, which he titled Die Tochter des Königsgeiers ("The King Vulture's Daughter"): some king vultures shed their feathers to bathe in a lake. A human man builds a hunting lodge and waits for the vulture women to return the next day. When the vulture women return, the man hides the vulture feathers from the woman and takes her as his wife. They have a son. Some time later, the vulture wife wants to visit her family and fashions makeshift wings for her human husband and son from Janiparana leaves. With one of her feathers, she turns the leaves into vulture feathers, and the three fly to the skies. They pass by the house of the Sun and the house of the Moon and reach the King Vulture's house. Later, the King Vulture orders his son-in-law to carve a large canoe in one day; then, the next day, to block a river and bring him the Trahira fish (which are alligators); and lastly to raze a forest to the ground.

John Bierhorst summarized a tale from the Camaracoto, in Guyana: the protagonist is a culture hero named Maichak. He uses rotten meat bait to draw the vultures in hopes of making contact with their chief, but he attracts the vulture chief's daughter, who becomes a woman. The vulture woman takes Maichak to the vulture realm, and their chief agrees to accept the human as his son-in-law, on the condition that he fulfill three tasks: catch all the fish in a lake, build a house on a ledge, and carve a shaman's bench. With the help of animals, Maichak fulfills the tasks.

Walter Roth published a tale from the Warao, from Guyana, which he titled "The Man with a Vulture Wife", the middle of three brothers, who is a good hunter, finds a gathering of people in a house in the forest. These people are dancing and playing the makuari on their instruments, but in reality, they are vultures who have taken off their feathers. The next day, the hunter returns to that same spot, intent on getting one of the women as his wife. He sneaks behind one girl and grabs her as the people, the house, and everything disappear. The girl agrees to be the man's wife, provided he does not thrash her. They live together, and, strangely, the girl does not eat the meat as soon as it is brought home, waiting until the next day. However, the man beats her on three different occasions, despite his previous promise. The girl lends her vulture feathers to her husband so he can visit his father-in-law. Some time later, the man's wife notices that her daughter-in-law is strange, and the man keeps beating his wife. Fed up with her human husband's behaviour, she turns back into a vulture and flies back to the vulture realm. The human husband tries to catch her in mid-flight, to no avail, and misses his wife so much so that he returns to the spot in the forest where the house once stood.

Roth also published two other Guyanese tales. In the first, from the Arawak, titled How the Birds Obtained their Distinctive Markings, the man marries a vulture wife and visits his father-in-law in the vulture realm. He spends some time there, but after a while, he begins to miss his earthly home and wishes to return to visit his mother. In another, titled The Medicine-Man and the Carrion Crows, the protagonist is a medicine man named Makanauro, who captures a vulture woman in human form and marries her.

American anthropologist Charles Wagley collected a tale from the Tenetehara people which he titled The man who married the vulture. In this tale, a Tenetehara man brings home a female king vulture (Gypagus papa) and raises it. Time passes, and the man sighs over the lack of a wife and wishes the bird could become one. He goes to the garden, returns at night, and sees a meal prepared for him. This situation occurs many times, and he discovers that the vulture takes off the feather garments, becomes a woman, and cooks his food. He enters the house and hides the vulture's feather garment. The (now human) vulture explains she wanted to be kind and good to him now that she is grown. They marry. Later, he wishes to visit her relatives, but she warns him against it, since her father, the vulture king, is a dangerous creature. He insists, and she takes him to the vulture realm. Once there, the vulture king orders his human son-in-law to perform tasks for him: to build a canoe in one day (done by woodpeckers); to clear a garden in one day (again done by the woodpeckers), and to start a fire in the middle of the clearing. In the third task, a spider protects the human until the fire burns. Then the Tenetehara man asks the hawks for help against his father-in-law.

In an etiological tale from the Yukpa people collected by Fr. Adolfo de Villamañan with the title Kemoko y Kurumacho, Kemoko makes the Kurumacho, which are vultures, from the earth and they fly to the sky. Kemoko lives in the mountains and longs for a wife, so he catches some fishes, lets the meat rot and rubs itself with the rotten meat to attract the vultures. It happens thus, and he captures a female Kurumacho, then plucks her feathers and takes her for wife. Kemoko and the vulture wife sire Okoshpe, Wamo, Katutu, and Pishíaka, from which the Spaniards and Watiya (white people) come.

In a Warao tale collected by missionary Álvaro M. de Espinosa with the Warao title A Guarao “Bure Cuamana” a Janocoata Yaburuaeyama, translated to Spanish as Cómo un guarao subió a la casa del Zamuro de dos cabezas ("How a Warao climbed up to the house of the Two-Headed Vulture"), a two-headed vulture (Zamuro) lives on the clouds. On the ground, a Warao youth lives in a ranch to learn the job of a güisidatu (a cross between a healer and a religious officiant) by smoking. He leaves the ranch and notices his hunger and tiredness after smoking, so he asks people to lay him to rest near a river for three hours. He readies himself to his rest and places his hands over his eyes, but keeps seeing a vulture flying down on him. When he opens his eyes a third time, he sees the vulture turning into a woman. The vulture woman asks the youth what is he doing. He explains he is resting, but the vulture woman bids him stand, for she will bring him food. The Warao youth asks the woman if she has relatives, which she confirms and asks the youth to fly with her towards their house. He tells her he does not have wings, so she gives him some wings, but he crashes down on the ground on the first flight. The second time, the vulture woman gives him her feathered costume and both fly to the clouds. When they reach land above, they see a house; the Warao youth waits outside while the vulture woman goes to talk to her parents and announces she brought a human she wants to marry. The vulture father already considers him his son-in-law, but wishes to test him first: first, the vulture father, called Burecuamana, asks the Warao to fell down a large tree called "daurocosimo". The Warao youth breaks the axe during the task, when some birds come to help him: they fly in, turn to humans and try to help him, but only the "carpintero" bird fells down the tree. The following day, Burecuamana asks the Warao youth to empty a well and gives him a "mapire" made of shoddy fabric - a bird called Arijabara comes in as bird, turns into a human and empties the well. The vulture father-in-law admits the Warao fulfilled the task, but suspects he had help, thus he asks the youth to bring him many fishes to eat - again, the Warao youth is helped by the same birds as before, which arises the vulture's suspicions. Fourthly, Burecuamana asks the Warao to carve an effigy of him with wood without seeing him. The Warao youth does not know how he can carve without seeing his father-in-law, so he turns into a reptile and crawls into Burecuamana's house. However, since it was made of zinc, the reptile's crawling scares Burecuamana, so the Warao turns into a little ant. He manages to take a good look at his father-in-law and realizes he is a two-headed vulture. Still, he carves an image of him. Lastly, Burecuamana asks the youth to build a house near the place where he landed on the clouds. When the Warao goes to perform the task, a "caballito del diablo" appears, turns into a young man and warns that this last task is a trap, for the vulture wants to devour the youth, so he should escape by stealing some feather clothes to fly away. One day, when the vulture wife is away, the Warao steals the feather cloak and flies down to the ground back to the ranch. On the way down, he notices his wife is flying behind him, bidding him to come back. The Warao rejects the vulture wife's pleas, so she threaten to eat his corpse after he dies. The Warao lands and some indigenous persons ask him where he came from. The Warao explains his trails above the clouds, and the indigenous persons admonish him, since many vultures roam around the place. Then, after he dies, the vulture wife and her father come down to eat the youth's corpse.

===== Latin America =====
In two Argentinian variants, Las tres palomas hijas del diablo ("The three pigeon daughters of the devil") and Blanca Flor, the prince is a gambler who bets and loses against a devil antagonist. To find the devil's house, a donor tells him he should steal the garments of the three daughters of the devil, who come to bathe in the form of doves.

====== Mexico ======
In a Mexican tale, Blanca Flor ("White Flower"), the youth Juan loves to gamble and wins the devil's favor to grant him unbeatable luck for the period of five years. When the date is due, the youth must find the devil "in the Plains of Berlín at the Hacienda of Qui-quiri-qui". He goes on a pilgrimage and asks three hermits (the king of fishes, the king of animals of the earth, and the king of birds of the air) for their location. The eagle, answering its sire's question, knows where it is. The eagle carries Juan to the Plains of Berlín and informs him that three doves, the devil's three daughters, will come to bathe.

In a tale collected by John Bierhorst from a Yucatec Mayan source titled The Bird Bride, something is destroying his father's fields, and he tasks his three sons to guard it. A little toad appears to all three brothers and begs for some food, but only the youngest agrees to share his. The little toad and the youth discover the culprit: a bird - an enchanted maiden - comes to eat in the cornfield. The toad disenchants the maiden, and she marries the youth.

In a Mayan tale collected from Zinacantán with the title Journey to Irdivolveres, collected from informant Rey Komis, three doves come to bathe in a lake and remove their feathers. A man steals the clothes of one of the doves. The other two depart, leaving their companion behind. The dove becomes a woman, the mistress of the river. The human man tells the woman he has fallen in love with her and wishes to marry her. The dove woman agrees, but sets a condition: she will join him in bed at night and he cannot see her face. The man agrees and takes her to his house. At night, however, he lights up a candle and sees her beautiful face during her sleep. He admires her beauty and a drop of wax falls on her face. The dove woman wakes up and admonishes the human for his betrayal, then departs to her parents' house, in Irdivolveres. The man mourns for his missing wife, but decides to search for her. He goes to Mother Wind in search of answers, and she tells him to pay the Whirlwind, who agrees to take him to his grandfather. The Wind tells the man he can take him to Irdivolveres and ferries him on an aerial journey. The man reaches his wife's realm and lands. His father-in-law sees him and orders him to clear the road. The dove wife advises her husband to fetch a dull tool, and he picks up a hoe and starts working. The man can barely perform the task when his wife brings him some tortillas, and offers her help, finishing the task for him. Next, the dove woman's father tells the man to clear the underbrush - once again, the dove woman uses her abilities to fulfill her husband's task. Lastly, the father-in-law orders the man to plant and harvest - the man's wife does the task for him. The man tells his father-in-law to check that the task has been fulfilled, and marries the dove woman to the human, who becomes the chief, the king of the world.

====== Brazil ======
In a tale collected by Sílvio Romero in Rio de Janeiro (Cova da Linda Flôr), a king gambles with another monarch. He loses everything and consults with a hermit on how to proceed. The hermit advises killing a special kind of bird from which a piece of paper will drop with instructions: three princesses, daughters of the monarch, in the form of ducks, bathe in a lake, and the king should take the duck skin of the youngest (whose name is Cova da Linda Flôr).

Marco Haurélio, contemporary writer and folklorist, collected two versions in Brazil wherein the hero steals the bird-maiden's clothes: Guime e Guimar (Guime e Guimar), published in the book Contos Folclóricas Brasileiros (Brazilian Folk Tales), in which the princess is enchanted in a paw, and Guimar e Guimarim (Guimar and Guimarim), published in the book Vozes da Tradição (Voices of Tradition), both classified under type 313A in the Aarne-Thompson-Uther Index (The Girl as Helper in the Hero's Flight).

=== Non-bird maidens ===
Despite the near universality of the tale of the swan maiden (or maiden who transforms into any other kind of bird), there are tales where the human male still holds the maiden's garments. Still, the narrative does not mention whether she transforms.

In a tale titled The Iron Eagle, a young hunter reaches the sandy shores on the edge of a forest. He then sees three maidens arriving in a flash of light to take a bath "in the golden sunrise". The hunter steals their clothing, unaware that one of the maidens is "The Daughter of the Sun". In exchange for her garment back, she will grant one out of four wishes.

==== Western Europe ====
The tale of the swan maiden is believed to be attested in Lady Featherflight, a tale obtained from an English storyteller (an old aunt). Lady Featherflight helps the hero against her giant father and both escape (ATU 313 The Magical Flight).

Emmanuel Cosquin collected a French tale titled Chatte Blanche (English: "White Cat"), where the hero Jean is informed that "Plume Verte", "Plume Jaune" and "Plume Noir" come to bathe in the lake in the Black Forest, and is tasked with getting the robes of "Plume Verte".

On his comments on the English fairy tale Lady Featherflight, W. W. Newell commented that in the French counterpart of the story, La Plume Verte (English: "The Green Feather"), the name is an indication of her status as bird-maiden. However, it has been noted that, as it happened in both versions, the swan maiden's feathery cloak was replaced by the garment, yet a reminiscence of it is retained in their names.

A similar occurrence appears in a fairy tale from Brittany, La Demoiselle en Blanc ("The Lady in White"), collected by Paul Sébillot: the young man sees three human maidens bathing, and nearby there are three dresses, a white one, a gray one, and a blue one. It has been noted that the tale contains a nearly identical episode of the maidens bathing, instead of the bird-maidens.

In another Brittany tale, collected by François-Marie Luzel, Barbauvert, ou Le Prince qui Joua la Tête et la Perdit ("Green Beard, or The Prince that gambled his head and lost it"), Prince Charles, son of the king of France, gambles and loses a bet against Barbauvert. The man asks the prince to find his castle. Charles meets a hermit who tells him that three maidens will come in three golden chairs and will descend near a lake. One of them is Koantic, the youngest daughter of the Green Beard, who will help the prince with her father's tasks.

In the Irish tale Yellow Lily, the son of the king of Erin gambles his head against the cruel Giant of Loch Lein and must travel to the giant's castle after losing the bet. During his travels, he meets an older woman in a hut who informs him that the three daughters of the giant, Blue Lily, White Lily, and Yellow Lily, will come to bathe in a nearby lake, and that he should steal the garments of the youngest, Yellow Lily.

In another Irish tale, The King's Son in Erin and the King of Green Island, collected by Jeremiah Curtin and later published by Séamus Ó Duilearga, the king's son is defeated by a small grey man. He orders him to find his castle in Green Island within a year and a day. After a long journey, an eagle directs him to the three daughters of the king of Green Island and steals the bracelet of the youngest of them. He returns it to her; they fall in love, and she agrees to help him with his father's tasks.

==== Northern Europe ====
In a Norwegian variant, a stranger named "the ninth Momorius" helps the hero, and he has to find his house as payment. The hero meets one of Momorius's sons and is directed to his youngest sister, who lives by a lake. When he arrives, the hero steals Momorius's daughter's clothes and asks for her help. Norwegian folklorist Reidar Thoralf Christiansen recognized that the stealing of the sister's clothes was "clearly a much worn down use of the Swan-maiden incident".

==== Southern Europe ====
In a Galician tale, Brancafrol, a gambling youth bets and loses his soul, and is given a deadline to surrender it to the winner. After giving alms to an old lady, she informs him of three magical maidens bathing in the sea: two Moorish women, and a Christian woman, who have set their dresses on the shore (the Moorish women's green ones and the Christian woman's white ones).

Francisco Maspons y Labrós collected a Catalan variant titled Lo castell del Sol ("The Castle of the Sun"), where a young count bets and loses his wealth and must find his way to "The Castle of the Sun". Not knowing of its location, he is helped by an old lady and her sons, who tell of a lake where three maidens come to bathe. When escaping from her family, the count calls his wife "Rosa florida".

==== Central Europe ====
In an Austrian (Tirol) tale collected by Joseph and Ignaz Zingerle, Der gläserne Berg ("The Glass Mountain"), a forester's son, while hiding in the bushes, sees three maidens bathing and fetches their cloaks. Later, the maidens arrive at his house and ask for their garments back. He returns to two of the maidens, retaining the youngest and marrying her. The couple lives quite happily until, one day, the husband forgets to lock the cabinet where he hid her cloak, and she finds it. The maiden writes him a note saying that, if he loves her, he should seek her in "The Glass Mountain".

In a Swiss tale from Unterengadin, Der Glasberg oder Das Glasschloss ("The Glass Mountain or the Glass Castle"), a youth and his widowed mother live in a house in the woods. One day, he is cutting some wood when he sees ten flying maidens alighting near a lake and taking off their wings to bathe. The youth is astonished by such a sight. The next day, he watches the scene and convinces himself the maidens are real, intending to take the youngest as his wife. The third time, he digs a hole and hides in it to steal the maiden's wings as soon as she descends. He is successful, and the maiden is presented to his mother as his wife. He hides the clothing in a locked compartment and gives the key to his mother, but one day she forgets to lock it. So the maiden regains her wings and tells the old woman that her son should find her "in the Glass Mountain". The youth, now inconsolable, goes on a quest to get her back. He visits the abode of the Moon, the Sun, and the Wind and obtains their help. He finally reaches the Glass Mountain and meets his mother-in-law, who asks him to perform three tasks, the last of which is to recognize his wife from her nine identical sisters. He is also successful. Soon after, the pair escapes from the Glass Mountain (ATU 313, "The Magic Flight") and returns home.

==== Eastern Europe ====
In a Polish tale by A. J. Gliński, O nahajce wykonajce, butachsamoskokach, czapce niewidce, i ogórze miedzianej ("The Princess of The Brazen Mountain"), the hero is a prince who steals the titular princess's pair of wings and proposes to her. On their wedding day, she is given back the wings and flies back to the Brazen Mountain.

In a tale collected by Francis Hindes Groome (The Witch) from a Polish-Gypsy source, the prince dreams of a place where lovely maidens were bathing. He decides to travel the world to find this place. He does so and hides the wings of the youngest maiden. After his wife escapes, he follows her to her family's home and must work for her sorcerous mother.

In the Russian folktale Yelena the Wise, the titular princess and her maid, both with wings, were imprisoned by a six-headed serpent until Ivan, the soldier, accidentally released them. Ivan informs the six-headed serpent of her escape, and the monster says the princess is cunning. Hot on her trail, he uses a flying carpet to reach a beautiful garden with a pond. Soon after, Yelena and her maid arrive and take off their wings to bathe.

In a Wallachian tale collected by Arthur and Albert Schott, Der verstoßene Sohn, a youth shoots a raven, which falls in the snow. The striking image makes the boy long for a bride "of white skin, red cheeks and hair black as a raven's feathers". An old man tells him of such beauty: three "Waldjungfrauen" ("forest-maidens") will come to bathe in the lake, and he must secure the crown of one of them. He fails twice, but succeeds in his third attempt. The youth and the forest maiden live together for many years; she bears him two sons, but during a village celebration, she asks for her crown back. When she puts on her head, she begins to ascend in flight with their two children and asks her husband to find them.

In a Ukrainian tale from Bukovina, titled "Жінка, що мала крила" ("The Woman Who Had Wings"), a youth named Petryk lives with his father and hunts in the woods. One day, he stops to rest by a meadow and sees three winged maidens descend from the skies, take off their wings to dance in the meadow, and fly back to the skies. Petryk tells his father he fell in love with the winged maiden. His father advises him to go to the meadow early, dig out a hole to hide in, and wait for the maidens to come; when they doff their wings, Petryk is to steal the pair that belongs to the youngest of them - the one that Petryk fell in love with. Petryk follows his father's advice and fetches her wings, while her companions fly away to the skies. Petryk takes her wings home and locks them up in a chest. The winged maiden marries Petryk and gives birth to a son. Some time later, during a wedding celebration in the village, the winged maiden dances and impresses the crowd, and says she can dance even better if she has her wings. The guests accost Petryk and ask him to bring his wife's wings. He relents and gives his wife the wings; she puts them on, dances, and grabs her son to fly away from the village. Petryk begins to search for his wife and son. After wearing out some pairs of shoes, he finds three brothers quarreling over their father's inheritance, an invisible cap, a pair of boots, and a banyak. He uses the boots to reach his wife's hut in a distant forest, and meets his son Mykhailo just outside his mother's hut.

==== Greece ====
Von Hahn also collected similar stories from Ioannina and Zagori, and called the swan maiden-like character "Elfin".

==== Asia ====
In a tale collected from a Dagur source, in China, a man tells his three sons of a dream he had: a white horse that appeared, circled the sun, and vanished into the sea. His sons decide to find this horse. The youngest succeeds in capturing the horse, but it says it will feel lonely away from its home, so the horse decides to bring one of his sisters with him. The youth and the horse await at the beach for the arrival of ten fairies, who take off their clothes to play in the sea. Soon enough, the youth seizes the clothing of the youngest.

In a tale collected in the Konkani language, The Bird Princess and the Boy, a king with seven sons asks them a question: who are they most afraid of? The older six boys answer: "the king", which pleases him. When the youngest says he most fears God, the king whips him eight times and abandons him in the forest. The boy wanders about and reaches an old lady's cottage. He works as a goatherd and is warned not to go beyond the garden. He disobeys and sees a lake where two princesses are bathing, their dresses that allow them to fly cast off nearby. He steals the dress of one of them, but the maiden regains it. On the second day, he manages to steal the clothing of the second one and hide beneath the house floor. A king dies, and three elephants carry the crown to the boy. He marries the flying princess. When the old lady dies, the princess finds the magical clothing and flies back to her kingdom. On his way there, the boy rescues frogs, mongooses, and flies, whose help he uses to fulfill three tasks before winning back his wife.

In a tale from the Jibbali language of Oman, translated as A Man and His Jinn Wife, a man has a plantation of date palms that bear fruit, but someone has stealing them. He consults with a medicine man who advises him to hide among the bushes and wait for three "girl ghosts" who will come, doff their clothes, and take a dip in the well, so he should steal their clothes and choose the one he likes best. The man follows his advice, and on that same night, three girls come to the plantation. He steals the garments of one of them. The trio asks for them back; he returns two of them and keeps the third, making the third girl his wife. He later goes back to his mother's home and asks her to hide his wife's clothes. One day, while the man is away, there is a celebration in the village, and the girl asks her mother-in-law for the garments back so she can dance with the women, but she refuses. The local ruler orders her to fetch the garments, which she does; the girl puts them on and flies away. As her son returns home, the woman tries to fool her son into believing his wife died, but relents and tells him the truth. The man consults with the medicine man again, who tells him to prepare three she-camels (white, red, and black), and feed them for three years. The man also marries his three sisters to three jinn brothers-in-law, then sets out towards the sunrise in search of his wife. He passes by the houses of his three brothers-in-law and gains from each of them a tuft of hair for him to burn and summon them in case he needs any help. Finally, he reaches his wife's village in the land of the jinn and meets her. She is surprised to see him there and bids him return; otherwise, her family will kill him, but he insists on staying, so she hides her human husband. The jinn girl tricks her father into making a vow to protect her, and she introduces them to each other. The man declares he will only leave the land of jinn with his wife, and his father-in-law orders him on three tasks: to drink up a whole lagoon, carry up a mountain a goblet of oil and not spill any drop, and lastly eat up three camels. The man burns the tufts of hair from his brothers-in-law, who come to his aid and fulfill the tasks for him. At last, the man returns home with his jinn wife.

==== Africa ====
In an Algerian tale, La Djnoun et le Taleb, the taleb Ahmed ben Abdallah arrives at the edge of a lake and sees a beautiful Djnoun bathing in the water. He soon notices the "dove-skin" of the maiden and hides it. They marry and raise a family with several children. One day, one of their children finds their mother's magical garment and delivers it to her.

==== America ====
===== North America =====
In a tale collected from the Sahaptin, a boy becomes poor. Later, he plays cards with a Black storekeeper. The boy wins the Black man's store and livestock. He then bets himself: if he loses, he becomes the boy's servant. The Black man wins back the store and the livestock, and the boy as his servant, but the Black man dismisses him and tells the boy to go to a place across the river. An old woman stops him from crossing the river and tries to help the boy by "ask[ing] different things": the dishes, the spoons, the cat, the rooster and the geese. The woman translates what the geese have informed: the boy must seek some bathing maidens and secure the "blue-green garters" of the last bathing girl.

J. Alden Mason collected a tale from the Uintah Utes from Whiterocks, Utah, with the title Nṍwintc's adventure with the Bird-Girls and their people. In this tale, a man named Nṍwintc wanders in the wilderness and tries to hunt a deer, but the animal pleads for its life and tells the hunter about a nearby lake where two women are bathing. Nṍwintc goes to verify the deer's story and finds two women "that looked something like birds", one yellow, the other green, and steals their garments. Both women want their garments back, and Nṍwintc returns them. They play and frolic for the night, then go to sleep, but, since the women pretend to be asleep, they sneak off in the dead of night. The next morning, Nṍwintc goes after them; on the way, he meets some boys who give him eagle-feathers and a veil that grants invisibility. Nṍwintc first meets the green girl and her family, who want to get rid of him and impose trials on him. The human hunter prevails, marries the green girl, and they have a daughter. Nṍwintc, however, wants to visit the yellow girl and meets her family, and a similar event happens to him. Nṍwintc also marries the yellow girl, and they have two sons. Eventually, both families meet.

Anthropologist Robert H. Lowie collected a tale from the Shoshone with the title The Supernatural Wife: a human hunter (Ute) tries to kill a deer, but the animal pleads for its life and directs the hunter to a lake where two women are bathing, one with a red dress, and the other with a white dress. The human hunter meets the maiden in white garments, and she gives him a ring. They lie together for the night, and the next morning, the couple finds themselves in a nice house. A white man sees the house and the woman and reports to the town governor, who conspires with the white man to kill the Ute and take his house and his wife. The governor, then, imposes impossible tasks on the Ute hunter: to get the blood of a soldier, the yaɣa'pwa'tu (tears of the birds), and to bathe in boiling water. With his wife's help, he triumphs over the governor. However, one day, the woman asks her Ute husband not to call her "Piñon-cones-on-the-ground-woman", but the man forgets and calls her that. She disappears the next morning, and he goes after her. On the road, he steals three objects from two girls and a boy: a club, a woman's leggings, and a hat - all sent by his wife. He finds his wife at her mother's house, and his mother-in-law forces him to do chores. The woman, however, convinces her Ute husband to escape from the house.

===== Central America =====
In a Jamaican tale, Jack and the Devil Errant, the protagonist Jack loses a bet against the titular Devil Errant and is ordered to find him in three months. An older man helps him by saying that the Devil Errant's three daughters will come to bathe in a lake, but he should steal only the clothing of the youngest.

In another Jamaican tale, with a heavy etiological bent and possibly starring the legendary trickster hero Anansi, the protagonist, a young man, defeats a "headman" (an African king), and the youth's nurse warns him that the king may be planning a trap. The nurse, then, advises the youth that he should take "the river-road" and reach a stream where the king's youngest daughter will be bathing. He steals the clothing twice: the first time, the youth lies that a thief was nearby; the second time, that a gust of wind blew them away.

A tale was collected in 1997 from a 65-year-old Belizean storyteller, Ms. Violet Wade, that focuses on the maiden's father's backstory. In this story, Green Seal, an orphaned prince becomes king, rescues a princess, and marries her. Years later, they have three daughters (one of whom is Green Seal), to whom the king, a wizard, teaches magic. The three maidens fly to a river to bathe, and a poor boy, Jack, steals Green Seal's clothes. They agree to marry, but first, Jack must perform tasks for her father.

== Celestial maiden or heavenly bride ==
A second format of the supernatural wife motif pertains to tales where the maiden isn't a shapeshifting animal but instead a creature or inhabitant of Heaven, a Celestial Realm, or one who hails from the place where the gods live. (Note: "The origin of the "Swan-maiden" is closely connected with the "heavenly nymph", but it is not exactly the same (...)") Western works commonly translate these characters as "fairies" or "nymphs".

Japanese folklorist Seki Keigo names this story "The Wife from the Upper World", in his index of "Types of Japanese Folktales". Similarly, scholar Kunio Yanagita titled it The Wife from the Sky World. Professor Alan L. Miller calls it "The Divine Wife", which can also refer to the Swan Maiden tales. East Asian scholarship also names this group of tales as The Legend of the Winged Robe (or Tale of the Feathered Cloak) and Celestial Wife.

=== Distribution ===
Korean scholarship holds that the bird wife and animal transformation were replaced by a human-looking supernatural woman with wings or a magical garment in regions that lacked contact with swans, such as India, Southeast Asia, Korea, and Japan.

=== India and South Asia ===
According to scholarship, the motif of the celestial bride whose clothes are stolen by a mortal warrior is popular in Indian literary and oral tradition.

The motif of the swan maiden is also associated with the Apsaras, of Hinduism, who descend from Heaven or a Celestial Realm to bathe in an earthly lake. One example is the ancient tale of apsara Urvasi and king Pururavas. In another tale, cited by folklorist Hartland, five asparas, "celestial dancers", are transported by an enchanted car to take a bath in the forest.

A folk song collected from the state of Chhattisgarh, The Ballad of flower-maid Bakaoli, contains the episode where a male (Lakhiya) is informed by a sadhu about the seven daughters of Indra Rajá (one of whom is Bakaoli) who bathe in a lake.

A tale of Dravidian origin tells the story of Prince Jagatalapratapa, who encounters the daughter of Indra and her maids in a grove in the forest. A second story of The Dravidian Nights Entertainment, by Natesa Sastri, shows the episode of the prince stealing clothes from a celestial maiden, as part of the prince's search for a special flower.

A story obtained from Santal sources (Toria the Goatherd and the Daughter of the Sun) tells of goatherd Toria. After the Daughters of the Sun descend to earth on a spider's thread, the maidens invite Toria to join them in their leisure in the water. The goatherd, then, convinces the girls to see who can stay underwater for the longest time. While they are distracted, Toria hides the clothing of one of them – the one he found most lovely – and flees home with it.

In a Bengali tale, from Dinajpur (The Finding of the Dream), prince Siva Das receives a premonitory dream about a maiden. Some time later, he is informed by a sage that, on a night of full moon, five nymphs descend from the sky to play in a pond, and one of them is the maiden he saw in a dream, named Tillottama.

In a tale from the Karbi people, Harata Kunwar, the youngest of seven brothers flees for his life from home after his brothers and father threaten to kill him and takes refuge with an old lady. After doing his chores, he plans to take a bath in the river, but is told not to go upstream. He does so and sees the six daughters of the King of the Great Palace descending from the heavens and undressing to bathe and frolic in the water. (Note: Its collectors supposed this story originated from an Indian source, since the hero's name reminded them of Sarat-Kumar.)

Author Mark Thornhill published a tale titled The Perfumer's Daughter, set in India. In this tale, the prince's wife asks for her ring and flies off to unknown parts. Burdened with grief, the prince wanders the world until he finds an old ascetic master. The ascetic tells the prince that, on the full moon night, his wife and her handmaidens will descend from the heavens to bathe in the lake, and the youth must acquire his wife's shawl.

The Indian folktale collection Kathasaritsagara contains at least two similar tales involving Apsaras: the tale of Marubhúti who, instructed by a hermit, steals the clothing of one of some heavenly nymphs who came to bathe in the river, and the hermit becomes the mortal husband of the Vidyadhara. In a second story, deity Bhairava commands Thinthákarála to steal the garments of the Apsaras that were bathing in "the holy pool of Mahákála". After the deed is done, the Apsaras protest and beg for their garments to be returned, but the youth sets a condition: he will return them in exchange for the youngest Apsara, Kalávatí, daughter of Alambushá, to become his wife.

In another Indian tale, The Wood-seller and the Seven Fairies, the wood-seller takes a moment to rest in the forest, and soon sees seven fairies bathing at a well. He soon steals their garments and asks for their help to impress a visiting queen he wishes to marry.

=== Southeast Asia ===
Professor Margaret Kartomi stated that "countless versions" of the tale of the human male who marries one of seven heavenly females (or angels) after stealing her clothing appear in "insular and mainland Southeast Asia".

==== Mainland ====
In a tale from Laos, The Faithful Husband, Chow Soo Tome, a lord, sees seven winged nymphs bathing. They notice his presence and flee, except one. They marry, and his mother hides her wings, so she cannot fly back. The head chow sends Soo Tome to war, and the nymph, out of sorrow, asks her mother-in-law for her wings back. She dons her wings and flies back to her father's kingdom of Chom Kow Kilat. Chow Soo Tome discovers his wife fled and goes on a quest to win her back.

In a Vietnamese tale, a woodcutter finds the spring where the fairies (Nàng tiên) come to bathe. He hides the clothes of the youngest fairy and marries her. The youth hides the garment in the rice shed, but his wife finds it and goes back to the upper world. However, she leaves her child with her comb as a memento.

Anthropologist Mrs. Leslie Milne collected a tale from the Shan people which she titled The Fairy and the Hunter. In this tale, because a village chief fails to offer the gods their due, the spirits convene and seek the crocodile, the ruler of the water bodies, for a decision. The crocodile agrees to punish the villagers by drying up the water sources. After three years, the village chief consults with a soothsayer, who sends a wise man to kill the crocodile. The wise man goes to the animal and shoots an arrow at one of its eyes. The next time, the crocodile sees a hunter nearby and pleads for help, in exchange for anything the human wishes for. The hunter agrees to the proposal and kills the wise man. Later, seven fairies come from their celestial abode in the "silver mountain in heaven" to bathe in the lake. The crocodile agrees to help the hunter and gives him a rope of precious stones, which he uses on the seven maidens the next time they fly down to earth. Trapped in the rope, the girls plead for release, and the hunter lets them go, but says he wants the youngest of them as his wife.

==== Maritime ====
According to linguist Sidney Herbert Ray, the Sanskrit word vidyādhari was borrowed into the Malayo-Polynesian languages of the region. Thus, it appears as bidadari in Malay and Makassar and as widadari in Javanese, both denoting a nymph or fairy. Similarly, James George Frazer noted that this was a "common story", told in Indonesia and in the Malay-Polynesian region.

===== Malaysia =====
In the story (hikayat) of Hikayat Inderaputera, prince Inderaputera (Indraputra) travels the world to find a cure for a king's childlessness. He obtains information from a peri that Princess Gemala Ratna Suri and her seven nymph attendants will come in seven days to bathe in the lake, and he should steal the flying jackets of the maidens to advance in his quest.

In another Malay hikayat, Prince Malim Deman has a dream vision of a holy man pointing to a place upstream where he can find a wife. There, he will find seven heavenly maidens who descended to the mortal realm to play in the pond of the fairy woman Ninek Kebayan. The prince meets Ninek Kebayan, who helps him steal the clothing of the most beautiful of the heavenly maidens, Puteri Bongsu (Poeteri Boengsoe), and make her his wife. In another version, provided by a "respected ancestor" named Bujang XI, protagonist Malin Deman marries Dewa Indurjati. Otherwise, the tale shows the same ending, with the celestial maiden regaining her clothes and returning to the skies.

A similar plot can be found in another hikayat, named Hikayat Malim Dewa (or Malém Diwa), where prince Malim Dewa marries the heavenly nymph (princess) Poetroë Boengthoe, whose magical garments he stole to prevent her return to the celestial abode.

===== Philippines =====
====== Overview ======
The narrative of the swan maiden or heavenly wife was noted to be found "all across the Philippines", being told in the following ethnic groups, according to professors Hazel Wrigglesworth and Richard Dorson: Tinguian, Amganad Ifugao, Kallahan Keley-i, Casiguran Dumagat, Mamanwa, Binukid, Ata of Davao, Dibabawon, Sindangan Subanon, Siocon Subanon, Ilianen Manobo, Livunganen Manobo, Sarangani Manobo, Maguindanao, and Tausug.

====== Regional tales ======
In the tale Kimod and the Swan Maiden ("Pitong Maylog"), from the Mansaka (Philippines), Kimod, a young hunter, captures the garments of one bathing maiden and marries her. Some time later, the maiden discovers its hiding place: inside her husband's blowgun. She wears it again and rejoins her sisters in the skyworld. Kimod, then, goes on a quest to bring her back. According to Herminia Q. Meñez, versions are reported to have been found in other groups in Mindanao and northern Luzon.

Other variants from Filipino folklore include: The Seven Young Sky Women; Magbolotó, a tale from the Visayan. A version of the tale was also found in the oral narratives of the Agta people of the Philippines (How Juan got his Wife from Above).

===== Indonesia =====
====== Overview ======
The heavenly maidens are also known in Indonesia as Bathing Beauties or The Seven Nymphs, tales wherein a male character spies on seven celestial maidens (Apsaras) bathing in an earthly lake. (Note: As remarked by Indonesian scholarship, the number of nymphs or heavenly maidens varies according to region: three, five, eight, nine, ten, twelve, even 39 or 41.) Indonesian scholarship states that the tale is "widespread in almost all parts of Indonesia": North Sumatra, Maluku, Bengkulen, East Kalimantan, Madura, West Sulawesi, Java and Bali. In that regard, professor James Danandjaja acknowledged this wide diffusion, but emphasized the existence of the story "among the ethnic groups that were influenced by Hindu-Buddhist and Han (Chinese) cultures".

====== Regional tales ======
One famous version from Indonesian history is titled ''Jaka Tarub and Seven Apsaras'', from the island of Java, starring legendary Javanese hero Jaka Tarub, who marries the heavenly nymph (Bidadari) Dewi Nawang Wulan. This story is said to be popular on this island, especially in East and Central Java.

Similar tales were collected from North Sulawesi and Minahasa Peninsula (formerly known as Celebes Islands). One is the tale of Kasimbaha and Utahagi: Kasimbaha fetches the garments of Utahagi, a "heavenly nymph" who was bathing in a lake, and, later, after his wife returns to her celestial abode, he climbs a special tree to ascend to the heavens and find her again. A second tale is interesting in that it differs: instead of bathing in a lake, the heavenly maidens descend to Earth and steal the yams of a human farmer named Walasindouw.

In Bengkulu, in the island of Sumatra, the legend of Malin Deman is quite close to the motif of the "Celestial Wife": hero Malin Deman steals the wings and the clothes of the youngest of "Seven Angels" who have come to the terrestrial plane to bathe. They soon marry and have a child, but years later, she returns to her celestial realm. Another Sumatran tale is the story of Lidah Pahit and Puyang Bidodari (Putri Bungsu).

Amongst the Karo people of Indonesia, the tale of the hero Si Mandupa tells of his marriage to one of the seven anak dibata ("children of divinity") after stealing her clothing. Some time later, her husband returns her clothes, and she flies back to heaven, prompting an arduous quest to bring her back home.

In a Madura tale, ''Aryo Menak'', the titular hero marries one of seven "angels", named Tunjung Wulan. One day, the angel wife tells her husband not to visit her in the kitchen whenever she is cooking. He breaks this prohibition, and she departs back to her sisters.

In a tale from the Aceh region, ''Malim Dewa'', published by M. J. Melalatoa and translated by Krishna, orphaned youth Malim Dewa ventures through a thick forest near the Pesangan river, in search of a golden-bodied maiden he saw in a dream. He dreams of seven golden-bodied maidens bathing and frolicking in a river nearby, then he wakes. He soon meets an old lady named Inen Keben, who reveals that the seven maidens bathe in Atu Pepangiren on Mondays and Thursdays, and tells him that if she secures her garment, she shall remain on earth. The plan works, and the maiden, named Putri Bensu, is taken by Inen as another companion. Malim and Putri Bensu meet in person, marry, and have a son named Amat Banta. One day, the child plays with the ashes in Inen's hut, and Putri Bensu discovers her stolen garment. She dons it again and leaves the hut with the child, back to the skies.

In a tale from South Kalimantan, Telaga Bidadari, a man named Awang Sukma becomes a datu (a title of rulership). One day, while playing his flute, he hears a noise nearby and goes to investigate. He sees seven angels or nymphs bathing in a lake (Sungai Raya or Bidadari Lake). He falls in love with the youngest and steals her garment. When it is time to depart, six of the women wear their clothes, but not the youngest, Putri Bungsu. They leave her there, but Awang Sukma finds her. They marry and have a daughter named Kumalasari. Their happiness is short-lived when Putri Bungsu finds her stolen garment in the garden and flies back to the heavens.

A similar story is reported to act as a foundational myth of the historical kingdoms of North Maluku: a man named Jafar Sadek arrives from Arabia to the coast of Tarnore. There, he sees seven bathing maidens (heavenly maidens), and falls in love with the youngest, named Nur Safa. He steals her winged robe and strands her on Earth. He hides her clothing, marries her, and she bears him three sons and four daughters. One day, Nur Safa finds her garments and flies back to the skies, leaving her family behind. Jafar Sadek learns of her disappearance and is taken by an eagle to the Sky Realm. There, he meets his father-in-law and is put to a test: he must identify Nur Safa amid a parade of identical maidens.

A story from the Bugis people attests the descent of seven celestial nymphs to bathe in an earthly lake, and a man who steals the garments of the youngest to make her his wife.

In a foundational myth of the Pantar island, a man is abandoned on an island, but is saved by a bird-woman whose robe of feathers he steals and hides, making him his wife. They have seven children, five sons and two daughters, and he tries to discover the genealogy of his celestial wife by a violent ruse. The bird-wife feels insulted, finds her robe of feathers, hidden inside a bamboo stick, and flies away to the skies, leaving her children with their father. The myth then continues with the division of the island between his sons.

Other tales are attested in the many traditions of the archipelago: from the Island of Halmahera, the episode of "stealing maiden's clothing while in a bath" occurs as part of the quest of the youngest of seven brothers for a remedy for his father; from the Island of Bali, the story of Rajapala and Vidyadhari Ken Sulasih, parents of hero Durma; the heroic poem Ajar Pikatan, narrating the quest for celestial maiden Suprabha; The Legend of Pasir Kujang, from West Java; Raja Omas and Mahligai Keloyang.

=== East Asia ===
East Asian folkloric traditions also attest to similar tales about celestial maidens.

A tale from Lew Chew was related by Envoy Li Ting-yuan, circa the beginning of the 19th century: a farmer, Ming-Ling-Tzu, who owns a pristine fountain of the purest water, sees a maiden fair bathing in the water source and possibly soiling it. He notices the maiden's garments, of a "ruddy sunset colour", draped nearby in a pine tree. He gets her garments and does not return them to her. The man marries the maiden, they live together for ten years, and have a son and a daughter. One day, when her husband is away, the mysterious maiden climbs a tree and ascends to the sky, leaving her human family forever.

==== China ====
===== Overview =====
Scholar James H. Grayson dates the appearance of the tale in Chinese sources to some time after the second century B.C.

In the first catalogue of Chinese folktales (devised in 1937), Wolfram Eberhard abstracted a Chinese folktype indexed as number 34, Schwanenjungfrau ("The Swan Maiden"): a poor human youth is directed to the place where supernatural women bathe by a cow or a deer; the women may be Swan Maidens, a celestial weaver, one of the Pleiades, one of the "9 Celestial Maidens", or a fairy; he steals the garments of one of them and makes her his wife; she finds the garments and flies back to Heaven; the youth goes after her, and meets her in the Heavenly realm; the Heavenly king decrees that the couple shall meet only once a year. Based on some of the variants available then, Eberhard dated the story to the 5th century, although the tale seems much older, with references to it in the Huainanzi (2nd century BC).

===== Regional tales =====
Another related tale is the Chinese myth of the Cowherd and the Weaver Girl, in which one of seven fairy sisters is taken as a wife by a cowherd who hid the seven sisters' robes; she becomes his wife because he sees her naked, and not so much due to his taking her robe. In some versions of the story, the Cowherd character has a brother and a sister-in-law, and a buffalo guides the youth to the place where the heavenly maidens are bathing (either the Weaver Maiden alone, or a group of maidens).

A similar story is the tale of Tian Xian Pei, also known as "The Fairy Couple"; "The Marriage of the Fairy Princess" or "Dong Yong, the Filial Son". According to professor Wilt Idema, there is a sequel to the story of Dong Yong, where his son, Dong Zhong, discovers his mother is the heavenly fairy who will come down to earth to bathe in the Anavatapta Pond. He is instructed to steal his mother's magical robe.

Chinese literature attests an untitled version in Soushen Ji, as the fifteenth tale in Volume 14.

==== Japan ====
===== Overview =====
According to professor Hiroko Ikeda's Index of Japanese Folktales, the international type 400 is equally classified as type 400, "The Man on a Quest for his Lost Celestial Wife (Hagoromo, Tennin Nyoobo)": a man is directed to a lake where seven celestial maidens are bathing, either by a deer or as answer to his prayers; he steals the magical robe of one of the maidens and makes her his wife in the terrestrial world; later, she regains the garments and flies back to the celestial realm; the hunter follows his wife's instructions to find her again and goes to the celestial realm, where he has to perform tasks for his father-in-law, which he does with his wife's help (tale type 313). At the end of the tale, the man is warned against eating a melon, but cuts one open, and its water gushes forth torrentially, separating man and wife, who can only meet again on July 7. According to Ikeda, sixty variants are registered in Japan, and the narrative is connected to ponds and lakes.

In the Japanese legend of Hagoromo, it is a heavenly spirit, or Tennin, that comes to earth and has her robe stolen by a human hunter. Some tales even cross over with the legend of the Tanabata.

The earliest record of the tale is found in the Fudoki, an ancient book of provincial and oral accounts, dated to the 8th century. Professor Hazel Wigglesworth wrote that there were 46 versions of the tale collected in Japanese oral sources. Ikeda, on the other hand, reported 59 versions found across Japan, while Japanologist Carmen Blacker asserted its wide diffusion "from Aomori to Kyūshū".

Comparative scholarship on the Japanese variants points out that at the beginning of the story, the human male goes near a lake for a variety of reasons (a prayer to the gods for a wife; a vision sent in a dream; a grateful animal points him the way). Over the course of the story, the human partner reaches the celestial realm where his wife and her family live. Once there, he is forced to perform tasks before they reunite. At the end of the narrative, the husband breaks a taboo (he should not eat a certain melon/gourd, but he does and is washed away) and he and his celestial wife are separated, only to reunite again during the night of July 7.

===== Regional tales =====
James Danandjaja related the Japanese tale of Amafuri Otome ("The Woman who came from the Sky"), a similar tale of an unmarried mortal man named Mikeran who withholds the kimono from a bathing lady in exchange for her becoming his wife. He also compared it to the Swan Maiden and to the myth of The Cowherd and the Weaver. As the tale continues, Mikeran fashions a thousand straw sandals to reach the sky world and find his wife. When he meets his in-laws, the father-in-law forces him to perform tasks and tricks the human into believing he can cut a thousand watermelons in one day. The human's sky wife knows it is a trap, but he does it anyway and is washed away by a flood caused by the watermelons. Thus, they can only meet on the night of the Tanabata festival.

Tales collected from Ōmi Province (Ika no Woumi) and Suruga Province (Miho Matsubara) are close to the human husband/swan spouse narrative. In contrast, in a story from Tango Province (Taniha no Kori), it is an elderly couple who strand the celestial maiden on Earth; she becomes their adopted daughter to keep them company. In addition, versions collected from Omi Province also show that the celestial maiden or divine fairy character became entwined locally with Shinto deity Sugawara no Michizane.

A heavenly maiden with a hagoromo (a robe or garment) has also been proclaimed as ancestress of the Kirihata family. In this ancestor myth, the forefather is named Tayu Kirihata, who marries a celestial maiden.

==== Taiwan ====
According to Taiwanese scholars, these tales are classified as types 400, "凡夫尋仙妻" (Mortal Seeks Fairy Wife), and 400A, "鳥妻(仙侶失蹤)" (The Bird Wife (Vanishing Fairy Spouse)). In type 400, the hero marries a supernatural maiden, obtaining wealth from this marriage, and has children with her; the children are ridiculed for their origin, and the fairy spouse leaves. Depending on the tale, the story reaches one of three conclusions: the hero finds his fairy wife; they find each other but cannot be together; or they can meet only once in a while via the Magpie Bridge. In type 400A, the hero steals the feather cloak of a bird maiden, stranding her on the mortal realm while the other maidens fly away; the bird maiden marries the man and gives birth to children, but finds the feather cloak and flies away, only returning later to take her children with her.

=== Northeast Asia ===
The Northeast Asia region (more specifically, Manchuria) also records the tale of the swan maiden, but in the form of the "Heavenly Maiden". In a published tale, the heavenly maiden descends to earth to bathe in a lake, marries a human man, and becomes "the primeval ancestress of the Manchu".

In one version of the origin of the Dörbed, a hunter climbs up Nidu Mountain, where a lake is located. When he approaches the body of water, he sees four "goddesses" playing in the water. He returns home to fetch a net and climbs the mountain again. Lying in wait to spring a trap, he uses the net to capture one of the goddesses while the other escapes back to the heavens. The goddess and the human marry, but later they must part, and she returns to her heavenly realm. Once there, she realizes she is pregnant and descends to earth to give birth to her child, a boy. She sets a cradle for him on the tree branches and a bird to look after the child. Now finished, she flies back to the heavens.

=== Melanesia ===
In a tale from the island of Efate, the "people of the sky" descend to earth to fish during the night, drop their white wings (inlailaita or "thin sails") on the shore, and leave before dawn. One day, a man witnesses their coming and, after they land, hides a pair of wings in the stem of a banana plant. After the sky-people finish their activities, they depart to the skies, except one woman, who was the owner of the pair of wings. She and the man marry and have two boys, Maka Tafaki and Karisi Bum. The human/sky girl relationship turns sour. Later, she regains her wings and returns to the skies. Their tale continues as the brothers reach the sky land years later and visit their grandmother. The tale also serves to explain the introduction of several types of yams among human populations.

In a tale from New Hebrides, a man named Tagaro spies on winged women, named either Banewonowono ("web skin", possibly referring to bat-like wings), or Vinmara ("dove skin"), who descend to bathe in a lake. The man takes the wings of one of them. One day, when gathering yams, Tagaro's brothers scold her, and she cries, her tears washing away the soil that covered the hiding place of her wings. She puts them on and returns to the skies.

In a similar story collected from Maewo Island (Aurora Island), in Vanuatu, titled The Winged Wife, the hero's name is Qat. In this version of the story, the maiden from the sky has "bird-like" wings. After she is stranded on Earth, Qat's mother scolds her, she cries, and finds her hidden pair of wings. She returns to the sky realm, and her husband, Qat, goes after her.

In a tale from New Guinea, originally collected by Jan de Vries and translated into Hungarian with the title A tíz égi asszony ("The Ten Celestial Women"), an old woman lived near a coral reef in Tidore, where ten women from heaven come to bathe. One day, a shipwrecked sailor is rescued by the older woman and told about the ten beautiful women who come to bathe. The man decides to spy on them. He decides to marry the youngest, so he hides her wings before she flies back to the skies (as the older woman advised) and marries her. She bears him two sons. While he is away fishing for his family, the celestial wife finds her stolen pair of wings and returns to the skies. The human asks the bird to help him reach the Sky Realm. There, he has to identify his true wife from a queue of identical sky women, which he does. The man, then, is given an empty bamboo cane, filled with many types of cereal grains, and he must find the barley grains - a task he accomplishes with the use of feathers. At last, he and his wife return to Earth. Their four sons become rajahs of Djilolo, Bahtjan, Ternate, and Tidore.

=== Africa ===
==== Southeast Africa ====
The narrative of the Sky-Maiden was collected in song form from the Ndau people, titled Legend and Song of the Sky-Maiden: the daughter of a powerful chief who lived in the sky and her attendants go down to Earth to bathe, and it becomes a dare amongst the royal princes to see who can fetch her plume/feather – the symbol of her otherwordliness. The victor is a poor man who, as a subversion of the common narrative, gets to live with his sky-wife in her abode. A version of the tale in narrative form was given as The Sky-People (Vasagole) by Franz Boas and C. Kamba Simango in the Journal of American Folk-Lore.

In Tshinyama's Heavenly Maidens, two winged maidens descend from the heavens to an earthly watering hole – an event witnessed by a mortal man.

==== Madagascar ====
In a Malagasy tale, obtained from Vàkin-Ankarãtra (The way in which Adrianòro obtained a wife from Heaven), the hero Adrianoro is informed that three maidens bathe in a lake, and tries to set a snare (trap) for them by shapeshifting into fruits or seeds.

==== East Africa ====
Researcher E. Dora Earthy reported tales from the Lenge people about the "maidens from heaven": they marry mortal men and, depending on the tale, either escape back to Heaven or decide to remain with them.

=== North America ===
In a Yuchi tale, A Hunter Who Captured a Woman from the Sky, collected in 1931, a man was hunting when he saw something descending from the heavens, carrying people with it, some of them pretty women. He captured and married one of the women.

In a Creek tale from Alabama, The Celestial Skiff, recorded in 1929, a group of people descends from the sky in a canoe. At one time, a man manages to capture one woman from that group and has many children with her. Years later, the woman tries to climb onto the canoe to return to the sky.

== The Star Wife or Star Women ==
A third occurrence of the supernatural spouse from above is the Star Woman or, in the words of E. Hartland, "The Star's Daughter". Scholars see a possible relation of this character with the Swan Maiden legend.

=== Native American ===
==== Overview ====
The motif of the Star Maiden can be found in Native American folklore and mythology, as the character of the Star Wife: she usually descends from heaven in a basket along with her sisters to play in a prairie or to bathe in a lake, and a mortal male, entranced by her figure, plans to make her his own. It is later discovered that she is a maiden from the stars or a star herself who came down to Earth.

According to Anthony Wonderley, despite the "very close similarity" between the two tales, ethnologist John Bierhorst calls this North American tale the "Sky Maidens": a group of maidens descends from the heavens in a basket to dance and play ball. Wonderley locates the tale in the Southeast, among the Shawnee, the Pawnee, and possibly among the Iroquois (since the Iroquois tale was written down after 1900).

==== Regional variants ====
In a Sioux legend, the human hunter marries the Star Wife and fathers a son. Mother and child escape to the Star-realm, but begin to miss the human father. Her father suggests they bring him there to reunite the family, and they do so.

In a third variation, an inversion occurs: the hunter is carried in a basket to the Star-country to live with his Star Wife. However, he begins to miss his human mother. So, with the aid of a pair of red swan's wings for him and his wife, they return to the human world.

In a tale attributed to the Wyandot people, seven Star Sisters (the Pleiades) descend to Earth in a basket. One day, a human hunter captures the youngest by her girdle while their sisters escape in the basket. The maiden promises to become the hunter's wife, but before that, he must accompany her to the sky ("the Sun's lodge").

Author Macleod Yearsley provided the summary of a similar Algonquin tale: a hunter sees twelve maidens descend from the sky in a basket. When he tries to approach them, the basket is pulled back to the sky. The next day, the hunter assumes the form of an animal (a mouse) to create a false sense of safety for the sky girls. The basket descends, and the hunter captures one of the maidens. He marries her, and they have a son. Some years into their marriage, the sky maiden weaves a new basket, takes her son with her, and uses the magic song to elevate herself and her son back to her sky realm. The hunter goes after them. In other versions of the same tale, the protagonist is named Waupee, the White Hawk, and the story has been variously sourced: a version titled The Daughters of the Star, from Canada, or from the Ojibwes; The White Hawk, from the Shawnee; The Star-Maiden, from the Chippewa; Waupee White Hawk and His Family, from Ohio.

=== Peru ===
In a Peruvian tale collected by ethnologue John Bierhorst titled The Boy who Rose to the Sky, a youth is sent to guard his family's potato plantation against whoever is stealing their yield. At night, three stars descend from the sky in the form of glowing maidens. The youth captures one of them as the others escape, and makes her his wife. After some time, the star maiden flees from her human husband and returns to her sky realm. Still on Earth, the human husband decides to follow her and convinces a condor to take him there by feeding the bird with two llamas on the way to the heavens. The llama meat is not enough to feed the condor, and the youth slices a bit of his leg to feed his transport on the last part of the journey. He meets his star wife once again, but has to return to Earth after his wife expels him.

=== Philippines ===
Philippine academic E. Arsenio Manuel, among others, stated that the character of the "Star Maiden" is prevalent in Filipino folklore.

In a tale collected from the "Nabaloi" (Ibaloi people, an indigenous ethnic group in the Philippines), The star wives, the stars themselves descend from heaven and bathe in a lake in Batan. The local males hide the stars' clothing, which allows the stars to fly, and marry them. Eventually, the men grow old, but the stars retain their youth, regain their clothing, and return to the skies.

In another tale, collected by Fay-Cooper Cole from the Tinguian (Itneg people in the Philippines), the star maiden Gaygayoma descends from the sky with other stars into a sugar-cane field to eat the produce. The plantation belongs to a human named Aponitolau, who had a mortal wife, Aponibolinayen. One night, he goes to the fields to check on the bamboo fence and sees many stars, "dazzling lights" falling from the sky, and one that "looked like a flame of fire" who left her garment near the fence. The human farmer Aponitolau frightens the many stars, which return to the skies, and sits on the maiden's garment. She introduces herself as the daughter of Bagbagak and Sinag, two celestial beings, and reveals she wishes to take him as her husband.

In a tale collected from the Bontoc Igorot titled The Stars, the stars descend to eat a sugar-cane plantation belonging to a human farmer. The human captures the star maiden and marries her. After bearing him five sons, she spends her time sewing her wings back on to wear them and return to the sky.

In a tale collected from a Bontok woman from Tukukan village and published with the title Tokfefe, the Star Wife, some stars descend to bathe in a terrestrial lake; a man steals the wings of one of them and marries her; she later discovers the hiding place of her wings (her husband's granary shed), retrieves them and flies back to the sky.

In a tale from the Ifialig of Barlig, titled Siblaw Taraw ("The Star Maiden"), a bachelor climbs up a mountain to reach the enchanted lake of Siblaw. That night, he sees some celestial maidens coming down from the heavens to bathe in the water, after they take off their garments and wings. The next night, the human hides one of their wings and strands her on Earth, while her companions return to the skies. He marries the star girl, now named Taraw ('Star'), and she bears a little girl. One day, when her daughter is 15 years old, Taraw finds her lost wings and, saying goodbye to her daughter, departs back to the skies.

== Other supernatural women ==
=== Europe ===
==== Balkans: Vilas and Samovilas ====
Similar characters to the Swan Maiden are attested in Greek and Balkanic traditions. These figures are known in South Slavic areas (namely, Slovenian, Slovak, Serbian and Croatian) as víla, in Bulgarian as samodiva and in Macedonian as samovila - all of them described as beautiful, otherworldly maidens who dance in groups in the forests. In South Slavic folklore, these female beings can be forced to marry mortal men if they can secure a maiden's clothes, wings, or accessories, which grants their magical powers. After the marriage, the fairy maiden either regains or discovers the stolen belonging, wears it, and departs, leaving her human family behind.

Romanian folklorist Marcu Beza noted that a story about a shepherd stealing a fairy maiden's clothes, marrying her, and she later asking for them back "spread all over the Balkans", barring minor differences: the shepherd is described as a skilled flute player, and a kerchief, a veil, or a scarf replaces the garments.

Commenting on a South Slavic tale collected by Friedrich Salomo Krauss, Walter Puchner noted the motif of the theft of the Vila (Neraida, in Greece)'s clothes occurred all over the Balkans.

Scholarship draws attention to the fact that the Balkanic vilas are associated with the colour white, either in her clothes or in her physical appearance. Likewise, British classicist H. J. Rose compared the Vila, who wears white garments, to the Greek neraidas: they are described as ἁσπροφὀραις ("bearing white clothes"), an inversion of the usual naked depiction of the Greek nymphs of old.

Scholars on the cultural history of the Balkan region have argued that these fairy- or nymph-like characters (Vilas, Samovilas, Samodivas, and Nereids) "in many respects" mirror similar figures of Graeco-Thracian origin, and possibly originate from the belief in female nature spirits. (Note: Éva Pócs treats them as remnants of ancient fairy cults of Southern Europe.)

===== Bulgaria =====
The counterpart to the Swan Maiden in the Bulgarian tale corpus is the Samodiva, an ambivalent (both helpful and malevolent) ethereal maiden of great beauty who appears in mountains and forests near watercourses. Humans can steal their robes or wings to entrap them in the mortal realm. As such, the international type ATU 400, "The Man on a Quest for the Lost Wife", is known in the Bulgarian Folktale Catalogue, organized by Liliana Daskalova, as "Самодива-Невяста" ("The Samodiva Bride").

In a Bulgarian folk song, The Samodiva married against her will, three girls, not related to each other, doff their magical garments to bathe, but are seen by a shepherd who takes their clothing. Each girl tried separately to plead and convince the youth to return the clothing. He does so – but only to the first two; the third maiden he chose to wed after she revealed she was an only child. After the wedding, the village insists that she dance for everyone's amusement, but the samodiva says she cannot dance without her garment. Once her husband delivers her the clothing, she flies away.

===== North Macedonia =====
Romanian author Marcu Beza reported a version of the tale "among the Vlach" of (then) Macedonia. In this story, a shepherd named Gógu plays his pipe as a gathering of nymphs or fairies appears to dance to the song near a pool or a fountain. The ethereal maidens either take off their rings, counting them one by one, or their garments. In the version with the garments, the shepherd steals the maiden's garments and forces her to marry him. Some time after the wedding, during a celebration in the village, the maiden asks for her raiment back. She puts it on and vanishes back to the skies. He also stated that this version is parallel to a Romanian tale titled Ion Buzdugan, collected by fellow folklorist I. C. Fundescu.

In another Macedonian tale, The Shepherd and the Three Vilas (Ovčar i tri vile), a poor shepherd takes his sheep to graze in the woods and spies on three maidens bathing. For three days, he spies, and on the third day, he steals their garments to convince one of them to marry him. The maidens reveal they are vilas, magical spirits of great power, and it will do him no good to marry one. Still, he insists on marrying one of them and chooses the youngest. The young vila's sisters regain their garments and fly away, leaving the other maiden to her fate. She marries the young shepherd. One year later, during a celebration in the village, the local women invite the vila to dance with them the kolo. Since vila can only dance with their complete outfits, the vila wife asks his husband for it back. After the dance, the vila wife begins to ascend to the skies, but begs her husband to search for her in the village of Kuškundaljevo. This tale was previously published by linguist August Leskien in German with the title Der Hirt und die drei Samovilen ("The Shepherd and the three Samovilas"), and sourced as from Bulgaria. Regarding the location "Kuškundaleo", Leskien supposed the name was of Turkish origin, but his colleague, Professor Stumme, presumed that the name was a compound term in Slavic, meaning "The Bird Catcher Village".

===== Romania =====
I. C. Fundescu collected a Romanian variant titled Ion Buzduganu: youth Ion works as a goatherd and walks into the forest one day. There, he sees three maidens bathing in a pool of crystalline water. He steals the garments of the first two maidens, who beg him to give them back. He gets the clothes of the third and youngest and makes her his wife. During a celebration in the village, the maiden asks for her garments back so that the people can see her dance. When she puts it on, she tells her husband Ion that he must seek her out, then disappears. Ion, now, has to go on a quest to win her back.

===== Eastern Europe =====
In The Youth and the Vila, the youngest son, who is considered a fool by his two elder brothers, manages to pluck the golden hairs of a vila who has been eating the silver pears of his father's garden. In a second tale, The Vila in the Golden Castle, a father asks his three sons to guard his flower garden at night, because swans have been eating the flowers (in reality, the vilas were). The youth plucks the hairs of one of the vilas, and she lives with him for a week before she departs to the Golden Castle. The youth goes after her and, after reaching the Golden Castle, has to work for her old Vila mother before he marries her daughter. The tale ends with the youth and the vila escaping from the old Vila by throwing a magical object behind them (a comb that becomes a river).

==== Ukraine: Povitrulya ====
In a Ukrainian tale collected by folklorist Petro Lintur from Khust with the title "Жена-поветруля" (Ukrainian: "Жона-повітруля"; English: "The Povetrulya Wife"), a minister's son named Joseph likes to hunt in the forest, and is pretty good at it. One night, he gets lost in the dark forest. He wanders off for a long time until he reaches a lake where twelve povitrulyas are bathing, their clothes strewn on the shore. The hunter hides the clothing of one of them. When they come out of the lake, eleven povitrulyas grab their clothes and fly off, leaving their twelfth member at the human's mercy. Joseph makes his way through the forest until he goes back to his father's house, the povitrulya just behind him. Joseph enters the house, locks the maiden's garments in a chest, and then takes the key himself. He marries the povitrulya and they have a son. Five years pass. One day, he leaves the key at home and goes with his parents to church. When he comes back, neither his wife nor his son is in the house. He goes to check on the chest and sees it open, the garments nowhere to be seen. He then begins a quest for his wife: with the guidance of three wolves, he reaches two huts, one where his mother-in-law lives with the eleven povitrulyas, and another where his wife is. Joseph knocks on the older woman's hut, who angrily berates him and sets him tests: first, he is to identify his true wife from a parade of povitrulyas; next, he is to build a spinning house on duck feet and legs for his mother-in-law, with a crystal bridge connecting the house to her old hut. After he fulfills the tasks, his povitrulya wife tells him they will escape that night with their son. She uses a magic ring to undo the house and the bridge and flees with her human husband in a Magical Flight sequence: he turns into a lake, she into a goose, and their son into a gosling. Her mother comes to the lake to try to trick her daughter and grandson, but the povitrulya remains steadfast, and the older woman flies back home. Soon after, they change back, and Joseph leaves his wife and son on the outskirts of the village, while he goes to gather the people. The man, however, forgets his povitrulya wife and, sometime later, is set to be married to another woman. The povitrulya maiden manages to go to the wedding and recalls his memory.

In a Transcarpathian Ukrainian tale titled "Сопілкар Марко і повітруля" ("Piper Marko and the Povitrulya"), Marko is a poor widow's son. He earns his living grazing the local herds. One day, when he was young, he took the herd to graze in the forest and began to play his pipe. An older man appears before him, and soon after, twelve maidens (povitrulyas) come to dance. The older man tells Marko he can make one of the girls his wife if he takes one of the girls' clothes, but, once they take off their clothes after the dance, they become invisible, so Marko must choose the one he fancies the most. The next day, Marko follows the older man's advice: he hides the clothes of one of the povitrulyas, while the others fly away. He then takes the maiden to his mother's house, where he hides her garments under a pile of firewood, marries her, and they have a son. One day, Marko goes on a hunt and leaves his povitrulya wife under his mother's care. After he leaves, the povitrulya freshens herself before her mother-in-law. The old widow admires her beauty, and the povitrulya, cunningly, tells her that she will look even more beautiful with her garments. Marko's mother finds and returns her garments; the povitrulya puts it, grabs her son, tells her mother-in-law to let Marko follow her to the Glass Mountain, and vanishes. Marko returns from the hunt and learns of his wife's disappearance, so he takes his wife's artisanal eggs with him and begins a quest. However, he does not know where the Glass Mountain lies, so he plays his pipe, and the same older man appears to him. Marko explains his dilemma, and the older man gives him a pair of boots and a cap of invisibility. He uses it to reach the Glass Mountain and meets his son just outside his mother's hut. He gives his son the eggs as proof of his presence, and the povitrulya maiden welcomes him. However, the povitrulya's mother appears before him and orders him to perform some tasks: to circle the hut three times with her spindle and not let it burn, and to build her a twelve-storey palace overnight. The povitrulya maiden gives Marko her ring, which he uses to accomplish both tasks. Sometime later, the povitrulya tells Marko they will escape; Marko lets them fly ahead of him while he uses the magic boots to return home.

In another Transcarpathian Ukrainian tale titled "Йосиф-забудько" ("Iosif-Zabudko"), a minister has a son named Iosif who is so forgetful. One day, he asks his father to be allowed to hunt some game in the woods, and his father sends a person to chaperone him. However, Iosif gets lost in the woods, and his father thinks he disappeared. The youth wanders deep into the forest and finds twelve povitrulyas swimming in a lake, their clothes strewn about on the shore. Iosif steals the garments of one of them; eleven of the maidens rush for their clothes and fly away, save for their companion, who remains with the human youth. Iosif goes back home with the garments and locks them in a chest; the povitrulya marries him, giving birth to a son three years later. One day, he goes fishing, but forgets to lock the chest; the povitrulya puts back her garments and flies away. Iosif returns and, not seeing his wife, decides to search for her. He meets three wolf brothers from a wolf pack, and the third wolf carries him to a mountain with a house atop it. Outside the house, he sees his son and asks him where the mother is. The little boy says the povitrulyas live in the house and goes inside when an older woman appears. The older woman says Iosif has to identify his wife among the povitrulyas, otherwise, he will lose his head. His povitrulya wife advises Iosif and passes the test. Next, the older woman orders him to build a larger house for her and a bridge. Again, Iosif is helped by his wife, who gives him a magic ring with a bug encrusted on it to fulfil the task. The older woman is satisfied with the results and lives in her new house. Sometime later, the povitrulya wife convinces Iosif to take their son and run back to his homeland, and make the large house crumble by fiddling with the ring. The trio escapes, and the older woman chases after them, but they shapeshift into objects to trick her: Iosif becomes a fisherman, their son a bush, and she a goose. The older woman tries to draw the goose to her by giving her a magic egg, but the goose hides the egg under her wings, and her mother relents. Later, Iosif asks his family to stay in the forest for a while, because he will come back with an entourage, but the povitrulya says he will forget them as soon as he takes three steps back into his house. It happens as she described: Iosif forgets about his wife and is set to marry a local girl. The povitrulya learns of this and cracks a nut to produce a dress. She dances in front of the second bride, who becomes so impressed that she wants to buy her dress. The povitrulya agrees to trade it for a night with Iosif. She cannot make him remember, and the wedding proceeds as planned. As a last resort, she cracks open the egg her mother threw at her and finds a golden dress. She crashes the wedding in a golden dress and dances with Iosif, asking him if he can remarry, even though he already has a family. Iosif finally recognizes the povitrulya as his wife and goes back to her.

=== Middle East and Caucasus: The Peri ===
Western writers have noted that the character of the Peri (or Pari) in Persian and Islamic mythology, as a supernatural wife, shares traits with the swan maiden: the human male hides the Pari's wings and marries her. After some time, the Pari woman regains her wings and leaves her mortal husband. Scholar Ulrich Marzolph (fa) indicates an Indo-Persian origin for the character, who was later integrated into the Arab fairy tale tradition. The peri appears in Asia Minor, Central Asia, and was brought by the Turkic expansion to the Balkans, specifically to Bulgaria and (then) Macedonia.

According to Turkologist Ignác Kúnos, the peris in Turkish tales fly through the air with their cloud-like garments of a green colour, but also in the shape of doves. They also number forty, seven or three, and serve a Peri-king, who can be a human person they stole from the human realm. Like vestals, Kúnos wrote, the peris belong to the spiritual realm until love sprouts in their hearts, and they must join with their mortal lovers, being abandoned by their sisters to their own devices. Also, the first meeting between humans and peris occurs during the latter's bathtime.

==== Armenia ====
In the Armenian folktale Kush-Pari or The Bird-Peri, a prince seeks the titular Kush-Pari, a Houri-Pari or "Fairy-Bird" ("a nymph of paradise in the shape of a bird", "a golden human-headed bird ... radiant as the sun"), as a present to the king he serves. After being captured, the Kush-Pari reveals to the king that she transforms into a maiden after undonning her feather cloak and proposes that she become his queen after his servant rescues her maid and brings back the fiery mares. Kush-Pari intends to use the fiery mares' milk for a special ritual: the king dies, but the prince survives and marries her. At the end of the story, her new husband tells his wife that his father is blind, but she reveals she was the cause of his blindness. Author Leon Surmelian noted that this Houri-Pari was a "fiery creature", a maiden of great beauty.

==== Iran ====
In a Persian story, The Merchant's Son and the Peries, the peris of lore take off their garments and assume human form to bathe in the water, until a young man steals their clothes and forces one of them to be his wife. The peris try to convince him not to, as they are "creatures of fire" and he, a human, is "made of water and clay".

In the tale Prince Yousef of the Fairies and King Ahmad or its Russian translation by professor Mahomed-Nuri Osmanovich Osmanov, "Юсуф — шах пери и Малек-Ахмад" ("Yusuf, the Shah of the Peris and Malek-Ahmad"), a prince named Malek-Ahmad marries his sisters to three animals (a lion, a wolf, and an eagle), and leaves home. He takes shelter with a Div-family. The Div-matriarch gives Malek-Ahmad a set of keys and forbids him from opening two doors. He does anyway: behind the first door, he releases a prisoner named Yusuf, the Shah of the Peris, who flies back to Mount Qaf; behind the second, he finds a garden where three doves become maidens by taking off their clothes. Malek-Ahmad hides the clothing of the youngest dove-maiden (identified as a "Peri" in the story) while her sisters depart. Malek-Ahmad marries the dove-maiden, and she bears two sons. Some time later, they reach a village where he celebrates his wedding with the peri. However, his peri-wife notices that some luti intend to kill him and his sons and kidnap her, so she convinces him to return her belongings. The peri-wife puts on the garments, begs her husband to find her on Mount Qaf, and flies away with her children. After a long journey, he reaches Mount Qaf, where he finds his peri wife, his sons, and her brother Yusuf, the Shah of the Peris.

== Popular culture ==
=== Literature ===
Russian Romantic writer Vasily Zhukovsky developed the theme of the bird maiden in his poem "Сказка о царе Берендее" ("The Tale of Tsar Berendey"), published in 1833. The tale tells the epic story of the mythical Tsar Berendey, who is forced to promise his son, Ivan Tsarevich, to the evil sorcerer Koschei. Years later, Ivan Tsarevich reaches the shores of a lake and sees thirty grey ducks diving. In fact, they are the daughters of Koschei, and one of them is Marya Tsarevna.

Victorian novelist and translator William Morris wrote his poetic ouvre The Earthly Paradise, in which there is a narration by a bard of the romance between a human and a swan maiden, comprising an episode of the poem The Land East of the Sun and West of the Moon.

Pop culture appearances include modern novels of the fantasy genre such as Three Hearts and Three Lions and the "swanmanes" in the Anita Blake series (such as Kaspar Gunderson). They are also called swan mays or swanmays in fantasy fiction and Dungeons & Dragons. In the Mercedes Lackey book Fortune's Fool, one swan maiden (named Yulya) from a flock of six is kidnapped by a Jinn.

=== Film and animation ===
The animal bride theme is explored in an animated film called The Red Turtle (2016).

Princess Pari Banu from the 1926 German silhouette animation film The Adventures of Prince Achmed appears very similar to a swan maiden, having a peacock skin that transforms her and her handmaids. However, she is referred to as a fairy or genie in the original 1001 Nights.

An episode of children's television programming, Super Why!, adapted the tale of the Swan Maiden.

Inuyasha the Movie: The Castle Beyond the Looking Glass features the celestial robe/hagoromo coveted by a beautiful woman who claims to be an immortal heavenly being named Kaguya, who is based on the Princess of the Moon in The Tale of the Bamboo Cutter.

=== Comics ===
The manga series Ceres, Celestial Legend (Ayashi no Ceres) by Yu Watase is a story about an angel whose magic source is stolen while she bathes, and she becomes the wife of the man who stole it. The story follows one of her descendants, sixteen-year-old Aya Mikage, who is now carrying the angel's vengeful spirit reborn within her. The Progenitor of the Mikage family and Ceres' human husband, and the one who had stolen and hidden her celestial robe (hagoromo), thus stranding her on Earth, has been reborn within Aki Mikage, Aya's twin brother.

The manhwa Faeries' Landing translates the Korean folktale of The Fairy and the Woodcutter to a modern setting.

=== Video games ===
The theme is also explored in the modern fantasy video game Heroine's Quest.

The eleventh installment of the hidden object game series Dark Parables (The Swan Princess and the Dire Tree), published by Eipix, mixes the motif of the swan maidens and the medieval tale of The Knight of the Swan. The sixteenth installment, Portrait of the Stained Princess, introduces the Knight of Swan himself, enchanted to never reveal his true name to his beloved.

In the video game LOOM by Lucasfilm, the main character belongs to a tribe of spellcrafters (the weavers) able to switch between human and swan form. The spell to become a swan is achieved later in the game.

== See also ==
- Selkie (Seal maidens)
- Prince as bird (the bird is a prince and woos the maiden)
- Jorinde and Joringel (the maiden is transformed into a bird by the witch)
- The Love for Three Oranges (fairy tale) (the love interest is turned into a bird by the false bride)
- The Nine Peahens and the Golden Apples
- The White Duck (a witch curses the queen into a duck form)
- The Raven (Brothers Grimm) (a princess changed into a raven)
- Melusine (a mermaid wife)
- Undine (a mermaid wife)
- Knight of the Swan (alternatively named Helias or Lohengrin)
- Go I Know Not Whither and Fetch I Know Not What
- Manohara, a Kinnari who falls in love with Prince Sudhana
- Tennin
- The Heavenly Maiden and the Woodcutter

== Bibliography ==
- Armstrong, E. A. (1959). The folklore of birds: an enquiry into the origin & distribution of some magico-religious traditions. Boston: Houghton Mifflin.
- Bäcker, Jörg (2012). "Schwanjungfrau". In Brednich, Rudolf Wilhelm; Bausinger, Hermann; Brückner, Wolfgang [in German]; Drascek, Daniel [in German]; Gerndt, Helge [in German]; Köhler-Zülch, Ines; Roth, Klaus [in German] (eds.). Enzyklopädie des Märchens. Walter de Gruyter. pp. 312a–318b. ISBN 9783110921717.
- Baughman, Ernest W. (2012). Type and Motif-Index of the Folktales of England and North America. De Gruyter Mouton. p. 10. doi:10.1515/9783111402772. hdl:2027/inu.30000041100821. ISBN 978-3-11-140277-2.
- Baring-Gould, Sabine. Curious myths of the Middle Ages. London: Rivingtons. 1876. pp. 561–578.
- Bihet, Francesca (31 January 2019). "The Swan-Maiden in Late-Victorian Folkloristics". Fairy Investigation Society Journal: 24–29.
- Berezkin, Yuri [in Russian] (2010). "Sky-Maiden and World Mythology". Iris. 31 (31): 27–39. doi:10.35562/iris.2020.
- Boggs, Ralph Steele. Index of Spanish folktales, classified according to Antti Aarne's "Types of the folktale". Chicago: University of Chicago. 1930. pp. 52–53.
- Booss, C. Scandinavian Folk & Fairy Tales: Tales from Norway, Sweden, Denmark, Finland & Iceland. New York: Crown, 1984.
- Bolte, Johannes; Polívka, Jiří (2014) [1918]. "193. Der Trommler". Anmerkungen zu den Kinder- und Hausmärchen der Brüder Grimm (in German). Vol. 4. Dieterich. pp. 406–417 (416). ISBN 9783846013885.
- de Charencey, Comte H. "Le Folklore dans les Deux Mondes". In: Actes de la Societé Philologique Tome XXIII. Anées 1893 & 1894. Paris: Librarie C Klincksieck. pp. 308–331.
- Clouston, W. A. Popular tales and fictions: their migrations and transformations. Edinburgh; London: W. Blackwood. 1887. pp. 182–191.
- Cosquin, Emmanuel. Contes populaires de Lorraine comparés avec les contes des autres provinces de France et des pays étrangers, et précédés d'un essai sur l'origine et la propagation des contes populaires européens. Deuxième Tirage. Tome II. Paris: Vieweg. 1887. pp. 16–23.
- Cosquin, Emmanuel (1878). "Contes populaires lorrains recueillis dans un village du Barrois à Montiers-sur-Saulx (Meuse) (Suite)". Romania. 7 (28): 527–592. doi:10.3406/roma.1878.6428.
- Dixon, Roland B. The Mythology Of All Races Vol. IX – Oceanic. Boston, MA: Marshall Jones Company. 1916. pp. 63–63, 138–139, 206, 294–295, and 302.
- Grundtvig, Svend. Danske folkeæventyr, fundne i folkemunde og gjenfortalte. Kjøbenhavn: C.A. Reitzel, 1878. pp. 19–33 ("Jomfru Lene af Sondervand").
- Hahn, Johann Georg von. Griechische und Albanesische Märchen 1–2. München/Berlin: Georg Müller. 1918 [1864]. pp. 336–340.
- Hatto, A. T. (1961). "The Swan Maiden: A Folk-Tale of North Eurasian Origin?". Bulletin of the School of Oriental and African Studies, University of London. 24 (2): 326–352. doi:10.1017/S0041977X00091461. ISSN 0041-977X. JSTOR 610171.
- Jacobs, Joseph. European Folk and Fairy Tales. New York, London: G. P. Putnam's Sons. 1916. pp. 240–242.
- Jones, W. Henry; Kropf, Lajos L.; Kriza, János. The folk-tales of the Magyars. London: Pub. for the Folk-lore society by E. Stock. 1889. pp. 362–373
- Kimishima, Hisako [in Japanese] (March 1969). "Hagoromo oboegaki: hishō to henshin" 羽衣覚書: 飛翔と変身 [A note on Hagoromo] (PDF). The geibun-kenkyu: journal of arts and letters. 27. Keiou University: 411–421.
- Meier, Ernst. Deutsche Volksmärchen aus Schwaben. Stuttgart. 1852. pp. 38–42 (Von drei Schwänen).
- Miller, Alan L. (1987a). "The Swan-Maiden Revisited: Religious Significance of 'Divine-Wife' Folktales with Special Reference to Japan". Asian Folklore Studies. 46 (1): 55–86. doi:10.2307/1177885. JSTOR 1177885.
- Pino-Saavedra, Yolando. Cuentos Folklóricos De Chile. Tomo I. Santiago, Chile: Editorial Universitaria. 1960. pp. 390–392 (notes on Tale nr. 35).
- Sax, B. The Serpent and the Swan: The Animal Bride in Folklore and Literature. Blacksburg, VA: McDonald & Woodward, 1998.
- Sri Wulan Rujiati Mulyani. "The Bathing Beauties in Indonesian Stories: A Preliminary Research". In: Untuk Bapak Guru. Persembahan para murid untuk memperingati usia genap 80 tahun Prof. Dr. A. J. Bernet Kempers. Jakarta: Proyek Penelitian Purbakala Jakarta, Departemen Pendidikan dan Kebudayaan, 1986. pp. 241–257.
- Toshiharu, Yoshikawa (August 1984). A Comparative Study of the Thai, Sanskrit, and Chinese Swan Maiden. International Conference on Thai Studies. pp. 197–213.
- Thompson, Stith (1977). The Folktale. University of California Press. pp. 88–93. ISBN 978-0520035379.
- Village Folk-Tales of Ceylon. Collected and translated by H. Parker. Vol. II. London: Luzac & Co. 1914. pp. 353–354.
- Waley, Arthur (1 January 1959). "An Early Chinese Swan-Maiden Story". Journal of the Warburg and Courtauld Institutes. 22 (1–2): 1–5. doi:10.2307/750555. JSTOR 750555. S2CID 195021062.
- Wiley, Roland John (1991). Tchaikovsky's Ballets.
- Zheleznova, Irina. Tales of the Amber Sea: Fairy Tales of the Peoples Of Estonia, Latvia, and Lithuania. Moscow: Progress Publishers. 1981 (1974). pp. 174–178.
- [Anonymous]. Il Nuovi goliardi. Periodico mensile di storia-letteratura-arte. Volume 1, Fascicolo 1. Luglio 1881. Milano: Tipografia P. B. Bellini e C. 1881. pp. 228–243.
