= 6th Macau International Movie Festival =

2014 Chinese film awards ceremony

The 6th Macau International Movie Festival ceremony (simplified Chinese: 第六届澳门国际电影节; traditional Chinese: 第六屆澳門國際電影 節), organized by the Macau Film and Television Media Association and China International Cultural Communication Center, took place on November 30, 2014, in Macau.

Coming Home won a record-tying four awards including Best Picture, Best Writing, Best Newcomer and Best Cinematography. Sara won two awards including Best Actor and Best Actress.

== Winners and nominees ==
Best Picture: Coming Home – Zhang Yimou; But Always – Snow Zou; That Demon Within – Dante Lam; Beijing Love Story'' – Chen Sicheng; Kung Fu Jungle – Teddy Chan	Best Director: Chung Shu-Kai – Golden Brother; Isao Yukisada – Five Minutes to Tomorrow; Dante Lam – That Demon Within; Chen Sicheng – Beijing Love Story; Teddy Chan – Kung Fu Jungle
Best Actor: Simon Yam – Sara; Daniel Wu – That Demon Within; Chen Daoming – Coming Home; Donnie Yen – Kung Fu Jungle; Bosco Wong – Golden Brother	Best Actress: Charlene Choi – Sara; Gong Li – Coming Home; Gao Yuanyuan – But Always; Liu Shishi – Five Minutes to Tomorrow; Tong Liya – Beijing Love Story
Best Supporting Actor: None – None; Wang Baoqiang – Kung Fu Jungle; Andy On – That Demon Within; William Chan – Golden Brother; Du Haitao – But Always; Wang Xuebing – Beijing Love Story	Best Supporting Actress: Feng Bo – Black Mirror; Yu Nan – Beijing Love Story; Song Ji-hyo – 708090; Ding Jiali – Coming Home; Michelle Bai – Kung Fu Jungle
Best Writing: Coming Home – Zou Jingzhi; Beijing Love Story – Chen Sicheng; A Person's Love – He Lan; Feeling the Love Flute – Jiang Ping; 708090 – Barbara Wong	Best Cinematography: Coming Home – Zhao Xiaoding; Kung Fu Jungle – Wong Wing-Hung; Beijing Love Story – Song Xiaofei; Black Mirror – Zhang Nan; That Demon Within – Kenny TSE Chung-to
Best Newcomer: Zhang Huiwen – Coming Home	Outstanding Film Award: 腊月的春 Vision of Layue
Outstanding Children's Film Award: Feeling the Love Flute	Chinese Director Outstanding Contribution Award: Zhang Yimou
Chinese Film Performance Outstanding Achievement Award: Ray Lui	Film Industry Development Contribution Award: Yu Dong
Action Performance Outstanding Achievement Award: Jean-Claude Van Damme	Best Non-Profit Film: As I Walked Out One Evening
Outstanding Producer Award: Xiang Cun Ju Le Bu; A Person's Romance; 708090; Target Locked

== Extra Awards ==
- Outstanding Film Award (优秀影片大奖)
- Outstanding Children's Film Award (优秀儿童影片大奖)
- Chinese Director Outstanding Contribution Award (华语导演杰出贡献奖)
- Chinese Film Performance Outstanding Achievement Award (华语影视表演杰出成就奖)
- Film Industry Development Contribution Award (电影产业发展贡献奖)
- Action Performance Outstanding Achievement Award (动作表演杰出成就奖)
- Best Non-Profit Film (最佳公益影片大奖)
- Outstanding Producer Award (优秀制片人大奖)
