= Liu Shishi =

Chinese actress (born 1987)

- 刘诗诗
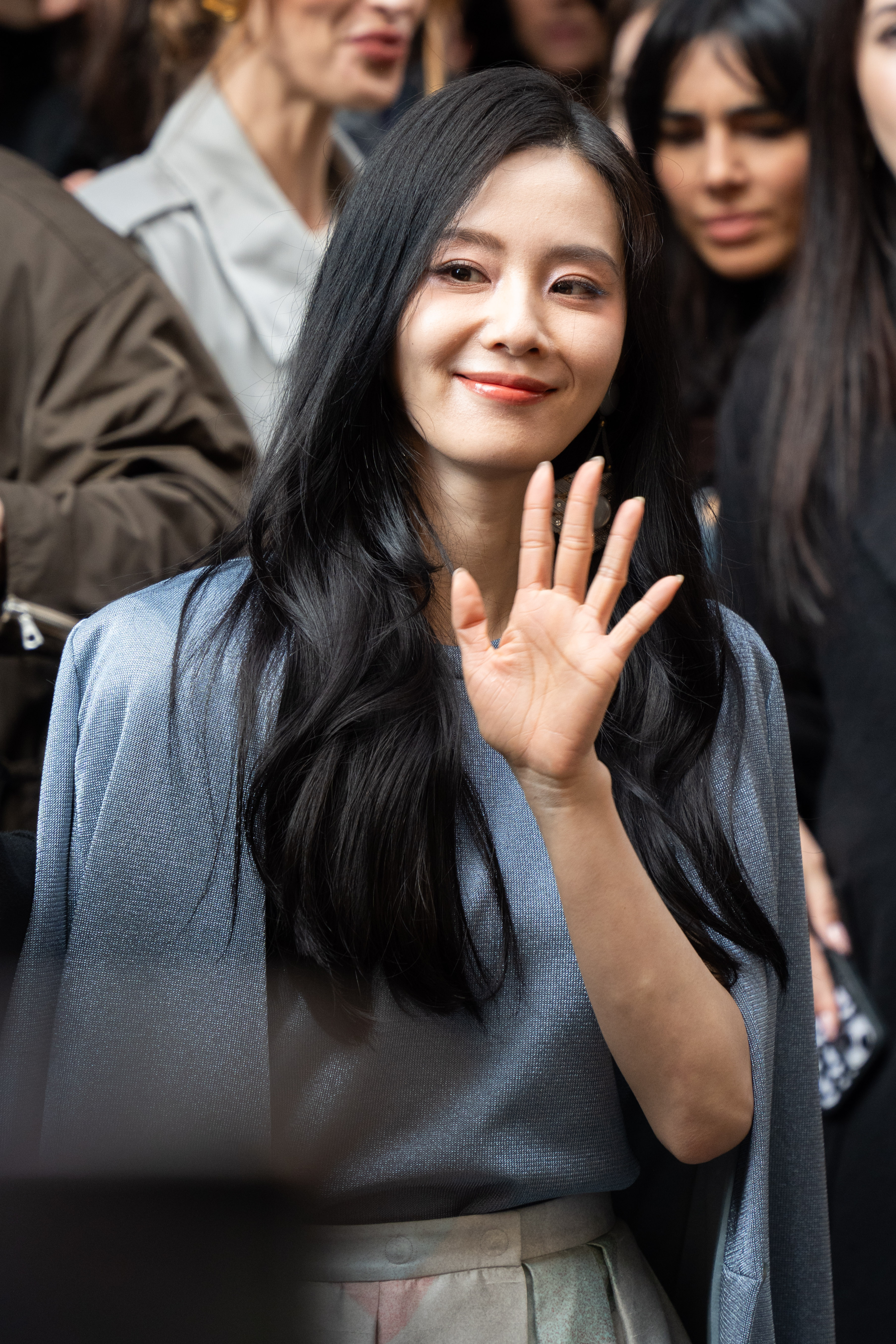
- Liu in 2024
- Born: 10 March 1987 (age 39); Beijing, China
- Other name: Cecilia Liu
- Education: Beijing Dance Academy
- Occupation: Actress
- Years active: 2004–present
- Spouse: Nicky Wu (m. 2015)
- Children: 1

Chinese name
- Simplified Chinese: 刘诗诗
- Traditional Chinese: 劉詩詩
Transcriptions
Standard Mandarin
- Hanyu Pinyin: Liú Shīshī
Yue: Cantonese
- Jyutping: Lau^{4} Si^{1} Si^{1}

Birth name
- Simplified Chinese: 刘诗施
- Traditional Chinese: 劉詩施
Transcriptions
Standard Mandarin
- Hanyu Pinyin: Liú Shīshī

Liu Shishi (Chinese: 刘诗诗; pinyin: Liú Shīshī; born 10 March 1987), also known as Cecilia Liu, is a Chinese actress best known for portraying Long Kui in the fantasy action drama Chinese Paladin 3 (2009) and Ruoxi in the Chinese time-travel drama Scarlet Heart (2011). Her other notable works include The Legend of the Condor Heroes (2008), The Imperial Doctress (2016), and A Journey to Love (2023).

== Career ==
=== 2005–2010: Beginnings and rising popularity ===
Professionally trained in ballet at the Beijing Dance Academy, Liu Shishi made her acting debut in a leading role in the television drama series The Moon and the Wind (2005), which included a specially designed segment of Swan Lake. She then starred in wuxia drama The Young Warriors (2006) and shenmo television series The Fairies of Liaozhai (2007).

In 2007, Liu graduated from the Beijing Dance Academy and was signed on by Tangren Media. She gained recognition for her roles as Mu Nianci in the wuxia drama The Legend of the Condor Heroes (2008) and as Long Kui in the fantasy action drama Chinese Paladin 3 (2009). In 2010, Liu starred in the historical drama A Weaver on the Horizon, based on the life story of Huang Daopo.

=== 2011–2012: Breakthrough and venture into films ===
In 2011, Liu starred alongside Wallace Huo in period action drama The Vigilantes In Masks, which received positive reviews. She then played the female protagonist, Ruoxi, in the time travel historical romance series, Scarlet Heart, based on the novel Bu Bu Jing Xin by Tong Hua. Scarlet Heart became a megahit in China and beyond. Liu bagged several awards at local award-giving bodies for her performance, including Most Popular Actress awards at the China TV Drama Awards and Shanghai Television Festival. The drama has since been adapted into Korean and Thai versions.

Liu followed her TV success with several big screen roles. She made her feature film debut in The Next Miracle (2012), directed by Taiwanese filmmaker Zhuo Li. She also filmed two other movies, Sad Fairy Tale and A Moment of Love.

In 2012, Liu starred in action drama Xuan-Yuan Sword: Scar of Sky, adapted from the video game of the same name. The series topped TV ratings and garnered 2 billion views online. Liu's soaring popularity due to Scarlet Heart in 2011 coupled with Xuan-Yuan Sword: Scar of Sky in 2012 allowed her to become the "Golden Eagle Goddess" at the 9th China Golden Eagle TV Art Festival. She was also chosen by Southern Metropolis Daily as one of the new Four Dan Actresses alongside Angelababy, Yang Mi and Ni Ni.

=== 2013–present: Mainstream popularity ===
In 2013, Liu starred in action comedy Badges of Fury alongside Jet Li. She then starred in wuxia film Brotherhood of Blades, alongside Taiwanese actor Chang Chen, for which Liu was nominated for Best Actress at the China Film Directors' Guild Awards.

In 2014, Liu starred in the historical romance drama Sound of the Desert, based on the novel Ballad of the Desert written by Tong Hua. The series topped television and web ratings domestically, and was also well-received overseas. Liu then starred in romance film Five Minutes to Tomorrow playing dual roles. She and co-stars Haruma Miura and Joseph Chang attended the 19th Busan International Film Festival for the premiere of the film, where she received the Asia Star Award.

In 2016, Liu headlined the historical drama The Imperial Doctress, based on the life of Tan Yunxian, a female physician during China's Ming Dynasty. The drama topped television ratings its run and received positive reviews, and Liu won the Most Influential Actress award at 1st China Television Drama Quality Ceremony for her performance. In 2017, Liu starred along actors Wang Qianyuan and Cao Bingkun in the spy drama The Battle at Dawn. The year also saw her long-overdue romance drama Angelo, which was shot in 2011, air. In it, she played a young single mother opposite Ming Dao. Liu then starred in historical fantasy drama Lost Love in Times alongside William Chan, as well as the crime suspense film The Liquidator where she played a palaeoichnology expert.

In 2019, Liu starred in the romance melodrama If I Can Love You So alongside Tong Dawei. The series has previously completed filming in 2016. The same year, she announced her comeback after two years with the female-centric modern drama To Dear Myself.

== Personal life ==
Liu's grandfather, Liu Tianli, was a performance artist of Xihe Dagu ballad. Both of Liu's parents had been factory workers. Liu's mother retired early for health reasons, while her father later became a businessman.

Liu married her Scarlet Heart co-star Nicky Wu on January 20, 2015 and their wedding ceremony was held in Bali, Indonesia on March 20, 2016. On April 27, 2019, Liu gave birth to a son, nicknamed BuBu after Scarlet Heart (Bubu Jingxin).

== Filmography ==
=== Film ===
Year	Title	Role	Notes	Ref.
2006	The Legend of Lu Xiaofeng	Sun Xiuqing	Television film	
2012	The Next Miracle	Li Jiayi		
2012	Sad Fairy Tale	Yang Jia		
2013	Badges of Fury	Liu Jingshui		
2013	A Moment of Love	Ji Yaqing		
2014	Brotherhood of Blades	Zhou Miaotong		
2014	Five Minutes to Tomorrow	Ruo Lan / Ru Mei		
2017	The Liquidator	Mi Nan		
2021	1921	Soong Ching-ling	Cameo	
2026	Scare Out	Xiao Yu		

Short film

Year	Title	Role	Ref.
2009	Dream Zhu Xian	Liu Xiaoxiao / Mo Li / Zhen'er	
2011	Dream Back to Mount Deer	Suo Feiya	
2012	Coincidence	Yao Bingbing	
2013	Dreamers	Celebrity	

=== Television series ===
Year	Title	Role	Notes	Ref.
2005	The Moon and the Wind	Yang Fenghe / Yan Xiulian		
2006	Flying Like a Butterfly	Qi'er		
2006	The Young Warriors	Lady Luo		
2007	The Fairies of Liaozhai	Xin Shisiniang		
2008	The Legend of the Condor Heroes	Mu Nianci		
2009	Chinese Paladin 3	Long Kui		
2009	The Heaven Sword and Dragon Saber	Yellow Dress Maiden	Special appearance	
2010	Tale of the Oriental Serpent	Yin Shuangshuang		
2010	A Weaver on the Horizon	Zhao Jiayi		
2011	The Vigilantes In Masks	Yan Sanniang		
2011	Scarlet Heart	Ma'ertai Ruoxi / Zhang Xiao		
2012	Xuan-Yuan Sword: Scar of Sky	Taba Yu'er		
2013	The Patriot Yue Fei	Lady Yang	Special appearance	
2014	Scarlet Heart 2	Zhang Xiao / Lan Lan		
2014	Sound of the Desert	Xin Yue		
2014	Incisive Great Teacher	Lu Yunfei		
2016	The Imperial Doctress	Tan Yunxian		
2016	Precious Youth	Liu Ting		
2017	The Battle at the Dawn	Song Hongling		
2017	Angelo	Li Xiaohan		
2017	Lost Love in Times	Feng Qingchen	Co-producer	
2019	If I Can Love You So	Bai Kao'er		
2020	To Dear Myself	Li Siyu		
2020	My Best Friend's Story	Jiang Nansun		
2023	A Journey to Love	Ren Ruyi		
2025	Kill My Sins	Ye Ping'an		
2025	Love in Pavilion	Dongfang Huai Zhu		

=== Music video appearances ===
Year	Song Title		Singer	Notes/Ref.
2004	"The Night of Falling Flowers"	落花之夜	Shao Bing	
2004	"When the Wind is the Coldest"	风最冷的时候	Shao Bing	
2008	"Go and Love"	去爱吧	Hu Ge	
2009	"Love Until I Am Alone"	爱得剩我一个人	Chen Long	
2009	"Dare to Love"	敢不敢爱	Hu Ge	
2011	"I Am Not Going to be a Hero"	我不做英雄	Hu Ge	

== Discography ==
Year	English title	Chinese title	Album	Notes/Ref.
2011	"Season of Waiting"	等你的季节	Scarlet Heart OST	
2016	"Holding Hands"	手牽手		with Nicky Wu
2017	"He Zhe Ban Ruo"	何者般若	The Liquidator OST	

== Accolades ==
=== Awards and nominations ===
Major awards
Year	Award	Category	Nominated work	Result	Ref.
2012	18th Shanghai Television Festival	Most Popular Actress	Scarlet Heart	Won	
2012	18th Shanghai Television Festival	Best Actress	Scarlet Heart	Nominated	
2012	9th China Golden Eagle TV Art Festival	Golden Eagle Goddess	—N/a	Won	
2012	8th Huading Awards	Best Actress (Ancient Drama)	Scarlet Heart	Nominated	
2012	8th Huading Awards	Best New Actress	Scarlet Heart	Nominated	
2012	8th Huading Awards	Actress with the Most Media Popularity	Scarlet Heart	Won	
2014	19th Busan International Film Festival	Asian Star Award	—N/a	Won	
2014	6th Macau International Movie Festival	Best Actress	Five Minutes to Tomorrow	Nominated	
2015	6th China Film Directors' Guild Awards	Best Actress	Brotherhood of Blades	Nominated	
2015	15th Huading Awards	Best Actress (TV)	Scarlet Heart 2	Nominated	
2017	22nd Huading Awards	Best Actress	The Imperial Doctress	Nominated	
2019	Golden Bud - The Fourth Network Film And Television Festival	Best Actress	If I Can Love You So	Nominated	
Other awards
2011	Grand Ceremony of New Forces	Most Anticipated Actress by the Media	Scarlet Heart	Won	
2011	Sohu Internet TV Festival	Most Popular Actress	Scarlet Heart	Won	
2011	Sohu Internet TV Festival	Best On-screen Couple (with Nicky Wu)	Scarlet Heart	Won	
2011	2nd China Student Television Festival	Most Popular Actress	Scarlet Heart	Won	
2011	Nanning Television Festival	Audience's Favorite Actress	Scarlet Heart	Won	
2011	2011 Tudou Video Marketing Award Ceremony	Most Popular Actress	Scarlet Heart	Won	
2011	Youku Television Awards	Actress with the Most Ratings Appeal	Scarlet Heart	Won	
2011	8th Esquire Man At His Best Awards	Most Popular Female Artist	—N/a	Won	
2011	3rd China TV Drama Awards	Media Recommendation Award	—N/a	Won	
2012	5th DMA (DienAnh.Net Movie Awards)	Most Popular Actress (Mainland China)	—N/a	Won	
2012	3rd LeTV Entertainment Awards	Most Commercially Valuable Actress	—N/a	Won	
2012	4th China TV Drama Awards	Most Popular Actress	Xuan-Yuan Sword: Scar of Sky	Won	
2013	BQ Celebrity Score Awards	Most Influential Hot Figure	—N/a	Won	
2014	Weibo Awards Night	Weibo Queen	—N/a	Won	
2014	Weibo Awards Night	Weibo Goddess	—N/a	Won	
2014	8th Baidu Fudian Awards	Most Popular Female Artiste	—N/a	Won	
2014	6th China TV Drama Awards	Most Commercially Valuable Actress	—N/a	Won	
2016	1st China Television Drama Quality Ceremony	Most Influential Actress	The Imperial Doctress	Won	
2016	5th iQIYI All-Star Carnival	Best Actress (TV)	—N/a	Won	
2016	Baidu Entertainment	Figure of the Year	—N/a	Won	
2017	2nd China Television Drama Quality Ceremony	Most Influential Actress	—N/a	Won	
2018	Weibo Awards Night	Weibo Goddess	—N/a	Won	
2019	Cosmo Glam Night	Person of the Year (Dream)	—N/a	Won	
2020	Cosmo Glam Night	Person of the Year (Dream)	—N/a	Won	

=== Forbes China Celebrity 100 ===
Year	Rank	Ref.
2012	99th	
2013	57th	
2014	25th	
2015	30th	
2017	19th	
2020	29th	

== Fashion ==
In October 2017, Liu was appointed as the global ambassador for Omega. In November, at the UCCA Center for Contemporary Art in Beijing, Omega warmly celebrated her joining the Omega family during the launch event of the new Constellation 27mm limited edition watch series.

In June 2024, Liu was appointed as the global brand ambassador for Bobbi Brown.

In December 2024, Liu was appointed as the global brand ambassador for Celine. In April 2025, she unveiled Zhangyuan Pop-up of Celine in Shanghai.
