= Chinese Paladin (TV series) =

2005 Chinese television series

- DVD Cover
- Also known as: The Sword and the Fairy

Chinese name
- Traditional Chinese: 仙劍奇俠傳
- Simplified Chinese: 仙剑奇侠传
Transcriptions
Standard Mandarin
- Hanyu Pinyin: Xiān Jiàn Qí Xiá Zhuàn
- Genre: Wuxia; Romance; Fantasy; Adventure
- Written by: Deng Liqi; Huang Haolan; Zhong Zhenglong
- Directed by: Wu Jinyuan; Liang Shenzhi; Mai Guanzhi
- Starring: Hu Ge; Liu Yifei; Ady An; Esther Liu; Eddie Peng
- Opening theme: Kill the Broken Wolf by JS
- Ending theme: Finally Understand by Power Station
- Composer: Mak Chun Hung
- Country of origin: China
- Original language: Mandarin
- No. of episodes: 34 (Taiwan); 38 (Mainland China)

Production
- Producer: Lee Kwok-lap
- Running time: 45 minutes per episode

Original release
- Network: CTV
- Release: 14 January 2005 – February 2005
- Network: CBG (Mainland China)
- Release: 31 January 2005 – February 2005

Related
- Chinese Paladin 3 (2009); Chinese Paladin 5 (2016)

Chinese Paladin
- Chinese Paladin intertitle
- Traditional Chinese: 仙劍奇俠傳
- Simplified Chinese: 仙剑奇侠传
Transcriptions
Standard Mandarin
- Hanyu Pinyin: Xiān Jiàn Qí Xiá Zhuàn

Chinese Paladin (traditional Chinese: 仙劍奇俠傳; simplified Chinese: 仙剑奇侠传; pinyin: Xiān Jiàn Qí Xiá Zhuàn) is a 2005 Chinese fantasy television series adapted from the popular Taiwanese adventure role-playing video game The Legend of Sword and Fairy by Softstar Entertainment. The series was produced by Tangren Media and Chinese Entertainment Shanghai and starred cast members from Mainland China, Taiwan, Hong Kong and Singapore. It was first broadcast in January 2005 on CTV and CBG in Taiwan and mainland China respectively. The drama was hugely popular in China and achieved high ratings of 2.7.

== Cast ==
- Hu Ge as Li Xiaoyao
- Liu Yifei as Zhao Ling'er
- Ady An as Lin Yueru
- Esther Liu as A'nu
- Eddie Peng as Tang Yu
- Bryan Wong as Liu Jinyuan
- Cheng Pei-pei as Granny Jiang
- Tse Kwan Ho as Jiu Jian Xian Wine Sword Immortal
- Elvis Tsui as Shi Jie Ren the Leader of Moon Worshiping Cult
- Zhou Dehua as Zhixiu
- Guo Liang as Jiang Jue Zhi, Sword Saint
- Ben Wong as Miao King
- Leslie Sun as Miao Queen
- Patrick Tam as Jiang Ming
- Jiang Xin as Nüyuan / Jiang Wan'er
- Jess Zhang as Caiyi
- Loletta Lee as Divine Lady
- Lynn Poh as Ji Sanniang
- Deng Limin as Shi Gonghu
- Yang Minna as Fox spirit
- Sam Lee as Wang Xiaohu
- Yang Kun as Li Daniang
- Joanne Tseng as Ding Xiulan
- Achel Chang as Ding Xianglan
- Wang Lei as Lady Nanman
- Jin Xin as Lin Tiannan
- Zhou Lan as Han Mengci

== Soundtrack ==
Chinese Paladin Original Soundtrack (仙劍奇俠傳 電視原聲帶)

Soundtrack album (Digital download / Audio CD) by Various artists
- Released: 2005-03-22
- Labels: HIM International Music Co., Ltd. China (HIM 華研國際音樂股份有限公司)

=== Track listing ===
1. Yongheng De Jiyi (永恆的記憶; Everlasting Memory)
2. Zhongyu Mingbai (終於明白; Finally Understand) by Power Station
3. Xiaoyao Tan (逍遙嘆; Sigh of Xiaoyao) by Hu Ge
4. Shapolang (殺破狼; Kill the Broken Wolf) by JS
5. Hua Yu Jian (花與劍; Flower and Sword) by JS
6. Yizhi Hen Anjing (一直很安靜; Constant Silence) by A-Sun
7. Liuyue De Yu (六月的雨; June Showers) by Hu Ge
8. Hongse Pugongying (紅色蒲公英; Red Dandelion)
9. Moshi Mowang (莫失莫忘; Do Not Lose, Do Not Forget)
10. Rang Ai (讓愛; Give Up Love)
11. Yi Mo Bei (尹莫悲; Do Not Grief)
12. Wuhui Guangyin (無悔光陰; Life of No Regrets)
13. Jixu Fenzhen (繼續奮戰; Fight On)

=== Limited edition bonus tracks ===
1. Dadi Zhimu (大地之母; Mother Earth)
2. Yao Yu (妖域; Realm of Demons)
3. Taohua Dao (桃花島; Peach Blossom Island)
4. Nüwa Zhihou (女媧之後; Descendant of Nüwa)
5. Baiyue (拜月; Moon Worship)
6. Xianjian Qiyuan (仙劍奇緣; Adventure of Fairy and Sword)
7. Moshi Mowang (莫失莫忘; Do Not Lose, Do Not Forget)
8. Qianli Yinyuan Yixian Qian (千里姻緣一線牽; Thousand Whispers)
9. Kuaile Xiaoyao (快樂逍遙; Happy and Merry)
10. Lianhua Chi (蓮花池; Lotus Pond)
11. Renjian Jingling (人間精靈; Fairy in the Human World)
12. Jiuzui Sanfen Xing (酒醉三分醒; Slightly Sober in a Drunken State)
13. Mo Yu Dao (魔與道; Good and Evil)
14. Tangxue De Xin (淌血的心; Bleeding Heart)
15. Jiang Shi Gu'er (姜氏孤兒; Orphan of the Jiang family)
16. Biyi Niao (比翼鳥; Birds Flying Wing to Wing)
17. Shikong Zhilun (時空之鑰; Wheel of Time)
18. Ai De Shijie (愛的世界; World of Love)

== See also ==
- Xuan-Yuan Sword: Scar of Sky
