= 8th Huading Awards =

2012 entertainment awards

The 8th Huading Awards ceremony was held on December 10, 2012, at Shanghai. The awards are a set of entertainment awards in China.

== Nominations and winners ==
Complete list of nominees and winners (denoted in bold).

Best Director	Best Screenwriter
**Zhao Baogang** - **Beijing Youth**; Zheng Xiaolong - The Legend of Zhen Huan; Wang Zhenhong - Cherry; Yu Chun - We Love You, Mr. Jin; Teng Hua-Tao - Fu Chen	**Bao Jingjing** - **Fu Chen**; Quan Yongxian - The Brink; Liu Liu - Angel Heart; Chen Sicheng, Li Yaling - Beijing Love Story; Wang Lizhi - Scarlet Heart
Best Actor	Best Actress
**Zhang Jiayi** - **The Brink**; Nicky Wu - Scarlet Heart; Li Chen - Beijing Youth; Kevin Cheng - Scarlet Heart; Lin Yongjian - The Loop	**Li Xiaolu** - **My Mom and My Mother-in-Law**; Hai Qing - Angel Heart; Song Jia - The Brink; Myolie Wu - Ghetto Justice; Yang Mi - Ru Yi
Best Actor (Ancient Drama)	Best Actress (Ancient Drama)
**Nicky Wu** - **Scarlet Heart**; Chen Jianbin - The Legend of Zhen Huan; Yu Rongguang - Turbulence of the Mu Clan; Kevin Cheng - Scarlet Heart; Yu Shaoqun - Secret History of Empress Wu	**Gillian Chung** - **Secret History of Empress Wu**; Cecilia Liu - Scarlet Heart; Miao Pu - Mu Guiying Takes Command; Ruby Lin - The Glamorous Imperial Concubine; Yin Tao - Secret History of Empress Wu
Best Actor (Legend Drama)	Best Actress (Legend Drama)
**Hu Ge** - **Xuan-Yuan Sword: Scar of Sky**; Jiang Wu - Xiang Dong Shi Da Hai; Wallace Chung - The Magic Blade; Wang Zhifei - Xiang Dong Shi Da Hai; Liu Yunlong - The Informant	**Vivienne Liu** - **Xiang Dong Shi Da Hai**; Yang Mi - Beauty World; Tiffany Tang - Xuan-Yuan Sword: Scar of Sky; Jiang Mengjie - Hidden Intention; Wang Likun - The Informant
Best Actor (Revolution-Era Drama)	Best Actress (Revolution-Era Drama)
**Jiang Wu** - **Shi Yan Jin Sheng**; Huang Zhizhong - Drawing Sword; Yu Hewei - Qing Mang; Yang Zhigang - Detachment of Women; Cao Bingkun - Golden Code	**Tang Yifei** - **Zheng Zhe Wu Di**; Wang Luodan - Detachment of Women; Choo Ja-hyun - Wipe Out the Bandits of Wulong Mountain; Chen Shu - Zheng Zhe Wu Di; Mei Ting - Walking on the Tip
Best Actor (Contemporary Drama)	Best Actress (Contemporary Drama)
**Jia Nailiang** - **My Mom and My Mother-in-Law**; Wu Xiubo - Angel Heart; Xu Yajun - Lao Ba De Tong Zi Lou; Huang Lei - Husband and Wife; Li Baotian - Clown Dad	**Jiang Shan** - **The Forties Destiny**; Bai Baihe - Fu Chen; Yao Qianyu - How a Daughter-in-Law is Made; Myolie Wu - Ghetto Justice; Li Xiaoran - Qian Duo Duo Marry Remember
Best Actor (Modern Drama)	Best Actress (Modern Drama)
**Song Xiaobao** - **Cherry**; Wang Lei - We Love You, Mr. Jin; Sun Yizhou - iPartment 3; Guo Degang - Dream Back to Tang Dynasty; Liu Xiaoguang - Countryside Love	**Song Chunli** - **Man Qiu**; Lou Yixiao - iPartment 3; Mai Hongmei - Running into Good Luck; Yu Yuexian - Countryside Love; Pan Hong - Dream Back to Tang Dynasty
Best Actor (Youth Drama)	Best Actress (Youth Drama)
**Li Chen** - **Beijing Youth**; Chen Sicheng - Beijing Love Story; Ren Zhong - AA Life Style; Eddie Peng - My Sassy Girl; Roy Qiu - Waking Love Up	**Ma Su** - **Beijing Youth**; Yao Di - Men; Joe Chen - The Queen of SOP; Tong Liya - Beijing Love Story; Han Chae-young - Unbeatable
Best Supporting Actor	Best Supporting Actress
**Cheng Yu** - **The Brink**; Fan Ming - We Love You, Mr. Jin; Wang Yaoqing - Fu Chen; Zhang Xiaolong - The Legend of Zhen Huan; Ray Lui - Turbulence of the Mu Clan	**Fu Yiwei** - **The Magic Blade**; Liu Lili - AA Lifestyle; Li Qinqin - My Mom and My Mother-in-Law; Ada Choi - The Legend of Zhen Huan; Pan Hong - My Mom and My Mother-in-Law
Best New Actor	Best New Actress
**Wang Lei** - **We Love You, Mr. Jin**; Zhai Tianlin - Angel Heart; Li Dongxue - The Legend of Zhen Huan; Lin Gengxin - Scarlet Heart; Du Jiang - Green Elain	**Ying Er** - **Xiao Ju's Spring**; Wang Sisi - The Forties Destiny; Zhang Li - Beijing Youth; Cecilia Liu - Scarlet Heart; Zhang Zixuan - Fashion Girl Editor
Most Popular with the Media (Actor)	Most Popular with the Media (Actress)
**Nicky Wu** - **Scarlet Heart**; Li Chen - Beijing Youth; Zhang Jiayi - The Brink; Wu Xiubo - Angel Heart; Chen Jianbin - The Legend of Zhen Huan	**Cecilia Liu** - **Scarlet Heart**; Hai Qing - Angel Heart; Song Jia - The Brink; Ma Su - Beijing Youth; Sun Li - The Legend of Zhen Huan
Top 10 Dramas	Audience's Favorite Stars
**The Brink**; We Love You, Mr. Jin; Angel Heart; Scarlet Heart; Beijing Youth; The Legend of Zhen Huan; Cherry; Fu Chen; Zheng Zhe Wu Di; Walking on the Tip	Xu Yajun; Maggie Shiu; Shen Chunyang; Liu Lili; Sun Chun; Siqin Gaowa; Li Liqun; Liu Xiaoqing; Zhang Jiayi; Li Xiaolu
Best Production Company	Outstanding Achievement Award
**Tangren Media** - **Scarlet Heart, Xuan-Yuan Sword: Scar of Sky**; **Benshan Media** - **Cherry, Countryside Love**; **Beijing TV Art Center** - **The Legend of Zhen Huan**; Beijing Xinbaoyuan Film & Television Investment - Beijing Youth, Men; SMG Pictures - The Brink	**Li Xuejian**; **Xi Meijuan**
