= If I Can Love You So =

- Promotional image
- Traditional Chinese: 如果可以這樣愛
- Simplified Chinese: 如果可以这样爱
- Hanyu Pinyin: Rúguǒ Kěyǐ Zhèyàng Ài
- Genre: Romantic
- Based on: If I Can Love You So by Qianxun Qianxun
- Written by: Qianxun Qianxun
- Directed by: Wang Lei
- Starring: Liu Shishi; Tong Dawei; Bao Jianfeng
- Country of origin: China
- Original language: Mandarin
- No. of seasons: 1
- No. of episodes: 46

Production
- Executive producers: Zhang Jing; Tong Dawei; Zhang Wei; Zhao Zhigang; Zhou Liqiang
- Production locations: Beijing, Hunan, Seattle, Vancouver
- Production companies: Dongyang Kingrain Media Co., Ltd; Beijing Tongyue Mingxing Culture Media Co., Ltd. Beijing Zijin Alliance Television Culture Co., Ltd; Dream Films

Original release
- Network: Hunan Television
- Release: April 9, 2019

If I Can Love You So (Chinese: 如果可以这样爱) is a 2019 Chinese romance television series starring Liu Shishi, Tong Dawei and Bao Jianfeng, based on Qianxun Qianxun's novel of the same name. The TV series will be broadcast on Hunan Satellite TV from April 9, 2019 at 20 p.m. The TV series follows the story of a woman in a love triangle with two men.

== Synopsis ==
Bai Kao'er, a television host found out her husband Qi Shujie had died in a car accident. Her deceased husband was discovered with another woman named Ye Sha. Ye Sha's husband was a renowned pianist Geng Mochi. Bai Kao'er and Geng Mochi met at their respective partner's funeral and blamed each other for their husband and wife's affair. Yet, the hate for each other soon turns to love and they forgive each other. Matters become complicated when Qi Shujie's brother Qi Shuli also falls in love with Bai Kao'er.

== Cast ==
=== Main ===
- Liu Shishi as Bai Kao'er, a radio anchorwoman.
- Tong Dawei as Geng Mochi, a pianist.
- Bao Jianfeng as Qi Shuli, a business elite.

=== Supporting ===
- Yang Yitong as Mi Lan
- Qi Huan as Ying Zhi
- Guo Xiaoxiao as Wei Minglun
- Zhu Tie as Zhang Qianshan
- Lai Jin as Jin Yi
- Sun Zhihong as Luo Hao
- Tao Hai as Huang Zhong, a lawyer.
- Yang Kaihan as Doctor Cai.
- Pu Chaoying as Mi Lan's mother.
- Ru Ping as Bai Kao'er's mother.
- Xie Yuan as Bai Kao'er's father.

== Production ==
In order to achieve the best results, Qianxun Qianxun revised the script several times and studied in Beijing Film Academy for six months.

In 2015, Liu Shishi (Chinese Paladin 3 and Scarlet Heart) announced that she would be starring as Bai Kao'er, the female lead. actors Tong Dawei (Jade Goddess of Mercy and Struggle) and Bao Jianfeng (Lady Wu: The First Empress and The Prince of Qin, Li Shimin) were cast in lead roles for the drama.

The Clothing modeling team of Tiny Times were hired as the costume designer.

Shooting began on October 8, 2015 in a little town of Xiangxi Tujia and Miao Autonomous Prefecture, Hunan and ended on January 30, 2016. Filming locations included Beijing, Hunan, Seattle, and Vancouver.

== Ratings ==
- Highest ratings are marked in red, lowest ratings are marked in blue

Air date	Hunan TV CSM55 City ratings			National Internet ratings		
Air date	Ratings (%)	Rating share (%)	Rank	Ratings (%)	Rating share (%)	Rank
2019.4.9	1.079	4.4	2	0.88	3.94	2
2019.4.10	0.905	3.57	4	0.78	3.23	1
2019.4.11	0.959	3.79	3	0.71	2.97	1
2019.4.12	0.587	2.28	5	0.49	1.97	3
2019.4.13	0.757	2.84	3	0.62	2.41	2
2019.4.14	1.056	4.03	2	0.75	3.08	2
2019.4.15	1.144	4.41	1	0.92	3.84	1
2019.4.16	1.104	4.38	1	0.85	3.61	1
2019.4.17	1.094	4.39	2	0.83	3.59	1
2019.4.18	1.05	4.16	1	0.84	3.53	1
2019.4.19	0.82	3.1	3	0.58	2.36	3
2019.4.20	0.86	3.29	1	0.57	2.3	2
2019.4.21	1.157	4.47	1	0.86	3.58	1
2019.4.22	1.363	5.49	1	0.88	3.72	1
2019.4.23	1.342	5.37	1	0.89	3.85	1
2019.4.24	0.522	2.02	5	0.4	1.76	5
2019.4.25	1.126	4.56	1	0.83	3.66	1
2019.4.27	0.89	3.16	5	0.69	2.64	1
2019.4.28	1.194	4.52	1	0.92	3.77	1
2019.4.29	1.108	4.26	1	0.98	4.01	1
2019.4.30	1.384	5.34	1	1.21	4.76	1
2019.5.1	0.712	2.94	5	0.48	2.15	2
2019.5.3	0.716	2.89	5	0.54	2.32	2
2019.5.4	0.978	3.16	2	0.79	3.28	1
2019.5.5	1.271	4.86	2	1	4.06	1
2019.5.6	0.84	3.02	5	0.86	3.26	1

== Awards and nominations ==
Award	Category	Nominee	Results	Ref.
Golden Bud - The Fourth Network Film And Television Festival	Best Actor	Tong Dawei	Nominated	
Golden Bud - The Fourth Network Film And Television Festival	Best Actress	Liu Shishi	Nominated	
