= Xuan Yuan Sword Luminary =

Japanese anime television series

軒轅剣 蒼き曜 (Ken En Ken: Aoki Kagayaki)
- Anime television series
- Directed by: Hiroshi Watanabe
- Produced by: Mirai Yamauchi; Xu Xiaolong
- Written by: Katsuhiko Takayama
- Music by: Seiji Hotta
- Studio: Studio Deen
- Original network: TV Tokyo
- Original run: October 1, 2018 – December 24, 2018
- Episodes: 13

Xuan Yuan Sword Luminary (軒轅剣 蒼き曜, Ken En Ken: Aoki Kagayaki) is a Japanese anime television series co-produced by TV Tokyo, Softstar and Nada Holdings, and animated by Studio Deen. It is based on the Taiwanese role-playing video game Xuan-Yuan Sword: The Millennial Destiny. The series is being streamed by Crunchyroll among the world except for Asia. It aired between October 1 and December 24, 2018.

== Characters ==
=== Main characters ===
Fu Yin (苻殷, Fu In)
Voiced by: Nana Mizuki
Yin and her sister Ning grew up in a small village alongside their friend Zhao, however the Imperial army attacked and destroyed their village, leaving Yin and Ning as nomads. As they travel to different villages performing their swordplay for a source of revenue, Yin discovers a Tianshu scroll containing a powerful Mujia spirit, Yun and a sword, forcing her to submit to a path of fighting against Taibai Empire, becoming a member of Resistance group led by Xiang Chu.
Fu Ning (苻寧, Fu Nei)
Voiced by: Rie Kugimiya
Ning is Yin's younger sister who had feelings for Zhao, but were unrequited. When the Imperial army attacked their village, Ning lost her arms and became nomads with her sister. They both travel to different villages and perform swordplay as their only source of revenue. When Yin discovers a Tianshu scroll containing a Mujia spirit named Yun, Yun creates magnetic prosthetic arms for Ning.
Pu Zhao (蒲釗, Pu Shō)
Voiced by: Yoshitsugu Matsuoka
Zhao is the childhood friend of Yin and Ning from their village who had feelings for Yin, but was also unaware of Ning's feelings for him. When the Imperial army attacked their village, Zhao was captured and taken into slavery, while his childhood friends suspect that he is dead. In the years that pass, Zhao learns how to read and write while learning how to read Construct blueprints and is taken under the tutelage of Mo Heng, the Chief Engineer of the Taibai Empire. After Mo Heng defected to Resistance group led by Xiang Chu, Zhao is visited by the young Empress Long Cheng, who is unaware of her identity and reveals his past and desire to end the war. Later the imperials capture Zhao thinking that he helped Mo Heng escape. However the appearance of Long Cheng and the revelation of her identity to Zhao (and the audience) granted him immunity, as well as a noble title and position of Chief Engineer.
Yun (雲, Yun)
Voiced by: Mamiko Noto
Yun is a girl form Mujia android who can be transformed into a more powerful fox-shaped fighting robot "Yun-hu" (雲狐). Crafted by a girl named Che Yun (protagonist of the original video game) in about 400 years ago, and sealed into Tianshu scroll. Yun can only be summoned by someone who is reincarnation of Che Yun.

=== Taibai Empire ===
Long Cheng (龍澄, Ron Chō)
Voiced by: Sumire Uesaka
Cheng is a little girl and the current Empress of the Taibai Empire. After meeting Zhao for the first time and introducing herself as just a girl who wanted to know Zhao, she learns of his true ambitions and reveals her true identity to him, granting him immunity and a royal title. Throughout the series, she would sneak out of her own room to hang out with Zhao.
Shang Yue (商嶽, Shō Gaku)
Voiced by: Shōya Chiba
Baili Zhen (百里貞, Hyakuri Tei)
Voiced by: Mami Kingetsu
Meng Ji (蒙忌, Mō Ki)
Voiced by: Yūsuke Shirai
Long Xiao (龍驍, Ron Gyō)
Voiced by: Kōji Ishii
Lady Pang (龐夫人, Pan Fujin)
Voiced by: Miki Itō
Long Juan (龍涓, Ron Ken)
Voiced by: Rina Endō
Xin Wuxu (辛無恤, Shin Mujutsu)
Voiced by: Yūji Kameyama
Li Xiang (梨香, Ri Kō)
Voiced by: Hisako Tōjō

=== Resistance ===
Xiang Chu (項楚, Kō So)
Voiced by: Kenjiro Tsuda
Tan Yuezhi (檀越之, Tan Etsushi)
Voiced by: Hiroki Tōchi
Luanti Chi (欒提熾, Lantei Shi)
Voiced by: Chado Horii
Muyu Rou (慕輿柔, Boyo Jū)
Voiced by: Ruriko Aoki
Tuoba Yuan (拓跋淵, Takubatsu En)
Voiced by: Taku Yashiro
Can Lang (参狼, San Rō)
Voiced by: Yoshitaka Yamaya
Mo Heng (墨衡, Boku Kō)
Voiced by: Shigeru Ushiyama
