= Gavin Lin =

Taiwanese film director

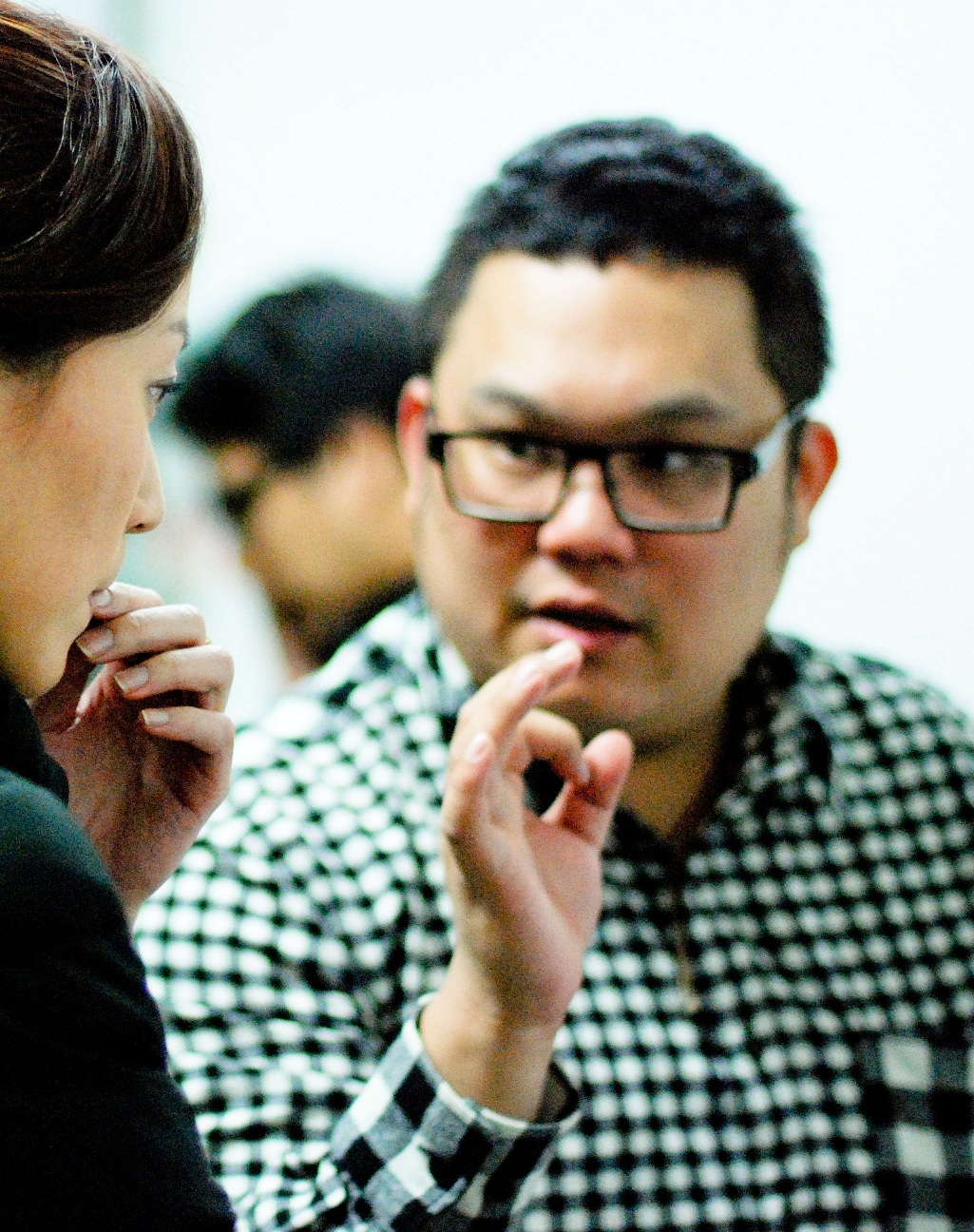
Lin in 2011

Gavin Lin (Chinese: 林孝謙; born 4 May 1980) is a Taiwanese film director. He attended Pittsburg State University.

Lin's debut feature film, In Case of Love, was released in 2010. The next year, he directed Revenge of the Factory Woman. A Moment of Love followed in 2013. In 2016, Lin directed Welcome to the Happy Days, a film in the Metro of Love series. In 2018, Lin directed More than Blue, a remade South Korean film.
