= Xuan-Yuan Sword: Scar of Sky =

2012 Chinese television series

- Promotional poster
- Genre: Wuxia; Romance; Fantasy; Adventure
- Directed by: Lee Kwok-lap
- Starring: Hu Ge; Jiang Jinfu; Cecilia Liu; Tiffany Tang; Guli Nazha; Lin Gengxin
- Voices of: Yang Menglu, Sun Ye, Hu Ge
- Opening theme: Kiss until the End of Time by Hu Ge
- Ending theme: Love Like This by Jeanie Zhang
- Country of origin: China
- Original language: Mandarin
- No. of episodes: 35

Production
- Producers: Lee Kwok-lap; Karen Tsoi
- Production location: China
- Production company: Chinese Entertainment Shanghai

Original release
- Network: Hunan Broadcasting System (HBS)
- Release: 6 July 2012

Xuan-Yuan Sword: Scar of Sky
- Traditional Chinese: 軒轅劍之天之痕
- Simplified Chinese: 轩辕剑之天之痕
Transcriptions
Standard Mandarin
- Hanyu Pinyin: Xuān Yuán Jiàn Zhī Tiān Zhī Hén

Xuan-Yuan Sword: Scar of Sky (Chinese: 軒轅劍之天之痕) is a 2012 Chinese television series adapted from Xuan-Yuan Sword, a series of role-playing video games developed by Taiwanese company Softstar Entertainment Inc. The television series is produced by Chinese Entertainment Shanghai and stars Hu Ge, Jiang Jinfu, Cecilia Liu, Tiffany Tang, Guli Nazha and Lin Gengxin. The series aired on Hunan Broadcasting System (HBS) from 6 July 2012 and runs for 35 episodes.

The series broke the record to become the highest rated weekly broadcast drama, before being surpassed three years later by The Journey of Flower. It also garnered 2 billion views online, becoming the 9th drama in Hunan TV's broadcast history to achieve the feat.

== Synopsis ==
In AD 619, Emperor Yang of the Sui dynasty rules China with an iron fist. During this period of unrest, legends foretold of a Red Star that would open the Mark of the Heavens and bring about the apocalypse. To combat the opening of the Mark, a scion of royalty would be born and seal it with the Xuan-Yuan Sword.

The happy-go-lucky Chen Jingchou (Jiang Jinfu), last prince of the fallen Chen dynasty, is burdened with the avenging and resurrection of his realm, but he merely wishes a happy life. His long suffering attendant, Chen Fu, who accompanies him on his travels discovers that the fastest way to restoring the empire is to gather five mysterious artifacts, which will grant the wielder untold power. Under Chen Fu's relentless encouragement, Chen begins the quest to gather these artifacts. However, his quest forces him to face Yuwen Tuo, a golden armored and masked warrior who single-handedly destroyed the Chen's armies at the age of 10 while wielding the legendary Xuan-Yuan Sword.

Yuwen Tuo (Hu Ge), outwardly a ruthless warrior, is also the last prince of the fallen Northern Zhou dynasty. At the fall of his dynasty, Yuwen's father was killed in battle and his mother taken hostage in the Sui palace. To save his mother, Yuwen chose the unorthodox path of joining the Sui dynasty and becoming a feared assassin for the regime that destroyed his kingdom. His only hope lay in the same five mysterious artifacts that Chen sought. Their quests brought them together and in a twist of fate, the two who would be enemies become friends. On their journey, they meet Taba Yu'er, princess of a desert tribe (Cecilia Liu), Dugu Ningke (Tiffany Tang), princess of Sui and Yu Xiaoxue (Guli Nazha), the daughter of the goddess Nüwa, who would grow to love Yuwen Tuo.

After many trials and tribulations, the artifacts are gathered but Yuwen Tuo betrays Jing Chou and sacrifices the love that had grown between him and Xiao Xue, by stealing the artifacts. In a twist, the truth behind the artifacts is revealed. Ning Ke, who appeared to be the niece of Emperor Yang, was in actuality the daughter of the Demon Lord who had been sent to spy on those who would gather the artifacts. Yuwen Tuo, believing that the artifacts would save his mother, had in fact been acting according to the Demon Lord's plot to use the artifacts to open the Mark of the Heavens.

Having been betrayed by his friend, Chen Jingchou succumbs to hatred and, falling under the Demon Lord's sway, sets forth to kill Yuwen Tuo to avenge his betrayal and Yu'er's death. However, to save their world, the two eventually put aside their vendettas and seal the Mark of the Heavens.

== Cast ==
=== Main ===
- Hu Ge as Yuwen Tuo (宇文拓) / Jian Chi (劍癡)

The last prince of the fallen Northern Zhou dynasty, who is forced to submit to the Sui dynasty. In order to revive his kingdom and save his mother, Yuwen Tuo embarks on a journey to seek the five mysterious artifacts. Although he is outwardly cold-hearted and ruthless, he is actually lonely and forlorn on the inside. Hu simultaneously plays Jian Chi, an alternation of his soul who is kind and innocent.

- Jiang Jinfu as Chen Jingchou (陳靖仇)

The happy-go-lucky and kind-hearted last prince of the fallen Chen dynasty. Although he wants to live a carefree life, he is burdened with the task of resurrecting his empire. Throughout his journey, he grows from a bubbling and childish prince to a brave and dignified ruler. He often squabbles with Taba Yu'er, whom he later fell in love with.

- Cecilia Liu as Taba Yu'er (拓跋玉兒)

The second princess of the Northern Ta Ba tribe. After getting her heart broken from Zhang Lie's marriage to her older sister, she left her homeland and embarked on an adventure to seek the artifacts in order to revive her tribe and find a cure for her sister's leg. Along the journey, she meets Chen Jingchou, whom she often squabbles and later fall in love with. She appears spoilt and unruly, but is kind-hearted.

- Tiffany Tang as Dugu Ningke (獨孤寧珂)

The princess of the Sui dynasty, whose hidden identity is the daughter of the Demon Lord who had been sent to spy on those who would gather the artifacts. She loves Yuwen Tuo, whom she grew up with, and later betrays her tribe in order to protect their love.

- Guli Nazha as Yu Xiaoxue (于小雪)

The descendant of goddess Nüwa, who possesses an extraordinary ability to heal and treat illnesses. She is innocent and kind in nature, and loves Jian Chi.

- Lin Gengxin as Zhang Lie (張烈)

The King of the Northern Ta Ba tribe. He is brave, courageous and has an ambition to over-topple the cruel and barbaric Sui dynasty in order to protect his tribe. He loves Yu'er since they were young, but was ordered to marry her sister by the late Taba King. Later, he would grow to love Taba Yue'er and become a just ruler.

=== Supporting ===
==== South dynasty ====
- Ma Tianyu as Lü Chengzhi (吕承志)

The future king of the South dynasty. He is a kind and benevolent person whose aspiration is to become a good Emperor to his people.

- Su Mao as Lü Kai (吕开)
- Lu Kai as Zhao Feihu (赵飞虎)
- Wang Xiaodong as Zhu Jinlong (朱金龙)

==== Chen dynasty ====
- Eddy Ko as Chen Fu (陈辅)

Chen Jingchou's teacher and advisor of the Chen dynasty.

- Xiao Rongcheng as Emperor of the Chen dynasty (陈后主)
- Zhang Xiang as Chen Feng (辰风)
- Li Weiting as Kun Yu (申雨)
- Yao Yichuan as Shu Dian (戍电)
- Luo Mi as Mao Huo (卯火)
- Wu Haoyu as Little Pighead (小猪头)

==== Sui dynasty and Northern Zhou dynasty ====
- Ba Sen as Yang Su (杨素)

A minister of the Sui dynasty who is used as a pawn by the Demon Lord to gather the five artifacts. He is cruel and barbaric, and holds Shan Yuwu in captive to control and manipulate Yuwen Tuo.

- Zhao Yi as Emperor Yang of Sui (隋炀帝)
- Zhang Wenjun as Yang Xie (杨硕)
- Li Xianfu as Han Teng (韩腾)

==== Ta Ba tribe ====
- Huang Yingxuan as Hong Fu'nv (红拂女)

Yu'er's companion and bodyguard. She later betrayed Yu'er and helped the Rabbit Demon, hoping that the demon could help her revive her dead husband.

- Li Chengyuan as Taba Yue'er (挞拔月儿)

Taba Yu'er's sister and the Queen of Ta Ba tribe.

- Zhou Shaodong as late Taba King (挞拔大汗)

==== Demon tribe ====
- Guo Hongqing as Demon Lord (魔君)

A vengeful man who wants to seek revenge on the Heavenly Emperor, as he was banished from the heavenly realm thousand years ago. He uses Yang Su and Yuwen Tuo as pawns to help him gather the five ancient artifacts.

- Tian Diaoxia as Shu Xiang (书香)

A book demon who is loyal to Dugu Ningke.

- Cecilia Yip as Shan Yuwu (单羽舞)

Empress of Northern Zhou and Yuwen Tuo's mother. Her actual identity is a demon who serves under Dugu Ningke. She was captured by Yang Su and used as a pawn to threaten Yuwen Tuo into doing his bidding.

=== Extended ===
- Michelle Yim as Nüwa (女娲)
- Cheng Peipei as Granny Ma (马婆婆)

A descendant of the Qin Long immortal Dragon tribe who protects Yu Xiaoxue when she is asleep.

- Ye Qing as Mo Ruyan (如烟)

A kind-hearted girl who resides at Moon River City. She feels inferior because of the scar on a face, and dares not approach her love Lu Chengzhi. She later sold her soul to the Crimson Demonic Star and turns into a dream demon; and creates an alternate dream world where she can be with her beloved.

- Wang Wei as Rabbit Demon (兔魔)
  - Li Chengyuan as Xiao Yu, the true nature of the rabbit spirit.

A rabbit spirit who fell in love with Zhang Lie. She takes control of Taba Yue'er's body in order to with him. In order to remain in her human form, she absorbed the essence of the Taba villagers and turned them into rabbits.

- Lawrence Ng as Gu Yue Immortal (古月仙人)

A fox demon who was the former Earthly Emperor.

- Lü Yi as Queen of Di Tribe (氐人族女皇)

A beautiful woman who loves Gu Yue Immortal.

- Wang Chunyuan as Ran Weng Immortal (然翁仙人)
- Deng Limin as Huang Hanxing (黄汉兴)
- Yu Qingxue as King Shan Mei (山魅王)
- Han Zhenhua as Eunuch Han (韩公公)
- Li Weiting as Kun Yu (申雨)
- Zhang Xiang as Chen Feng (辰風)
- Yao Yiqi as Wu Dian (戌電)
- Luo Mi as Ying Huo (卯火)
- Wang Dachi as Jia Bujia (贾不贾) / Jia Hushi (贾虎氏) / Jia Dakong (贾大空)

A family of commerce traders who possesses various prized weapons.

- Wu Ze Jin Xi as Ning Er (宁儿)

Yuwen Tuo and Dugu Ningke's son.

== Soundtrack ==
Xuan-Yuan Sword: Scar of Sky - Original Television Soundtrack (轩辕剑之天之痕电视剧原声音乐大碟)
No.	Title	Music	Length
1.	"Kiss until the End of Time (一吻天荒)"	Hu Ge
2.	"Love Like This (這樣愛了)"	Jeanie Zhang
3.	"Fingerprint (指紋)"	Hu Ge
4.	"If You Love Me (如果你愛我)"	Cao Xuanbin

== Ratings ==
Week #	Air date	Episode #	Friday		Saturday		Average
Week #	Air date	Episode #	First episode	Second ep	First ep	Second ep	Average
1	7.06-7.07	01-04	1.943	1.477	2.201	1.445	1.767
1	7.06-7.07	01-04	(6.98)	(10.43)	(7.50)	(9.88)	(8.70)
2	7.13-7.14	05-08	1.950	1.562	2.172	1.664	1.837
2	7.13-7.14	05-08	(6.59)	(9.78)	(7.33)	(10.05)	(8.44)
3	7.20-7.21	09-12	1.686	1.445	2.187	1.750	1.767
3	7.20-7.21	09-12	(5.63)	(8.12)	(7.27)	(9.82)	(7.71)
4	7.27-7.28	13-16	1.590	1.457	1.920	1.476	1.611
4	7.27-7.28	13-16	(5.04)	(8.22)	(5.96)	(7.69)	(6.73)
5	8.03-8.04	17-20	1.565	1.256	1.906	1.497	1.556
5	8.03-8.04	17-20	(4.76)	(6.39)	(6.86)	(7.57)	(6.39)
6	8.10-8.11	21-24	1.462	1.241	1.878	1.343	1.481
6	8.10-8.11	21-24	(4.82)	(7.39)	(6.26)	(7.56)	(6.50)
7	8.17-8.18	25-28	1.468	1.214	1.817	1.407	1.477
7	8.17-8.18	25-28	(4.77)	(6.89)	(6.19)	(7.81)	(6.42)
8	8.24-8.25	29-32	1.300	1.147	1.874	1.558	1.470
8	8.24-8.25	29-32	(4.40)	(6.60)	(6.25)	(7.59)	(6.21)
9	8.31-9.01	33-36	1.452	1.244	1.927	1.721	1.586
9	8.31-9.01	33-36	(4.97)	(7.41)	(6.76)	(10.32)	(7.37)
Average ratings							1.617
Average audience share							(7.16)

== Awards ==
Year	Award	Category	Winner
2012	Huading Awards	Best Actor (legend)	Hu Ge
2012	China TV Drama Awards	Most Popular Actor	Hu Ge
2012	China TV Drama Awards	Most Popular Actress	Cecilia Liu
2013	China Student Television Festival	Most Popular Actor	Hu Ge
2013	China Student Television Festival	Most Popular Fantasy Drama	Xuan-Yuan Sword: Scar of Sky

== See also ==
- Chinese Paladin (TV series)
- Chinese Paladin 3
- Chinese Paladin 5
- Xuan-Yuan Sword Legend: The Clouds of Han
