= A Moment of Love =

- Film poster
- Traditional Chinese: 回到愛開始的地方
- Simplified Chinese: 回到爱开始的地方
- Literal meaning: Back to Where Love Began
- Hanyu Pinyin: Huí Dào Ài Kāishǐ de Dìfāng
- Directed by: Gavin Lin
- Written by: Carrie Luo; Hermes Lu; Gavin Lin
- Produced by: Yan Yu; Wei Xing; Qian Dewei
- Starring: Vic Chou; Liu Shishi
- Cinematography: Feng Hsin-hua
- Edited by: Cheung Ka-fai
- Music by: Europa Huang; Qin Xuzhang
- Production companies: Stellar Mega Pictures; Polyface Films; Vision Film Workshop
- Release date: August 23, 2013
- Running time: 94 minutes
- Countries: China; Taiwan
- Languages: Mandarin; Some Lahu; English
- Box office: $1.7 million

A Moment of Love is a 2013 Chinese-Taiwanese drama-romance film directed by Gavin Lin and starring Liu Shishi and Vic Chou.

== Plot ==
Ji Yaqing goes on a business trip right before her wedding. She meets on her stay at the hotel a young man intent on the search of an old lady, having in his possession only letters his grandfather wrote before dying. They go together on a journey in the country scenery of China, in the quest of the lady in the letters. This journey yet holds more for both of them, as they discover what love could mean and bring.

== Cast ==
- Liu Shishi as Ji Yaqing (#1), a Beijing-based magazine journalist
- Zhou Yiwei as Cheng Zhiyuan, Ji Yaqing (#1)'s fiancé
- Liu Yun as Vivian, Ji Yaqing (#1)'s best friend
- Wang Lie as Derrick, Vivian's boyfriend
- Ji Qin as Ji Yaqing (#2), an old lady in Yunnan
  - Ai Yuqiao as younger Ji Yaqing (#2)
- Vic Chou as Xu Nianzu, a Taiwanese tourist
  - Chiu Chen-en as young Xu Nianzu
- Chang Fu-chien as Xu Xianda, Xu Nianzu's adoptive grandfather, who moved from Yunnan to Taiwan in the 1940s
  - Zhang Aijun as younger Xu Xianda
