= Meet Miss Anxiety =

- Film poster
- Directed by: Kwak Jae-yong
- Written by: Cao Jinling
- Produced by: Tian Tian; Lin Zhenghao
- Starring: Zhou Xun; Tong Dawei
- Cinematography: Park Cheon-bog; Go Su Bok
- Edited by: Hu Shuzhen; Yang Tingting
- Music by: Choi Seung-hyun; Liu Jia; You Mingxun
- Production companies: New Classic Media Corporation; Tencent Video; Beijing Sankuai On-line Technology Co., Ltd
- Release date: December 12, 2014
- Running time: 98 minutes
- Country: China
- Language: Mandarin
- Box office: ¥139.17 million (China)

Meet Miss Anxiety (Chinese: 我的早更女友) is a 2014 Chinese romantic comedy film directed by Kwak Jae-yong and starring Zhou Xun and Tong Dawei. It was released on December 12 in China.

The movie is a romantic comedy film that focuses on the love story of a young couple, Qi Jia and Yuan Xiaoou. Qi Jia is a young girl, but because of work pressure and life trifles and early into menopause, become irritable, emotional instability. Yuan Xiaoou is her college classmate and good friend, has been silently guarding her side, and eventually the two develop a deep relationship.

== Plot ==
Qi Jia has been dating her boyfriend Liu Chong for many years, and they have always had a very good relationship. However, what Qi Jia did not expect was that what she thought was a graduation wedding with a wedding dress turned out to be a love funeral rejected by her boyfriend. An unforgettable failed relationship became a nightmare that the 26-year-old could never escape: emotional out-of-control, menstrual disorders, neurasthenia, and a mess.

When Qi Jia, who was ruthlessly sentenced by the doctor to "early menopause", closed her heart to escape everything, the best warm man Yuan Xiaoou came to her side, and his meticulous care was as warm as the sun. Every day, various "tragedies" of bullying and being bullied were staged in a ridiculous way. In the end, the warm man Yuan Xiaoou used his unremitting efforts to help the girl regain her youth and love.

== Cast ==
- Zhou Xun
- Tong Dawei
- Wallace Chung
- Zhang Zilin
- Kuo Shu-yao
- Chan Fai-hung
- Li Jing
- White. K
- Wu Bi
- Mo Xi-er

== Box office ==
By December 20, 2014, the film had earned ¥139.17 million at the Chinese box office.

== Reception ==
Film Business Asia gave Meet Miss Anxiety a six out of ten rating, referring to it as an "attractive rom-com cast is ill-served by a poor script and routine direction".
