= Xuan-Yuan Sword =

Series of Chinese role-playing video games

Xuan-Yuan Sword (Chinese: 軒轅劍, literally "Sword of the Xuan-Yuan") is a long-running historical fantasy role-playing video game series developed for personal computers by the DOMO Studio (DOMO小組/多魔小組) of the Taiwanese game developer Softstar Entertainment. The games incorporate heavily elements of Chinese mythology, and is one of the so-called "Twin Swords of Softstar" (大宇雙劍) along with The Legend of Sword and Fairy, a sister fantasy RPG series also developed by Softstar.

In time immemorial, the titular Xuan-Yuan Sword was wielded by Yellow Emperor to defend Ancient China against the warlord Chi You and his aggressive subjects. After Chi You's defeat, the future for the five-thousand-year-old history of China was secured, and the sword was passed on from Yellow Emperor to future generations to continue to defend the world against evil. Due to its great power, the sword was often sought by treacherous individuals to further their own ends.

A recurring item of the series is the Monster Fusion Vessel (Lian Yao Hu, 煉妖壺), created by the goddess Nüwa in emulation of the Immortal Creation Ding (造物仙鼎) to cleanse the world. Within the Vessel resides an immortal entity known as the Spirit in the Vessel. The Vessel's powers are to absorb nonhuman creatures, and to transmute them into other creatures or items.

== Main series ==
Release timeline
1990	Xuan-Yuan Sword
1991
1992
1993
1994	Xuan-Yuan Sword II
1995	Xuan-Yuan Sword Gaiden: Dance of the Maple Leaves
1996
1997
1998
1999	Xuan-Yuan Sword III: Mists Beyond the Mountains
2000	Xuan-Yuan Sword III Gaiden: The Scar of Sky
2001
2002	Xuan-Yuan Sword IV
2003
2004	Xuan-Yuan Sword Gaiden: The Millennial Destiny
2005
2006	Xuan-Yuan Sword V
2007	Xuan-Yuan Sword Gaiden: The Cloud of Han
2008
2009
2010	Xuan-Yuan Sword Gaiden: The Clouds Faraway
2011
2012
2013	Xuan-Yuan Sword VI
2014
2015	Xuan-Yuan Sword Gaiden: The Gate of Firmament
2016
2017
2018
2019
2020	Xuan-Yuan Sword VII

The Xuan-Yuan Sword series is the oldest and longest living Chinese RPG series, totaling 13 RPGs with ancient Chinese-style stories set in ancient Chinese backgrounds. They are:

- Xuan-Yuan Sword
- Xuan-Yuan Sword II
  - Xuan-Yuan Sword Gaiden: Dance of the Maple Leaves (The story happened in Warring States period of China)
- Xuan-Yuan Sword III: Mists Beyond the Mountains (The story happened around the time of the An Lushan Rebellion. The protagonist started from Venice, Italy, and crossed the entire Eurasian continent to reach Chang'an, the capital of the Tang dynasty of China)
  - Xuan-Yuan Sword III Gaiden: The Scar of Sky (The story happened in late Sui dynasty)
- Xuan-Yuan Sword IV: The Black Dragon Dances as the Storm Rages (The story happened in the late Qin dynasty)
  - Xuan-Yuan Sword Gaiden: The Millennial Destiny (Part of the story happened in the Spring and Autumn period of China, in the 6th century BC, and the other part 1000 years later, during the Battle of Fei River, during the East Jin dynasty)
- Xuan-Yuan Sword V: A Sword Above the Clouds and the Sentiments of Shanhai (The story happened in an alternate world called the world of Shanhai, or literally the world of the Classic of Mountains and Seas. The time is equivalent to late Three Kingdoms period in our world)
  - Xuan-Yuan Sword Gaiden: The Cloud of Han (The story happened in the period of Three Kingdoms of China)
  - Xuan-Yuan Sword Gaiden: The Clouds Faraway (The game consists of 3 chapters: the main chapter, the chapter of Lan Ying, and the chapter of Wuzhang Plains. The story happened in the period of Three Kingdoms.)
- Xuan-Yuan Sword VI: The Phoenix Soars over Millennial Clouds (The story happened in the West Zhou dynasty)
  - Xuan-Yuan Sword Gaiden: The Gate of Firmament (The story happened in the Shang dynasty)
- Xuan-Yuan Sword VII (The story happened in the late West Han dynasty)

=== Xuan-Yuan Sword ===
(Chinese: 軒轅劍, literally "Xuan-Yuan Sword")

In the beginning of the world, the goddess Nüwa created two kinds of intelligent life: those of men, and those of monsters, who warred among each other all the time. The Sword was created by men in an attempt to end the everlasting war. Led by a single heroic figure, Xuan-yuan Swordsman (軒轅劍俠) who wielded the Sword, the war between humans and monsters ended with both sides suffering heavy casualties. Seventeen years later, the main character, He Ran (何然), a young swordsman left his mentor to set off on a journey into the chaotic world to carve his own path.

The first game in the series, Xuan-Yuan Sword was also Softstar's first RPG product and was released in 1990. The time period the game is set in is ambiguous. The game features a Dragon Quest-like user interface. Players started the game as a novice adventurer with minimal fighting skills and can gain combat experience through battles to enable progression to other areas and advance the plot. The main characters were named after the characters from A Chinese Ghost Story in this game, but their names were retconned in the second game.

The game featured standard VGA 16-colored 640x480 screen, complete with party-members, round-based combat, full-screen sprite animation, various monsters, Chinese-styled AdLb music, sound effects, animated spell effects, as well as full Chinese interface, which was a great hit in Taiwan's computer game market at that period.

Released on October 13, 1990.

=== Xuan-Yuan Sword II ===
(Chinese: 軒轅劍貳, literally "Xuan-Yuan Sword 2")

Continuing from where the first game left off, He Ran (何然), together with the vigilante Yang Kunshuo (楊坤碩) and the young thaumaturge Jiang Ruhong (江如紅), defeated the dreaded incarnation of the Flaming Phoenix (火鳳凰) (the sinister monster who kidnapped Jiang), befriended a benevolent fox spirit Gu Yuesheng (古月聖), and traveled back in time to find He Ran's parents. They sought to bring about the end of the leader of the invasive monsters, known as the Wicked God (惡神), Bashe, and eventually confronted the treacherous Spirit of the Vessel.

Released on February 8, 1994.

Features
Many key features of the game series were introduced with this game. It was set in 320×240 256-colored screen (in the once-popular VGA X-mode). In-game artworks such as scenes, monsters, character portraits, items were fashioned in Chinese painting style.

Monster Fusion Vessel
Another key feature is the Vessel system. Not long after the beginning of the game, the Monster Fusion Vessel can be acquired, and has two main functions:

1. Absorb enemies encountered in battle, with limitations:
  - Cannot absorb creatures that have higher experience level than player, and those creatures whose levels are close to the players' are more easily captured when wounded.
  - Bosses creatures and human enemies cannot be absorbed.
  - Imprisoned monsters are visible in players inventory and can be summoned to assist during battle with a stamina cost.
2. Transmutation. A player can transmute creatures and items to other objects or creatures. The resulting product may be exceedingly powerful or unobtainable otherwise.

The Sword
In the battle against the final boss, the Vessel Spirit, the goddess Nüwa appeared and revealed the truth that Xuan-Yuan Swordsman was He Ran's father whose spirit has fused with the Xuan-Yuan Sword. Receiving the powerful weapon from the goddess, the protagonist and his company went to the World Within the Vessel and defeated the treacherous Vessel Spirit, sealing him by planting the Xuan-Yuan Sword in his head.

This installment also introduced a recurring element of the series, the DOMO Studio that is present in all future games in vastly different incarnations that players can visit to access humorous fourth wall-breaking dialogue, quests, and items.

=== Xuan-Yuan Sword III: Mists Beyond the Mountains ===
(Chinese: 軒轅劍參：雲和山的彼端, literally "Xuan-Yuan Sword 3: Beyond Clouds and Mountains"; released in English as Xuan-Yuan Sword: Mists Beyond the Mountains)

The story opens in Venice with Septem (賽特), a Frankish knight and covert intelligence operative of mixed descent from Gaul who was the lieutenant to Pepin the Younger. Septem possessed an heirloom bronze vessel with an eastern design, which was in fact the Monster Fusion Vessel. He had heterochromic pupils of blue and brown, garnering discrimination and distrust from his peers and fellow knights over his somewhat Eastern appearance. Miles (麥爾斯) (the reincarnation of Satan whose memories and innate powers had not yet been fully awakened), a knight-commander under the guidance of the cleric Cornelius (康那里士) (the Dread Lord of Hell in disguise), was the polar opposite of his rival Septem, enforcing the Church's will without mercy and question, executing those designated as heretics without hesitation, and had the affection of Lilian (莉蓮), a pure maiden Septem had courted in vain. Pepin himself, however, favored Septem, and gave him a quest of great import. He was to go to the East, and find the way to achieve Absolute Victory/the Way of the King. During the journey, a simpleminded demoness named Nicole (妮可) joined Septem after being summoned by a strange dying man Septem tried to help, as an agent sent by Satan. Her mission was to awaken Septem's memory of his past life, in which he was Lucifer's most trusted ally who took part in Lucifer's Rebellion, and to convert him to Satan's cause once more, accompanied with promises of wealth, power, and demonic servants, but she eventually abandoned her mission over the fondness she developed for Septem. Kama, a self-proclaimed spirit of love, and Ankh, a snarky talking flying Egyptian black cat accompanying Kama (both of whom Septem encountered in the Tadmor Tombs), as well as Li Jing (李靖), a Chinese mortal-turned-deity who oversaw the establishment of the Tang dynasty, whose reincarnated self, Master Huiyan, previously accompanied Septem for a short time before sacrificing himself in an attempt to stop a war between the Abbasid Caliphate (which recently overthrew Umayyad rule) and Tang (which ended in the defeat of the Tang forces led by Gao Xianzhi), also joined the party. Septem also met his eventual wife, Widad (薇達), a military leader who defied Arabian patriarchal traditions and who was the reincarnated spirit twin of Kama, and the young grandson of Al-Kindi, whom Septem studied under for a short time around the time of the Abbasid Revolution, as well as Wang Siyue (王思月), a willful young woman from Chang'an with feelings for Septem, along his journey. After finally reaching China and encountering a variety of conflicts, including the An Lushan Rebellion, the group discovered Satan's plan to subjugate all worlds by using the Reversal of Mandala Ritual (反曼陀羅陣), which Septem's past incarnation invented and gained time traversal powers from, to modify the natural laws of causality, and managed to foil it with the assistance of The Immortal of Xuan-yuan Sword (the avatar of the Xuan-Yuan Sword who takes on the form of a stern and wise old man). After Satan's defeat, Septem married Widad, returned to assist Charlemagne with lessons from his journey-that a ruler must rule in the best interests of the commonfolk, and the way to ensure victory lies in the prevention and cessation of conflicts, and later reunited with Nicole, who was reborn once more as a normal girl by the grace of Heaven.

The game eschews turn-based battles for the Active Time Battle combat system, an unusual feature in Chinese RPGs. The refining system in the game has two categories of items and creatures, Eastern and Western, which allows for the creation of different items based on altar selection.

The game was released on December 4, 1999. An iOS port of the game with additional storylines and scenes meant to expand the portion of the game set in China was released on January 17, 2017. This version was later rereleased digitally with numerous enhancements on PC and Nintendo Switch in 2023.

=== Xuan-Yuan Sword IV: The Black Dragon Dances as the Storm Rages ===
(Chinese: 軒轅劍肆：黑龍舞兮雲飛揚, literally "Xuan-Yuan Sword 4: The Black Dragon Dances! The Clouds Fly)

This game is the fourth installment of the main series. The game is the first to be presented in 3D, both in environment and in combat. The story starts with an orphaned girl from the late Zhao state, Shui Jing (水鏡) and her senior disciple-sister, Qu Xian (屈嫻) on the top of a mountain with their seniors from the House of Mo, a Mohist clan actively opposing the tyranny of Qin and its leader, who is often accompanied by a mysterious purple-skinned adviser (later revealed to be the original Vessel Spirit on an ideological mission to create an unified utopia by absorbing the mortal world into the universe created by the Spirit - "Realm in the Clouds"). Qu Xian witnessed her companions being murdered by giant mechanical constructs created with the Jiguan technique. Later, Shui Jing meets with Ji Liang (姬良) (later known as Zhang Liang 張良), a well-educated young man from the annihilated Han state who can utilize the Scroll of Heaven (Tian Shu 天書) in battles after obtaining and deciphering it in an early escapade with Shui Jing, and Ji Peng (疾鵬), a humorous talking bird king who employs a humanoid Jiguan body in battle. The three journey across various lands to combat the machinations of the Qin Empire and the Vessel Spirit. Later in the story, Ji Peng is revealed to be the bird owned by the Mo clan leader's husband, Fu Ziche (輔子徹) (introduced in Dance of Maple along with the current Mo leader, Lady Wenjin (紋錦), renowned for her eternal youthfulness), who had been sealed in ice in the World Within the Vessel after a battle with the Vessel Spirit during which he averted disaster by preventing the Black Fire the Vessel Spirit unleashed using a purple crystal in desperation from taking form. The trio eventually reconcile their differences with the Spirit, rescued Fu Ziche, and confronted the true threat, battling with all nine portions of Black Fire (with each portion increasing its power and all nine portions 4^128 times as powerful as one portion alone) running amok, which is believed to be the ultimate weapon of the Hell that can take the form of a black dragon, discovered long ago using purple crystals by the ancient Shu kingdom engineer Qi, who caused the destruction of his civilization and was sealed away in a protective cocoon until the events of the game, when he took control of Lady Wenjin (who was created with Black Fire) and Black Fire to go on a rampage to destroy the world (or in his mind, creating a world where hell and the mortal realm co-existed in order to eliminate death) upon awakening.

Released on the August 4, 2002.

=== Xuan-Yuan Sword V: A Sword Above the Clouds and the Sentiments of the World of Shanhai ===
(Chinese: 軒轅劍伍：一劍凌雲山海情, literally "Xuan-Yuan Sword 5: A Sword Soaring Above Clouds; Shanhai Sentiments")

The main character Lu Chengxuan (陸承軒) killed his parents as a result of not being able control his mysterious power, and was about to die in the wilderness as an outcast when he was coincidentally brought to the World of Shanhai through a portal created by Huangfu Muyun (皇甫暮雲), a powerful wielder of sword energy and the avatar of the Xuanyuan Sword, using the Pangu Axe. There, he encounters Xia Rou (夏柔), second empress of the Kingdom of Women. The two traveled around the world, meeting with people from other kingdoms, and set out to accomplish a task given to them by the Elder of the Green Dragon Kingdom, leading to a confrontation with the exiled Princess of Heaven, Qing'er (青兒), who helped the Yellow Emperor, Ji Xuanyuan (姬軒轅), claim the mortal world for humans and was banished due to her newly acquired form causing cataclysmic droughts after expending her power in aiding him in reforging the sword that would later be known as the Xuan Yuan Sword.

Released on August 4, 2006.

=== Xuan-Yuan Sword VI: The Phoenix Soars over Millennial Clouds ===
(Chinese: 軒轅劍陸：鳳凌長空千載雲, literally "Xuan-Yuan Sword 6: The Fenghuang Rising High Above the Sky and Thousand-year Clouds")

In c. 1046 BCE, the Battle of Muye erupted. The leader of the Zhou of the west, Ji Fa, took the opportunity presented when Di Xin rallied his forces in a southeastern expedition and when the Shang capital of Zhaoge was undefended to form an alliance with leaders in the west at Mengjin to perform a swift strike against the capital.

Hearing of the impending attack, the Shang king was caught off guard and forced to head to Muye for battle, and ended up burning himself alive on the Deer Terrace Pavilion, thus ending the six-hundred-year reign of the Shang dynasty and ushering in the era of the Zhou dynasty.

After the Battle of Muye, the tense atmosphere remained between the Shang and Zhou people. The Shang remnant forces retreated to the largest vassal state in the east, Yan (奄國), for a respite until a chance for rebellion arose. Di Xin's son, Wu Geng, was held at Zhaoge. King Wu of Zhou (formerly known as Ji Fa) assigned land and title to him, but ordered his three younger brothers to keep Wu Geng confined and under surveillance to prevent rebellion. With the passing of King Wu from illness, the Duke of Zhou who served as a royal advisor was accused of attempting to seize the throne, and had to resign to prove his innocence, causing the kingdom to be leaderless and the political situation to become volatile. The Shang sought to seize this chance to attack Haojing to reclaim the kingdom. A war between the east and west appears to be imminent, and at the same time, a mysterious force stirs in the dark.

The game opens with a cinematic of a battle between Xia and Shang forces at the Xia capital Zhenxun that concludes with the end of the Xia dynasty and the deaths of two Xia lovers, the warrior Si Tianjia (姒天甲) and the priestess Miao Ji (苗姬). The two promise each other to transmigrate as enemies of Shang to oppose it together in their next lives. As they lay dying, a Xia artifact, the Holy Circlet of Tianhuan carried by Miao Ji splits into two halves and merges with Si Tianjia and Miao Ji.

The story focuses on the conflict among the reigning Zhou and the subordinate Shang states. The main character, Feng Tianling (鳳天凌), is a proud young Shang noble raised in Yan who can see and communicate with spirits and supernatural creatures. A benevolent spirit, Hupo (琥珀 Amber), has been his friend and companion since he was young. He sets out on a journey of self-discovery and encounters companions and enemies alike along the way amidst growing omens of war. Feng Tianling's companions are Huyue (瑚月), a beautiful maiden from a mysterious tribe who is attached to Tianling because of a supposedly destined marriage, Ji Ting (姬亭), the Zhou princess skilled in archery who values bravery and prowess, Jialanduo/Kalandra (迦蘭多), a Shendu royal with chakra manipulation skills who is searching for his sister, and Rong Shuang (蓉霜), a young Black Fire Sect disciple from Shu on a mission with her fellows to recover their cultural artifact, Black Fire.

The DLC Chapter of Zhuo Shanzhu (濁山鑄篇), released as a free update, features a story involving Zhuo Shanzhu (濁山鑄), the elder brother of Rong Shuang previously presumed to be dead, and his investigation of the nature of Black Fire, the Black Fire Sect, and the history and technology of the lost kingdom of Sanmu.

=== Xuan-Yuan Sword VII ===
At the end the Western Han dynasty, Wang Mang, the regent of Han, seized the imperial throne and established the Xin dynasty. During this time, various auspicious signs as well as ominous phenomenons, such as the unearthing of a stone bovine and a white stone carved with writing, and the discovery of ancient tombs were prevalent.

A peculiar bamboo scroll was unearthed from the tomb of the Marquis of Liu, and was swiftly delivered to the court astrologer. Unexpectedly, on the night the scroll was received, a fire broke out, and all within the court astrologer residence perished. The scroll also vanished without a trace.

Ten years had gone by, but the prosperous era foretold by the mysterious omens did not come to pass. Numerous natural disasters tormented the commonfolk, and many rose up in rebellion. Just then, the scroll that disappeared more than a decade ago resurfaced, ushering in a turbulent time anew.

== Tales (Gaiden) titles ==
=== Xuan-Yuan Sword Gaiden: Dance of the Maple Leaves ===
(Chinese: 軒轅劍外傳：楓之舞, literally "Xuan-Yuan Sword Side Story: Dance of Maple")

The first standalone expansion episode in the series, the story of Dance of the Maple Banners (楓之舞) was based on the Warring States period in Chinese History. The Sword fell into the hands of the political radical, Shusangzi (蜀桑子 or Sang Jing 桑凈). The main character Fu Ziche (輔子徹) is an eccentric young disciple of Mozi, and is also an expert in mechanical engineering, especially in the creation and manipulation of Jiguan Ren (機關人), man-sized mechanical golems powered by mystic energy. Jiguan Ren were originally developed for war, but their designs were hidden away for fear of being misused. Shusangzi had re-discovered this technology, and developed a large Jiguan army for his own ends. Upon learning of this, Mozi sent Fu Ziche to investigate, and if possible, to stop Shusangzi. On his quest, he encountered Wenjin (紋錦), the estranged daughter of Sang created with the aid of the power of the Vessel, and they eventually fell in love.

Being the first game in the series to have connection with real world history, Dance of the Maple Banners inherited most of the previous game's interface, arts, and battle system, with subtle modifications, and wrapped with new plot. More realistic ancient war machines were made alive, while historical figures such as Mozi, Lu Ban, Sun Bin, could be encountered in the game.

As were the cases with most other standalone tales titles, players do not have the chance to wield the Sword. In this game the Sword is in Shu Sangzi's possession, and is used against players. In the final battle, Shu uses a move called Xuan-Yuan Sword Technique (軒轅劍法), which inflicts serious damage to the player party.

Released on January 6, 1995.

=== Xuan-Yuan Sword III Gaiden: The Scar of Sky ===
(Chinese: 軒轅劍參外傳：天之痕, literally "Xuan-Yuan Sword 3 Side Story: The Scar of the Sky")

Set in the era of the Sui dynasty, 150 years prior to the events of Xuan-Yuan Sword 3, this game addressed several loose threads in Xuan-Yuan Sword 3.

The main character is a young man named Chen Jingchou (陳靖仇, meaning "To pacify the northern foes and to avenge Chen."), the only royal descendant remaining from the decimated Chen dynasty. The final attempt for counterattack from the Chen family happened several years before Chen Jingchou was born, when the tens-of-thousands-strong remnants of Chen forces were single-handedly wiped out by a 10-year-old Sui child, Yang Tuo (楊拓) (later known as Yuwen Tuo 宇文拓), a student of Yang Su.

Having lived under the reign of those who destroyed his kingdom, Chen Jingchou had been educated by his mentor, Chen Fu (陳輔), to pursue a life of vengeance and of reviving his kingdom. The first step of their journey to restore Chen was to acquire the Mirror of Kunlun, one of the Ten Great Ancient Artifacts.

The ancient monstrosity Taotie was released from a mirror that was revealed to be a fake. In order to protect Jingchou, Fu trapped himself with Taotie using a potent Silk of Ice spell, and instructed Jingchou to embark at once to find a way to save him, as well as finding information concerning other Artifacts. As he set out on his journey, Jingchou summoned an elemental spirit familiar given to him by his master to accompany him on his journeys.

Jingchou later was later joined by Yu Xiaoxue (于小雪), a white haired girl showing unusual healing magic potential, the honorable half Göktürks-blooded hero Zhang Lie (張烈) and Zhang's young sister-in-law Tuoba Yu'er (拓拔玉兒) of the Tuoba tribe, which kept the Shennong Ding for generations and was subject to indiscriminate slaughter by the Sui emperor's troops. During their expedition in collecting the Artifacts, they encountered several Blood Rituals of Ten Thousand Souls, rites conducted by Grand Preceptor Yuwen Tuo which involved the killing of ten thousand souls to gather their essences into a single Blood Pearl. The party attempted to intervene with the rituals, but Yuwen Tuo proved to be too formidable a foe. Thus they adopted the strategy of subterfuge, hampering his every effort to collect the Blood Pearls without direct confrontations, and was even helped in secret by a young princess named Dugu Ningke (獨孤寧珂), who held tremendous political power due to her relation with her uncle, the emperor, and protested Yuwen's actions.

Eventually, their plan failed, and Yu Xiaoxue was held as a hostage by Tuo in exchange for the Artifacts that Jingchou's party had collected, namely the Shennong Ding, the Seal of Kongtong, the Pangu Axe, the Nüwa Stone, and the Kunlun Mirror. Jingchou complied, yet Tuo discarded the Stone and the mirror as fakes, proclaiming that he himself was actually the human avatar of the Kunlun Mirror. Surprisingly, Yu Xiaoxue refused to leave with Jingchou, stating that she intended to stay and help Tuo's project, and seemingly betrays his trust by repelling his attack on Yuwen's plans wielding the Xuan-Yuan Sword. Losing all hope, Jingchou gave up his quest and opted to travel with his similarly disheartened mentor.

Ningke, who was actually a demon general dispatched from the western pantheon of Hell, was displeased with this turn of events. She infiltrated China by possessing the original Princess Dugu who died of illness, and arrived in anticipation of what was calculated to be the time a comet named Crimson Piercer (Chi Guan - 赤貫) would pass through the sky, opening a rift in the divine protective barrier of the Chinese lands and allowing an opportunity for demons from the West to invade. Tuo learned of the implications of the passage of the comet, and set out to collect five of the Artifacts in order to seal the rift the comet would cause in the Barrier of the Ninth Heaven in the firmament above Shenzhou. However, several of the five Artifacts required for the Ritual of Mending were nowhere to be found. Ningke proposed that he substitute these with Blood Pearls along with the construction of a Tower of Babel, and a Pentagram ritual formation. In order to save the Chinese world, using his power, his riches and his relation with the Emperor Yang, Tuo managed to accomplish these despite his moral misgivings. In the process, Tuo also discovered that Xiaoxue was actually the avatar of the Stone of Nüwa, as Artifacts resonate with each other when in close proximity. Consequently, he told her of his plan and convinced her to help him, leading to misunderstandings between her and Jingchou.

Ningke could not allow the Ritual to be abandoned and manipulated Jingchou through treachery by murdering Yu'er, who learned the truth behind the situation after going to the Grand Preceptor Residence in secret in an attempt to reconcile Xiaoxue and Jingchou, and framing Xiaoxue and Tuo. Fueled by anger and grief, Jingchou's party managed to reach the top of the Tower of Babel, where they were beaten once again by Tuo. Ningke suddenly appeared in the confusion and seized Xiaoxue as hostage to divert Tuo's attention. Jingchou took the opportunity and severed Tuo's arm. Ningke then revealed her true demon form, imprisoning Tuo with magic. Unable to mend the sky, the Chinese world fell under Satan's rule of death and destruction.

Days later, under the instruction of the now immortal He Ran and Gu Yuesheng (last seen in Xuan-Yuan Sword 2), Jingchou's group, which now also includes a young Li Shimin successfully retrieved the Artifacts from Ningke's handmaidens in the bloodied world, and returned to the Tower. They defeated Ningke with her full unrestricted power, and rescued Tuo. Having the Artifacts at hand, Jingchou and company invoked the Ritual of Reversal (which is also named the Ritual of Loss, 失卻之陣) at the top of Tower of Babel, which, utilizing the power of Tuo as the avatar the Mirror of Kunlun at the ritual formation's center, reversed time and brought the party back to the moment prior to the passing of Chi Guan.

The group invoked the Ritual of Trespass (also called the Ritual of Babel), sending them above the sky, and arrived at Chi Guan itself. Coming across the Heavenly Maiden White Jade Ring (天女白玉輪), an eight trigrams formation used by the deities Fuxi and Nüwa to revive their deceased daughter in ancient times, Jingchou had the choice to bring Yu'er back to life at the cost of expending a great deal of Xiaoxue's power. At the heart of the meteor, where the party prepared to cast the Ritual of Sealing, which caused the non-artifact casters to lose their most precious memories or ideals (with Zhang Lie losing his ambition of unifying the lands, Li Shimin losing his love for his family, and Jingchou losing his memories of Yu'er or his master depending on the ending), Ningke, then still alive and ignorant of the recent events Jingchou and his companions experienced, appeared and attempted to continue her deception, but a fight ensued, and Ningke was vanquished. The party decided to grant her final wishes: to be returned to her homeland, and to become free to love whom she loves. Gu stated that was impossible due to her demonic nature, and placed her soul into the Fuxi Qin (伏羲琴), which Yuwen Tuo brought with him on his self-imposed exile to the west, Ningke's homeland, after the events of the game for her soul to be cleansed eventually.

Chen Fu witnessed what appeared to be Jingchou assisting in the machinations of Yuwen Tuo, their sworn enemy. Ningke exploited this before heading to Chi Guan by giving Chen Fu the Fruit of Satan, a demonic object that grants power in exchange for sanity, deceiving him into battling against his student. Chen Fu soon arrived at the heart of Chi Guan with the intent to destroy it. Jingchou's group was left with no choice but to kill Chen Fu to save the world.

Several decades later, Ningke was reborn as Nicole, a demon cleansed of evil, while Septem was born to a descendant of Tuo in western lands.

The Magic System is revamped in this game. All magics now belong to one of the five elements of metal, wood, water, fire, and earth (金木水火土) in Chinese mythology.

The game was released on December 2, 2000. A television series based from the game, produced by Chinese Entertainment Shanghai Limited, starring Hu Ge and Cecilia Liu, aired in 2012.

An iOS port of the game was released on April 8, 2014.

=== Xuan-Yuan Sword Gaiden: The Millennial Destiny ===
(Chinese: 軒轅劍外傳：蒼之濤, literally "Xuan-Yuan Sword Side Story: Billows of the Bleak")

The game opens with an alternate version of the Battle of Fei River, a battle between Former Qin and Eastern Jin. It concludes with Eastern Jin's surrender to Former Qin. Former Qin merged with Eastern Jin and united the entirety of China.

Set within the Spring and Autumn period, the story is told from the perspective of an orphaned girl, Che Yun (車芸), whose family was framed by a corrupt official and executed. She was spared from execution due to her age, but her legs were amputated as punishment. Che Yun was talented in the art of Mujia - a technique of creating and manipulating constructs of magnets and wooden machinery, which are lightweight yet powerful, with her late grandfather as her inspiration. She fashioned herself wooden prosthetic legs and managed to craft a lifelike and agile wooden fox that can be used in various tasks such as transportation and battle, Yunhu (雲狐), after much effort and coming across rare materials. She was a close friend with Huan Yuanzhi (桓遠之), whom Che Yun saved from drowning and who assisted her in creating Yunhu with exotic components. Che Yun later encountered Ying Shi (嬴詩) (who is reincarnation of Che Yun except that Ying was from a different era and was named Murong Shi - 慕容詩). With Che Yun as a common link, Huan and Ying formed a grudging alliance and adventured together, coming into conflicts with the Jin Kingdom's Tai Chen Gong, a priest organization focused on increasing its power and influence, and Heralds of the Seven Luminaries (七曜使者 "Qiyao Shizhe"), a group of powerful rebels from a bleak future timeline sent back with the help of the student of the then-deceased Spirit of the Vessel. At the culmination of the story, Che, Ying and Huan reached the deepest chamber of the Realm of Haotian containing the wheel that determines the destiny of and relationship between all things, Wheel of Taiyi (太一之輪 "Taiyi Zhi Lun"). However, Murong and Huan were both duty-bound to set history on diverging courses in favor of their homelands. Che intended to stop Huan from changing the future despite Murong having decided against intervening with history by ordering Yunhu to push Huan away. However, Huan wielded the Xuan-Yuan Sword and injured Che fatally by accident while repelling Yunhu. The gate to the palace then closed abruptly. Murong, unable to extract her friends was transported out of the gate, leaving Huan and Che in the room where Huan, immortal due to the power of his surroundings, mourned in regret for a thousand years. At the instant of Che Yun's death, Murong realized their link and inherited the knowledge of Mujia. She entered the gate when it next opened in a thousand years after she returned to the future in which Jin overcame Qin to fight for the welfare of the common-folk, encountering a sorrowful aged Huan and offering forgiveness and acceptance as Che Yun would have.

Released on February 6, 2004.

On December 3, 2015, an animated series inspired by the game called Xuan Yuan Sword Luminary (軒轅劍：蒼之曜 / Ken En Ken: Aoki Kagayaki, literally "Xuan-Yuan Sword: Lights of the Bleak") was announced as a collaborative project with TV Tokyo and Studio Deen and began airing on October 2, 2018, in mainland China, Taiwan, as well as Japan.

=== Xuan-Yuan Sword Gaiden: The Cloud of Han ===
(Chinese: 軒轅劍外傳：漢之雲, literally "Xuan-Yuan Sword Side Story: The Clouds of Han") Released on December 19, 2007.

The game is set in the era of the Three Kingdoms, Wei, Shu and Wu and feature famous historic figures. Zhuge Liang, the chancellor of the kingdom of Shu had engaged on multiple northward military expeditions with little success. On Zhuge Liang's Third Expedition, a secret military group called "Fei Yu" (飛羽)(meaning Flying Feather, deriving its name from the two famous generals of Shu kingdom - Zhang Fei and Guan Yu)carried out various missions in the war to further the interests of Shu. However, on the Fourth Expedition, Thanks to its own group of powerful secret operatives, Wei was able to discover and exploit critical weaknesses of Shu, prompting The Feathers to take action. The game addresses issues of loyalty and duty, as well as the harsh realities of warfare and peace.

A live-action television series based on the game has been released.

=== Xuan-Yuan Sword Gaiden: The Clouds Faraway ===
(Chinese: 軒轅劍外傳：雲之遙, literally "Xuan-Yuan Sword Side Story: The Clouds Faraway") Released on January 12, 2010.

The Clouds Faraway, also set in the era of the Three Kingdoms, is presented with a contrasting viewpoint to the Han Clouds. The main character, Xu Muyun (徐暮雲), was adopted by Xu Shu and raised in the Kingdom of Wei. Muyun grew up with his childhood friends Lanyin (蘭茵) and Zhang Gao (張誥) in the house of Zhang He, and the three youngsters vowed to fight for their homeland and bring about prosperous days together. Through his journey, Muyun came to a new level of maturity, learned of his true identity, realized the meaning of duty and friendship, and witnessed the ruthlessness of war.

The story is continued after the main game in three DLC chapters, released to enrich the story. These three chapters are: The Chapter of Wuzhang Plains: Muyun (Chinese: 五丈原暮雲篇), The Chapter of Wuzhang Plains: Zhaoyun (Chinese: 五丈原朝雲篇), and the lengthy and critically acclaimed Chapter of Lan Yin (Chinese: 蘭茵篇).

=== Xuan-Yuan Sword Gaiden: The Gate of Firmament ===
(Chinese: 軒轅劍外傳：穹之扉, literally "Xuan-Yuan Sword Side Story: The Gate of the Heavens"; released in English as Xuan-Yuan Sword: The Gate of Firmament) Released on March 26, 2015.

In ancient times, the Heavenly Emperor opened the Gate of Firmament, connecting the Heavens and Earth. Mortals could ascend to the Gate to obtain divine power in order to assist in the search for the Emperor's missing daughter. Unscrupulous individuals took advantage of the Emperor's gesture, and caused the mortal world to descend into chaos. The lives of the common folk were filled with anxiety and weariness. The god Fuxi and the goddess Nüwa took pity on the people, and along with Zhuanxu, convinced the Queen of Huaxu (華胥之主, based on Lady Huaxu 華胥氏) to close the Gate forcibly with great sacrifice. After this, no one could reach the Heavens through the Gate, and no god could go to the mortal world; thus came about the Isolation of the Heavens and Earth (Jueditiantong 絕地天通). Time passed, and the mortal realm suffered due to disasters and endless conflicts over claims to rule, embroiled in political instability and riotous events. At this time of unrest and warfare, a Heavenly entity descends, adding to the unsolved mysteries of the troubled world.

The story revolves the journeys and adventures of Sikong Yu (司空宇), a young man whose goal is to protect his nomadic Youxiong village (有熊村), which consists of descendants of the Yellow Emperor, Muyue (沐月), a mysterious woman claiming to be from the legendary Kingdom of Huaxu (華胥) whose distant behavior makes her seem unapproachable, Feng Yu (鳳煜), a jovial and cunning traveler with ties to royal House of Shang, and Zi Qiao (子巧), a royal high priestess of the Zi Kingdom who is betrothed to the Shang prince and possesses tremendous strength as well as an insatiable appetite. Together, they fight to bring the nefarious plots of a mysterious group of conspirators consisting of the followers of Gong Gong (共工), the water god who had been sealed away for his violent actions, led by his second-in-command Xiang Liu (相柳), as well as Qing Yu (青榆), the avatar of the World Tree Jian Mu (建木) who has been driven by hatred for humans and vengeance against those of the Xuan-Yuan bloodline as well as his former lover Lan Ling (藍鈴), to an end before ruin befalls the world.

Three free DLC packs have been released as game patches, including the Chapter of the All-encompassing (萬象之篇), the Chapter of Gods and Demons/Chapter of Saviors (神魔之篇), and the Chapter of the Watchful Vigil (守望之篇), which add side quests, stories, and hidden endings to the game.

On September 10, 2015, a multi-language version of the game was placed on Steam Greenlight, the game has since been Greenlit and has been released in English, Japanese, simplified Chinese and traditional Chinese. It is the first core title (main and tales) in the series to see an English release. A PlayStation 4 port as well as an Xbox One version of the game have been released.

== Spin-off titles ==
=== Xuan-Yuan Demonbane Chronicles ===
(Chinese: 軒轅伏魔錄, literally "Xuan-Yuan Records of Subduing Demons") Released on February 10, 2001.

The humble sword-wielding Mo clan hero defeats demons to bring peace to the world. The Monster Fusion Vessel is an ancient artifact that can seal away monsters.

The Mo clan is a group of powerful and righteous vigilantes, protecting the Monster Fusion Vessel for generations. The story begins with a resounding wave of panic, with a catastrophe witnessed by the young hero Fu Zixun. With his clan destroyed, the Vessel lost, the common folk imperiled, and his benefactor murdered, the young man never expected a trip down the mountain to turn into a grueling journey to defeat demons. Facing deaths and the seeking vengeance, his youth and naiveté are buried only to be replaced by a heavy long sword and revenge weighing upon him. Together with the daughter of his benefactor, he begins his journey with uncertainty. Fortunately, the journey did not prove lonesome and he encountered a pampered daughter of a wealthy family who joined with bandits, a famous transport guard leader, a thief titled Flying on Grass, a legendary swordsman, a fox spirit from a mystic valley, and a simple boy leaving his House consisting of only himself. These people bear resentment, pain, anger, and hatred, yet gather under the common idea of righteousness to travel the world. The future holds many uncertainties, and their opponents have cunning schemes. The group does not even know where their path will end, so can only forge their way ahead little by little, encountering monsters causing disturbances as well as evil government officials mistreating commoners. "Just what kind of world is this?" The group can only ponder in disapproval, yet they share a belief that drives them forward-a belief in a beautiful future. Even though monsters threaten the world and heroes rise in response, but the outcome is still unknown. They can only rely on their companies' warmth to trudge through hardships together. All, with the appearance of the ancient weapon Xuan-Yuan Sword, shall eventually become clear.

This is an experimental strategy RPG utilizing 3D environments with 2D character sprites set in an alternate continuity to the core Xuan-Yuan Sword games, but still contains a few elements related to Xuan-Yuan Sword 3. The protagonist Fu Zixun (輔子洵) is a young man who goes on a journey after of his clan's destruction and the Monster Fusion Vessel's theft caused by Jiutian (九天), the malevolent entity the protagonist's younger clan sister Zhu Yuanyuan (朱媛沅) accidentally unleashed. On his journey, he encounters allies including Ding Yun (丁芸), the kind and trusting daughter of a renowned doctor, Jiang Wushuang (江無雙), a bossy young girl who ran away from home and leads a group of bandits she defeated, Zuo Zhenhe (左震河), a respected and mighty guard leader for transporting goods, Qiu Qianli (裘千里), a skilled but kind-hearted thief, Leng Zhongqiu (冷仲秋), a stoic hero with a dark past, Qise (七色), a fox spirit with a feminine human form who is the elder sister to Jiutian, and Liang Cuo (梁錯), a slightly bumbling young man from a secretive family known for skills in engineering and the occult.

== List of titles ==
- Main series:
  - Xuan-Yuan Sword (軒轅劍) (1990)
  - Xuan-Yuan Sword II (軒轅劍貳) (1994)
  - Xuan-Yuan Sword III: Mists Beyond the Mountains (軒轅劍參：雲和山的彼端) (1999)
  - Xuan-Yuan Sword IV: The Black Dragon Dances as the Storm Rages (軒轅劍肆：黑龍舞兮雲飛揚) (2002)
  - Xuan-Yuan Sword V: A Sword Above the Clouds and the Sentiments of Shanhai (軒轅劍伍：一劍凌雲山海情) (2006)
  - Xuan-Yuan Sword VI: The Phoenix Soars over Millennial Clouds (軒轅劍陸：鳳凌長空千載雲) (2013)
  - Xuan-Yuan Sword VII (軒轅劍柒) (2020)
- Tales (Gaiden) titles:
  - Xuan-Yuan Sword Gaiden: Dance of the Maple Leaves (軒轅劍外傳：楓之舞) (1995)
  - Xuan-Yuan Sword III Gaiden: The Scar of Sky (軒轅劍參外傳：天之痕) (2000)
  - Xuan-Yuan Sword Gaiden: The Millennial Destiny (軒轅劍外傳：蒼之濤) (2004)
  - Xuan-Yuan Sword Gaiden: The Cloud of Han (軒轅劍外傳：漢之雲) (2007)
  - Xuan-Yuan Sword Gaiden: The Clouds Faraway (軒轅劍外傳：雲之遙) (2010)
  - Xuan-Yuan Sword Gaiden: The Gate of Firmament (軒轅劍外傳：穹之扉) (2015)
- Spin-off titles:
  - Xuan-Yuan Demonbane Chronicles (軒轅伏魔錄) (2001)
  - Xuan-Yuan Sword Online: Chain of Life (軒轅劍網路版) (2002)
  - Dream of Mirror Online (飛天歷險：軒轅劍網路版二代) (2005)
  - The Scar of Sky Online (天之痕 OL) (2010)
  - Flying PuPu (飛天噗噗) (2011)
  - Xuan-Yuan Sword Gaiden Online (軒轅劍外傳 Online) (2012)
  - Battle Legends (伏魔傳奇) (2012)
  - Mirror of Sanctity (崑崙鏡) (2012)
  - Xuan-Yuan Sword 7 Online (軒轅劍七) (Canceled)
  - Xuan-Yuan Legends of Gods and Demons (軒轅神魔傳) (2013)
  - Spell Card Xuan-Yuan (符卡軒轅) (2014)
  - Vochord: Xuan-Yuan Sword Rhythm Game (Vochord 轩辕天籁) (2017)
  - Chronicles of Xuan-Yuan Heroes (軒轅劍群俠錄) (2018)
  - Xuan-Yuan Sword: The Dragon Dances Among Clouds and Mountains (軒轅劍龍舞雲山) (2019)
  - Xuan-Yuan Sword Luminary (軒轅劍蒼之曜) (2019)
  - Xuan-Yuan Sword Origins (軒轅劍劍之源) (2020)
- Spin-off media:
  - Xuan-Yuan Sword: Scar of the Sky (軒轅劍之天之痕) (2012) - A two-volume novel written by Yan Leisheng (燕壘生) based on Xuan-Yuan Sword III Gaiden: The Scar of Sky.
  - Xuan-Yuan Sword: Scar of Sky (軒轅劍之天之痕) (2012) - A live-action television series based on Xuan-Yuan Sword III Gaiden: The Scar of Sky.
  - The Music of Xuan-Yuan Sword (軒轅劍歷代音樂集：劍詠軒轅) (2014) - A collection of music from the series.
  - Xuan-Yuan Sword Gaiden: The Millennial Destiny (軒轅劍外傳：蒼之濤) (2016) - A novel adaptation of the game of the same name.
  - Xuan-Yuan Sword: The Cloud of Han (軒轅劍之漢之雲) (2017) - A live-action television series based on Xuan-Yuan Sword Gaiden: The Cloud of Han.
  - Xuan Yuan Sword Luminary (軒轅劍：蒼之曜) (2018) - An animated television series inspired by Xuan-Yuan Sword Gaiden: The Millennial Destiny.

== See also ==
- Xuan-Yuan Sword: Scar of Sky
- The Legend of Sword and Fairy, an iconic and equally prolific video game series also developed by Softstar.
