= The Liquidator (2017 film) =

2017 Chinese-Hong Kong film by Xu Jizhou

- Directed by: Xu Jizhou
- Screenplay by: Xu Jizhou
- Based on: Evil Minds: City Light by Lei Mi
- Produced by: Bill Kong; Ren Zhonglun
- Starring: Deng Chao; Ethan Juan; Liu Shishi
- Production companies: Edko Films; Shanghai Film Group
- Distributed by: Edko Films Ltd
- Release date: 22 December 2017
- Countries: China; Hong Kong
- Language: Mandarin

The Liquidator (Chinese: 心理罪：城市之光 or 心理罪之城市之光) is a 2017 crime thriller film directed by Xu Jizhou and starring Deng Chao, Ethan Juan, and Liu Shishi. The film is a Chinese-Hong Kong co-production, and premiered in China on 22 December 2017.

It is based on the novel Evil Minds: City Light written by Lei Mi. It is the second film starring the crime investigator Fang Mu; Guilty of Mind, released in August 2017, is based on another of Lei Mi's novels, Guilty of Mind: Portrait.

== Plot ==
Criminal psychologist Fang Mu and forensic fingerprint expert Mi Nan work together to track down a serial killer who targets people who have been acquitted of notable crimes and uses their guilt as his modus operandi.

== Cast ==
- Deng Chao as Fang Mu
  - Wang Kaiyi as young Fang Mu
- Ethan Juan as Jiang Ya
- Liu Shishi as Mi Nan
- Karena Lam as Wei Wei
- Guo Jingfei as Ren Chuan
- Lei Mi
- Vicky Chen as Liao Yafan
- He Hongshan as Qi Yuan

== Reception ==
Screen Daily wrote,

Sadly, though, Deng’s concentrated effort to add a serious protagonist with franchise potential to his repertoire is hindered by writer-director Xu Zihou’s adaptation, which flaunts its protagonist’s genius but provides little sense of what really makes Fang Mu tick ... Hurried editing sacrifices suspense to cram in a succession of twists, while the ‘pulse pounding’ electronic score is so standardised that it ends up doing the exact opposite, and several CGI explosions are laughably cheap looking.

Derek Elley also gave a lukewarm review, rating it 6/10 and writing on his website Sino-Cinema:

Zippily put together and peopled by suitably oddball characters, vigilante serial-killer procedural The Liquidator 心理罪之城市之光 is entertaining enough, if not very believable, fare for the first 90 minutes before completely going off the rails in the final half-hour.

It debuted in fourth place in China, behind Youth, Legend of the Demon Cat and Bleeding Steel, earning $22 million at the box office.

== Awards and nominations ==
Awards	Category	Recipient	Result	Ref.
23rd Huading Awards	Best Original Film Song	"City of Light (城市之光)"	Nominated	

== Home media ==
It is available on home media.
