= But Always =

2014 Chinese-Hong Kong film by Snow Zou

- Film poster
- Directed by: Snow Zou
- Screenplay by: Snow Zou; Lau Ho-leung; Zhang Buniu
- Produced by: Zhang Yibai
- Starring: Nicholas Tse; Gao Yuanyuan
- Cinematography: Li Bingqiang
- Edited by: Maurice Li; Zhang Jia
- Music by: Wang Zhiyi
- Production companies: Emperor Motion Pictures; Wanda Pictures; Dadi Century Film (Beijing) Co Ltd
- Release dates: 4 September 2014 (Hong Kong); 5 September 2014 (China)
- Running time: 106 minutes
- Countries: China; Hong Kong
- Language: Mandarin
- Box office: US$36,590,000

But Always (Chinese: 一生一世) is a 2014 romantic drama film directed by Snow Zou. A Chinese-Hong Kong co-production, the film was released on 4 and 5 September 2014 in Hong Kong and mainland China respectively.

== Plot ==
Anran and Yongyuan meet in 1982 in Beijing, when Anran transfers to Yongyuan's school. She is wealthier than her classmates who approach her with suspicion. The school bully assigns Yongyuan to follow Anran, which is a role that he happily accepts for the next 20 years. One sign of his devotion is that he can always recognise her footsteps.

Anran and Yongyuan bond as they share the common tragedy of losing their mother in the same earthquake. However, their mothers come from different backgrounds, as Yougyuan's was a peasant and Anran was a doctor. Yongyuan's guardian dies and his uncle takes him away. He's not allowed to say goodbye to Anran, a pattern that recurs as one or the other repeatedly vanishes.

A decade later, Yongyuan returns to Beijing and encounters Anran, who is now a pre-med student. Yongyuan gets involved in some shady business to raise money for Anran's post-graduate education. When she is ready to leave for Columbia University, he disappears again.

In Manhattan, Anran gets a new boyfriend. He is a petulant painter called Michael. She also works two part-time jobs in addition to her studies.

Yongyuan, who has gotten rich just so he can search for Anran, finds her through Michael's paintings of her. This leads to another photographed reunion. But the couple is torn apart twice more.

== Cast ==
- Nicholas Tse as 赵永远
- Gao Yuanyuan as 安然
- Du Haitao
- Alice Li
- Lam Suet
- Che Xiao
- Li Wenling
- Shi Pengyuan
- Shi Xinyi
- Qin Hao
- Anya Wu
- Tong Dawei as 安然的变态老师
- Jack Kao
- Zang Tianshuo

== Reception ==
By 28 September, it had earned ¥225.77 million at the Chinese box office.

== See also ==
- I Love That Crazy Little Thing, another film by the same director
