= Sara (2015 film) =

2015 Hong Kong film by Herman Yau

- Theatrical poster
- Directed by: Herman Yau
- Written by: Erica Li
- Produced by: Chapman To
- Starring: Charlene Choi; Simon Yam
- Cinematography: Joe Chan
- Edited by: Azrael Chung
- Music by: Mak Chun Hung
- Production companies: Rex Film Productions; Fox International Channels; Hong Kong Film Productions
- Distributed by: Emperor Motion Pictures
- Release date: 5 March 2015
- Running time: 94 minutes
- Country: Hong Kong
- Languages: Cantonese; English; Thai
- Budget: HK$10 million
- Box office: HK$18.1 million

Sara, formerly known as Que Sera Sera (Chinese: 雛妓), is a 2015 Hong Kong psychological thriller film directed by Herman Yau and starring Charlene Choi and Simon Yam. The film was released on March 5, 2015.

== Plot ==
After being sexually abused as a child by her stepfather, Sara (Choi) runs away from home, earns her own keep and spends her nights in various locales, including country parks and fast-food joints that stay open 24 hours. While hanging around the Tsim Sha Tsui East promenade late one evening, she meets the gentlemanly, middle-aged Kam Ho-yin (Simon Yam Tat-wah). The two embark on a complex relationship that involves him getting her into a good school and a new life she chooses to take.

== Cast ==
- Charlene Choi as Sara Ho
- Simon Yam as Kam Ho-yin
- Sunadcha Tadrabiab as Dok-my, an underage prostitute in Thailand
- Ryan Lau as Raymond, Sara's boyfriend
- Alien Sun as Tong May, Sara's mother
- Tony Ho as Kwok Wah, Sara's stepfather
- Benson Ling as Patrick
- Lam Chiu-wing as Magazine Chief Editor
- Mimi Kung as Kam Ho-yin's wife
- Tsui Siu-wa as University professor

== Reception ==
=== Box office ===
The film has grossed HK$6.27 million (US$808,000) over four days. In the second week, the film has grossed HK$4.14 million (US$533,000). In the fourth week, the film has grossed HK$3.32 million (US$429,000) with a total of HK$18.1 million (US$2.34 million).

=== Awards ===
6th Macau International Movie Festival
Nominee	Awards	Remarks	Results
Simon Yam	Best Actor	-	Won
Charlene Choi	Best Actress	-	Won
21st Hong Kong Film Critics Society Award
Nominee	Awards	Remarks	Results
Sara	Films of Merit	-	Won
10th Osaka Asian Film Festival
Nominee	Awards	Remarks	Results
Charlene Choi	Special Mention	-	Won
34th Hong Kong Film Award
Nominee	Awards	Remarks	Results
Charlene Choi	Best Actress	-	Nominated
