= Chinese Paladin 5 (TV series) =

2016 Chinese television series

- Also known as: Clouds of the World
- 仙剑云之凡
- Genre: Fantasy; Adventure; Romance; Xianxia
- Written by: Wang Lizhi
- Directed by: Li Kwok-lap; Zheng Weiwen; He Zhenhua; Xu Huikang
- Starring: Elvis Han; Guli Nazha; Joe Cheng; Yang Caiqi; Gina Jin; Geng Le
- Opening theme: Each Other by Power Station
- Ending theme: Different Way by S.H.E
- Country of origin: China
- Original language: Mandarin
- No. of episodes: 40 (TV version), 45 (uncensored version)

Production
- Producer: Karen Tsoi
- Running time: 45 minutes
- Production companies: Chinese Entertainment Shanghai; Linmon Pictures

Original release
- Network: Hunan TV
- Release: 23 May – 19 July 2016

Related
- Chinese Paladin, Chinese Paladin 3

Chinese Paladin 5 (Chinese: 仙剑云之凡) is a 2016 Chinese television series adapted from the adventure role-playing game of the same name by Softstar Entertainment. The series is produced by Chinese Entertainment Shanghai and stars Elvis Han, Guli Nazha, Joe Cheng, Yang Caiqi, Gina Jin and Geng Le. It was first aired on Hunan TV from 23 May to 19 July 2016.

== Synopsis ==
Jiang Yunfan (Elvis Han), the son of a demon lord, becomes entangled in the fight between the human realm and Netherworld when the gate between both realms are threatened. Along the way, he meets Tang Yurou (Guli Nazha), a beautiful but sickly girl that has a mysterious condition and who teaches him about love and sacrifice. He also encounters Long You (Joe Cheng), the second prince of a demon tribe of questionable origins who is searching for his brother as well as Xiao Man (Yang Caiqi), the descendant of Nuwa seeking a stolen artifact. Yun Fan ends up developing friendships and relationships on his journey. However, his father, the demon king is going to be killed by gods and goddesses on earth to release his demon power. Yun Fan thus becomes embroiled in the conflict between good and evil. He has to choose in saving his father or aiding the immortals in killing him permanently.

== Cast ==
=== Main ===
- Elvis Han as Jiang Yunfan

Son of the Demon Lord and human Mother. After the passing of his mother, Yunfan is sent to reside at Gale Fortress also known as his second family, home to mountain bandits. A series of events occur, causing him to become a disciple of Sage Yi Pin at Mt Shu. Throughout the journey, he befriends Long You, Xiao Man and develops a special relationship with Yurou.

- Guli Nazha as Tang Yurou

A disciple of Sage Cao Gu of Mt Shu, Yurou has talent in medicine and bears an unusual illness since her birth causing her to have a short lifespan. She ventures on a journey with her friends Yunfan, Long You and Xiao Man.

- Joe Cheng as Long You

The 2nd prince and future king of the demon realm. He leaves his realm to find his long lost brother Long Ming, save the Demon Lord and to save the demon realm from serious drought. He becomes a disciple of Sage Yu Shu at Mt Shu. On the way he befriends Yunfan, Xiao Man and Yurou. He is fond of Xiao Man and Ling Yin.

- Yang Caiqi as Xiao Man

A descendant of Goddess Nuwa, grand daughter of Sage Yi Pin and disciple of Lady Hai Tang. She is a lovely adorable girl who is not afraid of doing what it takes to save the world from harm. Along the journey, she meets Long You, Yunfan and Yurou and becomes their main source of help. She is especially close with Long You.

- Gina Jin as Ling Yin / Ling Bo
  - Chai Wei as teen Ling Yin

One of the seven sages at Mt Shu and sister of Ling Bo. She is a righteous woman and always has a reason for her actions. Due to the il-fated relationship between her sister and Long Ming, she resents all demons. However, she later likes Long You.

- Geng Le as Jiang Shili

The Demon Lord of Clear Sky Sect and biological father of Yunfan. He was captured and sealed in a stone made of Nuwa’s blood for 20 years in Mt Shu and has a revengeful personality.

=== Supporting ===
==== Sages of Mt Shu ====
- Canti Lau as Yi Pin (Li Xiaoyao)
- Deng Limin as Tai Wu
- Guo Xiaoting as Cao Gu
- Yang Tie as Qing Shi
- Zhang Xiang as Yu Shu
- Lu Senbao as Tie Bi

==== Others ====
- Cya Liu as Fang Caiwei

Yunfan's god sister and friend from Gale Fortress

- Jing Chao as Long Ming

Long You's older brother and 1st prince of the demon realm

- Wu Jianfei as Shangguan Ya

Yunfan's enemy who loves Yurou

- Che Yongli as Ouyang Qian
- Wang Xuanyu as Ouyang Hui
- Han Dong as Xia Gulin
- Li Yuan as Lin Weiyang
- Ye Qing as Yu Chang
- Zhang Rui as Zhu Youya
- Wang Zhixuan as Du Ying
- Zhang Lei as Huangfu Zuo
- Song Ning as Xie Shou
- Yin Zhusheng as Mo Yi
- Wang Yansu as Lady Haitang (A'Nu)

Guardian of Goddess Nuwa in Miao Jing

- Ren Xuehai as Xia Houzhang
- Wang Chunyuan as Yin Qilei
- Meng Weiming as Fang Yongsi
- Cui Kefa as Ouyang Ying
- Su Mao as Tang Hai
- Zhang Ruijia as Yu Jiaohong
- Xi Meijuan as A Zhu's mother
- Sun Yaoqi as Heng Wenwen

A disciple at Mt Shu who likes Yunfan

- Li Sicheng as Yi Xiaodan
- Wang Yilin as Kun Feixue
- Ji Zihan as Bing Lin
- Xing En as Su Xingchen

== Soundtrack ==
Chinese Paladin 5 - Original Television Soundtrack ( 仙劍雲之凡电视剧原声音乐大碟)
No.	Title	Music	Length
1.	"Each Other (彼此)" (Opening theme song)	Power Station
2.	"Different Way (殊途)" (Ending theme song)	S.H.E
3.	"Not Able to Love (无法说爱)"	Elvis Han
4.	"Granted (成全)"	Janice Yan

== Ratings ==
- Highest ratings are marked in red, lowest ratings are marked in blue

Air date	Episode	Unit name	CSM52 city network ratings		CSM National Network ratings	
Air date	Episode	Unit name	Ratings	Ratings share	Ratings	Ratings share
May 23, 2016	1-2	Sushan	0.580	3.513	0.75	6.15
May 24, 2016	3-4	Sushan	0.690	3.981	0.60	4.83
May 30, 2016	5-6	Old friend in mysterious dream	0.825	4.965	0.70	5.62
May 31, 2016	7-8	Old friend in mysterious dream	0.880	5.130	0.79	6.19
June 6, 2016	9-10	Love	0.653	4.036	0.71	5.51
June 7, 2016	11-12	Love	0.651	3.954	0.61	4.90
June 13, 2016	13-14	The long-term love	0.669	3.480	0.62	4.45
June 14, 2016	15-16	The long-term love	0.625	3.558	0.60	4.69
June 20, 2016	17-18	The mystery of the bottom of the lock demon tower	0.614	3.743	0.47	3.74
June 21, 2016	19-20	The mystery of the bottom of the lock demon tower	0.560	3.381	0.44	3.58
June 27, 2016	21-23	Return to God's Secret	0.503	3.335	0.39	3.36
June 28, 2016	24-26	Return to God's Secret	0.623	4.235	0.53	4.75
July 4, 2016	27-29	Secret words in fairy dreams	0.676	4.402	0.77	6.42
July 5, 2016	30-32	Secret words in fairy dreams	0.739	4.648	0.69	5.68
July 11, 2016	33-35	Mysterious dreams are back	0.547	3.721	0.54	4.64
July 12, 2016	36-38	Mysterious dreams are back	0.550	3.572	0.50	4.25
July 17, 2016	39-41	Battle of Gods	0.354	2.104	0.44	3.44
July 18, 2016	42-43	Battle of Gods	0.614	3.405	0.64	4.44
July 19, 2016	44-45	Battle of Gods	0.684	3.615	Not available	
