= Five Minutes to Tomorrow =

- Film poster
- Directed by: Isao Yukisada
- Screenplay by: Anne Horiizumi
- Based on: Five Minutes to Tomorrow by Takayoshi Honda
- Starring: Cecilia Liu; Haruma Miura; Joseph Chang
- Cinematography: Kōichi Nakayama
- Production companies: Shenzhen Meixun Jiarun Entertainment Investment Co., Ltd; Beijing Fenghuang Liandong Entertainment Co., Ltd; Shanghai GCod Entertainment Co., Ltd; Fuxing Quanya Media (Shanghai) Co., Ltd; Shimei Media (Beijing) Co., Ltd; Xian Qujiang Meilin Entertainment Co., Ltd; Shanghai Lezai Qizhong Entertainment Co., Ltd
- Release dates: October 23, 2014 (China); December 27, 2014 (Japan)
- Running time: 127 minutes
- Countries: Japan; China
- Language: Mandarin
- Box office: ¥8.35 million (China)

Five Minutes to Tomorrow (Chinese: 深夜前的五分钟) is a 2014 Japanese-Chinese romance suspense film directed by Isao Yukisada based on the Japanese novel of the same name by Takayoshi Honda. The movie, starring Liu Shishi, Haruma Miura, and Joseph Chang, tells a complex love story between twin sisters Ruolan and Rumei and two men, A Liang and Tianlun.

The film premiered globally at the Busan International Film Festival on October 2, 2014, was released in Mainland China on October 23, 2014, and was released in Japan on December 27, 2014.

== Plot ==
Aliang is a watchmaker in a retro watch shop. Aliang, who likes swimming, met the mysterious and melancholy columnist Ruolan in the swimming pool. Aliang was deeply fascinated by her. Ruolan has a twin sister Rumei. In contrast to Ruolan, Rumei is a lively and cheerful superstar, and she has a gentle, tall, rich and handsome fiancé Tianlun, who is an excellent film director. Aliang, Tianlun, Ruolan and Rumei quickly formed a four-person dating group. The Ruolan sisters often played the game of exchanging identities to enjoy a double life. However, under the surface of peace, Aliang gradually noticed the seemingly close estrangement between the sisters Ruolan and Rumei. Before Rumei's wedding, the two sisters decided to go to Mauritius for their last single trip, but they encountered a shipwreck and only one survived. Is she Ruolan or Rumei? The three people were involved in a confusing emotional entanglement.

== Cast ==
- Cecilia Liu as Maggie/Michelle
- Haruma Miura as Ryo
- Joseph Chang as Tian Lun
- Niu Ben
- Yu Ya
- Wang Zhihua
- Sheng Kexin
- Sheng Keyi
- Zhang Yibai

== Reception ==
As of October 28, the film had earned ¥8.35 million at the Chinese box office.
