= Shapolang =

Collective term in Chinese astrology

Sha Po Lang (traditional Chinese: 殺破狼; simplified Chinese: 杀破狼; pinyin: Shā Pò Láng) is a collective term for three stars in Chinese astrology used in the Zi Wei Dou Shu 紫微斗數 method of fortune-telling.

The three stars are:

- Qi Sha (traditional Chinese: 七殺; simplified Chinese: 七杀; pinyin: Qī Shā; lit. 'Seven Killings'), equivalent to Polis, symbolising power
- Po Jun (traditional Chinese: 破軍; simplified Chinese: 破军; pinyin: Pò Jūn; lit. 'Vanquisher of Armies'), equivalent to Alkaid, symbolising destruction
- Tan Lang (traditional Chinese: 貪狼; simplified Chinese: 贪狼; pinyin: Tān Láng; lit. 'Greedy Wolf'), equivalent to Dubhe, symbolising lust.
