= Tong Dawei =

Chinese actor and singer (born 1979)

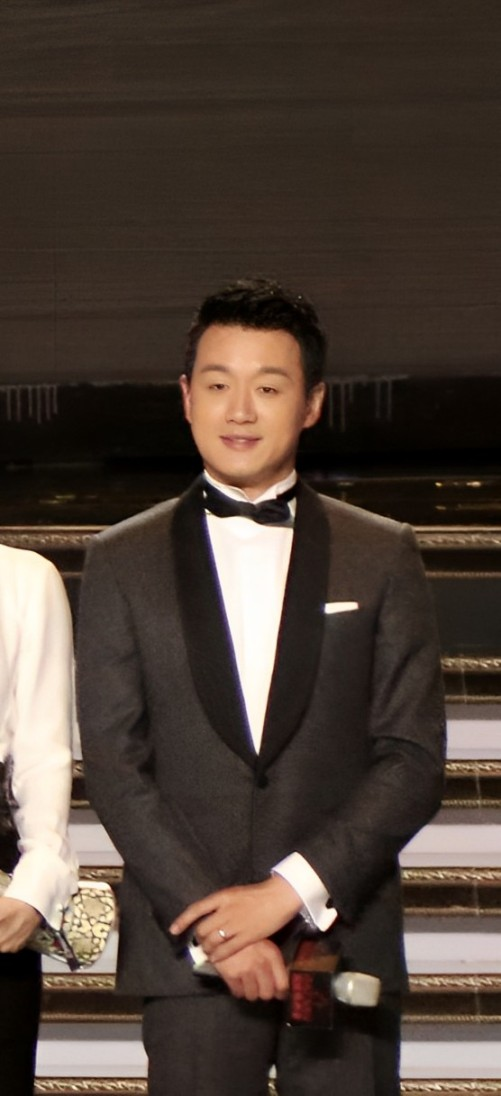
- Tong in 2016
- Born: 3 February 1979 (age 47); Fushun, Liaoning
- Other name: David Tong
- Education: Shanghai Theatre Academy
- Occupations: Actor; Singer
- Years active: 1998–present
- Spouse: Guan Yue (m. 2008)
- Children: 3

Tong Dawei (simplified Chinese: 佟大为; traditional Chinese: 佟大為; pinyin: Tóng Dàwéi, born 3 February 1979) is a Chinese actor and singer. Tong is best known for starring in the television series Jade Goddess of Mercy (2003), Struggle (2007), and Tiger Mom (2015); as well as the films Lost in Beijing (2007), The Flowers of War (2011) and American Dreams in China (2013).

Tong ranked 97th on Forbes China Celebrity 100 list in 2013, 84th in 2014, and 51st in 2015.

== Early life and career ==
Tong Dawei was born in 1979 in Fushun, Liaoning. He joined the Shanghai Theater Academy in 1997 and graduated in 2001 with a Bachelor of Arts in Acting.

Tong first gained attention for his role in the romantic film I Love You (2002) by acclaimed director Zhang Yuan. He then starred in Jade Goddess of Mercy (2003), which was a huge hit with the audience in China and launched Tong into a household name. After the success of Jade Goddess of Mercy, none of Tong's performance struck a chord in the audience, till he starred in the youth drama Romantic Life (2006). His powerful performance in the series left a deep impression on the audiences, and Tong returned to the limelight once again.

Tong hit a new peak in his career with his most successful television series yet; Struggle (2007). Based on the popular novel by Shi Kang, Struggle gained unexpected acclaim and was seen as a breakthrough in Chinese TV production as it broke from the usual Chinese TV series focusing in traditional legends and series. Tong's character, Lu Tao, reflected the rise in a new social class in modern China. The same year, he starred in Lost in Beijing which premiered at the Berlin Film Festival and earned Tong a Best New Actor nomination at the Busan Film Critics Awards. He released his debut vocal album titled Da Shi Jie Xiao Zuo Wei (A Small Action in a Big World) in 2007.

In 2008, Tong starred in war epic Red Cliff: Part II, directed by John Woo. The film was also shown at the 2008 Cannes Film Festival, bringing Tong onto the international platform for the first time. The same year, Tong joined the Chinese ensemble in the film The Founding of a Republic, a movie marking the 60th Anniversary of the People's Republic of China.

In 2011, Tong starred in award-winning director Zhang Yimou's film The Flowers of War. Dealing with the sensitive issue of the Rape of Nanjing, Tong plays Major Lee, who died as a hero to save his lost friend during China's anti-Japanese war. To better portray the role, Tong underwent military-like training and lost 16 pounds. Zhang praised Tong's performance, saying that he added an "intellectual temperament to his character" and said he continues to "break through and impress the audience." He became the first Chinese actor to walk the red carpet of the Golden Globe Awards.

Tong received acclaim for his role as an artistic youth in Peter Chan's American Dreams in China (2013), and he won the Best Supporting Actor awards at the Changchun Film Festival and Hundred Flowers Award. This was followed by another role in Peter Chan film, the critically acclaimed Dearest (2014), based on a true story about child abduction. He also co-starred in John Woo's romantic epic The Crossing (2014), based on the true story of the Taiping steamer collision and follows six characters and their intertwining love stories in Taiwan and Shanghai during the 1930s.

Tong reunited with Dearest co-star Zhao Wei in the television series Tiger Mom (2015), which focuses on parenting and children education. Tong won Best Actor at the 17th Huading Awards for his performance.

In 2016, Tong was appointed goodwill ambassador of National Committees for UN Women.

== Personal life ==
On 17 April 2008, Tong married Guan Yue (born 1979), a film and television actress and the niece of Rosamund Kwan. The wedding was held in the Hotel Sofitel Wanda, Beijing. They have two daughters and one son.

== Filmography ==
=== Film ===
Year	English title	Chinese title	Role	Notes/Ref.
2001	One Hundred Thieves	一百个小偷	Shi Gang	
2003	Double Dating	非常浪漫	Xiao Chun	
2003	I Love You	我爱你	Wang Yi	
2003	Sky of Love	情牵一线	Wen Tao	
2003	Fall in Love at First Sight	一见钟情	Zhao Benxuan	
2007	Lost in Beijing	苹果	An Kun	
2008	Volunteer	志愿者	Xiao Ran	
2008	Fit Lover	爱情呼叫转移II：爱情左右	Zhang Ting	
2009	Red Cliff: Part II	赤壁-下	Sun Shucai	
2009	On His Majesty's Secret Service	大内密探灵灵狗	Royal Tiger	
2009	The Founding of a Republic	建国大业	Kong Lingkan	
2009	Mars Baby	火星沒事	Bank Staff	Cameo
2011	Treasure Inn	财神客栈	Wen Wenqie	
2011	Great Wall My Love	追爱	Fang Mingdi	
2011	The Flowers of War	金陵十三釵	Major Li	
2012	To My Wife	与妻书	Lin Juemin	
2012	The Zodiac Mystery	十二星座离奇事件	Chen Wei	
2012	All for Love	三个未婚妈妈	Dong Bei's brother	Cameo
2013	Better and Better	越來越好之村晚	Geng Zhi	
2013	American Dreams in China	中国合伙人	Wang Yang	
2013	Switch	天机·富春山居图	Toshio	
2013	Badges of Fury	不二神探	Real Estate Manager	Cameo
2014	Dearest	亲爱的	Gao Xia	
2014	But Always	一生一世	Teacher	Cameo
2014	The Crossing	太平轮	Tong Daqing	
2014	Meet Miss Anxiety	我的早更女友	Yuan Xiao'ou	
2014	Love on the Cloud	微爱之渐入佳境	Security guard	Cameo
2015	You Are My Sunshine	何以笙箫默	Ying Hui	
2015	Hollywood Adventures	横冲直撞好莱坞	Fang Dawei	
2015	The Crossing 2	太平轮2	Tong Daqing	
2016	Lost in White	冰河追凶	Wang Hao	
2016	Scandal Maker	外公芳龄38	He Zhiwu	
2018	Goddesses in the Flames of War	那些女人	Teacher Bao	Cameo
2018	Dream Breaker	破梦游戏	Jiang Shan	Cameo
2018	Kill Mobile	手机狂响	Jia Di	
2019	My People, My Country	我和我的祖国	Luo Lang	
2019	Fatal Visit	圣荷西谋杀案	Sun Ning	
2021	1921	1921	Zhang Renjie	
2023	Nation General 1955	开国将帅授衔1955	Chen Yi (young)	

=== Television series ===
Year	English title	Chinese title	Role	Notes/Ref.
1999	Brother's Wife	嫂娘	Yun Dong	
1999	Difficult Lover	难得有情人	Tan Yonglin	Cameo
2000	Life of a Century	世纪人生	Da Ming	
2000	Green Wedding	绿色婚礼	Xiao Yong	
2001	Young Justice Bao II	少年包青天II	Emperor Song	
2001	All the Misfortunes Caused by the Angel	都是天使惹的禍	Xiong Feng	
2002	Date at the Aquarium	海洋馆的约会	Mai Di	
2003	Network Love Story	一网情深	Zhou Wei	
2003	Jade Goddess of Mercy	玉观音	Yang Rui	
2004	First Intimate Contact	第一次親密接觸	Pizi Cai	
2004	Water Lilies	出水芙蓉	Gao Chu	
2004	Butterfly Fantasy	蝴蝶飞飞	Lan Dongchen	
2004	Crimson Romance	紅粉世家	Yu Shuicun	
2004	Heaven Has Eyes	苍天有眼	Wu Yu	
2004	Taste of Summer	夏天的味道	Zhu Cheng	
2004	Family on a Diet	瘦身家族	Tang Manjin	
2005	The Vinegar Tribe	醋溜族	Xiao Bai	
2006	Give the Definite Word	一言为定	Ximen Hong	
2006	Romantic Life	与青春有关的日子	Fang Yan	
2007	We Have Nowhere to Place Youth	我们无处安放的青春	Li Ran	
2007	Struggle	奋斗	Lu Tao	
2007	Special Police	女特警	Liu Chun	
2008	The So-called Marriage	所谓婚姻	Wu De	
2008	How Far Is It to My Happiness	幸福还有多远	Wang Xiaomao	
2009	The Perfect Happiness	幸福的完美	Worker	Cameo
2009	Sniper	狙击手	Long Shaoqin	
2010	Marriage Battle	婚姻保卫战	Guo Yang	
2011	All Men Are Brothers	新水浒	Su Dongpo	Cameo
2011	To Southeast Asia	下南洋	Jian Zhaoqing	
2011	Waiting For Our Happiness	远远的爱	Lin Ziyang	
2013	Wonder Lady	我的极品是前任		Cameo
2013	Matched For Marriage	门·第	He Chunsheng	
2013	Longmen Express	龙门镖局	Tong Chengchou	Cameo
2013	Little Daddy	小爸爸	Boss	Cameo
2014	May December Love	大丈夫	Cheng Wu	Cameo
2014	My Son is Unique	我的儿子是奇葩	Chu Hanmin	
2014	10 Rides of Red Army	十送红军	Zhang Erguang	
2015	Think Before You Marry	想明白了再结婚	Long Xia	
2015	Tiger Mom	虎妈猫爸	Luo Su	
2015	My Baby	我的宝贝	Yuan Xiaofan	
2017	Love Actually	人间至味是清欢	Ding Renjian	
2019	If I Can Love You So	如果可以这样爱	Geng Mochi	
2019	The Galloped Era	奔腾年代	Chang Hanqing	
2020	The Centimeter of Love	爱的厘米	Zhuge Qingfeng	
2021	New Generation: Emergency Rescue	我们的新时代	Cao Chong	
2021	A Love for Dilemma	小舍得	Xia Junshan	
2021	Medal of the Republic	功勋	Sun Jiadong	
2022	Modern Marriage	我们的婚姻	Sheng Jiangchuan	
2022	The Disappearing Child	消失的孩子	Yang Yuan	
2023	Prosecution Elites	公诉	He Luyuan	
2024	The Tale of Rose	玫瑰的故事	Huang Zhenhua	
2024	Interlaced Scenes	错位	Gu Jiming	
2024	Once Again	好运家	Peng Haodong	
2024	The Top Speed	奔跑吧急救医生	Zhang Chi	
2025	Love Again	我的后半生	Shen Qing	
2026	The Glamorous Night	夜色正浓	Li Dongming	
2026	Inseparable	昨夜将至	Han Dong	
TBA	The Lost Scrolls	宋纸迷踪	Lan Yi	
TBA	Mind the Gap	一念无间	Su Ming	
TBA	G.A.E.A.	迴旋世界		
TBA	Love Without a Trace	爱无痕	Tong Tianqing	

== Awards and nominations ==
Year	Award	Category	Nominated work	Result	Ref.
2003	9th Huabiao Film Awards	Best Newcomer	I Love You	Nominated	
2004	24th Flying Apsaras Award	Best Actor	Jade Goddess of Mercy	Nominated	
2004	22nd China TV Golden Eagle Award	Best Actor	Jade Goddess of Mercy	Won	
2005	5th Top Ten China TV Arts	Best Actor	Jade Goddess of Mercy	Won	
2006	11th Busan Film Critics Awards	Best Newcomer	Lost in Beijing	Nominated	
2007	57th Berlin International Film Festival	Best Actor	Lost in Beijing	Nominated	
2012	12th Chinese Film Media Awards	Most Popular Actor	The Flowers of War	Won	
2013	5th China Image Film Festival	Best Actor	American Dreams in China	Nominated	
2013	5th China Image Film Festival	Most Popular Actor	American Dreams in China	Won	
2013	50th Golden Horse Awards	Best Supporting Actor	American Dreams in China	Nominated	
2013	10th Guangzhou Student Film Festival	Most Popular Actor	American Dreams in China	Won	
2013	56th Asia-Pacific Film Festival	Best Supporting Actor	American Dreams in China	Nominated	
2014	33rd Hong Kong Film Awards	Best Supporting Actor	American Dreams in China	Nominated	
2014	12th Changchun Film Festival	Best Supporting Actor	American Dreams in China	Won	
2014	32nd Hundred Flowers Award	Best Supporting Actor	American Dreams in China	Won	
2014	10th Chinese American Film Festival	Best Supporting Actor	American Dreams in China	Won	
2015	16th Huading Awards	Best Supporting Actor	The Crossing	Nominated	
2015	17th Huading Awards	Best Actor	Tiger Mom	Won	
2015	20th Asian Television Award	Best Actor	Tiger Mom	Nominated	
2016	22nd Shanghai Television Festival	Best Actor	Tiger Mom	Nominated	
2019	Golden Bud – The Fourth Network Film And Television Festival	Best Actor	If I Can Love You So, The Galloped Age	Nominated	
2020	7th The Actors of China Award Ceremony	Best Actor (Sapphire)	—N/a	Nominated	
