= Chinese Paladin 3 (TV series) =

Chinese television series

- DVD Cover
- Genre: Wuxia; Romance; Fantasy; Adventure
- Written by: Deng Zishan
- Directed by: Lee Kwok-lap
- Starring: Hu Ge; Wallace Huo; Yang Mi; Cecilia Liu; Tiffany Tang; Jerry Huang
- Opening theme: Love Forever and Ever by Kary Ng
- Ending theme: Forgot the Time by Hu Ge
- Composer: Mak Chun Hung
- Country of origin: China
- Original language: Mandarin
- No. of episodes: 37

Production
- Producer: Karen Tsoi
- Running time: 45 minutes per episode

Original release
- Network: Taizhou Broadcasting Station
- Release: 2009 – 2009

Related
- Chinese Paladin (2005); Chinese Paladin 5 (2016)

Chinese Paladin 3
- Chinese Paladin 3 intertitle
- Traditional Chinese: 仙劍奇俠傳三
- Simplified Chinese: 仙剑奇侠传三
Transcriptions
Standard Mandarin
- Hanyu Pinyin: Xiān Jiàn Qí Xiá Zhuàn Sān

Chinese Paladin 3 (Chinese: 仙剑奇侠传三) is a 2009 Chinese television series adapted from the video game of the same title, and, because of an added time travel concept allowing the protagonist from Chinese Paladin (2005) to appear in the setting decades before the events of the first. It was first aired on Taizhou Broadcasting Station in June 2009. Chinese Paladin 2 was not filmed because the producers felt that the third game had a much stronger story than the second.

The series achieved massive popularity and topped ratings chart in various regions of China. It was awarded the Ratings Contribution award at the Sichuan Festival.

== Synopsis ==
This is a prequel to Chinese Paladin and takes place 50 years earlier.

Jing Tian (Hu Ge) is a mischievous pawnshop assistant who because of the power of a mystical jade, crosses paths with the spoiled and sassy Tang Xue Jian (Yang Mi). Xue Jian is the beloved granddaughter of Tang Manor's Tang Kun, who meets with danger when an evil cult tries to take over control of the Tang Manor. Xu Changqing (Wallace Huo), the eldest disciple of Mt Shu Sect aids the pair in defeating the cult and rescuing the Tang Manor.

Meanwhile, Chong Lou (Jerry Huang), ruler of the evil world, breaks into Mt Shu's Suo Yao Pagoda to retrieve a magical sword. He passes the sword to Jing Tian, claiming that it belonged to the latter when he was a deity in his past life and forces Jing Tian to battle with him. The 5 elders of Mt Shu Sect call upon Jing Tian and Chang Qing to attain 5 mystical pearls to seal up Suo Ya Pagoda and destroy a powerful force of evil so as to save the world from destruction. Together with Xue Jian, the group set off to accomplish their mission.

On the way, they overcome various obstacles and must solve mysteries pertaining to their pasts. Long Kui (Cecilia Liu), a 1000-year-old ghost emerges from the magical sword Jing Tian possessed. She claimed to be the princess of Jiang, and that he is her beloved brother. Later, Jing Tian realizes that Long Kui is telling the truth so she journeys with them. Next, Xu Changqing meets Zi Xuan (Tiffany Tang), a 200-year-old descendant of the Nuwa goddess. Chang Qing discovers his memory of her was sealed and she was, in fact, the love of his life in two lifetimes. Struggling to deal with his feelings and carrying the burden to save the world, he initially rejects her. Jing Tian also comes to realize he was Fei Peng (2,000 years ago) and Long Yang (1,000 years ago). Xue Jian also finds out that she was originally a fruit created by Xi Yao, a goddess who guards the tree in the heavenly realm. It blooms a flower in 500 years and grows a fruit in 1,000 years.

Eventually, Evil Sword Immortal takes over the world and is in control of all 6 realms making him close to impossible to defeat. Jing Tian combines powers with everyone, along with Chang Qing to defeat him. Long Kui sacrificed herself by sealing her spirit into the sword to strengthen it.

== Cast ==
- Hu Ge as Jingtian / Feipeng / Long Yang / Li Xiaoyao
- Wallace Huo as Xu Changqing / Lin Yeping / Gu Liufang
- Yang Mi as Tang Xue Jian / Xi Yao
- Cecilia Liu as Long Kui
- Tiffany Tang as Zixuan
- Jerry Huang as Chonglou
- Gordon Liu as Evil Sword Immortal
- Lam Chi-chung as Xu Maoshan
- Justin Yuan as Lei Yunting
- Yan Hongyu as Chang Yin
- Liu Rui as He Biping
- Liu Xiaojie as Wan Yuzhi
- He Yan as Divine Lady
- Deng Limin as Tang Tai
- Yue Yueli as Tang Kun
- Guo Xiaoting as Hua Ying
- Han Zhi as Luo Rulie
- Han Xiao as Fire Ghost Queen
- Lin Jiajun as Jingjing
- Xiao Bing as Zhao Wuyan
- Zhao Zhuona as Shuibi
- Song Yang as Xifeng
- Han Zhenhua as Qinghui
- Fan Ming as Heavenly Emperor
- Zong Fengyan as King of Jiang
- Lu Meifang as Tang Zhiyun
- Guo Qiming as Zhao Wenchang
- Chan Ganlin as Chang Huai
- Hu Zhonghu as Shouzhen
- Yang Long as Shouyi
- Jin Sheng as Shouguan
- Sun Jiaolong as Heavenly Demonic Emperor
- Zhang Lei as Tang Yi
- Yao Huiru as Aunt Ma
- Liu Zifei as Jingtian's mother
- Zhou Hong as Jingu
- Lou Yajiang as Jingyi
- Wang Zichen as Wenxuan
- Zhang Jianhong as Wenxuan's mother
- Liu Changsheng as Anxi old man
- Li Linlin as Zhao Wenchang's wife
- Gongfang Min as Gu Liufang's master
- Xu Shouqin as Guteng old man
- Yang Sheng as Ding Shiyan

== Soundtrack ==
Chinese Paladin 3 Original Soundtrack (OST) (仙劍奇俠傳三 電視原聲帶)

Soundtrack album (Digital download / Audio CD) by Various artists
- Released: 2009-12-18
- Label: Gold Typhoon Music Culture Co., Ltd. (金牌大風音樂文化股份有限公司) (TW)

=== Track list ===
1. Shengsheng Shishi Ai (生生世世愛; Love For Eternity) by Kary Ng
2. Wangji Shijian (忘記時間; Forgetting Time) by Hu Ge
3. Cisheng Buhuan (此生不換; Reluctant to Part) by Qingdao Feiyu
4. Guanggun (光棍; Bachelor) performed by Hu Ge
5. Daying Bu Aini (答應不愛你; Promise Not to Love You) by Ronald Cheng
6. Pian'ai (偏愛; Insist on Loving You) by Chang Yun-jing
7. Wozuo Wode Wang (我做我的王; Be My Own King) by Xiongdi Lian
8. Nishiwo Yishou Changbuwan Dege (你是我一首唱不完的歌; You're my Everlasting Song) by Guo Hengqi
9. Xiangmo Jian (降魔劍; Demon-subduing Sword)
10. Xuejian - Xianfan Zhilü (雪見 — 仙凡之旅; Xuejian - Immortal's Journey)
11. Gongban Chuang Tianya (共伴闖天涯; Travel the World Together)
12. Jingtian - Hujia (景天 — 護甲; Jingtian - Armour)
13. Changqing - Zhongsheng Pingdeng (長卿 — 眾生平等; Changqing - Equality of All Sentient Beings)
14. Long Kui - Qiannian Dengdai (龍葵 — 千年等待; Long Kui - Waiting for a Thousand Years)

== See also ==
- Xuan-Yuan Sword: Scar of Sky
