= Tangren Media =

Chinese entertainment company

Tangren Media Co. Ltd.
- Type: Joint venture
- Industry: Film & television production
- Founded: 1998
- Headquarters: Yichang Road, Shanghai, China
- Key people: Karen Tsoi (MD); Chen Yongshan (Deputy MD); Lee Kwok-lap (producer/director); Zhang Dan (marketing); Li Weiji (production)
- Products: Films, TV series
- Website: tangrenmedia.com

Tangren Media Co. Ltd. (Chinese: 唐人影视有限公司), formerly known as Chinese Entertainment Shanghai Limited (Chinese: 上海唐人电影制作有限公司), is a Chinese entertainment and media company established by Karen Tsoi in 1998 that produces television series and films and manages artists. It is currently headquartered in Tianjin, and previously in Shanghai. It has branch offices in Beijing, Hengdian, Hong Kong and Taiwan.

Prominent in the 2000s and early 2010s, Tangren is known for its costume romance dramas, often directed by Lee Kwok-lap, and for launching the careers of Hu Ge, Liu Shishi, and Yuan Hong, who were collectively referred to as the Tangren Trio (唐人三杰).

== Actors and actresses ==
=== Current ===
==== Male ====
- Hu Ge
- Elvis Han
- Lin Yi
- Li Yu (李彧)
- Tu Nan (屠楠)

==== Female ====
- Li Landi
- Hu Bingqing
- Chen Yu'an (陈语安)

=== Past ===
- Sun Li (孫莉)
- Yuan Hong
- Guo Xiaoting (郭晓婷)
- Lin Gengxin
- Jiang Jinfu
- Sun Yizhou
- Liu Shishi
- Xiao Caiqi (小彩旗)
- Cya Liu (刘雅瑟)
- Li Sicheng (李思澄)
- Wang Yilin (王藝霖)
- Jin Chen
- Gulnazar (古力娜扎)
- Zhang Yueyun (章乐韵)
- Chen Yao

== Television series ==
Title	Year	Notes
Suzhou Er Gong Chai (苏州二公差)	1998	
The Legendary Siblings	1999	Based on the novel Juedai Shuangjiao by Gu Long
Legend of Heaven and Earth, the Beauty Mermaid (天地传说之鱼美人)	2000	Based on the novel Yu Lan Ji (鱼篮记)
Legend of Heaven and Earth, the Lotus Lantern (天地传说之宝莲灯)	2001	
Master Sleuth, Ke Lan (神探科蓝)	2001	
Book and Sword, Gratitude and Revenge	2002	Based on the novel The Book and the Sword by Jin Yong
Drunken Fist (醉无敌)	2003	
Westside Story (西街少年)	2003	
The Luckiest Man (天下无双)	2003	
Legendary Fighter: Yang's Heroine (杨门女将之女儿当自强)	2004	
Dandelion (蒲公英)	2004	Based on the novel of the same name by Jie Yanyan
Chinese Paladin	2005	Based on the video game The Legend of Sword and Fairy
The Power of Love (月亮的秘密)	2005	
Phantom Lover (夜半歌声)	2005	
New Strange Tales of Liao Zhai (新聊斋志异)	2005	Based on Pu Songling's Strange Stories from a Chinese Studio
The Little Fairy	2006	
The Young Warriors	2006	Based on The Generals of the Yang Family
Till Death Do Us Apart (別愛我)	2006	Based on the novel First Love (第一次的亲密接触) by Cai Zhiheng
The Fairies of Liaozhai	2007	Based on Pu Songling's Strange Stories from a Chinese Studio
The Legend of the Condor Heroes	2008	Based on the novel The Legend of the Condor Heroes by Jin Yong.
Chinese Paladin 3	2009	Based on the video game The Legend of Sword and Fairy 3
Gen Hong Ding Bai Da San Yuan (跟红顶白大三元)	2009	
A Weaver on the Horizon	2010	
The Vigilantes in Masks	2010	
Scarlet Heart	2011	Based on the novel Bu Bu Jing Xin by Tong Hua
Xuan-Yuan Sword: Scar of Sky	2012	Based on the video game series Xuan-Yuan Sword
Refresh 3+7	2012	Produced in the form of a nano-movie
Scarlet Heart 2	2014	Sequel to Scarlet Heart (not connected to Tong Hua's original novel)
Sound of the Desert	2014	Based on the novel Ballad of the Desert by Tong Hua
Wu Xin: The Monster Killer	2015	Based on the novel of the same name by Ni Luo
The Legend of Qin (秦时明月)	2015	Based on the animated series of the same name
Legend of Nine Tails Fox	2016	Based on Pu Songling's Strange Stories from a Chinese Studio
The Imperial Doctress	2016	
Go! Goal! Fighting! (旋風十一人)	2016	
Chinese Paladin 5	2016	Based on the video game The Legend of Sword and Fairy 5
Wu Xin: The Monster Killer 2	2017	
Beauties in the Closet (柜中美人)	2018	Based on the novel Yan Zhi Zui (胭脂醉) by Shui He
Secret of the Three Kingdoms	2018	Based on the novel of the same name by Ma Boyong
Twenties Once Again (重返20歲)	2018	Based on the film 20 Once Again
Never Gone	2018	Based on the novel of the same name by Xin Yiwu
Fantasy Westward Journey (梦幻西游)	TBA	Based on the video game of the same name
A Dream Back to the Qing Dynasty	TBA	Based on the novel of the same name by Jin Zi
Wu Xin: The Monster Killer 3	TBA	

== Films ==
Title	Year of production	Notes
Chun Feng De Yi Mei Long Zhen (春风得意梅龙镇)	1998	
The Ghost Inside	2004	
Mandheling (美丽曼特宁)	2005	
The 601st Phone Call	2006	
Cherry Returns	2016	

== Company team members ==
Name	Major Achievements	Post
Lee Kwok-lap (Chinese: 李国立	From 1980 to 1989, he worked for Television Broadcasts Limited (abbreviation: TVB, Chinese: 香港无线电视)	Director
Karen Tsai (Chinese: 蔡艺侬)	When she was 25, she established HongKong Film Company, China Film Group (Chinese:中国是电影集团). She has made more than forty TV series and films.	President
Zhang Dan (Chinese: 张丹)	From 1999 to 2005, he worked as the planning department director in EYing video communication Co., Ltd. (Chinese: 峨影影视传播有限公司)	Vice President
Li Weiji (Chinese: 李伟基)	Joined Tangren Film (唐人电影) in 2003.	A&R Director
