= The Legend of the Condor Heroes (2008 TV series) =

2008 Chinese TV series

- Official poster
- Also known as: The Eagle Shooting Heroes
- 射雕英雄传
- Genre: Wuxia
- Based on: The Legend of the Condor Heroes by Jin Yong
- Directed by: Lee Kwok-lap
- Starring: Hu Ge; Ariel Lin; Justin Yuan; Cecilia Liu
- Opening theme: "Lonesome Heroes" (英雄寞) by Ronald Cheng
- Ending theme: "Dark Clouds" (乌云然) by Hu Ge
- Country of origin: China
- Original language: Mandarin
- No. of episodes: 50

Production
- Producer: Karen Tsoi
- Production location: China
- Running time: ≈45 minutes per episode
- Production company: Chinese Entertainment Shanghai

Original release
- Network: KMTV-1
- Release: 18 July 2008 – 2008

The Legend of the Condor Heroes intertitle

The Legend of the Condor Heroes (射雕英雄传) is a 2008 Chinese wuxia television series adapted from the novel of the same title by Jin Yong. Produced by Chinese Entertainment Shanghai, the series starred Hu Ge, Ariel Lin, Justin Yuan and Cecilia Liu in the lead roles. The series was first broadcast on KMTV-1 in China in July 2008.

== Cast ==
- Hu Ge as Guo Jing
- Ariel Lin as Huang Rong
- Justin Yuan as Yang Kang
- Cecilia Liu as Mu Nianci
- Wu Yujuan as Li Ping
- Ren Tianye as Guo Xiaotian
- Kathy Chow as Bao Xiruo
- Weng Jiaming as Yang Tiexin
- Guo Liang as Wanyan Honglie
- Anthony Wong as Huang Yaoshi
- Bryan Leung as Hong Qigong
- Elvis Tsui as Ouyang Feng
- Li Yu as Zhou Botong
- Xiao Rongsheng as Yideng
- Zhao Yi as Qiu Chuji
- Deng Limin as Ke Zhen'e
- Jin Liang as Zhu Cong
- Guo Ming'er as Han Baoju
- Han Zhi as Nan Xiren
- Chen Gang as Zhan A'sheng
- Wang Zhenquan as Quan Jinfa
- He Sirong as Han Xiaoying
- Kong Wei as Mei Chaofeng
- Wang Yunchao as Chen Xuanfeng
- Ba Yin as Temüjin (Genghis Khan)
- Xu Shengnan as Tolui
- Tan Jianchang as Jebe
- Xie Na as Huazheng
- Li Yuan as Jochi
- Yu Jinsheng as Ögedei
- Bai Quanbao as Chagatai
- Yan Hongzhi as Jamukha
- Wang Xiaochen as Feng Heng
- Yang Yi as Ma Yu
- Ji Qilin as Wang Chongyang
- Yang Guang as Wang Chuyi
- Xu Xiaoming as Hao Datong
- Liu Jianwei as Tan Chuduan
- Gong Zhixi as Liu Chuxuan
- Qiu Zi as Sun Bu'er
- Li Jie as Ouyang Ke
- Wang Jianguo as Qiu Qianren / Qiu Qianzhang
- Liu Yiqin as Yinggu
- Yang Yifan as Lu Chengfeng
- Ying Jun as Lu Guanying
- Wang Shasha as Shagu
- Zhang Bojun as Lu Youjiao
- Song Yang as Yin Zhiping
- Zhang Lei as Wanyan Hongxi
- Yu Zikuan as Wanyan Jin (Emperor Zhangzong)
- An Ruiyun as Ala ad-Din Muhammad II
- Lou Yejiang as Xie Bin
- Huang Wei as Jiancheng
- Xue Jian as Weicheng
- He Yan as Si Jiji
- Lu Yong as Duan Tiande
- Xu Ming as Sha Tongtian
- Laopi as Peng Lianhu
- Guo Qiming as Liang Ziweng
- Du Hongjun as Hou Tonghai
- Xiao Bing as Zhang San
- Li Qingxiang as Lingzhi Shangren

== Soundtrack ==
- "Lonesome Heroes" (英雄寞) by Ronald Cheng
- "Dark Clouds" (乌云然) by Hu Ge
- "Hero's Path" (英雄道) by William So
- "I Can Only Love You" (我只能爱你) by Peng Qing

== Production ==
Hu Ge was involved in a car accident on 29 August 2006 while travelling from Hengdian to Shanghai on the highway, resulting in the shooting of the series being delayed due to recovery from his injuries.

Sun Xing and Bryan Leung as Hong Qigong respectively in the series. Screen captures of the original shot and reshot.

During the shooting delay due to Hu Ge's recovery from the accident, the filmmakers started a new project The Fairies of Liaozhai (2007) to keep the crew members occupied while waiting to resume work on The Legend of the Condor Heroes.

Sun Xing was originally cast as Hong Qigong but was later replaced by Bryan Leung due to the delay resulting from Hu Ge's recovery, which made Sun decide to move on, causing legal conflict. Sun filmed some scenes prior to his replacement, and those scenes were reshot again later with Leung taking over Sun's role.

Segments from The Young Warriors (2006) were reused for the flashback scene depicting Yang Zaixing's death.

The Song military costumes were originally made for The Young Warriors (2006). The Mongol military costumes were later reused in A Weaver on the Horizon (2010).

== Reception ==
The series was generally well received in China, despite courting some controversy by changing certain portions of the novel for aesthetic purposes to reach modern audiences.

Some antagonists, such as Yang Kang and Wanyan Honglie, also deviate from their counterparts in the novel, to the point that they are portrayed in a more positive light. Other significant deviations from the original story include: greater drama in the rivalry between Guo Jing and Yang Kang; the Yangs' troubled relationship with each other before they acknowledge themselves as family and Yang Kang's desire for vengeance after his parents' deaths; Yang Kang meeting his newborn son and raising the child with Mu Nianci months before his death; Yang Kang's final repentance before letting Ouyang Feng kill him. This resulted in criticism from the audience, who said that the series resembled a Chiung Yao drama where there are often unnecessary and exaggerated conflicts inserted into the storyline.
