= 1911 (film) =

2011 Chinese film by Jackie Chan

- Theatrical release poster

Chinese name
- Traditional Chinese: 辛亥革命
- Simplified Chinese: 辛亥革命
- Literal meaning: Xinhai Revolution
Transcriptions
Standard Mandarin
- Hanyu Pinyin: Xīnhài gémìng
Yue: Cantonese
- Jyutping: San1 Hoi6 Gaap3 Ming6
- Directed by: Jackie Chan; Zhang Li
- Written by: Wang Xingdong; Chen Baoguang
- Produced by: Wang Zhebin; Wang Tinyun; Bi Shulin
- Starring: Jackie Chan; Winston Chao; Li Bingbing
- Cinematography: Huang Wei
- Edited by: Yang Hongyu
- Music by: Ding Wei
- Production companies: JCE Movies Limited; Chang Ying Film Group Corporation; Shanghai Film Group Corporation; Shanghai Film Studio; Beijing Alnair Culture & Media; Jiangsu Broadcasting Corporation; Jackie Chan International Cinema Culture Holdings; Xiaoxiang Film Studio; China City Construction Holding Group; Hebei Film Studio; Tainjin North Film Group; Media Asia Films; Huaxia Film Distribution; Jackie and JJ Productions
- Distributed by: Media Asia Distributions (Hong Kong); Huaxia Film Distribution; East Film & TV Distribution (China)
- Release dates: 23 September 2011 (China); 29 September 2011 (Hong Kong)
- Running time: 125 minutes
- Countries: China; Hong Kong; Macau
- Languages: Cantonese; English; Mandarin
- Budget: US$30 million

1911 (Chinese: 辛亥革命, also known as Xinhai Revolution and The 1911 Revolution in the worldwide), is a 2011 Chinese historical drama film starring and directed by Jackie Chan in his 100th film as an actor, and co-directed by Zhang Li. The film is about the 1911 Revolution in China, produced to commemorate the revolution's 100th anniversary. The film co-stars, Winston Chao, Li Bingbing, Joan Chen, Hu Ge, and Chan's real life son Jaycee Chan. The film was released on 23 September 2011 in mainland China and on 29 September in Hong Kong; it also opened on the 24th Tokyo International Film Festival later in October.

1911 received mainly negative reviews from Western film critics, who criticized its unengaging propagandistic depiction of the revolution but commended its cinematography.

== Plot ==
The story follows key events of the 1911 Revolution, with a focus on Huang Xing and Sun Yat-sen. It begins with the Wuchang Uprising of 1911 and follows through historical events such as the Second Guangzhou Uprising on 27 April 1911, the deaths of the 72 martyrs, the election of Sun Yat-sen as the provisional president of the new Provisional Republic of China, the abdication of the last Qing dynasty emperor Puyi on 12 February 1912, and Yuan Shikai becoming the new provisional president in Beijing on 10 March 1912.

== Cast ==
- Jackie Chan as revolutionary Huang Xing
- Winston Chao as Sun Yat-sen
- Li Bingbing as Xu Zonghan
- Sun Chun as Yuan Shikai
- Jaycee Chan as Zhang Zhenwu
- Hu Ge as Lin Juemin
- Yu Shaoqun as Wang Jingwei
- Joan Chen as Empress Dowager Longyu
- Huang Zhizhong as Situ Meitang
- Jiang Wu as Li Yuanhong
- Ning Jing as Qiu Jin
- Jiang Wenli as Soong Ching-ling
- Mei Ting as Chen Yiying
- Xing Jiadong as Song Jiaoren
- Wei Zongwan as Yikuang
- Hu Ming as Liao Zhongkai
- Iva Law as Consort Jin
- Huo Qing as Tan Renfeng
- Qi Dao as Wu Zhaolin
- Dennis To as Xiong Bingkun
- Tao Zeru as Tang Weiyong
- Wang Ziwen as Tang Manrou
- Ye Daying as Wu Tingfang
- Chen Yiheng as Xu Shichang
- Tobgyal (Duobujie) as Feng Guozhang
- Zhang Zhijian as Lin Sen
- Xie Gang as Tang Shaoyi
- Liu Zitian as Hu Hanmin
- Sun Jingji as Yu Peilun
- Michael Lacidonia as Homer Lea
- Gao Bin as Cai Yuanpei
- Wang Wang as Chen Qimei
- Zhao Yaodong as Zhang Taiyan
- Jia Hongwei as Jiang Yiwu
- Su Hanye as Puyi
- Nan Kai as Jin Zhaolong
- Tong Jun as Xiaodezhang
- Jiang Jing as Yuan Shikai's concubine
- Wang Weiwei as Yuan Shikai's concubine
- Wang Luyao as Yuan Shikai's concubine
- Simon Dutton as John Jordan
- He Xiang as Fang Shengdong
- Lan Haoyu as Lin Shishuang
- Xu Ning as Chen Gengxin
- Wei Xiaojun as Red Cross Society leader
- Qin Xuan as Red Cross Society vice leader
- He Qiang as Ju Zheng
- Ma Yan as Liu Cheng'en
- Wang Ya'nan as Yuan Keding
- Zhang Xiaolin as Tieliang
- Lü Yang as Liangbi
- Tan Zengwei as Puwei
- Jack as Yubei'er
- Li Dongxue as Zaifeng
- Liu Guohua as Qing assassin
- Wang Kan as Borjigit Ruicheng
- Xu Wenguang as Zhang Mingqi
- Zuo Zhaohe as Zheng Kun
- Wang Jingfeng as Tao Qisheng
- James Lee Guy as the American representative
- Maxiu as British representative
- Canwu as the German representative
- Duluye as French representative
- Attarian as French representative

== Production ==
Production started on 29 September 2010 in Fuxin, Liaoning, where a camera rolling ceremony was held. After half a year of intense production, it wrapped up on 20 March 2011 in Sanya, Hainan. It is Taiwanese actor Winston Chao's fifth portrayal of Chinese nationalist Sun Yat-sen, after the films The Soong Sisters (1997) and Road to Dawn (2007), and the television series Sun Zhongshan (2001) and Tie jian dan daoyi (2009).

== Release ==
1911 was released on 23 September 2011 in China and on 29 September 2011 in Hong Kong. It opened the 24th Tokyo International Film Festival on 22 October 2011. It was released in its original version in North American theatres on 7 October 2011.

The film was unable to be released in Taiwan as it failed to meet the country's yearly 10-film quota on mainland China imports.

=== Box office ===
The film earned RMB18.1 million on its opening weekend in China. In Hong Kong, it earned only HK$1.0 million during its first six days in theaters.

== Critical response ==
1911 received generally negative reviews from Western film critics; it holds an 8% rating on Rotten Tomatoes. On Metacritic, which uses an average of critics' reviews, it holds 37 out of 100, based on 13 reviews, indicating "generally unfavorable" reviews, e.g. on the Opionator.

Maggie Lee of The Hollywood Reporter largely criticized the film's "insipid, poorly structured screenplay", and wrote: "A mainland Chinese propaganda vehicle through and through, the film postulates history in such a scrappy, inaccessible manner that either as entertainment or education, it's a lost cause." Rachel Saltz of The New York Times described the film as "overly faithful" to being a commemorative work that honors the 1911 revolution, approaching the event "like a great, bloody historical pageant"; she concluded that despite its "excellent" cinematography and engaging early battle scenes, 1911 "remains a kind of lavishly illustrated history lesson." Stephen Cole of The Globe and Mail gave the film two out of four stars, criticizing its dour propagandistic depiction of the revolution, stating that "[Jackie] Chan’s film may be about a war and revolution staged in 1911, but it should feel like it was made in 2011. [...] If all his work was as solemn as 1911, he would never have made 100 movies."

Derek Elly of the now-defunct Film Business Asia gave 1911 a five out of ten, criticizing it overall as "routine" and "unengaging" with its actors' performances "lack[ing] any kind of spark", and unfavorably compared the film to The Founding of a Republic and The Founding of a Party. However, Elly considered the film's cinematography to be worthy of praise.

The Economist noted that while the film was endorsed by the Chinese government officials, ticket sales have been poor. It also noted that the film avoided sensitive topics, such as the reforms which led to the revolution.

== See also ==
Other screen works about the 1911 Revolution:

- Towards the Republic, a 2003 television series
- 1911 Revolution, a 2011 television series
- 72 Heroes, a 2011 film
