= The Vigilantes in Masks =

Chinese television series

- Official poster
- Genre: Wuxia; Action; Comedy
- Directed by: Lee Kwok-lap
- Starring: Wallace Huo; Cecilia Liu; Ma Tianyu; Shi Xingyu
- Opening theme: "The Opening of the World and Plum Blossoms" by Hu Ge
- Ending theme: "Bird of Paradise" by Zheng Jiajia
- Country of origin: China
- Original language: Mandarin
- No. of episodes: 30

Production
- Producer: Karen Tsoi
- Production location: China
- Running time: 45 minutes per episode
- Production company: Chinese Entertainment Shanghai

Original release
- Network: Jiangsu TV
- Release: 20 December 2010

The Vigilantes in Masks
- Intertitle
- Traditional Chinese: 怪俠一枝梅
- Simplified Chinese: 怪侠一枝梅
Transcriptions
Standard Mandarin
- Hanyu Pinyin: Guàixiá Yìzhīméi

The Vigilantes in Masks is a 2010 Chinese television series based on folktales of a Robin Hood-style hero who lived in the Ming Dynasty. Produced by Chinese Entertainment Shanghai, the series star Wallace Huo, Cecilia Liu, Ma Tianyu and Shi Xingyu. Previous adaptations include a 1960 Hong Kong television series, a 1994 film, a 2005 TVB production, a 2008 SBS South Korean television drama, Iljimae, and a 2009 MBC South Korean adaptation The Return of Iljimae.

== Synopsis ==
Li Gexiao is a master in martial arts with intelligence matching his skills. Previously a high ranking Embroidered Uniform Guard with great judicial authority. However, after framed with a crime he had not commit and his family executed, the former marshal had no choice but to become a fugitive. Years later (beginning of the series), he came out of hiding to help a former colleague recover a cargo of stolen gold for disaster relief. He and three chivalrous strangers, thief Yan Sanniang, grifter He Xiaomei, and strongman Chai Hu, unite to form a heroic band of masked vigilantes called "Yi Zhi Mei" (One Blossom Branch) that steals from the wealthiest and the most corrupted to help the people in need, always leaving a plum flower at the scene as their calling card. In the jianghu, they are also a renowned team that fights against injustice, corruption and oppression by the government.

== Cast ==
- Wallace Huo as Li Gexiao (離歌笑)
- Cecilia Liu as Yan Sanniang (燕三娘)
- Ma Tianyu as He Xiaomei (賀小梅) / He Yunhu (賀雲虎)
- Shi Xingyu as Chai Hu (柴胡)
- Edwin Siu as Ying Wuqiu (應無求) / Bao Laiying (包來硬)
- Deng Limin as Yan Song (嚴嵩)
- Liu Kai-chi as Zheng Dongliu (鄭東流)
- Zhang Shann as Zhang Bao (張豹)
- Ethan Yao as Zhang Zhong (張忠)
- Huang Shijia as Miao Xiaoqing (苗小青)
- Xie Meng as Miao Xiaoying (苗小英)
- Dai Chunrong as Abbess Wugou (無垢師太)
- Guan Xiaotong as Chai Yan (柴嫣)
- Wang Chunyuan as Chu Gou (芻狗)
- Ma Xiaoqian as Lin Shuangshuang (林霜霜)
- Lü Yi as Su Ying (蘇櫻)
- Li Bo as Xiao Ben (蕭本)
- Zheng Xiaodong as Liang Ri (梁日)
- Yuan Shanshan as Bingbing (冰冰)
- Tong Liya as Jing Ruyi (荊如憶)
- Wen Haibei as Hai Rui (海瑞)
- Zhang Lei as Jiajing Emperor (明世宗)
- Zhang Mingming as Yan Shifan (嚴世蕃)
- Lou Qi as Bao Son (保公子)
- Guo Jun as Chen Dong (陳東) / He Donglai (賀東來)
- Li Qingxiang as Taoist Xuanxu (玄虛道長)
- Yang Yi as Liang Yue (梁月)

== Soundtrack ==
- Tiandi Meihua Kai (天地梅花開; The Opening of the World and Plum Blossoms) by Hu Ge
- Tiantang Niao (天堂鳥; Bird of Paradise) by Zheng Jiajia
