= Ad Mania =

2011 Chinese TV series

- 廣告風雲
- Genre: Modern drama
- Directed by: Yip Chiu Yee
- Starring: Joe Ma; Raymond Lam; Tiffany Tang; Chen Ran; Justin Yuan
- Theme music composer: Shadya Lan
- Opening theme: "似是而非" by Raymond Lam
- Ending theme: "或許來得及" by Justin Yuan
- Country of origin: China
- Original language: Mandarin
- No. of episodes: 24

Production
- Production locations: Shanghai, China
- Camera setup: Multi camera
- Production company: Shanghai Yuguo Culture Media

Original release
- Network: Chongqing Entertainment Channel
- Release: 17 November 2011 – 2013

Ad Mania
- Traditional Chinese: 廣告風雲
- Simplified Chinese: 广告风云
- Literal meaning: "Advertisement State of Affair"
Transcriptions
Standard Mandarin
- Hanyu Pinyin: Guǎng Gào Fēng Yún
Yue: Cantonese
- Jyutping: Gwong1 Gou2 Fung1 Wan4

Ad Mania is a 2011 Chinese modern serial drama starring Hong Kong actors Joe Ma and Raymond Lam. Filming began in Shanghai on 27 September 2010. and premiered on Chongqing Entertainment Channel on 17 November 2011 but only till to chapter 2. It re-premiered on 5 October 2013.

== Cast ==
=== Li Tian Ad Company ===
| Cast | Role | Description | Age |
|---|---|---|---|
| Joe Ma | Liu Chuangqi 劉創奇 | Li Tian Ad Company General manager Long Tianjue, Ruan Xinli and Guan Zhisheng's superior Zhou Lianli's husband Pang Ruolin's boyfriend | 38 |
| Raymond Lam | Long Tianjue 龍天爵 | Li Tian Ad Company Creative director Liu Chuangqi's subordinate Ruan Xinli and Guan Zhisheng's colleague Ruan Xinli's boyfriend | 28 |
| Tiffany Tang | Ruan Xinli 阮心麗 | Li Tian Ad Company Brand director Later switches to Yi Wei Ad Company; Liu Chuangqi's subordinate Long Tianjue and Guan Zhisheng's colleague Long Tianjue's girlfriend | 26 |
| Ji Shuai (遲帥) | Guan Zhisheng 關志升 | Li Tian Ad Company Enforcement director Liu Chuangqi's subordinate Long Tianjue and Ruan Xinli's colleague | 32 |

=== Yi Wei Ad Company ===
| Cast | Role | Description | Age |
|---|---|---|---|
| Chen Ran (陳燃) | Zhou Lianli 周蓮莉 | Yi Wei Ad Company General manager Ouyang Luo's superior Liu Chuangqi's wife Pang Ruolin's love rival | 32 |
| Justin Yuan | Ouyang Le 歐陽樂 | Yi Wei Ad Company Creative director Zhou Lianli's subordinate Loves Zhou Lianli; Ruan Xinli's friend | |

=== Other cast ===
| Cast | Role | Description | Age |
|---|---|---|---|
| Océane Zhu | Pang Ruolin 龐若琳 | Producer; Liu Chuangqi's girlfriend Zhou Lianli's love rival | |
| Yang Tingting (楊婷婷) | An Qi 安琪 | Model; Loves Long Tianjue | |
