= All Ears =

2023 film directed by Liu Jiayin

- Theatrical release poster
- Simplified Chinese: 不虚此行
- Literal meaning: Well worth the trip
- Hanyu Pinyin: Bù xū cǐ xíng
- Directed by: Liu Jiayin
- Written by: Liu Jiayin
- Produced by: Cao Baoping
- Starring: Hu Ge; Leo Wu; Qi Xi
- Cinematography: Zhou Wencao
- Edited by: Yan Yiping
- Music by: Li Heng
- Production company: Beijing Standard Image Culture Communication
- Distributed by: Alibaba Pictures
- Release date: September 9, 2023 (China)
- Running time: 119 minutes
- Country: China
- Language: Mandarin
- Box office: US$3.8 million

All Ears (Chinese: 不虚此行) is a 2023 Chinese drama film written and directed by Liu Jiayin. It stars Hu Ge as Wen Shan, an ordinary screenwriter who, after unexpectedly making a living by writing eulogies, finds warmth through encounters with various people and ultimately discovers his own direction in life. The film was theatrically released on September 9, 2023.

== Plot ==
Wen Shan, a struggling screenwriter, unexpectedly begins writing eulogies for others. Through this work, he encounters a diverse group of clients, including Mr. Wang, who arranges eulogies for his loved ones; the Wan siblings; Shao Jinsui, who seeks justice for a deceased online friend; entrepreneur Lao Lu, who commissions a eulogy for a colleague; and Aunt Fang, who requests a eulogy for herself. Along Wen Shan's journey of growth, he is accompanied by his spiritual companion Xiao Yin, as well as his friend Pan Congcong who works at a funeral home, and a zookeeper with a story of his own. Through the process of writing eulogies, Wen Shan and his clients experience mutual healing, allowing him to overcome inner turmoil and rediscover himself.

== Cast ==
- Hu Ge as Wen Shan
- Leo Wu as Xiao Yin
- Qi Xi as Shao Jinsui
- Naren Hua as Aunt Fang
- Gan Yunchen as Lao Lu
- Huang Lei as Mr. Wang
- Hu Yaozhi as Wan Xiaoyong
- Bai Ke as Pan Congcong

== Production ==
=== Development ===
The film marks director Liu Jiayin's return to the big screen after 14 years. The story reflects themes of introspection, as both the protagonist and Liu herself identify as introverts who use writing as a tool to process the world around them. Rather than being a simple narrative about a profession, the film delves into human relationships and emotions through the lens of writing eulogies. It explores how introverted individuals perceive the world differently, often noticing things others overlook, and how their use of words becomes both a tool for expression and a sanctuary. Liu has described the film as her deep anticipation for an introvert's life, stating, "I write about the life of an introvert; his life is not aimless."

=== Filming ===
All Ears employs a documentary-style shooting technique, emphasizing realism and emotional authenticity. By utilizing a simple and naturalistic approach, the film critiques the modern short-video era, where audiences seek instant engagement but risk losing deeper meaning and connection. The cinematography follows a super-subjective style, incorporating immersive point-of-view shots that place the audience directly into the protagonist's experiences. This technique allows viewers to connect with the character on a personal level, reinforcing the film's introspective and contemplative nature.

== Release ==
The film was officially announced and began production on March 18, 2022. In late March, the official title announcement image was released. On May 18 of the same year, the teaser poster and English title were officially revealed.

It was also selected in World Focus section of the 36th Tokyo International Film Festival and was screened on October 23, 2023.

== Awards and nominations ==
| Year | Award | Category | Nominee / Work | Result |
|---|---|---|---|---|
| 2023 | 25th Shanghai International Film Festival - Golden Goblet Awards | Best Director | Liu Jiayin | Won |
| 2023 | 25th Shanghai International Film Festival - Golden Goblet Awards | Best Actor | Hu Ge | Won |
