= Trending Topic =

- Theatrical release poster
- Simplified Chinese: 热搜
- Hanyu Pinyin: Rè sōu
- Directed by: Capa Xin
- Written by: Ye Qing; Yang Weiwei; Xu Xiaohu
- Starring: Zhou Dongyu; Song Yang; Yuan Hong
- Release date: November 30, 2023
- Running time: 126 minutes
- Country: China
- Language: Mandarin
- Box office: US$8.8 million

Trending Topic (Chinese: 热搜) is a 2023 Chinese crime drama film directed by Capa Xin, and stars Zhou Dongyu, Song Yang, and Yuan Hong. It was released in theaters in China on 30 November 2023.

== Plot ==
Chen Miao, an online media editor, publishes an unverified video showing a schoolgirl being pushed down a flight of stairs by another schoolgirl. The video goes viral on social media and the second schoolgirl is being vilified by netizens. Unable to face society, the second schoolgirl jumped off a building to attempt suicide. Chen later finds that the now deceased schoolgirl had reached out to her for assistance before, tying the video to a sexual assault case. Chen's investor, He Yan, and boss, Yue Peng, get involved with the case.

== Cast ==
- Zhou Dongyu as Chen Miao
- Song Yang as He Yan
- Yuan Hong as Yue Peng
- Wang Hao as Gong Wen

== Production ==
=== Development ===
Xie Yukun received a script centered on an online media editor in the first half of 2021. Additionally, he also wanted to direct a film on online discourse. Xie would then adjust the script to produce the storyline for this movie.

=== Filming ===
The filming was completed by April 2022.

== Release ==
The film was first released in China on 30 November 2023. It was subsequently released in Malaysia and Singapore on 7 December 2023.

== Reception ==
The film made CN¥55,000,000 in box office sales within 7 days of its release. The film was well received in China by film critics who attended preview screenings of the film, praising the film to be 'close to reality', 'demonstrate the power of Internet', and 'a call for rationality'. However, reviews from Singapore indicated that audiences, who are more exposed Hollywood movies that resolve around reporters exposing cover ups, would not be impressed with the film. The Straits Times writes that the film has a confused agenda.
