= Dai Chunrong =

Chinese actress (born 1962)

- 戴春荣
- Born: 2 February 1962 (age 64); China
- Occupation: Actress
- Years active: 1985–present
- Spouse: 1986

Dai Chunrong (戴春荣) (born 1962 in Xi'an, Shaanxi) is a Chinese television actress and a former Qinqiang actress. Nicknamed the "empress specialist", she has portrayed over a dozen Chinese empresses in Chinese television series.

== Filmography ==
=== Television ===
Year	Title	Role	Notes
1996	Han Gong Fei Yan (汉宫飞燕)	Empress Xu	first TV role
1997	My Fair Princess I (還珠格格I)	Ulanara, the Step Empress	second TV role, breakout role
1998	My Fair Princess II (還珠格格II)	Ulanara, the Step Empress	
2001	Legendary Fighter: Yang's Heroine (楊門女將之女兒當自強)	Empress Xiao Yanyan	
2001	Imperial Palace's Baby (皇宫宝贝)	the empress	
2002	The Legendary Siblings 2 (絕世雙驕II)		
2004	Lady Wu: The First Empress (至尊红颜)	Empress Wu Zetian's mother	
2006	Sigh of His Highness (一生為奴)	Empress Xiaojingcheng	
2006	Seven Swordsmen (七劍下天山)	Empress Dowager Xiaozhuang	
2007	Wo Ai Hedong Shi (我爱河东狮)	the empress	
2009	The Last Night of Madam Chin (金大班)	Jin Zhaoli's mother	produced by Fan Bingbing
2010	A Weaver on the Horizon (天涯織女)	Mrs. Guan	
2010	Journey to the West (西遊記)	royal tutor of Women's Kingdom	
2010	Beauty's Rival in Palace (美人心計)	Empress Lü Zhi	
2011	The Vigilantes in Masks (怪俠一枝梅)	Abbess Wugou	
2011	The Glamorous Imperial Concubine (傾世皇妃)	Empress Dugu	produced by Ruby Lin
2012	Scarlet Heart (步步驚心)	Empress Xiaogongren	
2012	The Legend of Chu Liuxiang (楚留香新傳)	Tuopo	
2013	Big-footed Princess (大脚格格)	the empress dowager	
2013	Prince of Lan Ling (蘭陵王)	Empress Hu	
2018	Story of Yanxi Palace (延禧攻略)	Empress Nara's mother	
2026	Where the Mask Ends	Empress Dowager	

== See also ==
- Sally Chen (born 1948), another actress specializing in Chinese empresses
