= A Weaver on the Horizon =

2010 Chinese TV series

- Official poster
- Also known as: Clothing the World; The Legend of a Weaver; The Tale of the Royal Seamstress; The Weaver
- Genre: Historical fiction Romantic realism
- Directed by: Lee Kwok-lap; Wei Hantao; Lin Yufen; Liang Shengquan; Li Huizhu
- Starring: Janine Chang; Justin Yuan; Cecilia Liu; Edwin Siu
- Opening theme: Forever Believe (永远相信) by Kelly Chen
- Composer: Mak Chun Hung
- Country of origin: China
- Original language: Mandarin
- No. of episodes: 36

Production
- Producers: Karen Tsoi; Lee Kwok-lap
- Production location: China
- Running time: 45 minutes per episode
- Production company: Chinese Entertainment Shanghai

Original release
- Network: Nanning Television
- Release: 14 August 2010 – 2010

A Weaver on the Horizon
- A Weaver on the Horizon intertitle (Traditional Chinese version)
- Traditional Chinese: 天涯織女
- Simplified Chinese: 天涯织女
Transcriptions
Standard Mandarin
- Hanyu Pinyin: Tiānyá Zhínǚ

A Weaver on the Horizon (Chinese: 天涯织女) is a 2010 Chinese television series based on the life story of Huang Daopo, who revolutionized the textile industry during the Mongol conquest of the Song dynasty and the beginning of the Yuan dynasty. The story is considered to be historical fiction, as the plot deviates from factual accounts. A notable feature of the series is that more focus is placed on the female protagonists than their male counterparts. The series premiered on Nanning Television on 14 August 2010 and ran for 36 episodes.

== Synopsis ==
Huang Qiao'er (Ivy Lu, Janine Chang) was born to an impoverished family in Songjiang Prefecture (present-day Shanghai). She loses her parents at an early age and is raised by her aunt in Lin'an (Hangzhou), the capital of the Southern Song (Song dynasty), who teaches her textile arts. While growing up in a textile mill, Qiao'er befriends the son of the neighboring dyehouse owner, Fang Ning (Edwin Siu), who falls in love with her. Eventually, Splendid Mill's weavers produce outstanding results, earning them the opportunity to work in the imperial palace. Through Qiao'er's friendship with the emperor's niece, Zhao Jiayi (Cecilia Liu), Qiao'er gains access to the palace's study, deepening her knowledge of weaving from its collection. However, the weavers become embroiled in a power struggle with the emperor's consorts and in a competition with the Iridescent Cloud Mill's weavers.

While in the palace, Qiao'er becomes infatuated with a young general, Lin Mufei (Justin Yuan), which strains her friendship with the princess. Mufei rejects the princess's affection due to his disdain for the corruption associated with the imperial family, despite his duty to defend the people under the dynasty. During Mufei's absence, Ning is paralyzed after saving Qiao'er from rape. Feeling guilty for Ning's condition and hearing rumors that Mufei has been killed in battle at Chuzhou (present-day Huai'an), Qiao'er concedes to marry Ning. Mufei survives, only to be heartbroken by their marriage—a development that creates a complicated love square between him, Qiao'er, Zhao Jiayi, and Fang Ning.

Huang Qiao'er recognizes that although she cannot be with the man she is enraptured with, being Ning's wife offers certain advantages. Her mother-in-law (Cheng Pei-pei) imparts the family's dyeing secrets, refining her textile skills. Nevertheless, Ning remains aware of Qiao'er's lingering feelings for Lin Mufei. Trapped in a cycle of physical disability and emotional insecurity, Ning's descent into alcoholism turns his love into a source of toxicity, leading him to consider divorce despite his underlying affection. Meanwhile, Zhao Jiayi remains devoted to Lin and, upon discovering he is alive, leaves the palace to find him. With assistance from Mufei's mother, Jiayi locates him in Changzhou, claiming she wishes to be with him in battle.

Not long afterwards, the Mongols, who established the Yuan dynasty under Kublai Khan, conquered Song China. After enduring various hardships, Mufei decides to focus on protecting Zhao Jiayi and her surviving clan members, as well as freeing China from Mongol tyranny. For three years, while fighting for survival, Mufei and Jiayi develop a deep attachment. Jiayi helps Mufei nurse the sorrows resulting from Qiao'er's marriage and his mother's murder by an adversary. He starts to reciprocate the princess's affection when he discovers her deeper qualities beyond her initial vanity.

While escaping Mongol oppression, Qiao'er meets an extraordinary carpenter, Feng Jiujin (Damian Lau), and becomes his apprentice. She is ultimately shipwrecked on the coast of Yazhou (present-day Hainan), where she learns the arts of cotton farming and weaving, helping the natives improve their textile technology.

Years after Fang Ning's death, Qiao'er finally reconciles with Mufei and Jiayi in Hangzhou. Qiao'er realizes she caused heartache for both men when she wavered in her feelings. Furthermore, she recognizes that her differences with Mufei were insurmountable and that she had foregone a fulfilling marriage with Ning due to neglect. Humbled by Jiayi’s fierce devotion to Mufei, Qiao'er finally confronts the wreckage of her own selfishness—regretting her past impulsivity, blessing their union, and stepping onto her own path. As a bereaved weaver, she buries herself in her craft, turning a lifetime of labor into atonement for her follies. Qiao'er also pursues her goal of transforming textile manufacturing to benefit her community, becoming an innovator in the Chinese textile sector. After incessant confrontations against the Yuan forces, the Battle of Yamen brought the Song dynasty to an end. Realizing the enemy would outlast their lifetimes, Mufei and Jiayi walked away, turning their focus to starting their family.

Lin Mufei and Zhao Jiayi marry and return to Hangzhou after spending three years in hiding. By this time, the Splendid Mill and Fang Family Dyehouse have flourished, welcoming new apprentices and achieving business success, and Huang Qiao'er has finally found peace in her realized purpose.

== Cast ==
=== Splendid Mill ===
Cast	Role	Description
Janine Chang	Huang Qiao'er	A visionary orphaned weaver from Songjiang Town who spent her youth dreaming of romance—imagining how wonderful it must feel to be with the one you love truly—ultimately channels her contrition into a social revolution in adulthood. After her fickle nature ruins her own potential for happiness and hurts three people, she brings Hainan’s advanced textile technology to the impoverished people of the Yuan dynasty. The character of Huang Qiao'er draws inspiration from the historical textile innovator Huang Daopo; however, her family history and the toxic romantic quadrangle involving Lin Mufei, Zhao Jiayi, and Fang Ning are entirely fictional.
Ivy Lu	Huang Qiao'er (child)	
Tao Huimin	Wen Ruolan	Huang Qiao'er's mother, who entrusts her daughter to Rong Xiuman's care shortly before her death. Her past is defined by a significant betrayal; she had an affair with Huang Chunyao while he was betrothed to Xiuman, an act that resulted in Qiao'er’s conception and shattered their family's peace.
Amy Chan	Rong Xiuman	The senior and sworn sister of Huang Qiao'er’s mother, Rong Xiuman serves as Qiao'er's devoted mentor. She instructs Qiao'er in the intricate textile arts and remains a constant source of support, eventually accompanying her to Yazhou to help revolutionize cotton weaving. Notably, Xiuman was also the former fiancée of Qiao'er’s father, Huang Chunyao; however, she broke off their engagement after discovering his infidelity. After finding peace with Feng Jiujin, she finally moves on from her bitter past and retires to Fusang, the Kamakura-era Japan.
Zhao Yue	Nanny Yuan	The weavers' nanny
Amber Xu	Hu Xiaomei	Born in Songjiang Town, Hu Xiaomei was Huang Qiao'er’s childhood friend until her father sold her to a brothel for gamble. She found a second chance when the master weaver Rong Xiuman took her in as an apprentice. Like her avaricious father, Xiaomei is driven by a desire for wealth and status, making her an ambitious social climber. She successfully seduced Emperor Duzong in hopes of becoming a royal consort, but her plan backfired when the jealous Consort Han attempted to have her killed. Though Xiaomei survived, the attack left her right shoulder badly burned and a fear of fire, ending her imperial aspirations. Her life took a turn when she married Fang Po following a one-night stand. She soon became pregnant, though the child’s paternity remained a mystery, as both the Emperor and Fang Po were potential fathers. Tragically, she suffered a miscarriage. However, through years of marriage, Xiaomei developed a genuine love for Fang Po. She eventually became pregnant again, finding redemption and happiness in a child she knew was truly his.
Chen Manyuan	Hu Xiaomei (child)	
Han Xiao	Cheng Nianxiang	She is the senior disciple of Huang Qiao'er. She enjoys bossing around her junior sisters and acting with borrowed authority. While clever, capable, and possessing strong leadership skills, she was once considered by their master, Rong Xiuman, as the successor to the business. However, she eventually betrayed the sect for her own gain to join the Iridescent Cloud Mill, which led Rong Xiuman to ultimately favor Huang Qiao'er.
Shi Jiahe	Cheng Nianxiang (child)	She is the senior disciple of Huang Qiao'er. She enjoys bossing around her junior sisters and acting with borrowed authority. While clever, capable, and possessing strong leadership skills, she was once considered by their master, Rong Xiuman, as the successor to the business. However, she eventually betrayed the sect for her own gain to join the Iridescent Cloud Mill, which led Rong Xiuman to ultimately favor Huang Qiao'er.
Li Jinming	He Xiaoyi	Xiao Yi is Huang Qiao'er's fellow apprentice. At Splendid Mill, she is very talkative. She is lame, and due to her physical disability, she is often mocked and belittled by others. Consequently, she feels unworthy and is always hesitant and timid in her actions; her self-inferiority leads to self-deprecation and a complete lack of self-confidence.
He Siying	He Xiaoyi (child)	Xiao Yi is Huang Qiao'er's fellow apprentice. At Splendid Mill, she is very talkative. She is lame, and due to her physical disability, she is often mocked and belittled by others. Consequently, she feels unworthy and is always hesitant and timid in her actions; her self-inferiority leads to self-deprecation and a complete lack of self-confidence.
Li Qian	Tao Qianqian	Tao Qianqian is a talented and good-hearted weaver and loyal friend to Huang Qiao'er and Fang Po's first love, who fundamentally alters her destiny for the sake of her country. When Princess Zhao Jiayi refuses a political marriage to the Mongol prince Eerde, Qianqian is forced to take her place to avert a diplomatic disaster. Traveling to the Mongol territories under a false identity, she eventually earns the title of Princess Jiashan. Despite the initial deception, she finds unexpected happiness as she wins Eerde’s genuine respect and affection, building a stable life that even the real princess eventually envies.
Li Chen	Tao Qianqian (child)	
Huang Shijia	Xiaoqing	One of Huang Qiao'er's students

=== Song imperial family (House of Zhao) ===
Cast	Role	Description
Cecilia Liu	Zhao Jiayi	An orphaned daughter of the late Emperor Lizong, Zhao Jiayi was raised by Emperor Duzong and is known for her fiery spirit. Originally a willful princess longing for a simpler life, she flatly rejected a high-stakes political marriage to the Mongol prince Eerde, refusing to be a pawn in a diplomatic alliance. This defiance forced her lady-in-waiting and friend, Tao Qianqian, to take her place as a substitute bride. It was only later that Jiayi fell deeply in love with General Lin Mufei, a devotion that sparked a complex struggle for love against another friend, Huang Qiao'er, who was also besotted with him. However, the fall of Lin’an became a definitive turning point; Jiayi shed her royal vanity to become a resilient protector. Mastering dual wielding swordplay and battlefield medicine, she evolved into a warrior-healer for the Song remnants. Even after witnessing the stable happiness Qianqian found with Eerde, Jiayi never regretted her path. She remained steadfastly faithful to Mufei through years of war and unrequited longing until they finally found peace together.
Wang Gang	Emperor Duzong of Song	As Zhao Jiayi's paternal uncle and adoptive father, Emperor Duzong serves as the tragic personification of a dying dynasty. He is a ruler defined by total incompetence, whose inability to govern leaves the Southern Song vulnerable to the Mongol threat.
Chen Ting	Consort E Ling'er	As Zhao Jiayi's maternal aunt and adoptive mother, Consort E represents the moral decay and financial corruption that hollowed out the Song dynasty from within. While her husband is lost to vice, she is driven by a calculating and unscrupulous ambition.
Tang Yifei	Consort Han	As the primary rival to Consort E Ling'er, Consort Han represents the cutthroat nature of palace survival. Unlike those born into nobility, her power is entirely self-made, earned through seduction and manipulation within the inner court.

=== Song imperial court ===
Cast	Role	Description
Justin Yuan	Lin Mufei	Driven by the legendary shadow of Yue Fei, Lin Mufei is a man of rigid honor in a crumbling world. As a leader of the Song resistance, he initially views the world in black and white, rejecting the 'entitled' Zhao Jiayi and longing for the 'simple' Huang Qiao'er. However, the brutality of the Yuan conquest forces him to evolve. He eventually finds a deeper, more resilient love with Jiayi after being heartbroken by Qiao’er’s irresolution, choosing a life of quiet survival over the futile martyrdom he once craved.
Guo Jun	Li Ao	A former second-in-command of Lin Mufei whose hidden resentment curdles into obsession and treason. Driven by a twisted lust for Princess Jiayi and a deep-seated hatred for his former commander, he defects to the Mongol forces to gain the power he craves. He is a predator who uses the chaos of the Song’s fall to commit his most heinous acts—the attempted rape of Jiayi and the cold-blooded murder of Mufei’s mother. He stands as the primary obstacle to the heroes' peace, representing the cruelty of the new Yuan order. Following a series of confrontations, Li Ao is fatally wounded by Lin Mufei and Zhao Jiayi in their final battle before perishing in a winery explosion.
Zhao Yi	Han Tong	A subordinate and comrade-in-arms in Lin Mufei's army. When he was about to be executed, Lin Mufei, Zhao Jiayi, and several anti-Yuan comrades rescued him from the Yuan army in the streets; during the rescue, Zhao Jiayi also suffered an arrow wound.
Ma Fei	Wu Qingtong	A subordinate in Lin Mufei's army. He eventually dies in the Battle of Yamen.
Zhang Lei	Zhao Zhe	A high-ranking official whose predatory nature is hidden behind his judicial robes. Despite his surname, he has no royal blood—a fact that fuels his desire to possess the things (and women) he believes he is entitled to. After almost raping Huang Qiao'er, he defects to the Mongol Yuan government, continuing his reign of corruption. He serves as the primary obstacle to the heroes' justice, representing the dark truth that sometimes the most dangerous enemies are those within the government.
Niu Ben	Eunuch Wang	An attendant in the Imperial Kitchen and a close friend of Lin Mufei. He tries to play matchmaker for Lin Mufei and Huang Qiao'er.

=== Fang Family Dyehouse ===
Cast	Role	Description
Edwin Siu	Fang Ning	Although perfectly compatible with Huang Qiao'er, her lifelong companion Fang Ning—the son of a neighboring dyehouse owner—embodies a love defined by total self-sacrifice, content to be viewed merely as a surrogate older brother. Though he eventually wins Qiao'er's hand in marriage, his journey is one of heartbreaking emotional unfulfillment.
Cheng Pei-pei	Mrs. Fang	The owner of the Fang Family Dyehouse. She is the mother of Fang Jing, Fang Po, and Fang Ning, as well as the mother-in-law of Huang Qiao'er and Hu Xiaomei. She is highly capable; however, she firmly believes that women should adhere to the "Three Obediences and Four Virtues" and follow their husbands after marriage. As she grows older, she becomes increasingly stubborn and traditional. She instructs Huang Qiao'er in dyeing.
Zheng Guolin	Fang Po	The eldest son and heir of the Fang Family Dyehouse, the first romantic interest of Tao Qianqian, and the husband of Hu Xiaomei. He is honest and straightforward by nature; though somewhat slow-witted, he is kind-hearted. When faced with difficulties, Fang Po shoulders the heavy burden of the family business without complaint, setting aside his personal interests to protect the greater good.
He Yan	Fang Jing	Older sister of Fang Po and Fang Ning
He Jianze	Shi Pujie	Nicknamed "Little Stone," he is Fang Jing's former lover. He returns to the Fang Family Dyehouse to take revenge on Fang Pujie, vowing to destroy the workshop to avenge being abandoned in the past.

=== Yazhou ===
Cast	Role	Description
Liu Dong	A'dong	A’dong, a Yazhou native and widower, teaches Huang Qiao’er and Rong Xiuman the art of cotton tillage. His late wife, Dandan—who died years ago during a village plague—is said to have strongly resembled Qiao’er. As A’dong narrates his past, Qiao’er realizes she could have shared a similarly moving experience with Fang Ning. Ultimately, she realizes her obsessive thoughts regarding Lin Mufei blinded her to the life she could have built with Fang Ning.
Guo Xiaoting	Fu Yaya	A'dong's neighbor, who teaches Huang Qiao'er and Rong Xiuman the basics of cotton weaving, which they incorporate with their own knowledge of textile arts. Huang Qiao'er later takes her on as an apprentice, allowing both women to refine their expertise through their combined knowledge.

=== Others ===
Cast	Role	Description
Damian Lau	Feng Jiujin	Known as Feng Jiujin, this character is actually Yelü Ximu, a son of the Khitan noble, Yelü Chucai, and descendant of the Liao dynasty’s royal family. Despite his aristocratic roots, he is a master artisan who becomes a mentor and surrogate father to Huang Qiao'er. By teaching her advanced woodworking and mechanical engineering, he provides the technical foundation for her to invent her revolutionary weaving tools. After years of hardship, he finds love with Rong Xiuman and ultimately retires to Fusang, Kamakura-era Japan. There, he sheds his royal identity to live a peaceful life as a humble teacher.
Ethan Yao	Yelü Ximu (young man)	
Li Qingxiang	Taoist Sun	Sarcastic but wise, Taoist heals Fang Ning and Feng Jiujin
Jerry Cheng	Huang Chunyao	Huang Qiao'er's father and the former fiancé of Rong Xiuman. He betrayed Xiuman by having an affair with Wen Ruolan, a betrayal that resulted in Qiao'er’s conception. Unable to bear the weight of his actions, he eventually died from the physical toll of chronic guilt toward Xiuman when Qiao'er was only six years old.
Dai Chunrong	Mrs. Guan	Mrs. Guan, the ambitious owner of Iridescent Cloud Mill, serves as the ruthless business rival to Rong Xiuman. Consumed by jealousy over Rong’s superior skill and success, she orchestrates a malicious embezzlement scheme designed to trigger a death sentence. However, her treachery backfires into a blessing in disguise; the resulting chaos forces Rong to flee, ultimately allowing her to escape the crushing weight of the Yuan government's early oppression. While Rong finds freedom and innovation in exile, Mrs. Guan’s luck eventually runs out. During the Mongol conquest, she and her weavers are captured and forced into state slavery, their lives reduced to tools for the Yuan court.
Yan Yongxuan	Wang Ying	As Lin Mufei's mother, Wang Ying harbors a deep bitterness toward the imperial court following the loss of her husband and three eldest sons. While she initially favors Huang Qiao'er, she ultimately supports Zhao Jiayi after Qiao'er marries Fang Ning. Despite her deep-seated hatred for the imperial family, she is moved by Jiayi’s unwavering devotion to her son. Tragically, Li Ao murders Wang Ying and the family stewards shortly after the fall of Lin'an. Years later, Mufei and Jiayi uncover her remains and finally provide her with a proper cremation.
Lou Yejiang	Eerde	Prince Eerde was originally betrothed to the Southern Song princess Zhao Jiayi as part of a high-stakes political alliance. His plans were upended when the princess refused the marriage, leading Tao Qianqian—one of the protagonist's fellow weavers—to be forced into taking her place to prevent a diplomatic crisis. Though their union began with a forced deception, Eerde eventually grew to respect and value Qianqian, who successfully embraced her new life as Princess Jiashan in the Mongol territories. Despite later envying the genuine love and stable marriage Qianqian found, Jiayi remains steadfastly faithful to her own love, Lin Mufei.

== Production ==
The Song and Mongol military costumes are originally made for the two television series The Young Warriors (2006) and The Legend of the Condor Heroes (2008).

Originally considered for the part of Huang Qiao'er by the casting department, Cecilia Liu expressed her interest to portray Zhao Jiayi instead, after reading the script. As a result, Janine Chang was chosen for the starring role.

== Deviations from historic accounts ==
In Chinese history, Emperor Lizong and Emperor Duzong of the Song dynasty were actually uncle and nephew. In A Weaver on the Horizon, they are changed to brothers to explain Zhao Jiayi's existence. In reality, Zhao Jiayi never existed and is a fictional character solely created for A Weaver on the Horizon. The screenwriters were unwilling to write Jiayi as the daughter of Duzong due to his well-known corrupted reputations that contributed of fall of the Song dynasty.

Almost all of the characters in the series are fictional except Huang Daopo, Emperor Duzong, Mongol general Bayan, and Yelü Chucai. Most of the plot does not match actual historic accounts. There are references to the death of Emperor Duzong, the succession and abdication of Emperor Gongzong, Battle of Xiangyang, Battle of Yamen and the deaths of the Song's last two emperors; Emperor Duanzong and Emperor Huaizong.

== Deleted scenes ==
Several websites aired different scenes that were deleted from the series:

- Huang Qiao'er first meets the Fang brothers during their childhood.
- Death of A'dong's fiancée Dandan (portrayed by Janine Chang).
- Huang Qiao'er and Rong Xiuman being burned at the stake on Yazhou.
- Lin Mufei and Zhao Jiayi returning home as husband and wife in the series finale.

== Reception ==
The series was well received in mainland China, earning high ratings and acclaim for good performance and a portrayal of inspirational female characters.

== International broadcast ==
Country	Network(s)/Station(s)	Series premiere	Title
Thailand	TPBS	January 27, 2013	ผ้าทอชีวิต (Pha Thor Cheewit; literally Woven Life)
Sri Lanka	Rupavahini	July 4, 2016	සන්නාලියනේ (Sannaliyane)
