= Li Qian (actress) =

Chinese actress

- Born: Li Qian; March 6, 1984 (age 42); Changsha, Hunan, China
- Occupation: Actress
- Years active: 2000 - present
- Musical career
- Label: Huayi Brothers
- Website: Li Qian Fanpage

Li Qian, (Chinese: 李倩; born March 6, 1984) is a Chinese actress and has participated in famous series such as The Country's Granary 《天下粮仓》, Treasure Raiders '02 《萧十一郎》, Happy Princess 《无忧公主》, Twin of Brothers 《大唐双龙传》, Sword of Outlaw 《长剑相思》, and Vagabond Vigilante 《游剑江湖》.

Starting with 2006, she has won much fame since participating in the series River Flows Like Blood 《河流如血》 as the character Tao Fei Fei. Following it, Li Qian became lead female in other series including Nu Ren Xiang (Scent of a Woman) 《女人香》 and Jiang Ji Jiu Ji 《将计就计》, co-starring with Taiwan idol Alec Su You Peng. Wrapping year 2006, Li Qian will also participate in new ancient series Liao Zhai Magnificent Women《聊斋奇女子》with Thai actor TAE.

== Media appearances ==
=== Television ===
- 2000 Mission of the Warriors《武林外史》 (饰: 小泥巴)
- 2000 Li Wei the Magistrate《李衛當官》 (饰: 石榴)
- 2001 Treasure Raiders《萧十一郎》 (饰: 小公子)
- 2001 Love Through Different Times《穿越时空的爱恋》 (饰: 小平)
- 2001 The Country's Granary《天下糧倉》 (饰: 小梳子)
- 2002 Solitary Imperial Guard of Upright Loyal Soul《热血忠魂之独行侍卫》 (饰: 虫儿)
- 2002 Five Daughters Offering Felicitation《新五女拜寿》 (饰：玲珑)
- 2002《太极英雄》 (饰: 陈若廷)
- 2003 Hong Lou Ya Tou《红楼丫头》 (饰: 小红)
- 2003 Happy Princess《无忧公主》 (饰: 无忧公主)
- 2004 Twin of Brothers《大唐双龙传》 (饰: 宋玉致)
- 2005 Assassinator Jingke《荆轲传奇》 (饰: 芄兰公主)
- 2005 Qin Wang Li Shi Min《秦王李世民》 (饰: 红线)
- 2005 Sword of Outlaw《长剑相思》 (饰: 小倩)
- 2005《刘姥姥外传》 (饰：巧姐)
- 2006 Vagabond Vigilante《游剑江湖》 (饰: 吕思美)
- 2006《陆小凤前传》
- 2006 The Phoenix Dances in Nine Heavens《凤舞九天》
- 2006 River Flows like Blood《河流如血》 (饰: 菲菲)
- 2007 Scent of a Woman《女人香》 (饰: 马韵)
- 2007 Jiang Ji Jiu Ji《将计就计》 (飾 毓儿)
- 2007 The Fairies of Liaozhai《聊斋奇女子》之《辛十四娘》(饰: 禄儿)
- 2007《我们生活的年代》(飾: 江小荷)
- 2007 Life Has Tomorrow《生命有明天》
- 2008 Rouge Snow《胭脂雪》 (飾: 阿桃)
- 2008《一千滴眼泪》 饰 林小优
- 2008《生死部落》
- 2008《花篮花儿香》 饰 安娜
- 2009《贤妻良母》 饰 李小英
- 2009《天师钟馗之美丽传说——钟馗嫁妹》 天师钟馗饰 黛黛
- 2009《成长》 饰 小苏
- 2010 A Weaver on the Horizon《天涯織女》(饰: 陶芊芊)
- 2010 Heavenly Ghost Catcher《钟馗传说之降妖伏虎镇》(饰: 紫烟)
- 2010 Growing Up《成长》(饰: 苏甜)
- 2010 Clothing the World
- 2011 The Four Brothers of Peking
- 2011 Heavenly Ghost Catcher
- 2011 The Holy Pearl
- 2011 Educated Youth
- 2011 Beijing Love Story
- 2012 Dreaming Tang Dynasty
- 2012 Legend of Yangliuqing
- 2013 Longmen Express《龙门镖局》(饰：吕青橙)
- 2014 Death Notify Season 1/The Death Notice (暗黑者 / An Hei Zhe)

=== Film ===
- 2005 Lai Bu Ji Ai Ni《来不及爱你》 (饰: 刘倩)
- 2006《爱心》 (饰: 双牛)
- 2012 Back to 1942
- 2013 Saving General Yang
- 2017 Dream Master

=== Music videos ===
- 2004《配角》 (顾海滨)
- 2006《琥珀》 (水木年华)
- 2006《秋日恋歌》 (水木年华)
- 2007《异乡人》 (李健)

== Awards and nominations ==
Year	Award	Category	Nominated work	Result	Ref.
2020	7th The Actors of China Award Ceremony	Best Actress (Sapphire)	—N/a	Pending	
