= The Little Fairy =

Chinese television series

- Poster
- Also known as: Fairy From Wonderland; The Legend of Love
- Genre: Romance; Fantasy
- Based on: Fairy Couple
- Directed by: Lee Kwok-lap
- Starring: Hu Ge; Ariel Lin; Bobby Dou; Cecilia Han; Lu Yi; Tse Kwan-ho; Phyllis Quek
- Opening theme: One Glance, Ten Thousand Years by S.H.E
- Ending theme: Tears of a Thousand Years by Tank
- Composer: Mak Chun Hung
- Countries of origin: China, Singapore and Taiwan
- Original language: Mandarin
- No. of episodes: 39 (Original version) (China and Taiwan version); 30 (Standard version) (Singapore version)

Production
- Producer: Karen Tsoi
- Production locations: China, Singapore and Taiwan
- Running time: 45 minutes per episode
- Production companies: Chinese Entertainment Shanghai, Mediacorp, CEI

Original release
- Network: Chongqing TV (China), Gala Television (Taiwan), Channel U (Singapore)
- Release: 16 January – 9 March 2006

The Little Fairy
- Traditional Chinese: 天外飛仙
- Simplified Chinese: 天外飞仙
- Literal meaning: Fairy From Wonderland
Transcriptions
Standard Mandarin
- Hanyu Pinyin: Tiānwài Fēixiān

The Little Fairy (Chinese: 天外飞仙) is a 2006 Chinese television series based on the legend of the Fairy Couple during the Han dynasty. The series was produced by Mediacorp (Singapore), Chinese Entertainment Shanghai (China) and Taiwanese Film Studio (Taiwan) and premiered on 16 January 2006.

== Synopsis ==
Dong Yong, a kind and diligent man born in the Eastern Han dynasty, is a filial son and a hardworking student, whom his parents were proud of. The Seventh Fairy Maiden, uses the name Yu Xiaoqi, daughter of the Jade Emperor, comes to Earth to meet her second sister's former love, scholar Lao Xinrong. Not knowing Xiaoqi's intention, the Jade Emperor saw this as an opportunity for Xiaoqi to learn more about humans because she is very disobedient and carefree compared to the other daughters. The Jade Emperor chose the Dong family, seeing that Dong is a good person and hopes that the family can guide Xiaoqi to becoming more filial. Fortunately, Dong happens to be one of Lao's students and Xiaoqi is able to get to know more about Lao and Xiaoqi's sister's love even more. Eventually, Dong and the Maiden fall in love, which is forbidden in Heaven and repeats the tragic yet touching history of Dong's teacher, Lao and the Second Fairy Maiden. At the same time, Dong, the Seventh Fairy Maiden, and their friends are on a mission to stop another star-crossed lovers, Dong's classmate, Shangguan Haoqi and Xiang Xuehai, a civet cat deity in human form, before their quest for freedom and selfishness inadvertently triggers an apocalyptic event. After their opposites repent from their evil ways, Dong endures a series of trials to win the approval of the Maiden's family. The Jade Emperor ultimately sees Dong's worth and allows his daughter to marry the mortal, but on the condition that they will only be together for a hundred days. Months after she left, the Maiden gave birth to a baby boy in the celestial palace, and her family asks the Guanyin to entrust the Maiden's newborn son to Dong. Despite their separation, Dong Yong and the Maiden vow never to stop loving one another, even if it means to wait for thousands of lifetimes.

By 2004 in Shanghai, China, Dong has been reincarnated as a contemporary young man. At a street corner, Dong Yong's present avatar meets the Maiden once more, who has once again settled in the mortal realm as a contemporary young woman, implying that she has forsaken her immortality and heavenly status. Regardless of whether he still has memories of his wife from his previous life, Dong Yong falls in love with the Maiden at first sight, suggesting that they will resume their romance.

== Cast ==
- Hu Ge as Dong Yong
- Ariel Lin as Seventh Fairy Maiden (七仙女)
- TAE as Fu Yuanbao (傅元寶)
- Florence Tan as Cuiniang (翠娘)
- Bobby Dou as Shangguan Haoqi (上官浩淇)
- Lv Yi as Li Saijin (李賽金)
- Cecilia Han as Xiang Xuehai (香雪海)
- Tse Kwan-ho as Lao Xinrong (勞欣榮)
- Phyllis Quek as Second Fairy Maiden (二仙女)
- Elvis Tsui as Jade Emperor
- Wu Qianqian as Queen Mother of the West
- Michelle Saram as Ma Nana (馬娜娜)
- Mou Fengbin as Xinba (辛巴)
- Yue Yueli as Dong Qianfa (董千發)
- Li Qinqin as Dong Wenpin (董文聘)
- Li Yoyo as Eldest Fairy Maiden (大仙女)
- Zhang Huan as Third Fairy Maiden (三仙女)
- Wan Yan as Fourth Fairy Maiden (四仙女)
- Wang Jingluan as Fifth Fairy Maiden (五仙女)
- Li Yiling as Sixth Fairy Maiden (六仙女)
- Yan Yongxuan as Shangguan Nianzu (上官念祖)
- Wang Lei as Li Meifeng (李美鳳)
- Zhao Liang as Fu Shan (傅善)
- Zhao Yi as Erlang Shen
- He Sirong as Guanyin
- Lu Dingyu as Earth Deity
- Yang Guang as Pui Ying Academy's headmaster
- Guo Qiming as Serpent Demon
- Han Zhi as The Brute of Lin'an

== Soundtrack ==
The Little Fairy Original Soundtrack (天外飛仙電視原聲帶)

Soundtrack album by Various Artists
- Released: February 10, 2006
- Genre: Soundtrack
- Length: 1:11:53
- Label: HIM International Music

The Little Fairy Original Soundtrack (天外飛仙電視原聲帶)
No.	Title	Length
1.	"Yiyan Wannian (一眼萬年; One Glance, Ten Thousand Years) - by S.H.E"	4:29
2.	"Qiannian Lei (千年淚; Tears of a Thousand Years) - by Tank"	4:20
3.	"Tianliang Yihou (天亮以後; After Dawn) - by Hu Ge"	4:22
4.	"Yuyan (預言; Prophecy) - by Z-Chen"	4:40
5.	"Guling Jingguai (古靈精怪; Quirky) - by Wu Ailun and Lin Jingru"	4:00
6.	"Yueguang (月光; Moonlight) - by Hu Ge"	4:19
7.	"Masang Shu - Yiyan Wannian (馬桑樹 - 一眼萬年 演奏曲; Coriaria Tree - Instrumental version of "A Vision of Eternity")"	4:31
8.	"Tianzhi Ya Haizhi Jiao - Qiannianlei (天之涯 海之角 - 千年淚 演奏曲; The Edge of the Sky and the Corner of the Sea - Instrumental version of "Tears of a Thousand Years")"	3:29
9.	"Yongheng De Ai - Yiyan Wannian (永恆的愛 - 一眼萬年 演奏曲; Eternal Love - Instrumental version of "One Glance, Ten Thousand Years")"	4:27
10.	"Xiaoshide Denghuo - Yueguang (消逝的燈火 - 月光 演奏曲; Fading Light - Instrumental version of "Moonlight")"	4:07
11.	"Ai Chaoyue Tiande - Qiannian Lei (愛超越天地 - 千年淚 演奏曲; Love Transcends Heaven and Earth" Instrumental version of "Tears of a Thousand Years)"	3:28
12.	"Tongku De Xingfu (痛苦的幸福 - 一眼萬年演奏曲; "Bliss of Pain" - Instrumental version of "One Glance, Ten Thousand Years")"	3:20
13.	"Xianfan Zhi Ai (仙凡之愛 - 配樂; "Love of Immortal and Mortal" - Score)"	3:28
14.	"Conglaimeiyouaiguoni (從來沒有愛過你 配樂; "Never Loved You" - Score )"	4:09
15.	"Tian Duo Gao (天多高 - 配樂; "How High Is the Sky" - Score)"	4:12
16.	"Caihong Wuqu (彩虹舞曲 - 配樂; "Rainbow Dance" - Score)"	2:02
17.	"Erlang Shen (二郎神 - 配樂; "Erlang Shen" - Score)"	2:32
18.	"Qi zhi (棋只 - 配樂; "Qi Only" - Score)"	3:04
19.	"Qingwei Shi (情未逝 - 配樂; "Love Does Not Die" - Score)"	2:43
Total length:		01:11:53
