= Hu Ge =

Chinese actor and singer (born 1982)

- 胡歌
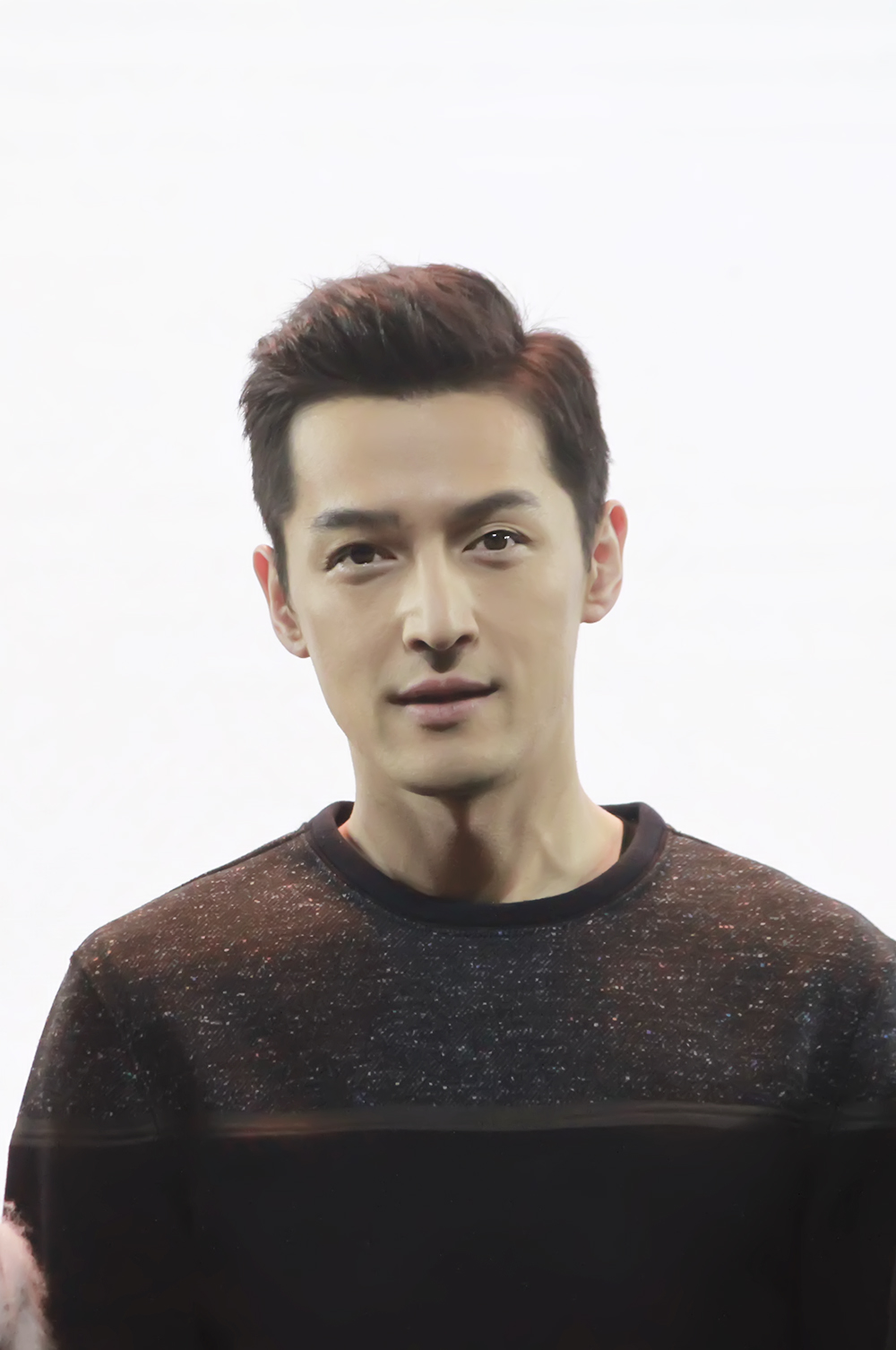
- Hu in 2016
- Born: 20 September 1982 (age 44); Xuhui District, Shanghai, China
- Other names: Hugh Hu, Hugo Hu
- Education: Shanghai Theatre Academy
- Occupations: Actor; singer; record producer
- Years active: 2004–present
- Agent: Hu Ge Studio (under Tangren Media)
- Spouse: Huang Xining (m. 2023)
- Children: 1
- Musical career
- Genre: Mandopop
- Instrument: Vocals
- Label: Gold Typhoon

Chinese name
- Chinese: 胡歌
Transcriptions
Standard Mandarin
- Hanyu Pinyin: Hú Gē
Yue: Cantonese
- Jyutping: Wu^{4} Go^{1}

Hu Ge (Chinese: 胡歌, born 20 September 1982), also known as Hugh Hu or Hugo Hu, is a Chinese actor and singer. He is the recipient of numerous accolades, including two Magnolia Awards and a Golden Eagle Award. Hu rose to fame for his role as Li Xiaoyao in Chinese Paladin (2005), and has since starred in a succession of popular television series, such as The Little Fairy (2006), The Legend of the Condor Heroes (2008), Chinese Paladin 3 (2009), The Myth (2010), Sound of the Desert (2014), The Disguiser (2015), and Born to Be Alive (2026). He also starred in the films The Wild Goose Lake (2019), All Ears (2023), and G for Gap (2024).

Hu won the Magnolia Award for Best Actor and the Golden Eagle Award for Best Actor for his performance in Nirvana in Fire (2015). He received his second Magnolia Award for Best Actor for Blossoms Shanghai (2023).

== Early life and education ==
Hu was born in Xuhui District, Shanghai, on 20 September 1982. His father was a tennis coach and his mother was a teacher. He received his first training in performing arts in Little Stars Performing Arts School run by Shanghai Media Group (SMG). Hu attended Shanghai Xiang Yang Elementary School (1989–94) and Shanghai No.2 High School (1994–2001).

At age 14, Hu started to host a popular TV show Sunshine Youth on Shanghai TV Education Channel for three years. Meanwhile, he was also selected to host a program in East Radio Shanghai. Hu began his acting career by appearing in TV commercials, which helped him gain financial independence before graduating from high school.

In 2001, Hu was admitted to the Central Academy of Drama and Shanghai Theatre Academy; he decided to attend the latter, where he befriended classmate Justin Yuan.

== Career ==
=== 2002–2006: Beginnings and rise to fame ===
While he was still studying, Hu was recommended by his friend to Chinese Entertainment Shanghai (now known as Tangren Media) where he acted as a dub voice actor for the 2002 television drama The Book and the Sword (书剑恩仇录). Following which, he signed on with the company. After appearing in numerous commercials, Hu starred in the film Pretend There's No Feeling (假裝沒感覺) with a minor role. His first television role was in the romance drama Dandelion (蒲公英).

Hu rose to prominence in 2005 when he was cast to play the protagonist Li Xiaoyao in Chinese Paladin, the first television adaptation of the popular adventure role-playing video game The Legend of Sword and Fairy. The television series was a major hit in China and launched Hu to instant fame. The theme song sung by him, "June Rain" was also widely popular. The same year, he also portrayed Ning Caichen in the television series Strange Tales of Liao Zhai.

After Chinese Paladin, Hu embarked on a number of other TV projects, most of which were period dramas and historical fantasies, most notably as Dong Yong in The Little Fairy (2006); based on the Chinese folktale Tian Xian Pei and as Yang Yanzhao in The Young Warriors (2006); based on the play The Generals of the Yang Family. He then starred in the horror film The 601st Phone Call (2006), where he received rave reviews for his performance.

In October 2006, Hu released his first EP, titled Treasure (珍惜).

=== 2008–2012: Comeback after accident and continued success ===
After a hiatus, Hu returned to the screen, reuniting with co-star, Ariel Lin (from The Little Fairy) and starred as Guo Jing in The Legend of the Condor Heroes (2008), adapted from Louis Cha's novel of the same title. Hu was highly praised for his portrayal, along with co-star Ariel Lin. He also co-starred with Wu Chun and Charlene Choi in The Butterfly Lovers (2008), based on the famous Chinese legend Butterfly Lovers.

On 15 May 2008, Hu released his second album, Start (出發), and embarked on his first solo concert in Shanghai.

Hu played three different reincarnations of the main character in Chinese Paladin 3 (2009), while also reprising his role as Li Xiaoyao in a time-travelling cameo appearance. The series, adapted from the third game of The Legend of Sword and Fairy series, achieved high ratings and was awarded the Ratings Contribution Award at the Sichuan Festival.

Hu next starred as the male protagonist in The Myth (2010), based on the 2005 Hong Kong film of the same title. The drama acquired very high viewership ratings, and boosted Hu's popularity to a new high. Hu won the Popularity award at the 1st China Student Television Festival, and Best Actor in the fantasy genre at the 2010 Huading Awards.

To avoid being typecast, Hu subsequently stopped accepting any role in period dramas after he finished filming The Myth. He took on leading roles in modern dramas; Bitter Coffee (苦咖啡, 2011), Modern People (摩登新人类, 2012) and Unbeatable (无懈可击之高手如林, 2012), as well as war drama Shangri-La (香格里拉, 2012). He also starred in the 2011 historical film 1911, playing Lin Juemin, and was nominated as Best New Actor at the 31st Hundred Flowers Awards.

Hu returned to historical fantasies in Xuan-Yuan Sword: Scar of Sky, adapted from the video game of the same name, where he also acted as the series' producer. His excellent portrayal of his character's paradoxical personality earned him another Best Actor in the fantasy genre at the 2012 Huading Awards, as well as the Most Popular Actor award at the 4th China TV Drama Awards. The same year, he participated in CES's nano-movie Refresh 3+7. He wrote the script for one of the stories Lights from the City, and starred in 4 out of the 10 stories.

=== 2013: Forays into theater ===
2013 has often been referred to as Hu's year of theatre plays. He acted as Patient No.5 in Stan Lai's A Dream Like a Dream, which served as the opening act at the 1st Wuzhen Theatre Festival. Hu's performance in A Dream Like A Dream especially surprised many theatre critics, and garnered positive reviews all round. He won the Best Actor award at the 2nd Denny Awards for his performance.

He then starred as Xu Zhuang Tu in Forever Yin Xueyan, a play based on Pai Hsien-yung's novel of the same title performed in the Shanghai dialect. He won the Most Popular Actor award at the Shanghai Culture Center, and the Most Popular Theater Actor of the Year at the BQ Magazine Popular Artists Ceremony.

=== 2014–2016: Career resurgence and critical acclaim ===
In 2014, Hu starred in modern drama Life Revelations alongside Yan Ni, and won the People's Choice award at the 9th Seoul International Drama Awards for his performance. He then starred in historical romance drama Sound of the Desert, based on the novel Ballad of the Desert written by Tong Hua. Originally cast in the role of the leading male role, Hu decided to take on the role of the second male lead instead, as it was a type of character he has never played before. The same year, he garnered a Best Supporting Actor nomination at the 21st Shanghai Television Festival for his performance in acclaimed war drama, Forty Nine Days: Memorial. With three successful dramas, Hu won the Most Popular Actor award at the 6th China TV Drama Awards.

In 2015, Hu starred in espionage drama The Disguiser, which was popular with viewers and received considerably high ratings, with a market share above 8%. This was followed by Nirvana in Fire, a turning point in Hu's acting career, and a commercial and critical success in its own right. Hu won awards at two of the most prestigious television awards in China for his role in Nirvana in Fire. He won Best Actor at the 22nd Shanghai Television Festival; and snagged a double victory by claiming both the Best Actor award and the Most Popular Actor award at the 28th China TV Golden Eagle Award.

He then starred in drama Good Times (大好时光), written by Life Revelations writer Wang Liping. All three of his dramas in 2015 were listed under the "2015 China TV Drama Selection" by the State Administration of Press, Publication, Radio, Film and Television.

In 2016, Hu starred in sports drama Go! Goal! Fighting! as a soccer coach. He returned to the big screen in December 2016, starring as an antagonist in the crime suspense film Cherry Returns. The same year, CBN Weekly crowned him the most commercially valuable actor in China.

=== 2017–present: Hiatus and focus on films ===
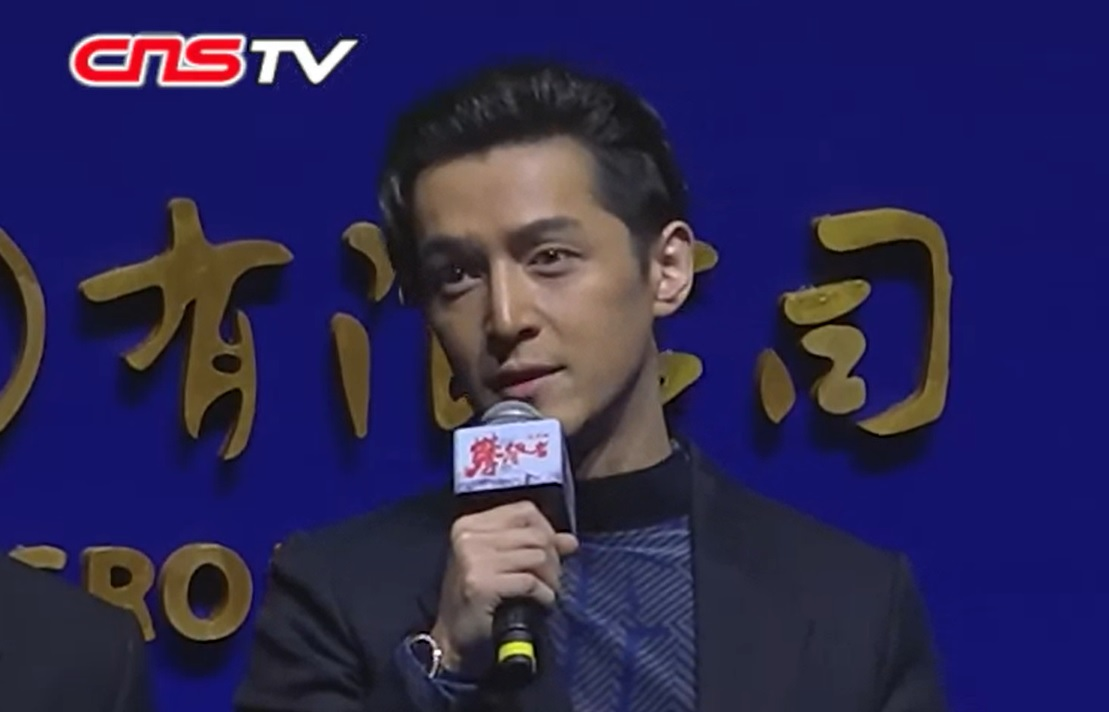
Hu in 2019

The unprecedented surge in popularity in 2015 brought immense pressure. Hu admitted at the end of that year that he wished to take a break from acting. That wish was eventually fulfilled in the spring of 2017. He disappeared from the public eye for much of the year. In 2017, Hu starred in Game of Hunting, a drama produced by critically acclaimed director and screenwriter Jiang Wei. The series was filmed back in 2015 and premiered on Hunan TV in November 2017. Hu was later nominated for the Best Actor award at the Shanghai Television Festival for his role as a headhunter.

In 2018, Hu was cast in Diao Yinan's drama film The Wild Goose Lake. It was selected to compete for the Palme d'Or at the 2019 Cannes Film Festival. The same year, Hu made a guest appearance in romance film Last Letter directed by Shunji Iwai.

In 2019, Hu was cast as the male lead in the sports biographic film about tennis player Li Na, directed by Peter Chan. The same year, he was cast in the adventure drama film The Climbers.

In the winter of 2019, cast in the lead male role, Hu joined co-star Wen Qi in "A Touch of Warm," a crime film directed by Kang Bo. Due to the COVID-19 pandemic, filming was suspended until the winter of 2020. The almost one-year gap rendered many of the finished scenes unusable and had to be re-shot. It wrapped on 22 February 2021, and is currently in post-production.

In 2023, Hu returned to the small screen with drama Blossoms Shanghai directed by Wong Kar-wai, based on the award-winning novel Blossoms by Jin Yucheng. He won his second Magnolia Award for Best Actor for the show, which was also the night's biggest winner by taking home five awards including the Best Television Series.

== Personal life ==
=== Accident ===
Hu was involved in a highway car accident on 29 August 2006 while traveling from Hengdian to Shanghai. According to later interviews, he didn't remember anything from the accident because he was asleep in the passenger seat at the time of the crash and suffered from post-traumatic amnesia. He survived with severe injuries while his assistant died. Hu had to undergo surgeries, some to repair disfiguring wounds to his face, and the entire healing process took approximately one year. The filming of The Legend of the Condor Heroes, which he was working on then, was temporarily halted due to his injury, in addition to being unable to complete promoting his finished project The Young Warriors with his fellow cast members. Hu expresses how he felt of the incident through the performance of his single "Dare to Love", and filmed a music video with his co-star from the two series and friend Cecilia Liu.

After the accident, he published a book Scavenger of Happiness, filled with his thoughts on the accident and post events, interesting childhood events, well wishes from good friends and previously unexposed pictures. This book documented in detail the process of how Hu changed from a young idol with a smooth career path into an increasingly mature actor who could truthfully face life's problems as a scavenger of happiness.

=== Relationships and marriage ===
Hu was in a relationship with actress Xue Jianing from 2006 to 2008, and later with actress Jiang Shuying from 2013 to 2014.

On 31 January 2023, Hu announced on Weibo that he was married and had a newborn daughter. His wife is Huang Xining, who worked as his assistant.

== Filmography ==
=== Film ===
Year	English title	Chinese title	Role	Notes	Ref.
1999	The National Anthem	国歌	Student	Extra	
2002	Pretend There's No Feeling	假装没感觉	Kankan	Cameo	
2005	The Ghost Inside	疑神疑鬼	Shen Lang	Cameo	
2006	The 601st Phone Call	第601个电话	Xiaowen		
2008	The Butterfly Lovers	武侠梁祝	Ma Cheng		
2011	1911	辛亥革命	Lin Juemin	Cameo	
2012	Diva	华丽之后	Hu Ming		
2014	Just Another Margin	大话天仙	Black Emperor's Assassin	Cameo	
2016	Cherry Returns	那年夏天你去了哪里	Yuan Ju	Cameo	
2018	Last Letter	你好，之华	Zhang Chao	Cameo	
2019	The Wild Goose Lake	南方车站的聚会	Zhou Zenong		
2019	The Climbers	攀登者	Yang Guang		
2023	All Ears	不虚此行	Wen Shan		
2024	G for Gap	走走停停	Wu Di		
2025	You Are the Best	你行！你上！	Mr. Hu	Cameo	
2025	Family at Large	三滴血	Zhu Shaoyu		
2026	I Know Who You Are	抓特务	Feng Jingbo		
TBA	Li Na	独自·上场	Jiang Shan		

Animation film

Year	English title	Chinese title	Role	Ref.
1999	Lotus Lantern	宝莲灯		
2011	The Legend of Young Yue Fei	少年岳飞传奇	Yue Fei	
2012	The Monkey King 3D	大闹天宫3D	Wuqu Junxing	
2012	McDull: The Pork of Music	麦兜当当伴我心	McDull (adult)	
2014	Dragon Nest: Warriors' Dawn	龙之谷：破晓奇兵	Velskud	

=== Television ===
Year	English title	Chinese title	Role	Notes	Ref.
2004	Dandelion	蒲公英	Cheng Hao		
2005	Chinese Paladin	仙剑奇侠传	Li Xiaoyao		
2005	Strange Tales of Liao Zhai	聊斋志异	Ning Caichen	Part of story Xiao Qian	
2006	The Little Fairy	天外飞仙	Dong Yong		
2006	Till Death Do Us Apart	别爱我	Xu Feng		
2006	The Young Warriors	少年杨家将	Yang Yanzhao		
2008	The Legend of the Condor Heroes	射雕英雄传	Guo Jing		
2009	Chinese Paladin 3	仙剑奇侠传三	Jing Tian / Feipeng / Long Yang / Li Xiaoyao		
2010	The Myth	神话	Yi Xiaochuan / Meng Yi		
2010	Bitter Coffee	苦咖啡	Chen Cong		
2011	Shangri-La	香格里拉	Zhaxi Dunzhu		
2011	Modern People	摩登新人类	Xie Feifan		
2011	Unbeatable	无懈可击之高手如林	Xu Ran		
2012	Xuan-Yuan Sword: Scar of Sky	轩辕剑之天之痕	Yuwen Tuo	Also executive producer	
2012	Refresh 3+7	刷新3+7	Chen Jie / Luo Yueran / Er Zhuzi / Policeman	Also writer	
2014	iPartment 4	爱情公寓4	Di Nuo	Cameo	
2014	Life Revelations	生活启示录	Bao Jiaming		
2014	Sound of the Desert	风中传奇	Mo Xun		
2014	Forty Nine Days: Memorial	四十九日·祭	Dai Tao		
2015	The Disguiser	伪装者	Ming Tai		
2015	Nirvana in Fire	琅琊榜	Mei Changsu / Su Zhe / Lin Shu		
2015	Good Times	大好时光	Yuan Hao		
2016	Go! Goal! Fighting!	旋风十一人	Mu Qi		
2017	Surgeons	外科风云	Hu	Cameo	
2017	Game of Hunting	猎场	Zheng Qiudong		
2022	Bright Future	县委大院	Mei Xiaoge		
2023	Blossoms Shanghai	繁花	A Bao / Mr. A		
2026	Born to be Alive	生命树	Duo Jie	Special appearance	

== Theater ==
Year	English title	Chinese title	Role	Notes
2013	Dream Like a Dream	如梦之梦	Patient No.5	Reprised: 2014, 2015, 2016, 2017, 2018, 2019, 2021 (total 104 shows)
2013	Forever Yin Xueyan	永远的尹雪艳	Xu Zhuangtu	

== Discography ==
=== Albums ===
Year	English title	Chinese title	Notes/Ref.
2006	Treasure	珍惜胡歌	EP
2008	Start	出发	
2010	Blue Ray	蓝光	

=== Singles ===
Year	English title	Chinese title	Album	Notes/Ref.
2005	"June Rain"	六月的雨	Chinese Paladin OST	
2005	"Xiao Yao Sighs"	逍遥叹	Chinese Paladin OST	
2006	"After Dawn"	天亮以后	The Little Fairy OST	
2006	"Moonlight"	月光	The Little Fairy OST	
2006	"Loving You Will Not Change"	爱你不会变	Till Death Do Us Apart OST	
2006	"One Moment of Forever"	一刻永远	Till Death Do Us Apart OST	
2007	"Tell Him I Love Her"	告诉他我爱她	The Young Warriors OST	
2008	"Dark Clouds"	乌云然	The Legend of the Condor Heroes OST	
2009	"Forgot the Time"	忘记时间	Chinese Paladin 3 OST	
2009	"Bachelor"	光棍	Chinese Paladin 3 OST	
2009	"Dare to Love"	敢不敢爱	—N/a	Theme song for Fantasy Zhu Xian
2010	"Endless Love"	美丽的神话	The Myth OST	with Michelle Bai
2010	"The Opening of the World and Plum Blossoms"	天地梅花開	The Vigilantes in Masks OST	
2011	"One Persistent Thought"	一念执着	Scarlet Heart OST	with Alan
2011	"I Won't Be a Hero"	我不做英雄	—N/a	Theme song for 'Dreaming Deer Online
2011	"Expert"	高手	Unbeatable OST	
2012	"Kiss until the end of Time"	一吻天荒	Xuan-Yuan Sword: Scar of Sky OST	
2012	"Fingerprint"	指纹	Xuan-Yuan Sword: Scar of Sky OST	
2012	"One Piece of Story"	一篇故事	Refresh 3+7 OST	
2014	"Moving On"	好好过	Sound of the Desert OST	
2015	"When the Wind Blows"	风起时	Nirvana in Fire OST	
2017	"Bloom"	盛開	Game of Hunting OST	
2019	"Beautiful Solo River"	美丽的梭罗河	The Wild Goose Lake Soundtrack	

=== Other appearances ===
Year	English title	Chinese title	Notes/Ref.
2017	"At This Moment"	在此刻	Performance for CCTV New Year's Gala

== Bibliography ==
Year	English title	Chinese title	ISBN	Ref.
2006	Scavenger of Happiness	幸福的拾荒者	9787807328483	

== Endorsements and ambassadorship ==
Following his surge in popularity and public awareness, Hu has also been appointed the Shanghai Tourism Ambassador in 2015. Professional designers from Madame Tussauds Shanghai took measurements from Hu to make two wax figures of him; one of himself and one of his character Mei Changsu from Nirvana in Fire, which was unveiled in September 2016.

In 2016, Hu was named brand ambassador of Emporio Armani in China and Asia Pacific. In the same year, he also became brand ambassadors for Piaget Chanel Perfume and Cosmetics, and EF Education First.

In 2020, Hu was promoted from regional ambassador to global ambassador of Giorgio Armani, the first actor to hold such a title.

== Accolades ==
=== Awards and nominations ===
Year	Award	Category	Nominated work	Result	Ref.
Major awards
2011	31st Hundred Flowers Awards	Best New Actor	1911	Nominated	
2015	21st Shanghai Television Festival	Best Supporting Actor	Forty Nine Days: Memorial	Nominated	
2015	30th Flying Apsaras Awards	Outstanding Actor	The Disguiser, Nirvana in Fire	Nominated	
2016	22nd Shanghai Television Festival	Best Actor	Nirvana in Fire	Won	
2016	28th China TV Golden Eagle Awards	Audience's Choice for Actor	Nirvana in Fire	Won	
2016	28th China TV Golden Eagle Awards	Most Popular Actor	Nirvana in Fire	Won	
2018	24th Shanghai Television Festival	Best Actor	Game of Hunting	Nominated	
2023	28th Shanghai Television Festival	Best Actor	Bright Future	Nominated	
2023	25th Shanghai International Film Festival	Best Actor	All Ears	Won	
2024	29th Shanghai Television Festival	Best Actor	Blossoms Shanghai	Won	
2024	34th Flying Apsaras Awards	Outstanding Actor	Bright Future, Blossoms Shanghai	Nominated	
2024	32nd China TV Golden Eagle Awards	Best Actor	Blossoms Shanghai	Nominated	
Film, television & theater awards
2006	2nd Enlight Media Chinese TV Drama Awards	Most Popular Actor	Chinese Paladin	Won	
2006	2nd Enlight Media Chinese TV Drama Awards	Most Promising Newcomer (Mainland China)	Chinese Paladin	Won	
2006	Tencent Star Awards	Top 4 Most Popular Actor	—N/a	Won	
2006	Tencent Star Awards	Most Promising Film Actor	The 601st Phone Call	Won	
2009	Fujian TV Station "I Love My Drama" Award Ceremony	Ratings Contribution Award	The Little Fairy, Till Death Do Us Apart, The Legend of the Condor Heroes	Won	
2009	Fujian City Association Television Award Ceremony	Most Popular Actor	The Legend of the Condor Heroes	Won	
2010	Sohu Internet TV Festival (Spring)	Most Popular Actor	Chinese Paladin 3, The Myth	Won	
2010	1st China Student Television Festival	Most Popular Actor	The Myth	Won	
2010	4th Huading Awards	Best Actor (Fantasy Drama)	The Myth	Won	
2011	Youku Television Awards	Most Popular Actor	Chinese Paladin 3, Unbeatable	Won	
2011	6th Huading Awards	Best Actor (Fantasy Drama)	Shangri-La	Nominated	
2011	3rd China TV Drama Awards	Most Popular Actor (Mainland China)	Unbeatable	Won	
2012	8th Huading Awards	Best Actor (Fantasy Drama)	Xuan-Yuan Sword: Scar of Sky	Won	
2012	4th China TV Drama Awards	Popular Actor Award	Xuan-Yuan Sword: Scar of Sky	Won	
2013	4th China Student Television Festival	Most Popular Actor	Xuan-Yuan Sword: Scar of Sky	Won	
2013	2nd Denny Awards in Beijing for the international excellence in theatrical arts	Best Actor	A Dream Like A Dream	Won	
2013	Shanghai Culture Square	Most Popular Lead Actor	Forever Yin Xueyan	Won	
2013	BQ Weekly Awards	Theater Actor of the Year	Forever Yin Xueyan, A Dream Like A Dream	Won	
2014	9th Seoul International Drama Awards	Most Popular Actor	Life Revelations	Won	
2014	4th China TV Drama Awards	Most Popular Actor	Sound of the Desert, Life Revelations	Won	
2015	2nd Hengdian Film and TV Festival of China	Best Actor	The Disguiser	Won	
2015	Asia Television Drama Conference	Special Contribution Award	Life Revelations, Good Times	Won	
2015	iQIYI All-Star Carnival	Best Television Actor	Nirvana in Fire, The Disguiser, Good Times	Won	
2015	2015 Good Actor Selection	Outstanding Actor	—N/a	Won	
2015	7th China TV Drama Awards	Best Actor	Nirvana in Fire	Won	
2016	19th Huading Awards	Best Actor	Nirvana in Fire	Nominated	
2016	19th Huading Awards	Best Actor (Contemporary Drama)	Good Times	Nominated	
2016	1st China Quality Television Drama Ceremony	Grand Award for Best Performance	Nirvana in Fire, The Disguiser, Good Times	Won	
2016	1st China Quality Television Drama Ceremony	Most Marketable Actor	Nirvana in Fire, The Disguiser, Good Times	Won	
2016	2016 LITV OTT Drama Awards	Drama Actor of the Year	—N/a	Won	
2016	3rd The Actors of China Award Ceremony	Best Actor (Emerald)	—N/a	Won	
2017	2nd China Quality Television Drama Ceremony	Outstanding Quality Star	—N/a	Won	
2017	Big Ben Award	Most Revered Lead Actor	Go! Goal! Fighting!	Won	
2020	27th Huading Awards	Best Actor	The Wild Goose Lake	Nominated	
2024	Asia Contents Awards & Global OTT Awards	Best Lead Actor	Blossoms Shanghai	Won	
Music awards
2005	BTV-MTV Style Gala	New Force Award	—N/a	Won	
2005	Tiandi Yingxiong List	Achievement Award	—N/a	Won	
2007	5th China Original Song Award	Outstanding Television Theme Song	"June Rain"	Won	
2008	6th China Original Song Award	Newcomer Award	—N/a	Won	
2010	Baidu Entertainment Fudian	Most Popular Game Theme Song	"Dare to Love"	Won	
2017	Tencent Entertainment White Paper (Music Edition)	Top 10 Most Popular Film/Television Soundtracks	"Bloom"	Won	
Miscellaneous awards
2004	Dongfang Newcomer Award Ceremony	New Trend Idol Award	—N/a	Won	
2010	Maison Shanghai Award Ceremony	Trend Figure of the Year	—N/a	Won	
2011	Femina IT Award	IT Style Guy	—N/a	Won	
2011	Cosmo Beauty Award Ceremony	Style Award	—N/a	Won	
2011	Grazia Magazine Third Anniversary Award Ceremony	Fashion Breakthrough Award	—N/a	Won	
2012	China Fashion Award	Popularity Pioneer Figure	—N/a	Won	
2015	"Wind From The East" Entertainment Influence Awards	Influential Figure of the Year	—N/a	Won	
2015	Elle Style Awards	Idol of the Year	—N/a	Won	
2015	Elle Style Awards	UC Hot Search Figure	—N/a	Won	
2015	NetEase Attitude Award	Male God Award	—N/a	Won	
2016	2015 Powerstar Award Ceremony	Most Popular Actor (Mainland) China)	—N/a	Won	
2016	GQ Men of the Year	Most Influential Actor	—N/a	Won	
2017	Tencent Entertainment White Paper (Celebrity Edition)	Most Commercial Valuable Celebrity	—N/a	Won	
2017	Communist Youth League	Outstanding Youth Award	—N/a	Won	
2019	GQ 2019 Men of the Year	Top Ten Influential Figures	—N/a	Won	

=== Forbes China Celebrity 100 ===
Year	Rank	Ref.
2006	90th	
2007	50th	
2015	63rd	
2017	18th	
2019	3rd	
2020	24th	
