= Lin Juemin =

Chinese revolutionary

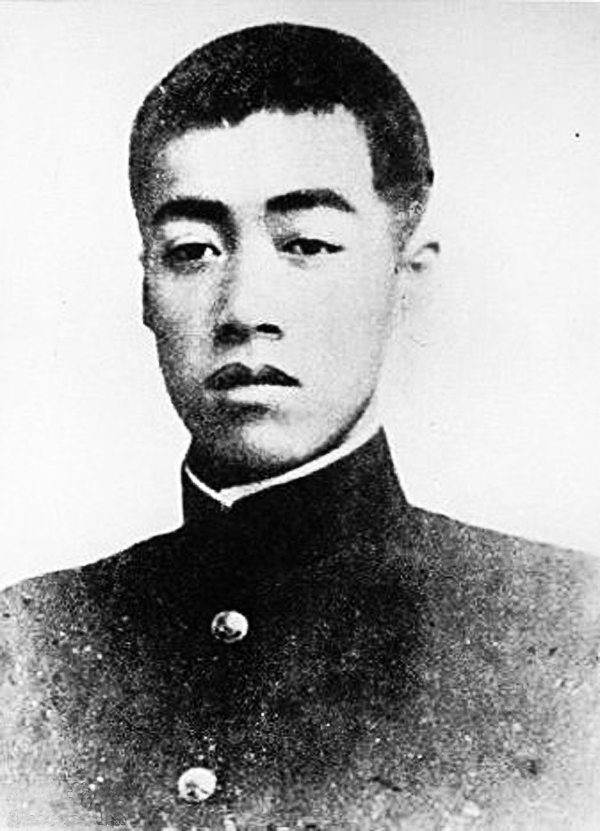
- Born: Lin Juemin; 11 August 1887; Minhou, Fujian, Qing Empire
- Died: 27 April 1911 (aged 23); Guangzhou, Qing Empire
- Cause of death: Execution
- Alma mater: Keio University
- Relatives: Chen Yiying (wife)
- Military career
- Allegiance: Tongmenghui
- Branch: Tongmenghui
- Service years: 1911
- Conflicts: Second Guangzhou Uprising (executed)

Lin Juemin
- Traditional Chinese: 林覺民
- Simplified Chinese: 林觉民
Transcriptions
Standard Mandarin
- Hanyu Pinyin: Lín Juémín

Lin Juemin (traditional Chinese: 林覺民; simplified Chinese: 林觉民; pinyin: Lín Juémín; Wade–Giles: Lin Chüeh-min; born 11 August 1887 – 27 April 1911) was a late Qing dynasty revolutionary.

== Biography ==
In 1907, Lin traveled to Japan to study at Keio University, where he joined Dr. Sun Yat-sen's revolutionary group, the Tongmenghui. Lin attempted to begin a popular revolution in 1911 in Guangzhou after returning to his native Fujian, but he was arrested and his revolution failed. 3 days before his capture, he wrote his famous "Letter of Farewell to my Wife", which is considered an important work of Chinese writing of the early 20th century. He was remembered as a revolutionary martyr after his death.

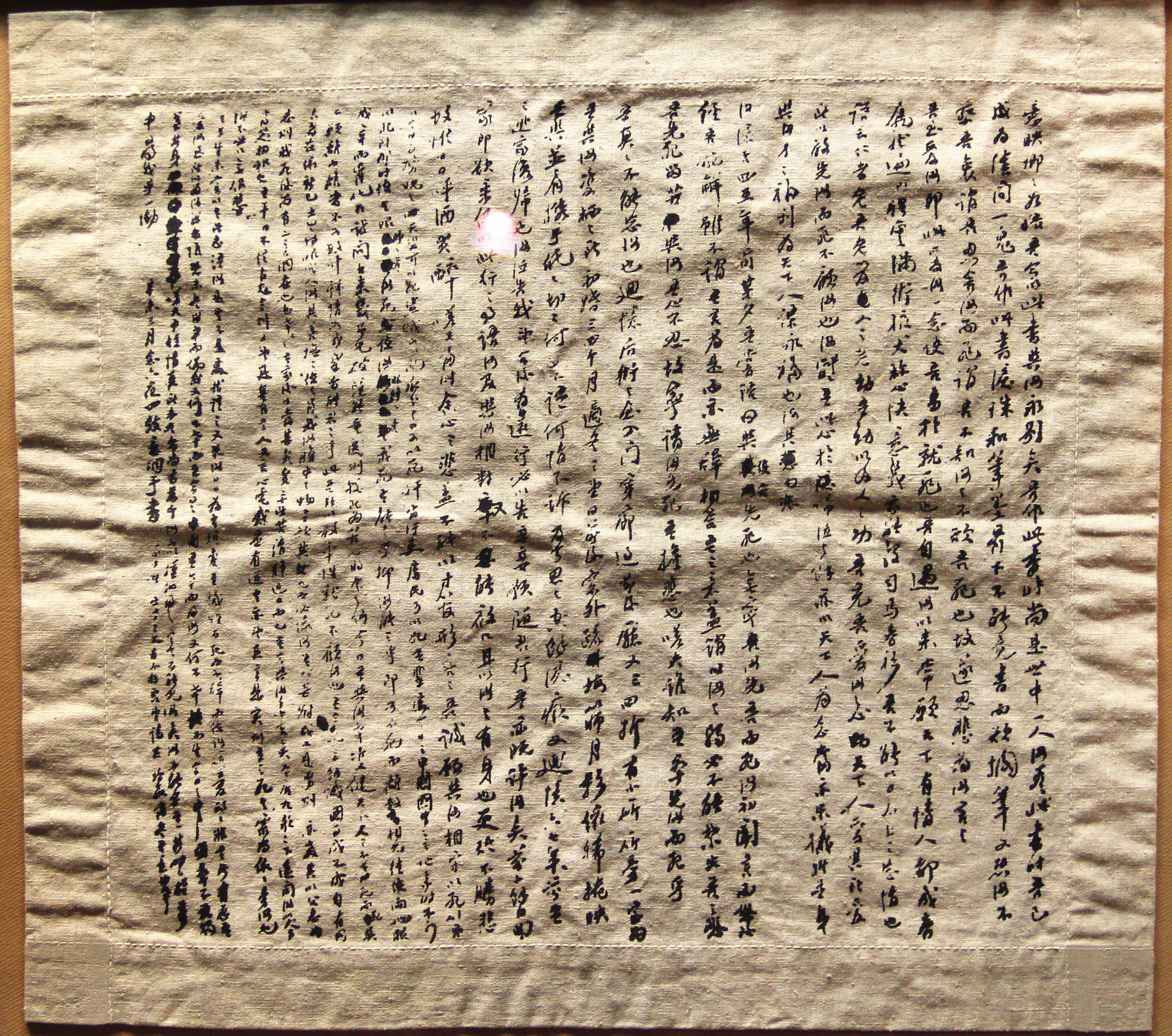
On the eve of battle, he wrote the legendary "Letter of Farewell to My Wife" (與妻訣別書), later to be considered as a masterpiece in Chinese literature.

American artist Maya Lin is related to him.

== In popular culture ==
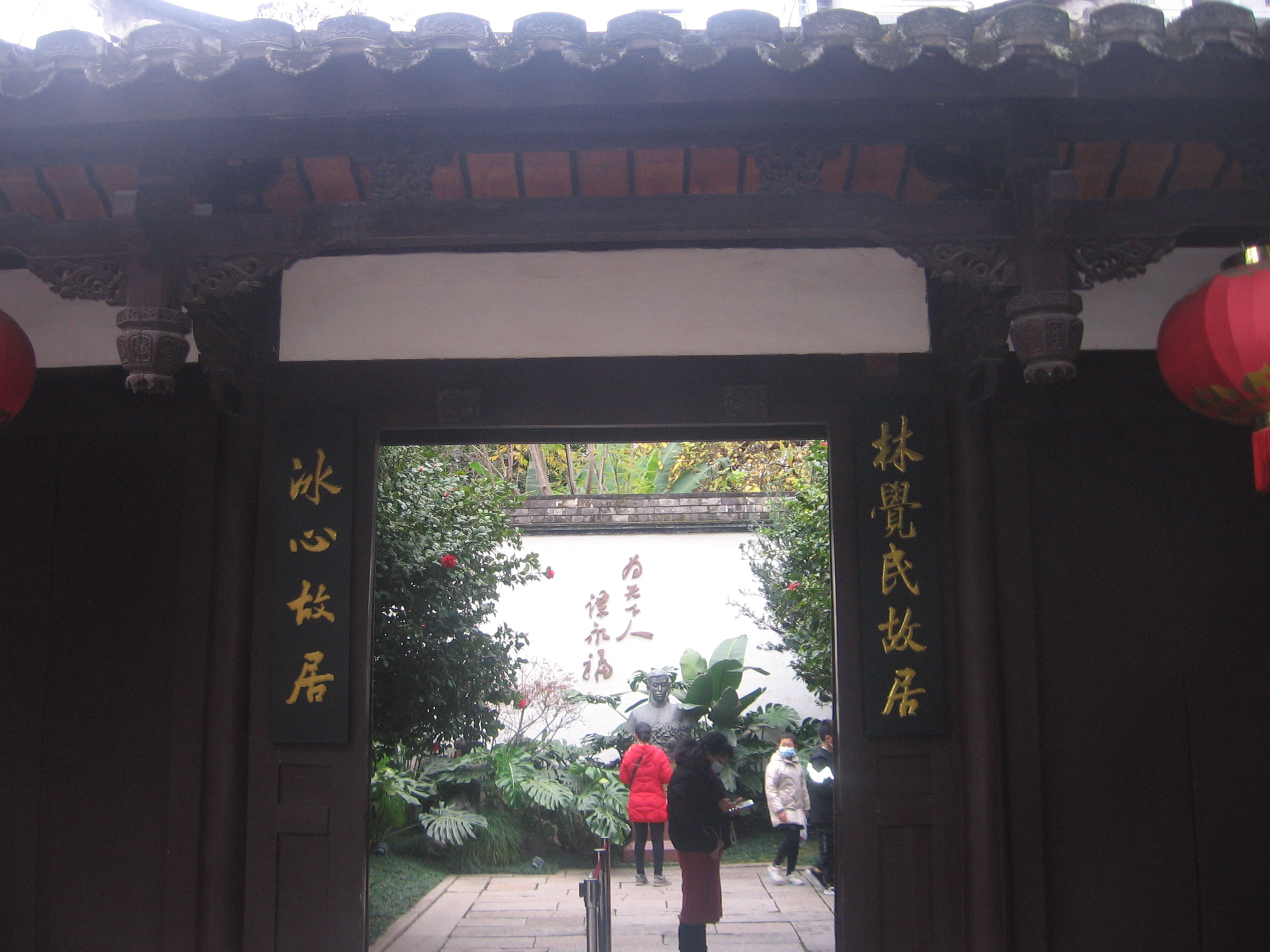
Former residence of Lin Juemin in Fuzhou.

- Tu Kuang-chi starred as Lin Juemin in the 1954 film The 72 Martyrs of Canton.
- Chou Shao-tung starred as Lin Juemin in the 1980 film Magnificent 72.
- Hu Ge portrayed Lin Juemin in the 2011 film 1911.

== See also ==
- Second Guangzhou Uprising

== Bibliography ==
- Lee Khoon Choy (2005). Pioneers of Modern China: Understanding the Inscrutable Chinese (illustrated ed.). World Scientific. p. 12. ISBN 981256618X.
