= The Young Warriors (TV series) =

2006 Chinese TV series

- Promotional poster featuring the main cast members
- 少年杨家将
- Genre: Costume drama; Wuxia; Romance
- Based on: The Generals of the Yang Family
- Written by: Wang Li; Zhang Mian
- Directed by: Lee Kwok-lap
- Presented by: Wang Zhongjun
- Starring: Hu Ge; Peter Ho; Eddie Peng; Justin Yuan; Chen Long; He Jianze
- Opening theme: "Farewell Poem" (诀别诗) by Anson Hu
- Ending theme: "Twenty Years" (二十年) by Zhang Mengmeng
- Composer: Mak Chun-hung
- Country of origin: China
- Original language: Mandarin
- No. of episodes: 43

Production
- Producers: Karen Tsoi; Wang Zhonglei
- Production location: China
- Running time: ≈45 minutes per episode
- Production companies: Chinese Entertainment Shanghai; Huayi Brothers Media Corporation

Original release
- Network: China Television
- Release: 26 September 2006

The Young Warriors (少年杨家将) is a 2006 Chinese costume drama television series based on stories in The Generals of the Yang Family collection. The series was jointly produced by Chinese Entertainment Shanghai and Huayi Brothers Media Corporation, starring an ensemble cast from mainland China, Hong Kong and Taiwan.

== Synopsis ==
In the 980s, former Later Han general Yang Ye pledges allegiance to Emperor Taizong of the Song Empire. He leads his family and followers to defend Song from invasion by the Khitan-led Liao Empire. Having served Song for years, the Yangs are viewed as an honorable, courageous and patriotic clan who protects the empire from foreign invasion.

At the Battle of Golden Beach, the Yangs fall for a conspiracy, which concludes with the deaths of Yang Ye and four of his sons, and another son becoming a prisoner-of-war. Yang Ye's last two surviving sons, Yang Yanzhao and Yang Yande, continue their family's legacy of defending the Song Empire while seeking vengeance on the conspirators.

== Cast ==
- Hu Ge as Yang Yanzhao
  - Leo Wu as Yang Yanzhao (younger)
- Lin Chia-yu as Chai Meirong
- Peter Ho as Yang Yanhui
  - Li Hangye as Yang Yanhui (younger)
- Cecilia Liu as Lady Luo
- Chen Long as Yang Yande
- Wei Xiaojun as Guan Hong
- Eddie Peng as Yang Yansi
- Liu Xiaojie as Xiaolin / Du Jin'e
- Weng Chia-ming as Yang Ye
- Amy Chan as She Saihua
- Zhao Zicun as Yang Yanqi
- Ethan Li as Yang Yanping
- Chen Jie as Zhang Jinding
- Song Yang as Yang Yanding
- Chen Lili as Yun Cuiying
- Wang Xiaoming as Yang Yan'an
- Li Yinning as Luo Sumei
- Tong Yao as Pan Ying
- Deng Limin as Pan Renmei
- He Jianze as Pan Bao
- Li Jie as Zhao Kuangyi (Emperor Taizong)
- Zong Fengyan as Zhao Defang
- Wen Haibei as Zhao Kuangyin (Emperor Taizu)
- Zhou Haodong as Cui Yinglong
- Zhang Bojun as Kou Zhun
- Justin Yuan as Yelü Xie
- Ba Yin as Tianling
- Guo Qiming as Xiahou Zhan
- Wang Lei as Madam Hua
- Wu Jiani as Yelü Qiong'e (Princess Yinjing)
- Zhang Ruijia as Empress Dowager Xiao
- Yang Guang as Mr. Zhuge

== Production ==
The series' war segments were later reused in The Legend of the Condor Heroes (2008) for the flashback scene depicting Yang Zaixing's death. The filmmakers obscured the actors' features to differentiate the two television series, but the images' compositions are the same.

The series' costume design is one of its main focal points. During its premiere, the production team hosted runway events for cast members to showcase their costumes. The Yang generals and Yelü Xie's costumes were designed based on battle armour from the Tang, Song and Liao dynasties. However, the Yangs' armour attracted the most attention, as audiences felt that they resembled samurai armour more than Chinese armour, because of their bright red and black colouring, and long narrow plates. The Song military uniform designs were featured again in The Legend of the Condor Heroes (2008) and A Weaver on the Horizon (2010).

== Soundtrack ==
The Young Warriors Original Soundtrack (电视原声大碟：少年杨家将)

Soundtrack album (Audio CD/Digital download) by Various artists
- Released: March 14th, 2007
- Length: 53:11
- Label: Shanghai Step-Up Gale Music Culture Media

=== Track listing ===
| No. | Title | Artist | Length |
|---|---|---|---|
| 1. | "A Man Should Better Himself (男儿当自强)" | | 3:13 |
| 2. | "Farewell Poem (诀别诗)" | Anson Hu | 4:06 |
| 3. | "Realise (悟)" | | 3:10 |
| 4. | "Farther and Farther (越走越远)" | Zhao Mo | 4:15 |
| 5. | "Yanmen Pass (雁门关)" | | 3:44 |
| 6. | "Whisking Sleeves (拂袖)" | Anson Hu | 4:30 |
| 7. | "Little Eighth Sister (小八妹)" | | 1:18 |
| 8. | "Farewell Poem (instrumental) (诀别诗 — 演奏曲)" | | 5:09 |
| 9. | "Tell Her I Love Her (告诉他我爱她)" | Hu Ge | 4:09 |
| 10. | "Blue Blood (金枝玉叶)" | | 1:36 |
| 11. | "Gentleness of Both Hands (双手的温柔)" | Wu Yingzai | 4:17 |
| 12. | ""Quiet Spring" (清泉)" | | 2:00 |
| 13. | "Farther and Farther (instrumental) (越走越远 — 演奏曲)" | | 3:55 |
| 14. | "Twenty Years (二十年)" | Zhang Mengmeng | 4:32 |
| 15. | "Haven of Silence (灵静)" | | 3:08 |
| Total length: | | | 53:11 |
