= Huang Daopo =

Chinese textile inventor (c. 1245–1330)

Huang Daopo (simplified Chinese: 黄道婆; traditional Chinese: 黃道婆; pinyin: Huáng Dàopó; c. 1245 – 1330) was a Chinese textile artist, who rose from poverty to become one of the most famous women in the early Chinese textile industry.

== Biography ==
Huang was likely born around 1240 or 1245. Her family name was Huang, and Daopo was an honorific that she was given later in life. Coming from a poverty stricken family, Huang ran away from home when she was ten years old after being sold into marriage by her family. Unable to bear the constant ill-treatment she received, Huang followed the Huangpu River from her home in Songjiang, near Shanghai then boarded a ship bound for the port of Yazhou in Hainan. In Yazhou she learnt spinning and weaving from the local Li people.

Around 1295, Huang returned to Songjiang and began to teach the local women about cotton spinning and weaving technology whilst at the same time manufacturing suits, fine silk fabrics and weaving machinery (such as fluffing machines, crushers and three-spindle treadle powered weaving looms) that greatly increased efficiency. From the weaving aspect, Huang produced mixed cotton fabrics, colored fabrics and fabrics with mixed warp and weft fibers. Her weaving technology made her hometown famous and began its textile manufacturing industry.

== Textile techniques ==
Huang Daopo was a textile pioneer in Yuan Dynasty.

Huang Daopo improved techniques like ginning, stretching, spinning, and weaving. In terms of ginning, she figured out a way to get seeds out of the cotton easily by improving machine called Jiaoche, so that it could spin out three yarns simultaneously by stepping, therefore largely improving the efficiency of the production. In the aspect of stretching, she increased the slingshot's vibration effect on cotton, thus making it more fluffy. Eventually, people found it easier for yarn spinning in the production process. When it comes to spinning, she changed the original structure of the spinning wheel to reduce the possibilities of the yarm to snap. She also improved weaving tools. She made a reformation of the old tools and added functions like pick-weaving and brocading.

In Huang Daopo's hometown, people used to peel the cottonseed by hand, which was slow and troublesome. After she created and invented the new technology, she brought it back to her hometown. By teaching the locals the method of removing seeds by rolling cotton with Jiaoche, her hometown finally got a higher production rate and produced more fine silk fabrics.

== Legacies ==
Huang Daopo invented and spread the technology of cotton textile called Wunijing Technology, based on the cotton textile technology of the Li nationality. It consists of three parts: processing, yarn spinning, and weaving. This improved the efficiency and quality of the cotton textile, brought a huge economic impact to the Yangtze River delta region, and laid a foundation for the agricultural and textile culture in the Yangtze River Delta region.

With the development of Huang Daopo cotton spinning technology for home weaving, women were able to earn more financially. Women had a higher status in marriage and in the family.

== Memorial ==
Shanghai Botanical Garden hosts the Huang Daopo Memorial Hall in her honor. Huang Daopo memorial hall opened in the Xuhui district in Shanghai in 2003. It had a 2.2-meter-high statue of Huang Daopo in the courtyard. On the doorpost, it has a couplet saying "one shuttle goes through the universe, two hands weave cloud clothes". The horizontal inscription is "the world of clothes and quilts" written by Zhou Gucheng.

On November 20, 1980, the Ministry of Posts and Telecommunications of the People's Republic of China published a set of 4 commemorative stamps for scientists, of which Huang Daopo was the fourth one. Huang Daopo the first ancient female scientist appeared on the stamp.

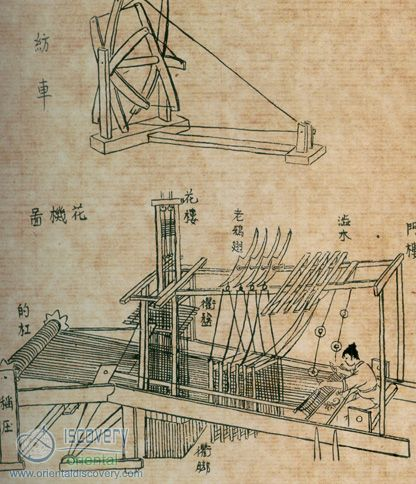
Diagram of Huang's weaving machine

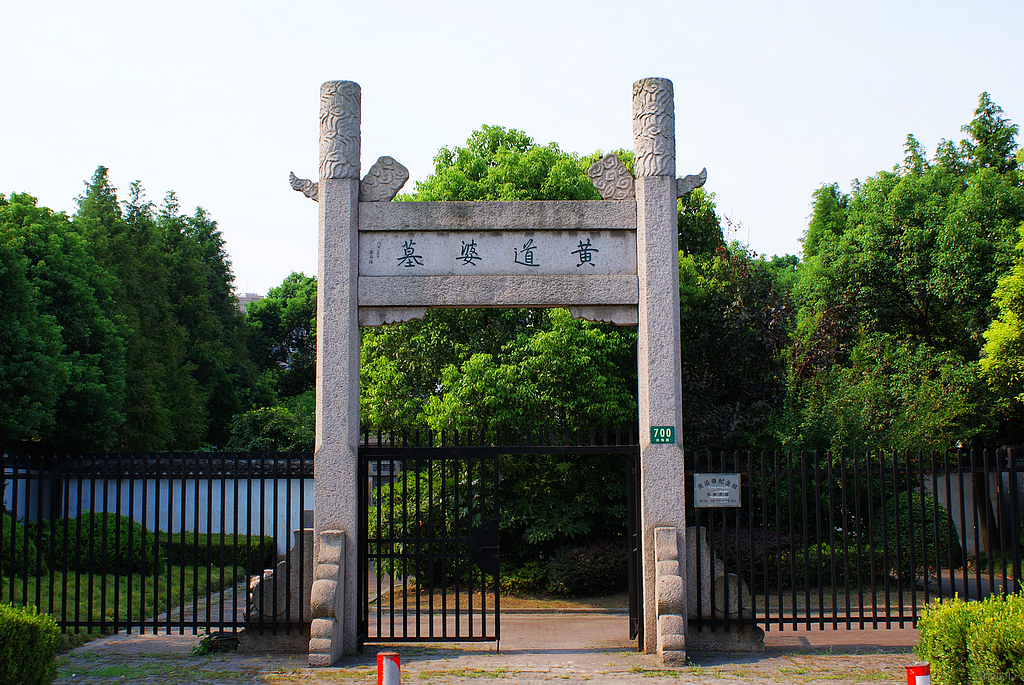
Tomb of Huang Daopo

In 1989, The People's Bank of China published a set of commemorative coins for the outstanding historical figures in China. One of them is with an image of Huang Daopo. The head side is with the national emblem, national number, and year number. On the tail side is the figure of Huang Daopo.

According to the folklore, the sixth of the fourth lunar month is the birthday of Huang Daopo. So this day is also called as "birthday of cotton" in China.

A crater on Venus is named for her.

== Portrayals ==
Huang Daopo is a stage play is directed by Gao Du, a professor of Beijing Dance Academy. It was first performed in Hainan province in China and tells the story of Huang Daopo, who learns and improves the Li People's textile techniques while living on Hainan Island. It consists of seven parts, combining the folk culture of the Li people with the Chinese textile culture, creating a legendary story about Huang Daopo from the collision and intermingling of cultures. Although it incorporates mythology, the main message of the whole play is to praise and celebrate the contribution made by Huang Daopo. Her image in this play is a laborious, kind, dedicated workwoman.

A Weaver on the Horizon is a TV series that tells the story based on the turbulent society at the end of the Song Dynasty and tells the story of Huang Daopo, who was in exile on Hainan Island and learns textile techniques there. She is portrayed in this series as a weaver from a poor family who, despite the injustice she suffered in the palace, still has a heart for the people and selflessly dedicates herself to saving the people in distress.
