= Yu Peilun =

Chinese revolutionary (1887–1911)

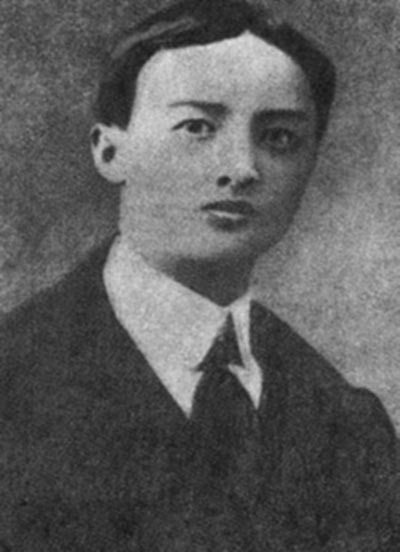
- Yu in 1907
- Native name: 喻培伦
- Born: 1887
- Died: 1911 (aged 23–24)

Yu Peilun also spelled Yu Pei-lun (traditional Chinese: 喻培倫; simplified Chinese: 喻培伦; pinyin: Yù Péilún; Wade–Giles: Yü P'ei-lun; 1887–1911) was a late Qing Dynasty revolutionary. During the 1911 Revolution, he was part of the Chinese students anti-monarchy "Dare to Die" corps of suicide bombers. Yu died in 1911, from detonating explosives while leading a suicidal charge against forces loyal to the Qing government.
