= Cherry Returns =

2016 Chinese-Hong Kong film by Chris Chow

- Poster
- Traditional Chinese: 那年夏天你去了哪裡
- Simplified Chinese: 那年夏天你去了哪里
- Directed by: Chris Chow
- Written by: Chris Chow
- Starring: Song Jia; Gordon Lam; Cherry Ngan
- Music by: Youki Yamamoto
- Production companies: Sil Metropole Organization; EDKO Film; Tianjin Chinese Entertainment; Shanghai Film Group; Yatai Weilai Entertainment (Beijing); EDKO (Beijing) Distribution
- Distributed by: EDKO (Beijing) Distribution (China)
- Release date: 30 December 2016 (China)
- Running time: 89 minutes
- Countries: China; Hong Kong
- Language: Mandarin
- Box office: CN¥33.3 million (China)

Cherry Returns is a 2016 Chinese-Hong Kong suspense crime thriller film directed by Chris Chow and starring Song Jia, Gordon Lam and Cherry Ngan. It was released in China by EDKO (Beijing) Distribution on 30 December 2016. This 89 minutes movie is co-produced by Sil Metropole Organization, EDKO Film, Tianjin Chinese Entertainment, Shanghai Film Group, Yatai Weilai Entertainment (Beijing), and EDKO (Beijing) Distribution.

== Synopsis ==
LAPD receives an anonymous tip off and locates a hideout where they believe young children are being held captive. During the raid, the kidnapping suspects are killed. A traumatized young girl is found alive in the basement, later identified as Cherry, who was abducted 12 years ago. Her family, who has since resided in Hong Kong, feels agitated upon the shocking news. In the wake of the trauma, Cherry appears to lose all recollection of her family and childhood. To cope with the aftermath and get her life back on track, her family takes her back to Hong Kong to start anew.

While Cherry is making progress in recovery, strange events occur that threaten to harm those close to her. Complicated by the appearance of a mysterious stranger, police investigator starts to look into Cherry’s past for lead. But what he is about to discover, no one is prepared for the fatal outcome that follows...

== Cast ==
Actors	Roles
Starring
Song Jia	Jing Yuan
Gordon Lam (credited as Lam Ka-tung)	Inspector Deng
Cherry Ngan	Cherry Yuan
Special Appearance
Hu Ge	Hoodie (Ju Yuan), Yicong's bastard son, a psychotic killer
Co-starring
Chen Kuan Tai (credited as Chan Koon-tai)	Mr. Yuan / Yiming, Jing's & Cherry's father
Josephine Koo (credited as Josephine Ku)	Mrs. Angie Yuan, Jing's & Cherry's mother

Other Cast

Actors	Roles	Actors	Roles
Jason Pai Piao	Yicong Yuan, Yiming's elder brother	Kajica Djuric	Foreign Family (father)
Yip Chun	Cai, butler	Nataliya Gomzyakova	Foreign Family (mother)
Lora Lu	Xiaohe	Anastasia Gomzyakova	Foreign Family (daughter)
Ann Ho	Joyce Lam	Nikola Djuric	Foreign Family (son)
Ian Yim	Guang	Peter Au	Yuan's Corporate Manager
Jacqueline Chan	Young Cherry Yuan	Graeme Still	Yuan's Corporate Business Partner
Tang Yue Ping	Young Jing Yuan	Ng Ka Chuen	Yuan's Corporate Employee
Melanie Wong	Yingying	Leung Hon Yuen	Hospital Doctor
Wong Sze Yan	CIP	Ng Man Leung	Police
Mai Zi Jie	Lawyer	Bella Liu	Hotel Staff
Inggrid Yonata	Newscaster	Doris Wong	Boutique Sales
Wilson Cool	Hit-man	Cool Chan	Sales
Gigi Wong	Hoodie's Mum	Leung Tsz Ho	Young Hoodie
Leon Hill	US Inspector	Michael Ng	Clinic Director
Chow Tsz Lung	Psychological Consultant (male)	Leo Lai	Dr. Xiao
Yu Tat Chi; Lam Yiu Fai; Chan Kwok Kay; Wong Pui Chung	Yuan's Corporate Executives	Au-yeung Wing Ho; Wong Loy On; Wong Man Chun	Auxiliary Police
Rufus Tanksley; Mike Henry; Kingsley Uwode	Cops	Dee Dufoe; Peter Juffer	Forensic Officers
Carlos Ayala; Cristian Burea; Mario Ponce	Kidnappers	Peter Juffer; Matthew Talisay	Hoodie Body Double; Teen Hoodie Body Double

== Reception ==
The film has grossed CN¥33.3 million in China.
