= The Ghost Inside (film) =

- Directed by: Herman Yau
- Written by: Chau Ting
- Produced by: China Film Group
- Starring: Liu Ye; Barbie Hsu; Gong Beibi
- Distributed by: China Film Group
- Release date: May 6, 2005
- Running time: 100 minutes
- Country: China
- Language: Mandarin
- Budget: US$600,000

The Ghost Inside (Chinese: 疑神疑鬼; pinyin: Yi shen yi gui) is a 2005 Chinese horror film directed by Herman Yau, and starring Mainland actors, Liu Ye and Gong Beibi and Taiwanese actress Barbie Hsu.

The film was produced by the China Film Group and at the time of its filming was the most expensive horror film ever made in China at US$600,000.

== Plot ==
The Ghost Inside tells the story of a young mother, Lin Xiaoyue, who flees her abusive husband, taking their young daughter with her. She rents an apartment in a new apartment block, but soon regrets the move. A neighbor tells her that the apartment is haunted by the spirit of a young mother, who threw her daughter out of the window before jumping to her death herself. A series of strange occurrences convince Lin that there really is a ghost. The spirit eventually reveals herself to Lin. The ghost tells Lin that she too will one day commit murder–suicide in the same fashion.

Lin finds some solace in the company of a male neighbor. He helps fend off Lin's husband, when he finally manages to track Lin and his daughter down. But something about this neighbor and several other inhabitants of the building does not seem right.

Lin's husband shows up at the apartment late one night, with two goons. He is intent on taking his daughter back by force. Lin finds herself standing on her balcony, under encouragement from the ghost. She considers whether or not to throw her daughter and herself off, in order to stop her abusive husband from parting her from her daughter. The police eventually arrives and Lin is committed to a psychiatric institute.

== Cast ==
- Liu Ye
- Barbie Hsu
- Gong Beibi
- Zhan Yilin
- Wang Yong'er
- Hu Ge
