= The Fairies of Liaozhai =

Chinese television series

- Promotional poster
- Genre: Fantasy, adventure, romance, wuxia, supernatural, costume drama
- Written by: Wang Li; Tang Tang; Ou Gen; Wei Lian; Li Gao
- Story by: Pu Songling
- Starring: Nicky Wu; Fann Wong; Qu Ying; Daniel Chan; Lin Chia-yu; Pan Yueming; Sun Li; Cecilia Liu
- Country of origin: China
- Original language: Mandarin
- No. of episodes: 40

Production
- Producers: Lee Kwok-lap; Karen Tsoi
- Running time: 45 minutes per episode
- Production company: Chinese Entertainment Shanghai

The Fairies of Liaozhai
- Traditional Chinese: 聊齋奇女子
- Simplified Chinese: 聊斋奇女子
Transcriptions
Standard Mandarin
- Hanyu Pinyin: Liáo Zhāi Qí Nǚ Zǐ

The Fairies of Liaozhai is a Chinese television series adapted from Pu Songling's collection of supernatural stories titled Strange Stories from a Chinese Studio. The series is produced by Chinese Entertainment Shanghai and stars Nicky Wu, Fann Wong, Qu Ying, Daniel Chan, Lin Chia-yu, Pan Yueming, Sun Li and Cecilia Liu. Shooting began in December 2006 and wrapped up in March 2007. The 40-episode series is divided into four parts — Liancheng (連城), Xia Nü (俠女), Huanniang (宦娘), and Xin Shisiniang (辛十四娘).

== Cast ==
=== Liancheng ===
- Nicky Wu as Qiao Sheng
- Fann Wong as Liancheng
- Qu Ying as Binniang
- Ho Kwai-lam as Prefect Shi

=== Xia Nü ===
- Daniel Chan as Gu Xiangru
- Lin Chia-yu as Xu Mu'e
- Sun Xing as Prefect Lin
- Cao Xiwen as Lin Yuefu
- Song Yang as Fang Wukui

=== Huanniang ===
- Pan Yueming as Wen Ruchun
- Leslie Sun as Zhao Huanniang
- Liu Xiaoxi as Lianggong
- Andrew Lin as Young Master Qian
- Cui Peng as Qiaolangjun

=== Xin Shisiniang ===
- Cecilia Liu as Xin Shisiniang
- TAE as Feng Sheng
- Li Qian as Lu'er
- Han Xiao as Hu Mei
