= The 601st Phone Call =

2006 Chinese drama film

- Theatrical release poster
- Traditional Chinese: 第601個電話
- Simplified Chinese: 第601个电话
- Hanyu Pinyin: Dì liù líng yī ge diàn hùa
- Directed by: Zhang Guoli
- Written by: Zou Jingzhi
- Produced by: Feng Xiaogang
- Starring: Cecilia Cheung; Bibi Zhou; Hu Ge
- Production companies: Shanghai Film Group; Shanghai Uniglobe Film & Culture; Warner China Film HG Corporation; Beijing Dongwang Culture & Development
- Distributed by: Warner China Film HG Corporation
- Release date: 18 August 2006
- Running time: 90 minutes
- Country: China
- Language: Mandarin

The 601st Phone Call (simplified Chinese: 第601个电话; traditional Chinese: 第601個電話; pinyin: Dì liù líng yī ge diàn hùa) is a 2006 Chinese drama film directed by Zhang Guoli and written by Zou Jingzhi. It was released in mainland China on August 18, 2006.

== Plot ==
A young woman named Yishu believes she has no luck at all and she blames her name for it. One day she starts receiving phone calls from people thinking that she is the popular singer Tianyou. It turns out that someone has leaked 600 phone numbers of famous people to the internet and Yishu's phone number got mixed up in the bunch.

While Yishu finds it annoying at first, she soon receives a text message from Xiaowen, who is the singer in an amateur rock band. He wishes to write a song for Tianyou and wants Yishu - who he thinks is Tianyou's assistant - to deliver the song to Tianyou. Tianyou is a popular singer, but hasn't had a hit number lately. While she wants to sing for the sake of art, her cruel agent cares only for money and pressures her into recording an album she does not want to record because it doesn't contain any good songs. This decision gets her into a lot of trouble and she is attacked, furthering her personal depression.

While Yishu hears more of Xiaowen's song through their phone calls and text messages, Yishu is distracted from the problems she attributes to her bad luck. However, Xiaowen conceals the fact he is dying from a terminal illness, thus his desperation to finish his song and have it delivered to Tianyou. Meanwhile, Tianyou has lost interest in singing, since none of the songs she has been forced to record mean anything to her, and she contemplates suicide, a path that her agent secretly delights in because it will mean her unreleased record will sell-out after her death.

On the night that Tianyou is about to commit suicide, Xiaowen calls her cellphone from his hospital bed, having received the correct phone number from Yishu's efforts to find it, and sings her his song. Tianyou is inspired to continue and her career is revitalized; at her next concert, she dedicates the song Xiaowen has written to him and thanks him for saving her before singing it. Tianyou sends Yishu tickets to her concert, for one each for Yishu and Xiaowen, and Yishu invites Xiaowen, hoping to finally meet him. However, at the end of the concert, she finds Xiaowen's bandmates and learns from them that Xiaowen has already died.

== Cast ==
- Bibi Zhou as Yi Shu
- Cecilia Cheung as Tianyou
- Hu Ge as Xiaowen
- Niu Ben as Old Man Li
- Zhang Guoli as Chairman of the Board
- Zhang Meng as He Ling
- Wei Zongwan
- Liu Yiwei
- Guo Degang
