= Yuan Hong (actor) =

Chinese actor (born 1982)

- 袁弘
- Born: Yuan Ding (袁丁); 23 August 1982 (age 43); Wuhan, Hubei, China
- Other name: Justin Yuan
- Occupation: Actor
- Years active: 2003–present
- Agent: Shanghai Juhe Media Corporation
- Spouse: Zhang Xinyi (m. 2016)

Chinese name
- Chinese: 袁弘
Transcriptions
Standard Mandarin
- Hanyu Pinyin: Yuán Hóng

Yuan Hong (Chinese: 袁弘, born 23 August 1982), also known as Justin Yuan, is a Chinese actor.

== Biography ==
Yuan was born in Wuhan, Hubei. He graduated from Shanghai Theatre Academy in 2001.

Yuan gained attention with his role as Yang Kang in The Legend of the Condor Heroes (2008). His character, traditionally portrayed as an antagonist in previous film and television adaptations, was notably reinterpreted as a morally ambiguous and romantic antihero. He earned widespread recognition with his role as the thirteenth prince in the hit time-slip historical drama, Scarlet Heart (2011).

Yuan earned positive acclaim for his performance in the period drama, Ordinary World (2015), based on the novel of the same title by Lu Yi, for which he won the Best Supporting Actor award at the Golden Ox Awards. He also won the Best Actor award at the Huading Awards for his role in the historical romance drama Singing All Along (2016) co-starring Ruby Lin.

== Personal life ==
Yuan is a close friend of Hu Ge, his roommate at the Shanghai Theatre Academy.

Yuan married Princess Jieyou co-star Zhang Xinyi and held their wedding in Germany in May 2016.

== Filmography ==
=== Film ===
Year	English title	Chinese title	Role	Notes	Ref.
2013	A Chilling Cosplay	制服	Xiao Kai		
2016	So Lucky	杠上开花	Hei Pi		
2016	The New Year's Eve of Old Lee	过年好		Cameo	
2016	Flying Girl	飞天窑女	Zhao Gou		
2018	Miss Puff	泡芙小姐		Cameo	
2018	Love Apartment	愛情公寓	Wu Xie		
2019	Coward Hero	鼠胆英雄			
2019	Send Me to the Clouds	送我上青云	Mao Cui		
2021	Moses on the Plains	平原上的摩西			
2023	Trending Topic	热搜			

=== Television series ===
Year	English title	Chinese title	Role	Notes/Ref.
2004	Unparalleled	天下无双	Kangxi Emperor	
2004	Dandelion	蒲公英	Wang Boshen	
2005	Phantom Lover	夜半歌声	Xiao Ou	
2005	Strange Tale of Liaozhai	新聊斋志异	Sun Zichu	
2006	The Young Warriors	少年杨家将	Yelü Xie	
2008	The Prince's Education	上书房	Hongli	
2008	The Legend of the Condor Heroes	射雕英雄传	Yang Kang	
2009	Chinese Paladin 3	仙剑奇侠传三	Lei Yunting	
2010	Legendary Doctor	神医大道公	Si Jing	
2010	A Weaver on the Horizon	天涯织女	Lin Mufei	
2010	World People	天地民心	Qi Junzao (young)	
2011	Legend of the Double Dragons	迷雾双龙	Xing Wenyuan	
2011	Scarlet Heart	步步惊心	Yinxiang	
2012	Secret History of Princess Taiping	太平公主秘史	Axiena Simu	
2013	Mulan	巾帼大将军	Zhao Yu	
2013	Longmen Express	龙门镖局	Song Shuhuai	Cameo, ep 33
2013	True Love Brings Trouble	真爱惹麻烦	Wang Xiang	
2013	Ad Mania	广告风云	Ouyang Yue	
2014	Young Sherlock	少年神探狄仁杰	Li Zhi	
2015	Fall in Love with You Again	转身说爱你	Yu Chuhao	
2015	Ordinary World	平凡的世界	Sun Shaoping	
2015	Angel's City	天使之城	Mai Kewen	
2015	Hua Xu Yin: City of Desperate Love	華胥引之絕愛之城	Shen An	
2016	Princess Jieyou	解忧公主	Weng Guimi	
2016	Through the Mist	穿越谜团	Ma Dong	
2016	Singing All Along	秀丽江山之长歌行	Liu Xiu	
2016	Ares Ensanguined Youth	战神之血染的青春	Liu Xiaoran	
2016	Let's Fall in Love	咱们相爱吧	Shi Guang	
2018	Won't Let Go Of Your Hand	绝不松开你的手	Yang Qiming	
2018		秘密航线	Xie Yihang	
2018	Great Expectations	远大前程	Qi Lin	
2018	She Is Beautiful	她很漂亮	Situ Min	Cameo
2018	The Rise of Phoenixes	天盛长歌	Jin Siyu	
2020	Thorn	刺	Chen Xi	
2020	Under The Sun	生活像阳光一样灿烂	爱的正确标记法	Zhao Yangguang
2020	Ling Long	玲珑	Chi Xin	
2021	The Rebel Princess	上阳赋	Helan Zhen	
2026	My Dearest Stranger	暗恋者的救赎	Song Cheng	

=== Variety show ===
Year	English title	Chinese title	Role	Notes/Ref.
2015	Takes a Real Man	真正男子汉	Cast member	
2019	Mr. Housework	做家务的男人	Cast member	

== Discography ==
=== Soundtrack appearances ===
Year	English title	Chinese title	Album	Notes
2011	"Maybe It's Still Possible"	或许来得及	Ad Mania OST	
2012	"Back-to-back Silence"	背对背沉默	Fall in Love with You Again OST	

== Awards and nominations ==
Year	Award	Category	Nominated work	Result	Ref.
2015	7th China TV Drama Awards	Media Recommended Actor	—N/a	Won	
2015	7th Golden Ox Awards	Best Supporting Actor	Ordinary World	Won	
2017	22nd Huading Awards	Best Actor (Ancient Drama)	Singing All Along	Won	
2017	22nd Huading Awards	Best Actor (Contemporary Drama)	Let's Fall in Love	Nominated	
