= Seven Fairies =

Seven Fairies may refer to:

- Seven Fairies in Charles Perrault's version of the European tale Sleeping Beauty
- Pleiades (Greek mythology), seven daughters of the titan Atlas and the sea-nymph Pleione
- Seven Fairies (China), seven celestial sisters from Chinese mythology
- Helloi Taret, from Meitei mythology (Manipuri mythology) in Northeast India
- Seven Fairies of Saptha Kannimar Padal in South Indian culture
- Seven Fairies from the Javanese folktale Jaka Tarub and Seven Fairies
