= Dong Yong and the Seventh Fairy =

Chinese legend

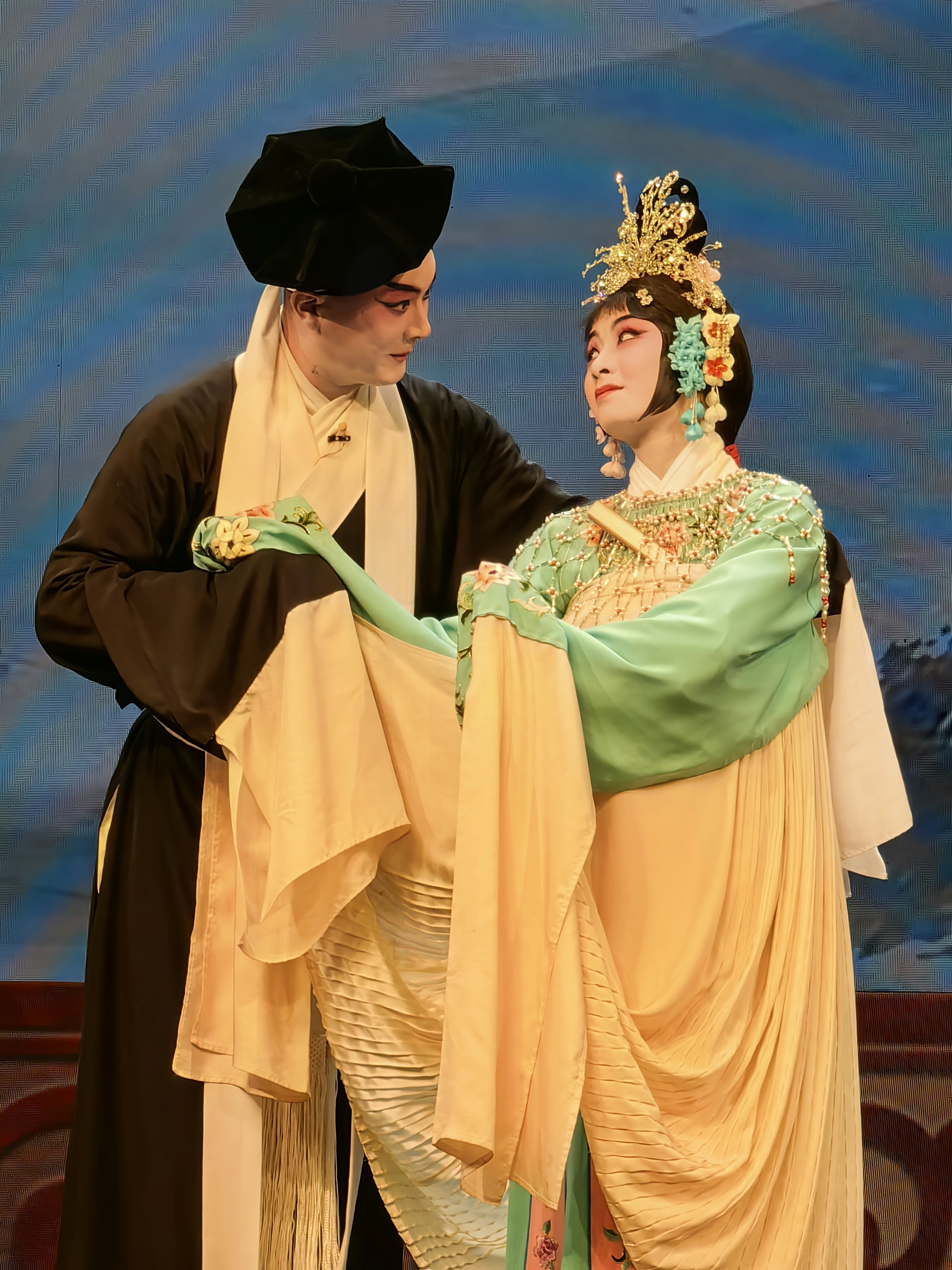
Dong Yong and the Seventh Fairy in Chu opera.

Dong Yong and the Seventh Fairy (Traditional Chinese: 董永與七仙女; Simplified Chinese: 董永与七仙女), aka Fairy Couple (天仙配), is a Chinese legend centered around a romance between an orphaned Han-dynasty man named Dong Yong and the Seventh Fairy, the youngest daughter of the Jade Emperor. Fairy Couple is also the most representative traditional repertoire of Huangmei opera.

== Story ==
The seven daughters of the Jade Emperor travel to the mortal world. The youngest of the seven fairy maidens was in search of her lost weaving equipment and her "coat of feathers", without which she was unable to fly. Another version of the story states that the seventh fairy's feather coat was actually stolen by a mortal named Dong Yong, advised by one of his cattle who happened to be an exiled fairy as well and disguised as a normal, aged bull. During the stay, the maiden falls in love with Dong Yong. He is a poor worker who had sold himself into servitude to pay for his father's funeral. With help of the other fairies, the seventh fairy managed to weave ten pieces of brocade for Dong Yong to pay off his debt, shortening his indenture to 100 days. Before the couple can begin their life together, the Jade Emperor orders his daughters to return home. However, he is kind enough to allow the couple to reunite once a year on the 七夕 (the 7th Evening)—later known as the traditional Chinese Qixi Festival—by crossing the Milky Way.

In memory of this story, ancient Chinese astrologers named two prominent stars that stand at a distance from each other 牛郎, "cowherd man", and 織女, "weaving girl". These are the stars Altair in the constellation Aquila and Vega in Lyra.

== Adaptations ==
=== Films ===
Year	Production	Additional information
1956	Mainland China	Fairy Couple (天仙配)
1963	Hong Kong	A Maid from Heaven (七仙女)
1963	Taiwan	Seven Fairies (七仙女)
1964	Taiwan	Seven Fairies (七仙女) and Seven Fairies, Chapter 2 (七仙女完結篇)

=== Television series ===
Year	Production	Additional information
1997	Mainland China	New Fairy Couple (新天仙配)
2005	Chinese Entertainment Shanghai (Mainland China)	The Little Fairy (天外飛仙)
2005	Beijing Advantages Competition International Culture and Arts & Jiangxi TV Co., Ltd. (Mainland China)	Huan Tian Xi Di Qi Xian Nu (歡天喜地七仙女)
2007	Mainland China	Fairy Couple (天仙配)
2010	Mainland China	Tian Di Yin Yuan Qi Xian Nu (Tian Xian Pei II) (天地姻缘七仙女(七仙女2))

=== Publications ===
The tale has also been subject matter of literary adaptations and retellings:

- Mao, Xian (2013). Cowherd and Weaver and Other Most Popular Love Legends in China. eBook: Kindle Direct Publishing.
- The Seventh Fairy: a reinterpretation of the myth made by Angelo Paratico in a book published in Hong Kong in 2017 by Lascar Publishing.

== See also ==
- The Weaver Girl and the Cowherd
- Icarus
- Tanabata
- The Tale of the Bamboo Cutter (輝夜姬)
- Jaka Tarub and the Seven Apsaras (Indonesian folktale)
- The Heavenly Maiden and the Woodcutter (Korean folktale)
- Pernikahan Nawangsih
- Ayashi no Ceres
