= Xiaoziye =

Deity in Chinese folk religion

Xiaoziye (simplified Chinese: 孝子爷; traditional Chinese: 孝子爺; pinyin: Xiàozǐ Yé; lit. 'Filial Son Lord'), also called Xiaozi Bo (孝子伯) or Mayi Shen (麻衣神, "Hemp-Clothed God"), is a god in Chinese folk religion. He is worshipped in Chinese temples in Malaysia and is sometimes called San Ye (三爺, "Third Lord"). Some people believe that he is Ding Lan, a man known for his filial piety in The Twenty-four Filial Exemplars. His appearance is similar to Bai Wuchang, but they are worshipped as different gods.

== Legends ==
One story about Xiaoziye comes from the legend of Ding Lan. In The Twenty-four Filial Exemplars, Ding Lan lost his parents when he was young. He made wooden images of them and treated them as if they were still alive. He gave them food and paid his respects to them every day. One day, his wife pricked one of the wooden images with a needle. The image began to bleed. When Ding Lan returned home, he saw tears on the image and learned what his wife had done. He then sent her away.

Another version tells how Ding Lan became Xiaoziye. In this story, Ding Lan lived with his widowed mother and worked as a farmer. He often beat and scolded her when she brought him food. One day, he saw a young crow feeding its mother and a lamb kneeling to drink its mother's milk. He felt ashamed and decided to become a good son. When his mother came to bring him food, he ran towards her to say he was sorry. She thought he was coming to beat her again and ran away in fear.

In one version, his mother jumped into a pond and drowned. Ding Lan tried to save her but could not find her body. He found a piece of wood in the water and took it home to worship in her memory. He wore mourning clothes and cried day and night. He finally died from crying, with blood coming from his eyes and mouth.

Another version says that his mother ran into a pear tree and died. Ding Lan used wood from the tree to make an image of her. He kept the image at home and prayed before it every day. He later died after crying for his mother for a long time. This story explains why Xiaoziye is shown wearing mourning clothes and crying tears of blood.

The story of Ding Lan has changed over time. Liu Hui-ping found that early versions describe Ding Lan making a wooden image of his father. The person who disrespected the image was not his wife. Ding Lan killed that person to take revenge. In later versions, the wooden images represent his parents, and his wife is the one who damages them. Liu explains how the story changed as Chinese ideas about revenge and family duties changed.

== Appearance and worship ==
Xiaoziye is usually shown wearing white clothes, a tall hat, and a hemp mourning robe. He carries a fan and a mourning staff. Some statues show him with a long tongue and tears of blood. His hat may bear the words "Yi Jian Da Ji" (一見大吉, "Good Luck at First Sight") or "Yi Jian Fa Cai" (一見發財, "Wealth at First Sight"). He looks similar to Bai Wuchang, but his mourning clothes and staff help tell them apart. Some people pray to him to teach their children to respect their parents.

In Malaysia, Xiaoziye is sometimes called San Ye (三爺, "Third Lord") and is worshipped alongside the Heibai Wuchang. Some people believe that he manages money in the underworld and can help them become wealthy. Lee Eng Kew describes statues with bags containing money and red envelopes. Worshippers sometimes borrow money from these bags for their businesses. They also offer cigarettes and alcohol to the god.

At Sanzang Fu (三藏府) in Seremban, Negeri Sembilan, Malaysia, Xiaoziye is the main god. The temple also worships the Black and White Impermanence gods, Jinqianbo (金錢伯), and other underworld gods. People visit the temple to pray for health, safety, and help with personal problems. Some believe that Xiaoziye can bring back lost souls. In this ritual, a family member holds a lantern, kneels, and calls the name of the person whose soul is believed to be lost. In 2017, the temple also collected rice and cooking oil instead of money. These offerings were given to poor families on the first Thursday of each month.

In Taiwan, a statue of Xiaoziye was enshrined at Donggang City God Temple (東港城隍廟) in Donggang, Pingtung.
