= Ma Lan =

Chinese performing artist (born 1962)

- Born: April 23, 1962 (age 63); Taihu County, Anhui, China
- Occupation: Huangmei opera performer
- Years active: 1980–2000
- Employer: Anhui Huangmei Opera Company
- Known for: Dan roles
- Spouse: Yu Qiuyu (m. 1992)

Chinese name
- Traditional Chinese: 马兰
- Simplified Chinese: 馬蘭
Transcriptions
Standard Mandarin
- Hanyu Pinyin: Mǎ Lán

Ma Lan (born 23 April 1962) is a Chinese performing artist of Huangmei opera who usually plays dan (female) roles. Before her abrupt (and unannounced) departure from the stage in 2000, Ma Lan was considered the most popular Huangmei opera performer in the country. She has won the Plum Blossom Award, the China TV Golden Eagle Award, and the Flying Apsaras Award, and performed on the CCTV New Year's Gala in 1984, 1987, 1988, 1992, 1997, and 2005. She is often compared to the 1950s/1960s superstar Yan Fengying, whom she movingly portrayed in a hit 1988 TV series.

Ma Lan is married to writer Yu Qiuyu. In a 2006 blog post, Yu Qiuyu blamed toxic workplace politics and corruption in Anhui Huangmei Opera Company for his wife's involuntary retirement at age 38. This post generated fervent discussions.

== Biography ==
Ma Lan was born in Taihu County, Anhui, in 1962, and graduated from Anhui Acting Performance School in 1975, where she majored in the performance of Huangmei opera. Succeeding in her debut in 1980, she later created some vivid portrayals of famous characters, such as the artist Zhang Yuliang, Jia Baoyu in Dream of the Red Chamber, Zhu Yingtai in the Butterfly Lovers, Princess Yunhua in the Daughter of the Dragon King, Yan Fengying in Yan Fengying, and Cui Yingying in Romance of the Western Chamber. In 1987, she won the Plum Blossom Prize, and in 1988, she won the Golden Eagle Award for Best Actress and the Flying Apsaras Award for Outstanding Actress for her portrayal of Yan Fengying. Most of her performances are still considered as among the best examples of the art of Huangmei opera.

== Repertoire ==
English title	Original title	Role	Notes
The Female Imperial Son-in-Law	女駙馬	Feng Suzhen	
Daughter of the Dragon King	龍女	Yunhua	made into a 1984 film
The Female Painter from the Brothel	風塵女畫家	Zhang Yuliang	
Much Ado About Nothing	無事生非	Bicui	Based on Shakespeare's Much Ado about Nothing
Romance of the Western Chamber	西廂記	Cui Yingying	
An Exhumation Dream	劈棺驚夢	Lady Tian	made into a 1988 TV series
Dream of the Red Chamber	紅樓夢	Jia Baoyu	Ma Lan's only cross-gender role
Swing Frame	鞦韆架		
Butterfly Lovers	梁祝	Zhu Yingtai	

== Filmography ==
Year	English title	Original title	Role	Notes
1986	Journey to the West	西遊記	Yin Wenjiao	
1988	Yan Fengying	严凤英	Yan Fengying	

== Awards ==
=== Huangmei opera ===
Ma Lan received the prestigious Plum Blossom Award in 1987.

=== TV series ===
Year	#	Award	Category	Work	Result
1988	8th	Flying Apsaras Awards	Outstanding Actress	Yan Fengying	Won
1988	6th	China TV Golden Eagle Award	Best Actress	Yan Fengying	Won
