= Yu Qiuyu =

Chinese writer and scholar (born 1946)

- 余秋雨
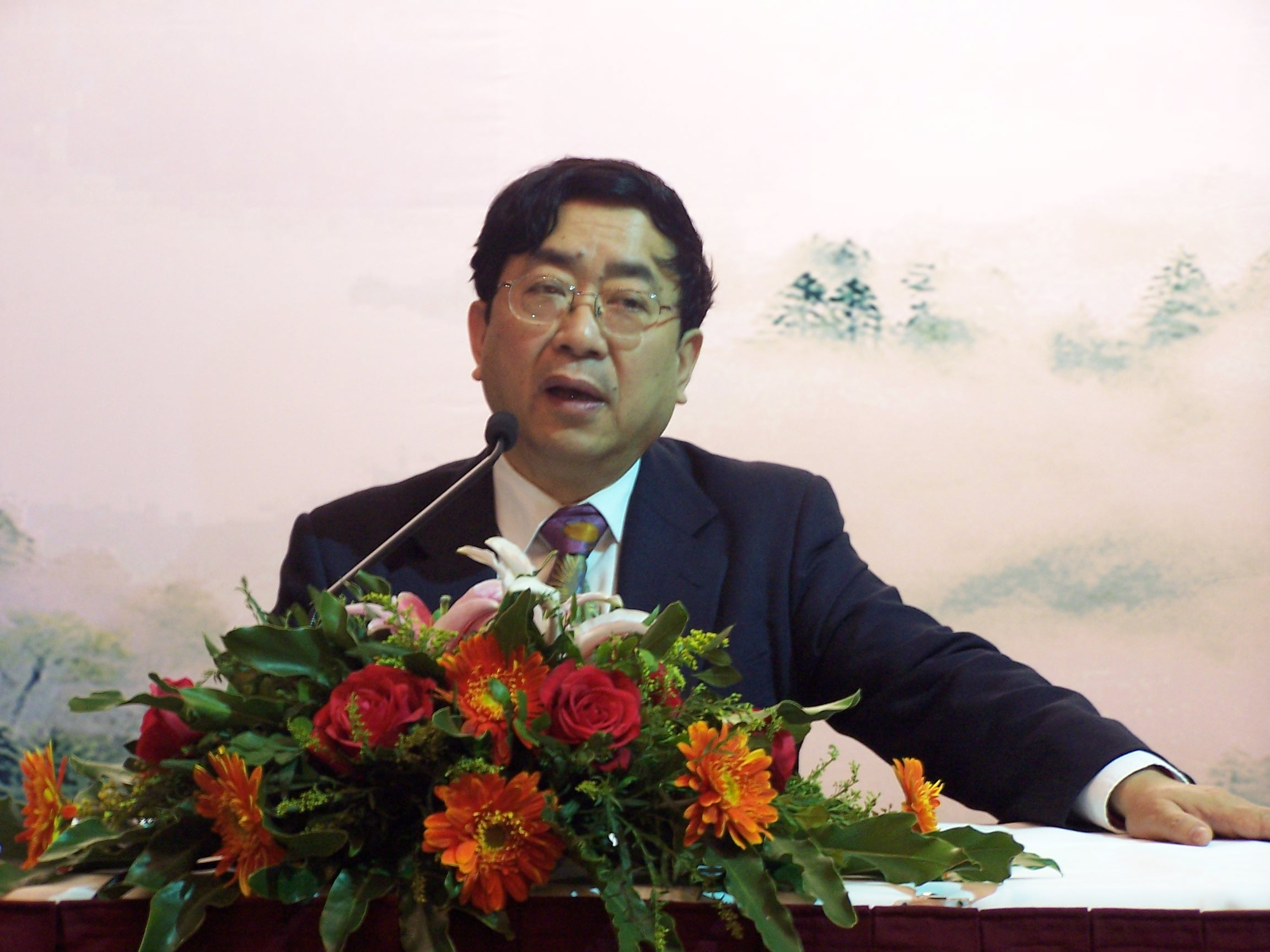
- Yu in 2003
- Born: August 23, 1946 (age 80); Cixi County, Zhejiang, China
- Occupations: Writer, scholar
- Spouse: Ma Lan
- Writing career
- Language: Chinese
- Period: 1980s–present
- Genres: Prose, novel
- Notable work: Cultural Sojourn

Yu Qiuyu (Chinese: 余秋雨; pinyin: Yú Qiūyǔ; born 23 August 1946) is a Chinese writer and scholar.

== Life ==
Yu was born in Qiaotou Town (桥头镇), Cixi County (formerly Yuyao County), Zhejiang on August 23, 1946. He finished his elementary school in his hometown.

In 1963, he was admitted to the Department of Drama and Literature of the Shanghai Theatre Academy. After entering the school, he participated in agricultural labor.

In 1966, when the "Cultural Revolution" disaster occurred, the family broke. His father, Mr. Yu Xuewen, was detained for ten years for being accused of “false remarks” and the family’s economic source was cut off; the only uncle who was able to help him, Mr. Yu Zhishi, was persecuted to death by the rebels. In the hunger and cold, in 1968, he was sent to the 27th Army Army for labor service, which was extremely difficult.

In February 1985, Wang Yuanhua, Jiang Kongyang, and Wu Hao, senior academics of Shanghai universities, jointly recommended them. They were promoted to full professors without being an associate professor. They were the youngest liberal arts professors in the country.

In March 1986, the National Ministry of Culture ranked first in the three public opinion polls held at the Shanghai Theatre Academy. He was appointed as the vice president and dean of the Shanghai Theatre Academy, and was the youngest university president in the country. One year after presiding over the work, he was recognized by the Department of Education of the Ministry of Culture as one of the “four deans who have the most modern management skills”. At the same time, he served as the Shanghai Consultant Planning Consultant, the President of the Shanghai Writing Society, the Shanghai Chinese Professional Professor Evaluation Team Leader and the Art Professional Professor Review Team Leader. He was awarded the honorary title of “National Outstanding Contribution Expert” and “Shanghai Top Ten Higher Education Elites”.

From 1989 to 1991, he refused to be promoted to several provincial and ministerial positions, and began to submit a report to the Ministry of Culture to resign as dean. The resignation report was submitted 23 times in total, and finally was allowed to resign in all administrative positions in July 1991, including various honorary positions and name-related positions. After resigning, he was alone from the Northwest Plateau and systematically inspected all important sites of Chinese culture. The theme of the investigation that was determined at that time was "crossing a hundred years of blood and tears, looking for a thousand years of glory." In the study of the "cultural essays", 《文化苦旅》(Cultural Sojourn), "Mountain Notes" and other fast-moving global Chinese reading circles, it is called "the most modern Chinese literature books with the largest printing volume". He has thus become one of the most influential Chinese writers in the world.

In June 1998, the grand cross-century cultural dialogue was convened in Singapore to shake the Chinese world. The main characters of the dialogue are four Chinese scholars, in addition to Professor Yu Qiuyu, Professor Du Weiming from Harvard University, Professor Gao Xijun from the University of Wisconsin, and artist Chen Ruixian. Yu Qiuyu’s speech titled “The Fourth Bridge”.

Since 1999, he has presided over the historical inspection of the major civilizations of human beings by Hong Kong Phoenix Satellite TV. It has become the only humanistic professor in the world to cross the tens of thousands of kilometers of dangerous areas. It is also the first to report the terrorism control area to the civilized world before the 9/11 incident. The scholar of the situation. This was selected by the Japanese "Asahi Shimbun" as "the top ten international figures across the century."

Since 2000, due to the huge impact of the global inspection, some domestic media have launched a large-scale embarrassment in pursuit of the market effect of “reverse anti-stimulus”. First, a student from Peking University mistakenly criticized a Shanghai literary rumor for reversing criticism, that is, the textbook writing group set up by Premier Zhou Enlai for the rescue education was described as the "Cultural Revolution Writing Group", and the Shanghai literati himself was mistakenly involved. The pen name is "Shi Yi Ge". Thus, a critical tide of more than a decade without actual evidence is formed. According to Professor Yang Changxun’s statistics, there are more than 1,800 articles in the article. Yu Qiuyu did not make any rebuttals and counterattacks on this. He said: "The horses are thousands of miles away, and they don't wash the dust." After 12 years, they disappeared and wrote the article "Shi Yi Ge" (Chinese:石一歌).

In March 2004, participated in the design, discussion and review of the United Nations Development Programme Human Development Report. At the end of 2004, it was selected by UNESCO, Peking University, and China Talent Magazine as “China's Top Ten Cultural Elites” and “Chinese Cultural Communication Coordinates”.

On July 20, 2005, at the United Nations "World Civilization Conference", he delivered a keynote speech "The Conclusion of Matteo Ricci", which discusses the non-aggressive nature of Chinese civilization since ancient times. For the first time, it culturally questioned the "China threat theory."

From 2005 to 2008, he was hired by the Hong Kong Baptist University as the "Foundation Professor of Sound Personality Education" and worked in Hong Kong for no less than half a year.

On May 12, 2008, the Wenchuan Earthquake occurred in China. The first time it rushed to the disaster area to participate in the rescue, and continued to give a speech on the scene to the people and rescuers in the disaster area. After seeing the disabled textbooks left by the students in the ruins, they decided to donate three student libraries. However, since each book must be personally selected and purchased by itself, the donation money cannot be found in the accounts of the Chinese Red Cross, so it was speculated on the Internet as a “swindle donation”. Later, the Education Bureau of the disaster area repeatedly stated that the donation was built, and Wang Meng, Feng Yucai, Zhang Xianliang, Jia Pingwa, Liu Shikun, Bai Xianyong, and Yu Guangzhong all wrote inscriptions for the three student libraries, and the storm was calmed down.

On March 27, 2010, he was awarded the title of “Doctor of Honorary Literature” by the Macau University of Science and Technology. At the same time, he was awarded the honorary doctorate by experts such as Yuan Longping, Zhong Nanshan, Ouyang Ziyuan and Sun Jiadong.

On April 30, 2010, he was appointed by the Macau University of Science and Technology and became the Dean of the School of Humanities and Arts of the Macau University of Science and Technology. It is announced that during the term of office, the annual salary of HK$500,000 per year will be donated in full as a scholarship for postgraduate students majoring in design art and communication.

On May 21, 2010, the first "World Report" on the theme of culture since the establishment of the United Nations, the main part of the launch ceremony was a dialogue between the Director-General of UNESCO, Ms. Bokova, and Mr. Yu Qiuyu. Yu Qiuyu’s speech in the dialogue was entitled “Rejecting the “Clash of Civilizations””. On October 12, 2012, the China Academy of Art established the “Autumn Rain Academy” in Beijing as the Dean. The college is a high-level teaching institution for cultivating doctoral students. It now trains two professional doctoral students: one, major in Chinese cultural history; and two, major in Chinese art history. On the afternoon of October 18, 2013, I went to the United Nations Headquarters Building in New York, USA, to give a speech on "Why Chinese Culture Longevity". For the first time, I questioned the "China Collapse Theory" from the cultural perspective. On the same day, the UN website listed this speech as the first important news.

In March 2015, he was invited to conduct a “Circle Island Tour” in major cities in Taiwan, from Taipei City, New Taipei City, Taichung City to Kaohsiung City. The blind nephew masters led the monk team to the Kaohsiung station to greet them and gave the highest reception. This is the fourth large-scale round-the-island speech by Professor Yu Qiuyu since his first visit to Taiwan in 1991. The theme of this speech is "Chinese Culture and the Way of the Gentleman."

In November 2015, he was elected as the honorary president of the World Yu Clan Association.

On September 9, 2016, he resigned as dean of the School of Humanities and Art. He was honored as Honorary Dean and Distinguished Professor of Macao University of Science and Technology.

In August 2017, Gate Hole was published by Hunan Literature and Art Publishing House.

== Personal life ==
His wife Ma Lan is a Huangmei opera performing artist. Ma Lan’s main stage performances were mostly written by Yu Qiuyu. The couple currently live mainly in Shanghai.

== Works ==
- Notes on Living in the Mountains (Chinese: 山居笔记)
- 《文化苦旅》(Cultural Sojourn), March 1992, 上海东方出版社
- 《霜冷长河》
- 《千年一叹》 (2000, Sigh of a Thousand Years)
- 《行者无疆》
- 《借我一生》
- 《中国文脉》The Chinese Literary Canon (tr. by Philip Hand 2015)
- 《山河之书》(1995?) a novel: The Book of Mountains and Rivers (tr. by Jeremy Tiang 2015)
- 《何谓文化》
- 《君子之道》
- 《吾家小史》
- 《冰河》
- 《泥步修行》
- 《空岛》
- Gate Hole (Chinese:门孔)
- 《北大授课》
- 《极端之美》
- 《世界戏剧学》
- 《中国戏剧史》
- 《艺术创造学》
- 《观众心理学》
