= Wang Guan (Three Kingdoms) =

Chinese Cao Wei state official (died 260)

- 王觀

Excellency of Works (司空)
- In office 6 July 260 – November or December 260
- Monarch: Cao Huan
- Preceded by: Wang Chang
- Succeeded by: Wang Xiang

Left Supervisor of the Masters of Writing (尚書左僕射)
- In office 254 – 6 July 260
- Monarch: Cao Mao

Household Counsellor (光祿大夫)
- In office 254 – 6 July 260
- Monarch: Cao Mao

Chief Commandant of Escorting Cavalry (駙馬都尉)
- In office 249 – 254
- Monarch: Cao Fang

Master of Writing (尚書)
- In office 249 – 254
- Monarch: Cao Fang

Minister Coachman (太僕)
- In office ? – 249
- Monarch: Cao Fang

Minister Steward (少府)
- In office ? – 239
- Monarch: Cao Rui

Intendant of Henan (河南尹)
- In office ?–?
- Monarch: Cao Rui

Personal details
- Born: Unknown; Yuncheng County, Shandong
- Died: November or December 260
- Children: Wang Kui
- Occupation: Politician
- Courtesy name: Weitai (偉臺)
- Posthumous name: Marquis Su (肅侯)
- Peerage: Marquis of Yang District (陽鄉侯)

Wang Guan (died November or December 260), courtesy name Weitai, was a Chinese politician of the state of Cao Wei during the Three Kingdoms period of China. An orphan who made a name for himself as an honest local official, he would become a partisan of the Sima family as they overtook the Cao family and reached the highest ranks, though he retired after regicide.

== Life ==
Wang was from Linqiu (廩丘) in Dong Commandery, which was located between present-day Henan and Shandong provinces. He was orphaned at a young age and, by gentry standards, grew up poor, but he became a man of energy and ambition.

In 210 Chancellor Cao Cao summoned him to serve as a Writing Assistant in the Imperial Chancellor's office. Later, he was reassigned to serve as the County Prefect (縣令) of Gaotang (高唐), Yangquan (陽泉), Zan (酂) and Ren (任) counties. In each post he earned praise for his government.

== Service to Wei emperors ==
On March 220, Cao Cao died and was succeeded by his eldest living son Cao Pi and on 11 December Emperor Xian of the Eastern Han dynasty abdicated, Cao Pi becoming the founding Emperor of the Wei dynasty. Wang Guan was recalled to the capital Ye to serve as a Gentleman of Writing (尚書郎), serving in the Imperial Secretariat (尚書省), a powerful body at the heart of government, then as a Supervisor in the Ministry of Justice (廷尉監). Afterwards, he was appointed as the Administrator (太守) of Nanyang (南陽) and Zhuo (涿) commanderies. Zhuo had a particular problem with raids from the nearby Xianbei people, so Wang Guan ordered large families to band together as a garrison and construct a fortress while he went to the court to send officials to help. Not everybody was keen but Wang Guan refused to set a deadline and without the pressure, people cooperated and built the walls quickly. It is said that, once this was done, the raiding ceased.

Cao Pi died on 29 June 226 and was succeeded as Emperor by his son Cao Rui on the same day. Cao Rui ordered classifiers to grade the situational severity in each prefecture. The areas labelled severe would see labour and tax demands decreased but in exchange, the head would have to send a family member as hostage. The official wished to designate Zhuo in a lesser category as Wang Guan had only one, young, son but Wang Guan refused and would send his son as hostage.

During one of Cao Rui's visits to Xuchang Wang Guan was summoned to the capital to the Censorate with authority over prisons. Despite Cao Rui's impulsive nature, Wang Guan refused to flatter the Emperor and it would be Sima Yi, as Grand Commandant (太尉), who would encourage Wang Guan's career. With the patronage of one of the most senior officials at court, Wang Guan would serve once more in the Imperial Secretariat. He was promoted to Intendant of Henan in charge of the capital commandery and then became one of the Nine Ministers as Minister Steward, in charge of the finances of the imperial family.

== Service during regencies ==
On 22 January 239, Cao Rui died leaving the adopted child Cao Fang to ascend the throne. A regency ensued with Sima Yi and imperial kinsman Cao Shuang in charge but the pair fell apart and Cao Shuang would push Sima Yi into retirement. Wang Guan however is said to have opposed Cao Shuang's attempts to abuse his power. When Cao Shuang sought timber for personal use, Wang Guan raided the timber office, and he repeatedly enforced laws to prevent Cao Shuang getting access to treasuries within the government offices. As Cao Shuang felt uncomfortable with Wang Guan for this reason, he demoted Wang Guan to Minister Coachman (太僕). However, the records are known to be hostile towards Cao Shuang and there may have been other reasons Cao Shuang moved a Sima Yi partisan to another ministerial role.

Sima Yi launched a coup against his rival on 5 February 249. Wang Guan participated in the coup by becoming a temporary general, the Central Commander of the Army (中領軍), the position of Shuang's brother Cao Xi (曹羲) and taking over Cao Xi's troops. After Cao Shuang was executed on 9 February, Sima Yi arranged for Wang Guan to receive the title of a Secondary Marquis (關內侯) and was appointed as a Master of Writing (尚書) and Chief Commandant of Escorting Cavalry (駙馬都尉).

In 254, Cao Fang had grown up and sought to overthrow his controller, Sima Yi's son Sima Shi but the plots failed and Cao Fang was deposed and jailed for life on 17 October. Sima Shi and his ministers, following the precedent of the deposed Former Han Liu He, accused Cao Fang of being a sexual deviant morally unworthy of the throne with Wang Guan one of the names to sign these accusations. When the young Cao Mao came to the throne, Wang Guan was promoted to Marquis of Zhongxiang Village (中鄉亭侯) and made a Household Counsellor (光祿大夫) and Left Supervisor of the Masters of Writing (尚書左僕射).

On 2 June 260, Cao Mao sought to free himself from his controller Sima Zhao, Sima Shi's brother, but was killed in the streets by Sima loyalists. On 27 June, the last Wei Emperor, Cao Huan ascended the throne. On July 7, Wang Guan was enfeoffed as the Marquis of Yang District (陽鄉侯), adding another 1000 households to his fiefdom, for a total of 2500 households. Wang was also appointed as Excellency of Works(司空), reaching one of the three highest ministerial posts. However, unlike during Cao Fang's abdication, Wang Guan's name is not listed on any of the memorials around Cao Mao's death and Wang Guan tried to refuse the promotion. Sima Zhao rejected the refusal and dispatched an envoy. Wang Guan took the post but resigned, hanging up his seals of office and returned home.

== Death and legacy ==
Wang Guan died at home in the winter of 260. He left orders to be buried in a plain coffin without a grave mound or treasures. His posthumous title was "Solemn Marquis", and he was succeeded to his noble rank by his son Wang Kui (王悝). After Shu-Han fell and Sima Zhao became King of Jin, in 264 he revived the Five Feudal Ranks of Zhou with Wang Kui, in honour of his father, becoming a viscount.

Praised for his governance in the posts he held outside the capital, his willingness to send his sole and young son as hostage to help Zhuo was used as an example of his public spirit. As someone who looked to provide an honest example, he inspired others via his example to work hard and be honest. In 256, Lu Yu (盧毓; son of Lu Zhi) unsuccessfully tried to reject promotion to Excellency by suggesting alternative appointments, including Wang Guan.

== See also ==
- Lists of people of the Three Kingdoms
