= Yan Fengying =

Chinese opera performer

- Born: Yan Hongliu; April 13, 1930; Tongcheng, Anhui, Republic of China
- Died: April 8, 1968 (aged 37); Hefei, Anhui, People's Republic of China
- Occupation: Huangmei opera performer
- Years active: 1944–1966
- Known for: Young dan roles
- Style: Yan school (founder)
- Spouses: Gan Lüzhi (甘律之) (m. 1954–1956) Wang Guanya (王冠亚) (m. 1956–1968)
- Children: 2

Chinese name
- Traditional Chinese: 嚴鳳英
- Simplified Chinese: 严凤英
Transcriptions
Standard Mandarin
- Hanyu Pinyin: Yán Fèngyīng

Yan Fengying (13 April 1930 – 8 April 1968), born Yan Hongliu, also known as Yan Daifeng, was a Chinese Huangmei opera artist who played dan (female) roles. Though she lived a short life, she left such a mark and is today remembered as the "queen of Huangmei opera".

Like most famous Chinese opera artists, Yan Fengying suffered greatly in the Cultural Revolution (1966–1976). Charged with 13 (trumped up) criminal counts of "counterrevolutionary activities" and tortured beyond enduring, she killed herself in 1968. Her death reveals the shocking cruelty and lunacy of that period. After her overdosing on sleeping pills was discovered by her husband Wang Guanya, instead of rushing her to the hospital, the authorities held a struggle session at her bedside. One hospital refused to admit her, and the one that did, reluctantly, refused to treat her without permission from her danwei (work unit). She died without receiving treatment, but was promptly dissected to find out whether she carried an enemy (Kuomintang) radio transmitter in her body. Writer Geling Yan, who grew up in Hefei, described what she saw on that day in a 2012 interview:

I always remember Yan Fengying's suicide. At that time she was unconscious, tubes all over her body. IV lines, urine catheters. The male doctor just had her exposed like that for everyone to see. She had no clothes on, nude, flesh waiting to be cut up, in full view of a group who could hurt her. She was a specimen stapled on a hospital bed. An electrician intentionally dropped [his] cigarette butt [on her]... At that time I was 9. I was terrified.

Wang Guanya published a biography of her in 1981, and wrote the screenplay of the TV series Yan Fengying. The 1988 biopic, which starred "the next Yan Fengying" Ma Lan in the title role, became a national hit (and made Ma Lan well known among those who do not listen to opera). One man was so moved by Yan's tragic fate that he sold all his clothes to travel from Fujian to Hefei to "beat up" Wang Guanya because he thought Wang did not protect his wife enough. More people, however, sympathized with Wang, who was himself tortured, and many girls offered to marry him. Until his death in 2013, Wang Guanya never remarried. He spent the rest of his life adapting Yan Fengying's repertoire into TV series, radio series, and Huangmei operas for the younger generation.

The Female Imperial Son-in-Law (女駙馬)
A sample from a 1959 film featuring Yan's singing

== Repertoire (incomplete) ==
English title	Original title	Role	Notes
Tian Xian Pei	天仙配	Seventh Fairy	made into a 1956 film
The Female Imperial Son-in-Law	女駙馬	Feng Suzhen	made into a 1959 film
Liu Sanjie	劉三姐	Liu Sanjie	
The Cowherd and the Weaver Girl	牛郎織女	Weaver Girl	made into a 1963 film
The Couple Enjoys the Lantern Show	夫妻觀燈	Wang Xiaoliu's wife	a video from 1956 survives
The Green Jade Hairpin	碧玉簪	Li Xiuying	Audio recording survives
Hitting the Princess	打金枝	Princess Shengping	
Cutting Hogweed	打豬草	Tao Jinhua	
An Appointment on Blue Bridge	藍橋會	Lan Yulian	
Delivering the Fragrant Tea	送香茶	Chen Yueying	
A Kitchen Knife Story	菜刀記	Liu Fengying	
