= The Twenty-four Filial Exemplars =

Yuan dynasty text on Confucian filial piety

- Chinese: 二十四孝
- Literal meaning: Twenty-four filial piety
Transcriptions
Standard Mandarin
- Hanyu Pinyin: Èrshísì Xiào
- Wade–Giles: êrh^{4}-shih^{2}-ssŭ^{4} Hsiao^{4}

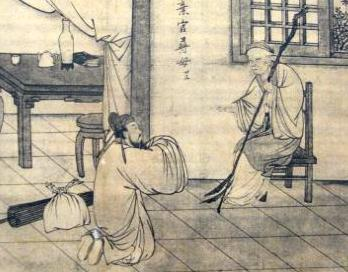
Illustration from an 1846 reprinting

The Twenty-four Filial Exemplars, also translated as The Twenty-four Paragons of Filial Piety (Chinese: 二十四孝), is a classic text of Confucian filial piety written by Guo Jujing (郭居敬) during the Yuan dynasty (1260–1368). The text was extremely influential in the medieval Far East and was used to teach Confucian moral values.

== Authorship ==
The text is generally attributed to Guo Jujing (郭居敬) but other sources suggested two other possible authors or editors: Guo Jujing's younger brother Guo Shouzheng (郭守正) and Guo Juye (郭居業).

== History ==
Title page of The Twenty-four Filial Exemplars from an early Ming dynasty printed edition

Pages from a Chinese-English translated version of the book

Some of the stories in The Twenty-four Filial Exemplars were taken from other texts such as the Xiaozi Zhuan (孝子傳), Yiwen Leiju, Imperial Readings of the Taiping Era and In Search of the Supernatural.

There were earlier precedents of The Twenty-four Filial Exemplars. A Buddhist bianwen titled Ershisi Xiao Yazuowen (二十四孝押座文), which was among the manuscripts discovered in Dunhuang's Mogao Caves, is the oldest extant text related to The Twenty-four Filial Exemplars. During the Southern Song dynasty, the artist Zhao Zigu (趙子固) drew a painting, Ershisi Xiao Shuhua Hebi (二十四孝書畫合璧), about The Twenty-four Filial Exemplars. During the Yuan dynasty, the scholar Xie Yingfang (謝應芳) mentioned in Gui Chao Ji (龜巢集) that a certain Wang Dashan (王達善) once praised The Twenty-four Filial Exemplars and the Classic of Filial Piety. During the Qing dynasty, Wu Zhengxiu (吳正修) mentioned in Ershisi Xiao Gu Ci (二十四孝鼓詞) that the Twenty-four Filial Exemplars were very well known.

After the release of The Twenty-four Filial Exemplars, revised editions of the text and other similar works were published. Some of these include: Riji Gushi Daquan Ershisi Xiao (日記故事大全二十四孝; Complete Diary Stories of the Twenty-four Filial Exemplars), Nü Ershisi Xiao (女二十四孝; Female Twenty-four Filial Exemplars), and Nan Nü Ershisi Xiao (男女二十四孝; Male and Female Twenty-four Filial Exemplars).

The philologist Yang Bojun mentioned the development of The Twenty-four Filial Exemplars in Jingshu Qiantan (經書淺談). After the book was compiled by Guo Shouzheng during the Yuan dynasty, a new illustrated edition with drawings by Wang Kexiao (王克孝) was released, and this made the book even more popular. Towards the end of the Qing dynasty, Zhang Zhidong and others edited and expanded the book and released it as Bai Xiao Tu Shuo (百孝圖說; Illustrated Hundred Stories of Filial Piety).

=== Filial piety ===
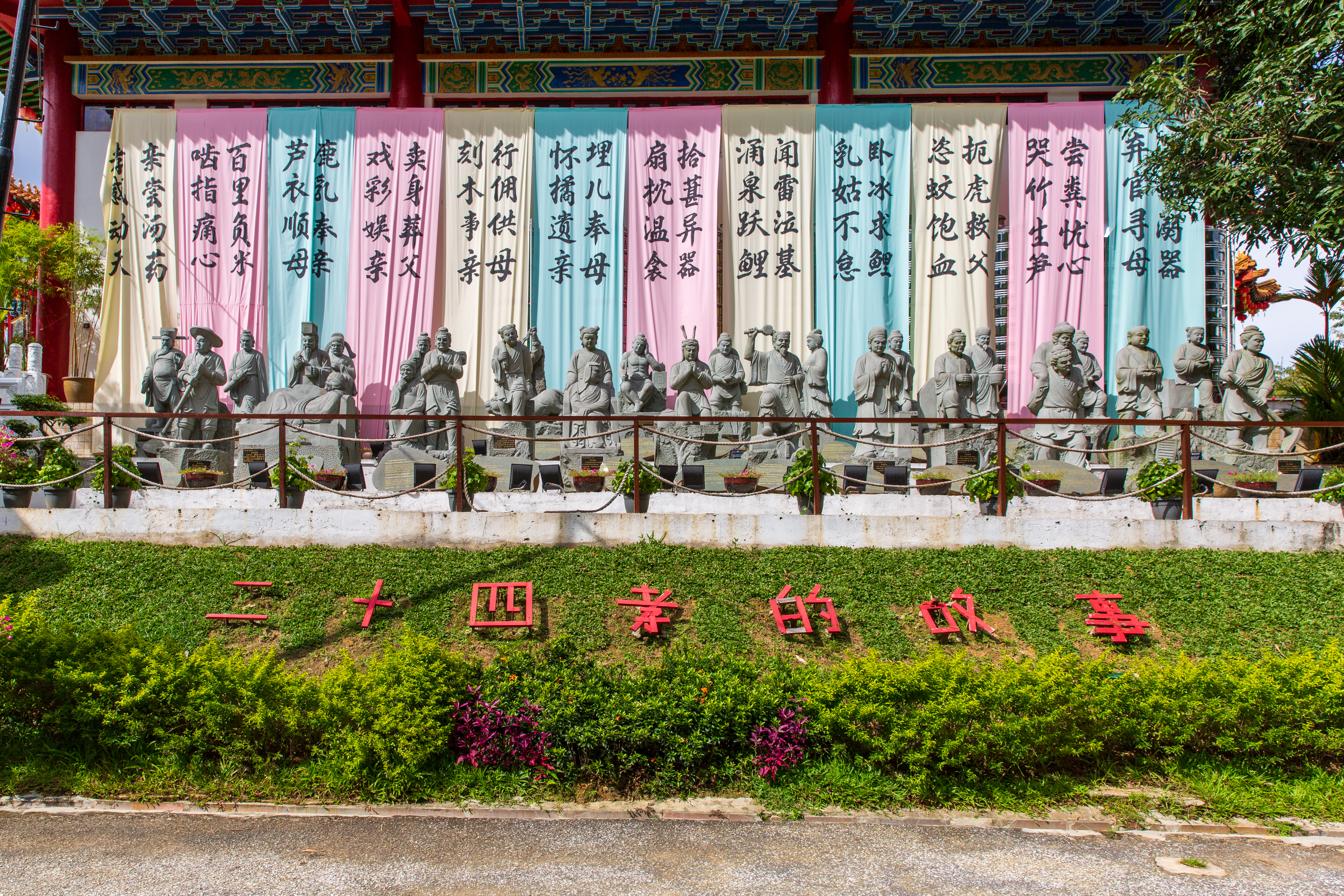
Statues of the Twenty-four Filial Exemplars, Thean Hou Temple, Malaysia

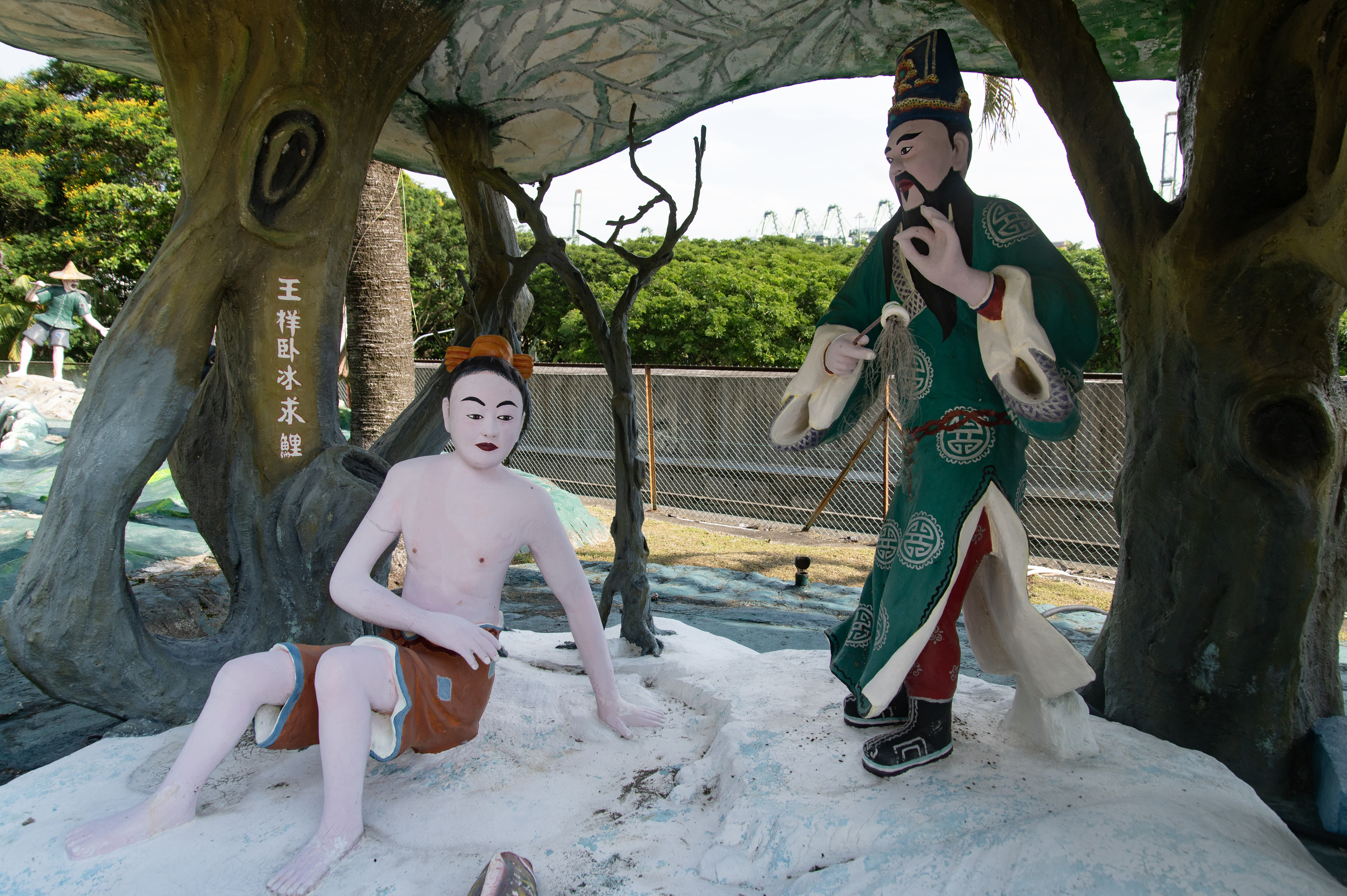
Depiction of Wang Xiang laying on ice in search of a carp at Haw Par Villa, Singapore.

The concept of filial piety has played a strong role in Chinese culture since ancient times. There was also a tradition of filial mourning, in which a person had to temporarily put aside whatever he/she was doing when his/her parent(s) died and mourn for three years. There were sayings such as "When a ruler wants a subject to die, the subject must die; when a father wants a son to die, the son must die", and "A loyal subject should be sought from a family with filial sons."

However, some stories in The Twenty-four Filial Exemplars are regarded as negative examples in contemporary times. These stories include the extreme example of Guo Ju deciding to kill his son so that he could free up his son's share of the family's food consumption to feed his mother. The negative examples also include stories in which the protagonist harms himself in the process of fulfilling filial piety, such as Wu Meng allowing mosquitoes to suck his blood in the hope that they would not bother his parents, and Wang Xiang lying naked on ice to thaw the ice so that he could catch fish for his mother.

Some stories have been heavily criticised and even deemed contrary to Confucian principles. One example is the story of Cai Shun being rewarded by the Chimei rebels for his filial piety. The story paints the rebels in a positive light when they actually violated the Confucian virtue of loyalty to one's country. Another example is the story of Laolaizi behaving childishly to amuse his parents. The modern writer Lu Xun said that Laolaizi's story is "an insult to the ancients, and a bad influence on future generations".

== The Exemplars ==
#	Title	Protagonist	Historical setting	Brief summary
1	His Filial Piety Moves Heaven and Earth (孝感动天; 孝感動天; Xiào Gǎn Dòng Tiān)	Shun 舜	Three Sovereigns and Five Emperors era	This story was set in the childhood of Shun, a mythical Chinese ruler. Shun's mother died when he was young so his father remarried and had another son with Shun's stepmother. Shun remained filial to his father, respected his stepmother and loved his half brother even though they tried to kill him. His filial piety moved the gods so they protected him from harm and made the animals help him in his daily farming chores.
2	He Tasted His Mother's Medicine (亲尝汤药; 親嘗湯藥; Qīn Cháng Tāng Yào)	Liu Heng 劉恆	Western Han dynasty	Liu Heng (Emperor Wen of Han) was known for his filial piety to his mother, Empress Dowager Bo. When she was ill, he personally took care of her and paid careful attention to her needs. When medicine was served to her, he insisted on tasting it first to ensure that it was safe for her to consume.
3	He Felt Pain in His Heart When His Mother Bit Her Finger (啮指痛心; 齧指痛心; Niè Zhǐ Tòng Xīn)	Zeng Shen 曾參	Spring and Autumn period	Zeng Shen was born in a poor family and was known for his filial piety. Once, when he was out gathering firewood, some visitors showed up at his house. His mother bit her finger and hoped that he would sense something and come home quickly. As she expected, Zeng felt a sharp pain in his heart and thought that something had happened to his mother, so he immediately rushed home. His mother told him the reason when he returned. The guests praised him for his filial piety.
4	He Obeyed His Mother and Wore Thin Clothes (单衣顺母; 單衣順母; Dān Yī Shùn Mǔ)	Min Sun 閔損	Spring and Autumn period	Min Sun's mother died early so his father remarried and had two other sons. Min was ill-treated by his stepmother but he never bore any grudges against her. During winter, his stepmother prepared a coat made of reed catkins for him, but prepared coats made of cotton for his half brothers. One day, Min followed his father out and was instructed to drive the carriage. However, as the coat was too thin, Min was unable to withstand the cold so he shivered and was unable to focus on the task at hand. He accidentally caused the carriage to get stuck in a ditch. Min's father was furious and started beating him until his clothes tore and the reed catkins came out. It was then when Min's father realised that his son was being mistreated. He was so angry that he wanted to expel Min's stepmother from the family. However, Min pleaded with his father to spare his stepmother, saying, "If she stays, only I suffer. But if you send her away, my brothers and I will suffer." Min's stepmother was so touched that she regretted her actions and never mistreated Min again.
5	He Carried Rice for His Parents (为亲负米; 爲親負米; Wèi Qīn Fù Mǐ)	Zhong You 仲由	Spring and Autumn period	Zhong You was born in a poor family. When he was young, he often travelled a distance away from home and carried back a sack of rice to feed his parents. He ate only wild vegetables. Many years later, when he became an important and wealthy official in the Chu state, his parents had already died. He often recalled his past and lamented, "I can never eat wild vegetables and carry rice back for my parents anymore."
6	He Fed His Parents with Doe's Milk (鹿乳奉亲; 鹿乳奉親; Lù Rǔ Fèng Qīn)	Tan Zi 郯子	Spring and Autumn period	Tan Zi's elderly parents were losing their sense of sight and believed that doe's milk could cure them. Upon hearing that, Tan Zi covered himself with deer's skin and got close to a doe to obtain its milk. He repeated the process every day. Once, a hunter mistook him for a real deer and almost killed him, but Tan Zi revealed himself and explained the situation to the hunter.
7	He Dressed Up to Amuse His Parents (戏彩娱亲; 戲彩娛親; Xì Cǎi Yú Qīn)	Laolaizi 老萊子	Spring and Autumn period	Laolaizi was a hermit who lived in the Chu state. He was known for being very filial to his parents. Even in middle age, he still dressed up in bright coloured clothes, played with toys, and behaved childishly to amuse his parents and keep them happy.
8	He Sold Himself for His Father's Funeral (卖身葬父; 賣身葬父; Mài Shēn Zàng Fù)	Dong Yong 董永	Eastern Han dynasty	Dong Yong lost his mother at a young age so he lived with his father, who also died not long later. As he could not afford to give his father a proper funeral, Dong sold himself as a slave to a rich man, who paid for his father's funeral. One day, he met a homeless woman and married her. She helped him weave 300 rolls of silk within a month. Dong sold the silk and used the money to buy his freedom. On the way back, the woman revealed that she was actually the Heavenly Emperor's daughter and was sent to Earth to help Dong gain back his freedom. She then returned to Heaven since her task was complete. The city name Xiaogan in Hubei, meaning Filial Piety Moves [the Heaven] (Chinese: 孝行感天), is from the story of Dong Yong.
9	He Buried His Son for His Mother (为母埋儿; 爲母埋兒; Wèi Mǔ Mái Ér)	Guo Ju 郭巨	Eastern Han dynasty	Guo Ju lived with his mother, wife and son. He was known for being very filial to his mother. However, his family was poor and Guo became worried when he realised that his family's food supply was unable to feed four people. After discussing with his wife, they made a painful decision to bury their son alive, so that they would have one less mouth to feed. He also felt that he and his wife could have another child again, but he could not have his mother back if he lost her. While Guo was digging, he discovered a pile of gold and a note which said that the gold was a gift to him from Heaven. With the gold, Guo was able to provide for his whole family.
10	The Fountain Bubbled and the Carps Leapt Out (涌泉跃鲤; 湧泉躍鯉; Yǒng Quán Yuè Lǐ)	Jiang Shi 姜詩	Eastern Han dynasty	Jiang Shi and his wife were both very filial to his mother. They lived a distance away from the river. However, because Jiang's mother enjoyed drinking water from the river and eating fish caught in the river, the couple did not mind travelling long distances daily to collect water and catch fish to please her. When Jiang's mother said she preferred more company, the couple invited their neighbours to join them during meals. One day, due to bad weather, Jiang's wife did not return in time from her trip to the river. Jiang thought that she was being disrespectful to his mother by keeping her waiting, so he drove his wife away in anger. Jiang's wife stayed in a neighbour's house, spent the night weaving clothes for her mother-in-law, and asked the neighbours to help her deliver them the next day. When Jiang's mother learnt the truth, she ordered her son to bring her daughter-in-law home. On the day Jiang's wife came back, a fountain suddenly burst out in front of the house and the water from it tasted exactly like the water from the river. Besides, two carps also leapt out of the fountain every day. From then on, Jiang and his wife no longer needed to travel to the river to collect water and catch fish.
11	He Picked Mulberries for His Mother (拾椹供亲; 拾椹供親; Shí Shèn Gòng Qīn)	Cai Shun 蔡順	Xin dynasty / Eastern Han dynasty	Cai Shun lost his father when he was young so he lived with his mother, to whom he was very filial. During those chaotic times, food prices were high so Cai and his mother ate mulberries to sustain themselves. One day, while Cai was out gathering mulberries, he encountered Chimei rebels, who asked him why he separated black and red mulberries and placed them in different baskets. Cai replied that the black ones (which tasted sweet) were for his mother while the red ones (which tasted sour) were for himself. The rebels were impressed by his filial piety and gave him some rice and a cow's hoof.
12	He Carved Wooden Figures of His Parents to Serve Them (刻木事亲; 刻木事親; Kè Mù Shì Qīn)	Ding Lan 丁蘭	Eastern Han dynasty	Ding Lan was orphaned at a young age, but he missed his parents so much that he carved wooden figurines in their likeness and treated them as if they were alive. One day, when Ding was out, his wife used a needle to prick one of the figurines out of curiosity. To her shock, the figurine started bleeding. When Ding returned home, he saw the figurine bleeding and tears flowing from its eyes, so he asked his wife what happened. After learning the truth, he was so angry that he divorced his wife and drove her away.
13	He Hid Oranges for His Mother (怀橘遗亲; 懷桔遺親; Huái Jú Yí Qīn)	Lu Ji 陸績	Eastern Han dynasty	When Lu Ji was six years old, his father Lu Kang once brought him to visit Yuan Shu. Yuan treated them to mandarin oranges. Lu took two and hid them in his sleeve. While Lu and his father were preparing to leave, the oranges suddenly rolled out of his sleeve. Yuan laughed, "You came as a guest. Must you hide the host's oranges when you're leaving?" Lu replied, "My mother likes mandarin oranges so I wanted to bring them home for her to try." Yuan was very impressed with Lu's filial piety.
14	He Laboured to Support His Mother (行佣供母; 行傭供母; Xíng Yōng Gòng Mǔ)	Jiang Ge 江革	Han dynasty	Jiang Ge carried his mother on his back and took care of her along the way as they travelled from Linzi to Xiapi. When they encountered robbers on the journey, Jiang tearfully pleaded with them to spare him and his mother. The robbers were so touched by Jiang's filial piety that they spared him and his mother and pointed out a safe travel route for him. In Xiapi, Jiang worked hard to ensure that his mother could live comfortably.
15	He Fanned the Pillow and Warmed the Blanket (扇枕温衾; 扇枕溫衾; Shàn Zhěn Wēn Qīn)	Huang Xiang 黃香	Eastern Han dynasty	Huang Xiang lost his mother when he was nine years old so he lived with his father and was very filial to his father. During summer, Huang fanned his father's pillow to ensure that his father could sleep comfortably at night. In winter, he wrapped himself with his father's blanket to warm it.
16	He Cried at His Mother's Grave When He Hears Thunder (闻雷泣墓; 聞雷泣墓; Wén Léi Qì Mù)	Wang Pou 王裒	Three Kingdoms period	Wang Pou's mother was afraid of the sound of thunder when she was still living. After she died, whenever Wang heard thunder, he rushed to her grave to hug her tombstone and comfort her.
17	He Fed Mosquitoes with His Blood (恣蚊饱血; 恣蚊飽血; Zī Wén Báo Xuě)	Wu Meng 吳猛	Jin dynasty	Wu Meng was already known for his filial piety when he was still a child. His family was poor and could not afford mosquito nets. During summer nights, Wu stripped and sat near his parents' beds to allow mosquitoes to suck his blood in the hope that they would not bother his parents.
18	He Lay on Ice in Search of Carp (卧冰求鲤; 臥冰求鯉; Wò Bīng Qiú Lǐ)	Wang Xiang 王祥	Eastern Han dynasty / Three Kingdoms period	Wang Xiang's mother died when he was young. His stepmother disliked him and often spoke ill of him in front of his father, which resulted in him losing his father's love. However, Wang remained filial to them and he personally took care of them while they were sick. Once, during winter, Wang's stepmother suddenly had a craving for carp. Wang travelled to the frozen river, undressed, and lay on the icy surface. The ice thawed and Wang was able to catch two carps for his stepmother.
19	She Fought a Tiger to Save Her Father (扼虎救亲; 扼虎救親; È Hǔ Jìu Qīn)	Yang Xiang 楊香	Jin dynasty	When Yang Xiang was 14, she once followed her father to harvest the crops. A tiger suddenly appeared and attacked her father. In desperation, Yang jumped onto the tiger and attempted to strangle it with her bare hands. The tiger released her father and ran away.
20	He Cried and the Bamboo Sprouted (哭竹生笋; 哭竹生筍; Kū Zhú Shēng Sǔn)	Meng Zong 孟宗	Eastern Han dynasty / Three Kingdoms period	Meng Zong's father died when he was young so he lived with his mother. Once, when his mother was ill, the physician suggested that she drink a soup made from fresh bamboo shoots. However, it was in winter then and there were no bamboo shoots. In desperation, Meng went to the bamboo forest alone and cried. Just then, he heard a loud noise and saw bamboo shoots sprouting out of the ground. He was so happy that he collected them, went home and made soup for his mother. She recovered from her illness after drinking the soup.
21	He Tasted His Father's Faeces and Worried about His Father (尝粪忧心; 嘗糞憂心; Cháng Fèn Yōu Xīn)	Yu Qianlou 庾黔婁	Southern Qi dynasty	Yu Qianlou was appointed as the magistrate of Chanling County. One day, after he held office for less than ten days, he suddenly had a feeling that something had happened at home, so he resigned and went home. When he reached home, he learnt that his father was seriously ill for two days. The physician told him that the way to check his father's condition was to taste his faeces. If they tasted bitter, it meant that his father was fine. Yu then tasted his father's faeces and found that they tasted sweet, so he became very worried. At night, he prayed to the gods and expressed his willingness to die in his father's place. However, his father still died a few days later. Yu buried his father and mourned for three years.
22	She Breastfed Her Mother-in-Law (乳姑不怠; Rǔ Gū Bù Dài)	Madam Tang 唐夫人	Tang dynasty	Madam Tang was the grandmother of a jiedushi called Cui Shannan (崔山南), so this story probably took place in Cui's childhood. Cui's great-grandmother, Madam Zhangsun, was very old and had already lost all her teeth. Madam Tang took care of her mother-in-law and breastfed her for years. When Madam Zhangsun was on her deathbed, she summoned all her family members and told them, "I can never repay my daughter-in-law's kindness. I just hope that all of you will treat her as well as she treated me." After Cui grew up, he followed his great-grandmother's words and treated his grandmother kindly.
23	He Gave Up His Official Career to Search for His Mother (弃官寻母; 棄官尋母; Qì Guān Xún Mǔ)	Zhu Shouchang 朱壽昌	Song dynasty	When Zhu Shouchang was seven years old, his mother (his father's concubine) was driven away from home by his stepmother (his father's main wife). When he grew up, he became a government official and held office for years. He missed his mother and hoped to reunite with her, even though they had never seen each other for over 50 years. When he received clues of her whereabouts, he gave up his career, travelled far in search of her, and vowed never to give up until he found her. He was eventually reunited with his mother, who was already in her 70s then.
24	He Washed His Mother's Bedpan (涤亲溺器; 滌親溺器; Dí Qīn Nì Qì)	Huang Tingjian 黃庭堅	Northern Song dynasty	Huang Tingjian was very filial to his mother and took care of her personally even after he had become a government official. He even washed his mother's bedpan.
