= Dong Yong =

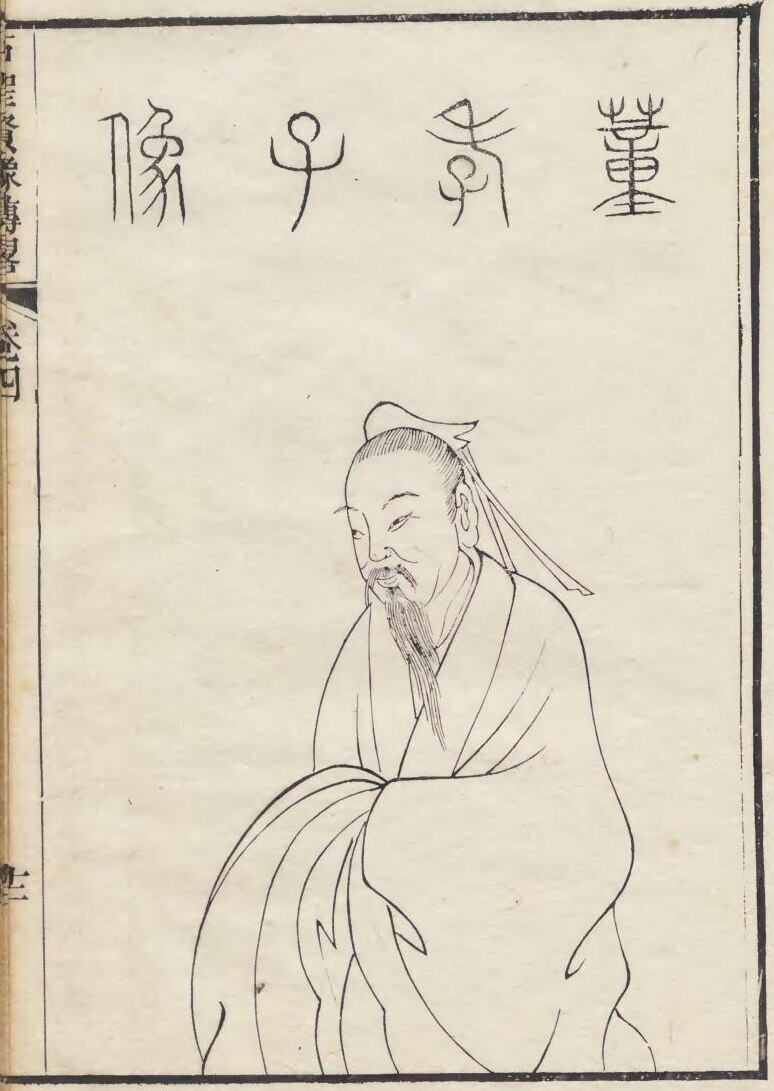
Dong Yong depicted by Kong Lianqing (孔蓮卿) in the 19th century.

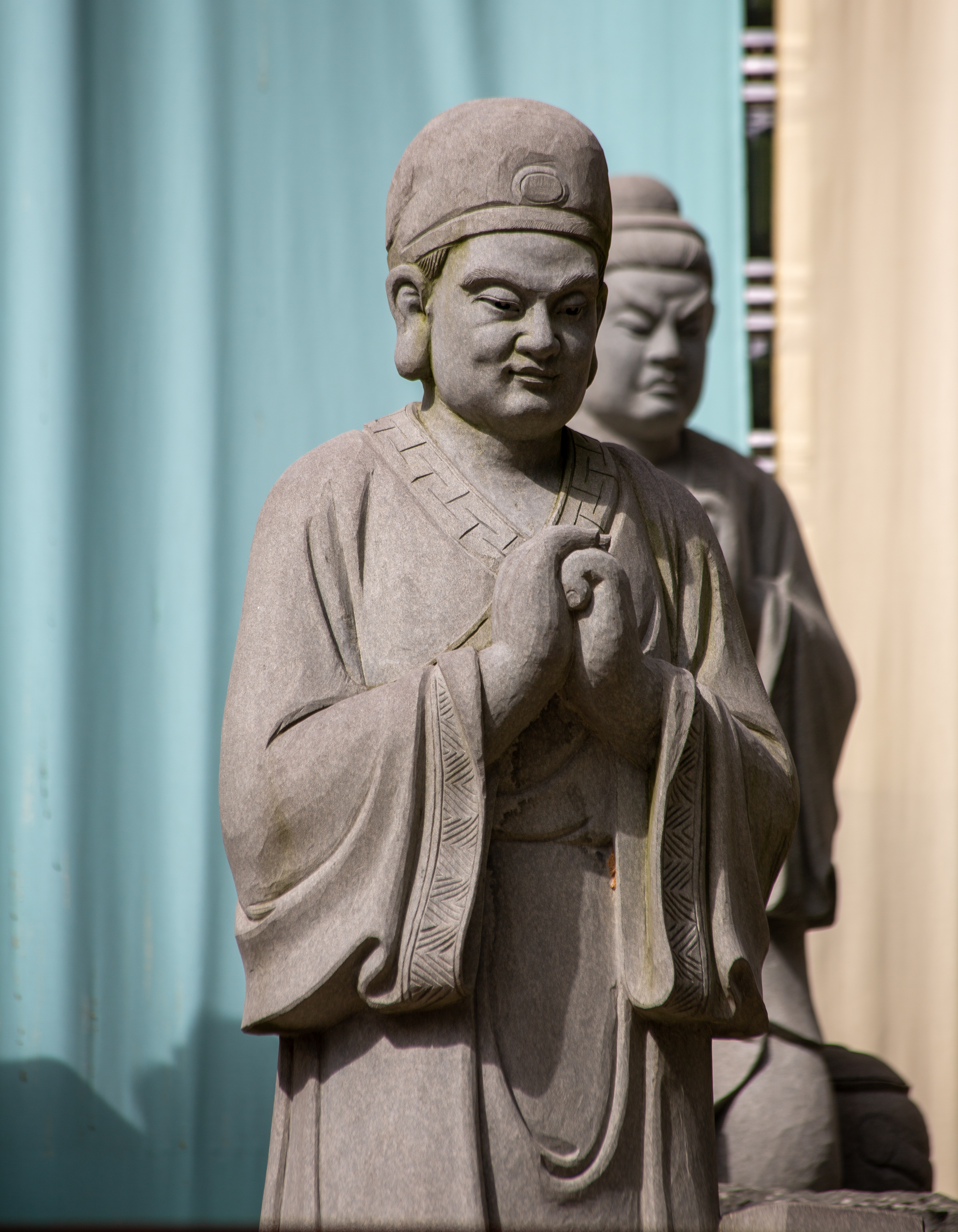
Dong Yong's statue in Thean Hou Temple, Kuala Lumpur, Malaysia.

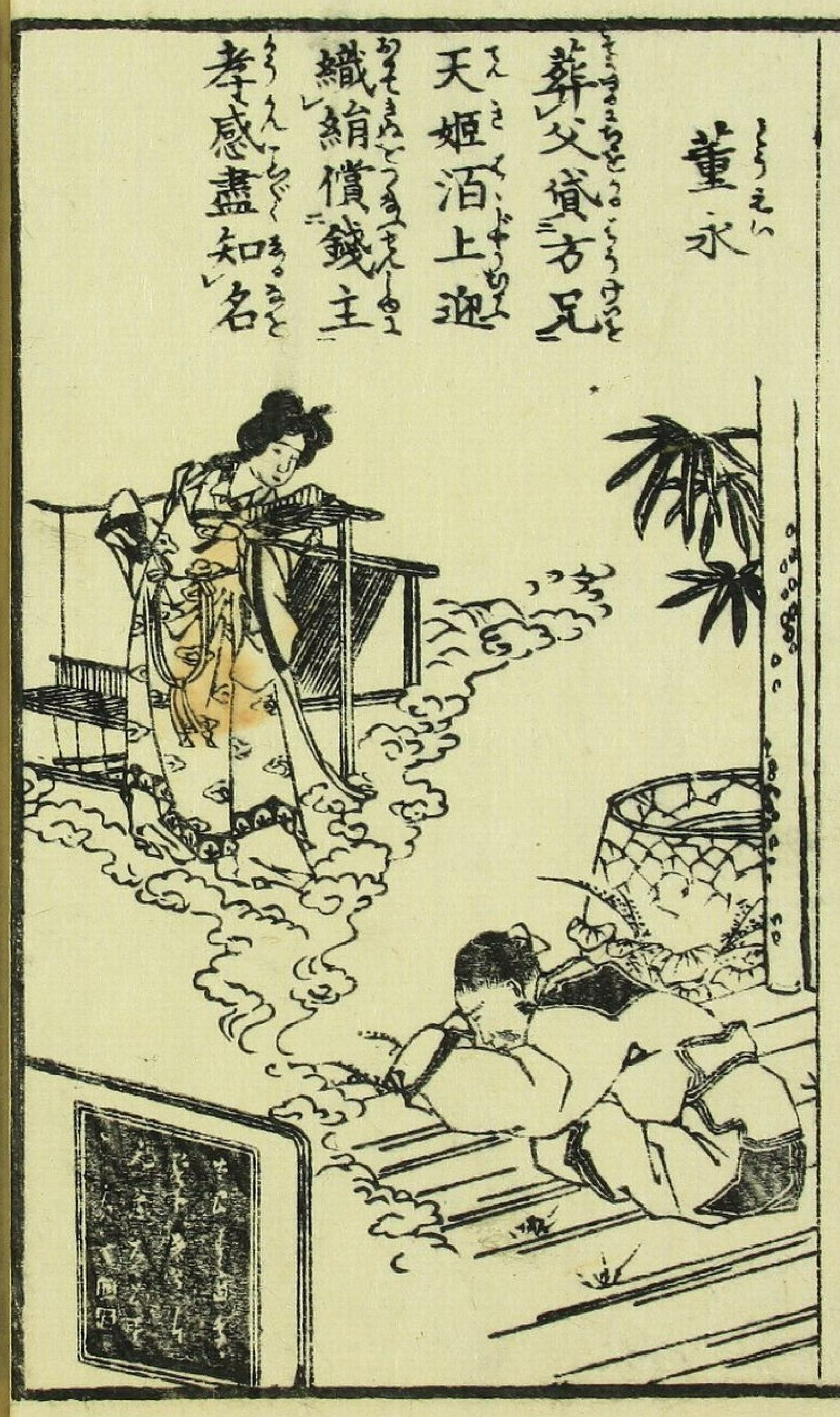
Dong Yong and the Heavenly Maiden depicted by Japanese artist Urakawa Kōsa (浦川公佐) in the mid-19th century.

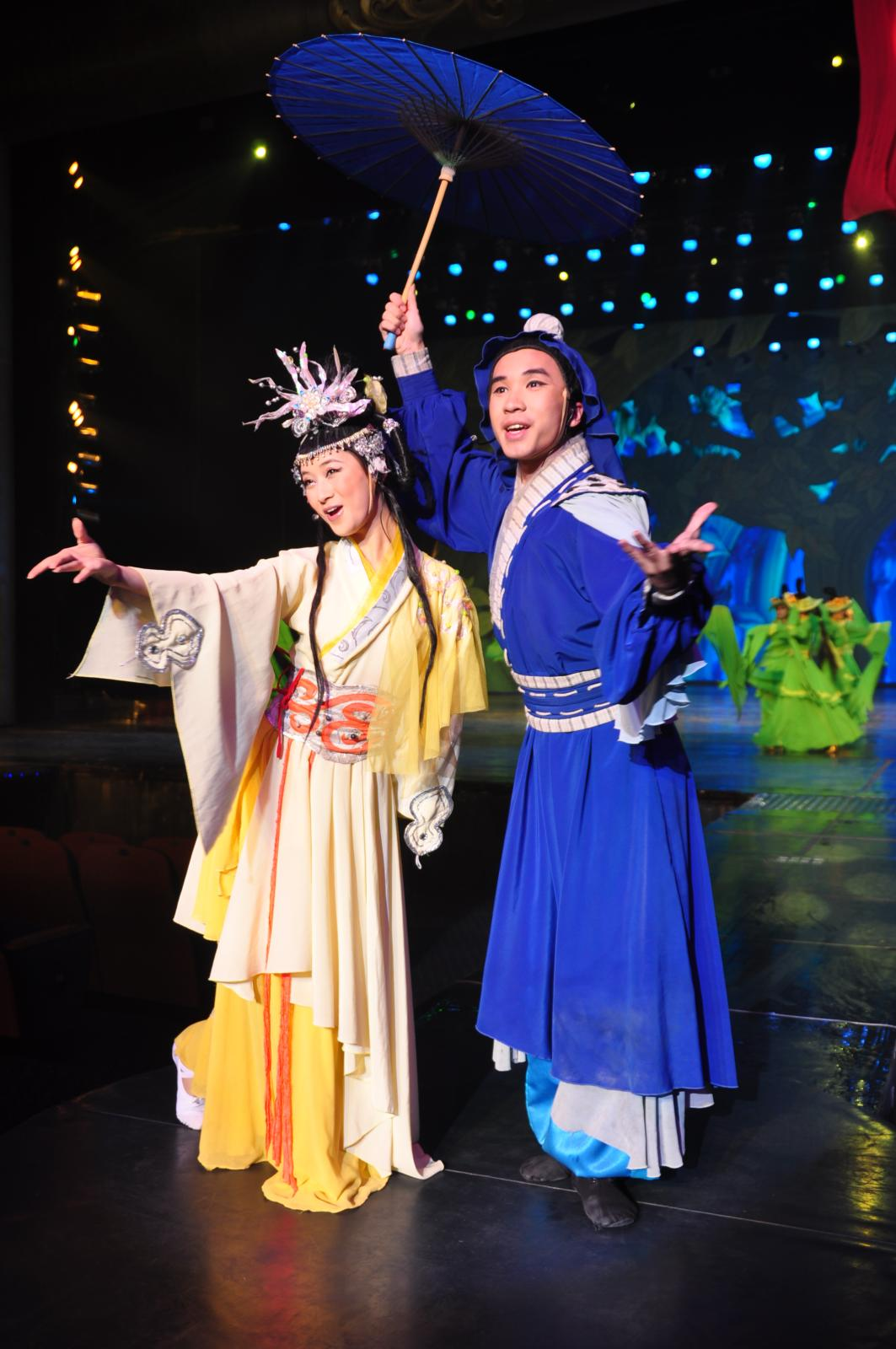
A duet from the Huangmei opera Married to a Heavenly Fairy being performed in Huangshan City, Anhui Province.

In Chinese folklore, Dong Yong (Chinese: 董永; pinyin: Dǒng Yǒng; Wade–Giles: Tung^{3} Yung^{3}) is one of the Twenty-four Filial Exemplars who sold himself into servitude to bury his dead father. Touched by his filial piety, a celestial maiden (usually identified as the Seventh Fairy in modern times) came to Earth, married him and changed his fortunes.

Dong Yong was possibly a real person from the Han dynasty (202 BC – 220 AD), and a pictorial relief bearing his name has been found in the second-century site of Wu Family Shrines in Shandong Province. His legend probably began with a poem by Cao Zhi (192–232) and a "canonical" tale in the fourth-century text In Search of the Supernatural.

Due to local belief that Dong hailed from their place, the city of Xiaogan in Hubei Province derived its name from his story. However, the legend's earliest versions are all set in Shandong.

== Historicity ==
Historical records from the Han dynasty do mention a certain Dong Yong who was enfeoffed as the Marquis of Gaochang (高昌侯) in 26 AD, after his father was deprived of the inherited title in 1 AD. His great-grandfather Dong Zhong (董忠) had been the first Marquis of Gaochang in his family. The earliest evidence of the "filial Dong Yong" comes from the Wu Family Shrines in Jiaxiang County, Shandong, dated to 151 AD, which contains a pictorial relief showing Dong Yong caring for his father in the field.

The Western Han dynasty saw the rise of filial rites in China, following the widespread circulation of the Classic of Filial Piety. Under the xiaolian system initiated in 134 BC, candidates for offices were nominated based on their filial piety, which were often displayed through lavish funerals and mourning rituals. Dong Yong's legend originated from this period.

== Development of the legend ==
=== Dong Yong and the Weaver Girl ===
Although the seventh-century Buddhist text Fayuan Zhulin claims that Liu Xiang (77–6 BC) wrote a tale about Dong Yong in a work titled The Biographies of Filial Sons (孝子傳), Wilt L. Idema considered it "very unlikely that Liu ever compiled such a work". Instead, the first written version of the Dong Yong legend was most likely Cao Zhi's third-century poem Numinous Mushroom (靈芝篇), which contains eight lines on Dong. In Cao's version, Dong goes into debt and works as a hired laborer to provide his father with "delicacies". Heaven is moved, and a celestial maiden arrives to work the loom for him.

Dong Yong's first prose "biography" appeared in the fourth-century In Search of the Supernatural compiled by Gan Bao. In this version, Dong Yong lost his mother when he was little. Whenever he works the fields, he wheels his aging father in a cart to the field so that he is not neglected. When his father dies, Dong sells himself into servitude to pay for the funeral. On the way to his master, he meets a girl who tells him "I want to be your wife." They get married and his wife weaves a hundred bolts of cloth for his master in ten days. Their work finished, the girl tells Dong Yong: "I am the Weaver Girl (zhinü) from Heaven. Because of your extreme filial piety, Heaven ordered me to help you repay your debt." She immediately disappears. In the centuries to follow, this version would be included in various collections of biographies of filial sons.

In a ninth- or tenth-century bianwen ballad discovered among the Dunhuang manuscripts, Dong Yong has a son named Dong Zhong (董仲) who later sets out to find his mother with the help of a soothsayer. The mother-searching motif is repeated in "Dong Yong Meets an Immortal" (董永遇仙傳), a longer story discovered in a mid-sixteenth-century collection by Hong Bian (洪楩) but probably dates from the fifteenth century or earlier, in which Dong Yong's son is the famous Confucian sage Dong Zhongshu (179–104 BC). In this tale the couple both meet and depart under a scholartree, which Weaver Girl suggests could serve as their matchmaker during their first encounter. Dong Yong becomes an official after presenting Weaver Girl's brocades to the emperor and he also marries Fu Saijin (傅賽金), the master's daughter, after Weaver Girl's return to Heaven.

Dong Yong's legend continued to evolve after Chinese theatre began to flourish in the thirteenth century. Some scholars believe "Dong Yong Meets an Immortal" was derived from a nanxi (or xiwen). In a fragment of a zaju play from a sixteenth-century collection, the last parent Dong Yong buries is his mother rather than his father. Unfortunately all of the chuanqi plays Weaving Brocade (織錦記), Weaving Silk (織絹記), Selling Oneself (賣身記), and The Heavenly Immortal (天仙記) from the Ming dynasty (1368–1644) have not survived in full text, but they had added to the lore. For example, in Weaving Brocade by an actor named Gu Jueyu (顧覺宇), Fu Saijin is Weaver Girl's best friend on Earth, but her brother is a lecher who tries to make a move on Weaver Girl only to receive a slap on the face. Their father is now a prefect named Fu Hua (傅華).

=== Dong Yong and the Seventh Fairy ===
Developing in parallel to the legend of Dong Yong and the Weaver Girl is the legend of the Cowherd and the Weaver Girl, another love story with an earlier origin. By late imperial times the need to avoid infidelity on the part of Weaver Girl resulted in some versions presenting Dong Yong as an incarnation of the Cowherd Boy. A more efficient solution was to separate the two tales: Dong Yong's Weaver Girl became identified with the youngest of the Seven Fairies (as in Weaving Brocade,) whose eldest sister married the Cowherd. As Wilt L. Idema explains, the proliferation of Chinese opera during this time period played an important part in shifting this Confucian and didactic legend to a story about love (where hints of infidelity would be considered highly problematic):

As long as the legend circulated in narrative form, it could be told from a purely male perspective. From such a perspective, the "immortal beauty" could be treated as an object: a gift from the Jade Emperor to reward a filial son. Once the legend was adapted for the stage, however, the conventions of chuanqi plays of the Ming and Qing, as a form of opera, required that the male and female protagonists be given equal opportunity to declare their mutual love in song. From that moment onward, the legend of Dong Yong and Weaving Maiden became a tale of true but thwarted love...

As a result, "Weaver Girl" or zhinü in Dong Yong's tale was soon replaced by that of the Seventh Fairy, the seventh daughter of the Jade Emperor. "The Shady Scholartree" (槐蔭記) is a wange (挽歌, a quyi or narrative singing genre performed during funerals) from Hunan Province and dated to the final years of the Qing dynasty (1644–1911). Here the maiden's sisters also take part in the story: the Seventh Fairy receives a magical orchid incense from them; when she burns it at Squire Fu's house, her six sisters arrive to help her weave ten pounds of thread in one night.

In early-20th-century New Culture Movement, filial piety came under attack as free love became dominant in popular culture. With the founding of the People's Republic in 1949 came a campaign to reform traditional plays. In 1953, Lu Hongfei (陆洪非, also known as Hong Fei 洪非) from Anhui Province came up with a new Huangmei opera version of the Dong Yong legend. Dong Yong's filial piety is mentioned "only in passing" and the Seventh Fairy is now marrying a mortal against her father's wishes! When Jade Emperor notices her absence, he demands her return; the Seventh Fairy reluctantly obeys him to save Dong Yong's life. Class struggle, the new concern of the times, was also emphasized by turning Squire Fu into an evil landlord and Dong Yong into an exploited peasant. In 1955, the new Huangmei opera was filmed as Married to a Heavenly Fairy (天仙配), starring Yan Fengying as the Seventh Fairy. The film enjoyed spectacular success throughout the Chinese-speaking world. Huangmei opera, previously a minor regional form of Chinese opera, was featured in many films in Hong Kong and Taiwan following its release. (The 1963 Hong Kong film A Maid from Heaven (七仙女) starring Ivy Ling Po as Dong Yong is also a Huangmei opera adaptation of this tale.)

== Dong Yong in Zhuang culture ==
The story of Dong Yong in Shanglin County and Mashan County in central Guangxi Zhuang Autonomous Region, where ritual masters and their singers narrate stories in the Zhuang language on special occasions, is markedly different from that in Han Chinese areas. Here, the story is set in a time when the custom was to kill one's gravely ill parents and cannibalize their flesh with the rest of the community — a practice stopped by Dong Yong, the story goes. One day, after seeing a painful birth by a buffalo (or goat), a distressed Dong Yong promises his mother that he will not eat her body after her death. He stops eating other people's flesh but rather dries, smokes, and stores the portions given to him. When, eventually his mother falls ill and dies, he secretly buries her in the mountains. When relatives and neighbors come for her flesh, Dong Yong gives them his smoked flesh. The rest of the story about him selling his labor for her proper burial and meeting the heavenly maiden, appears to come from the Chinese story. Researcher David Holm, after examining Zhuang and Bouyei manuscripts in Guizhou Province and other parts of Guangxi, concludes:

It seems as if what has happened here is that two different stories have been amalgamated, one a Zhuang and Bouyei story about Doengvingx (or Daegvingx), and one a Chinese story about Dong Yong. The Zhuang and Bouyei story is basically about the origin of funeral customs, while the Chinese story is about something else entirely.
