= The Heavenly Maiden and the Woodcutter =

Korean folk tale

The Heavenly Maiden and The Woodcutter is a Korean folktale about the marriage between a human woodcutter and a heavenly nymph, whom he forces to be his wife after stealing her clothes. The tale has been compared to the swan maiden, a character from Eurasian tales that appears in a similar narrative.

== Other titles ==
The tale is also known as The Fairy and the Woodcutter (Korean: 선녀와 나무꾼; MR: Sŏnnyŏwa namukkun), or "The Woodcutter and the Heavenly Maiden/Nymph" (나무꾼과 선녀; Namukkun'gwa sŏnnyŏ).

== Summary ==
In a version of the tale published by Jeong In-seop (정인섭), a young unmarried man lives at the foot of the Diamond Mountain, and earns his living by gathering firewood in the forest. One day, while he is busy in his task of cutting down wood, a deer rushes to his side and asks for his help. The young man agrees to aid the animal and hides it under a pile of firewood. A hunter comes right after and questions the man about the deer, but he feigns ignorance and goes his way. After the danger has passed, the deer, in gratitude, promises to help the young man find himself a wife: if he continues his journey up the Diamond Mountain, he will find pools of water where eight heavenly maidens will come from the skies to bathe in the ponds; he can make one of the maidens his wife if he hides her under-garments, and bids him never return her the garments, only after she has given birth to three children.

With this information, the young woodcutter decides to check on the ponds for himself the next morning, and climbs to the top of the Diamond Mountain. He waits for the arrival of the maidens: they descend a rainbow, land on earth and place their garments near a pine tree. While the girls play and splash in the water, the woodcutter steals the garments of the youngest maiden, and lies in waiting for their departure. At sunset, the maidens finish their playtime, don the garments and fly back to Heaven, save for the youngest of them, left stranded on Earth. The woodcutter approaches her to comfort her, and takes her down the mountain.

The woodcutter and the maiden live together and she bears him one son, then another son. After the second child's birth, the maiden asks her husband to show her the garments. Suspecting something and remembering the deer's words, he still retains the clothes for another while. Finally, the maiden gives birth to a third child, and insists to be shown her garments, but assuages her husband's fears. Trusting his wife, the woodcutter gives her the stolen garments. The maiden puts on the garments, takes her children and flies away back to Heaven.

Surprised at this event, the woodcutter falls into a state of grief, then decides to search for his wife back at the place he first found her: the top of the Diamond Mountain. On the way, he meets the same deer he helped once, and the animal reveals the maidens have not returned to bathe in the ponds since he stole the garments, but he can still see his family again: he has to go to the same place, and wait until a bottle-gourd is roped down from the Heavens, which he is to grab and climb up to the heavenly realm.

Following the deer's advice once again, the woodcutter goes go the area of the ponds and waits for the bottle-gourd. It happens as the deer described, and he grabs the object to the roped up to Heavens. Once he arrives there, the Heavenly Maidens notice that there is a mortal among them, and his wife's father, the Heavenly King, welcomes the woodcutter to his kingdom. The woodcutter meets his family and lives there in contentment, until, one day, he begins to miss his earthly home and his mother.

He decides to pay a visit to his mother, despite his heavely wife's pleas that he may not return, and is given a magical dragon-horse that takes the woodcutter back to Earth. He reaches his mother's house, who is happy to see him again, and brings him a bowl of porridge. However, the bowl is so hot it startles the dragon-horse, which flies back to the Heavens, leaving the woodcutter stranded on Earth and unable to meet his family ever again. He spends his days in grief, until the day he is transformed into a rooster, and this explains why roosters climb up the highest place during their matinal crowing.

== Analysis ==
=== Tale type ===
The tale is classified in the international Aarne-Thompson-Uther Index as type ATU 400, "The Man on a Quest for the Lost Wife": the hero finds a maiden of supernatural origin (e.g., the swan maiden) or rescues a princess from an enchantment; either way, he marries her, but she disappears to another place, and he goes on a long quest after her.

==== Variations ====
Scholarship separates four kinds of narratives, according to the continuation of the story: (1) the celestial maiden escapes and never returns; (2) the husband reaches the celestial realm through a vine or another type of ladder to the upper world; (3) the husband reaches the upper realm and is forced to perform tasks for his wife's family; (4) the husband returns to Earth because he misses his mother. The third narrative is considered to be the most collected type of the tale in Korea. In the fourth redaction (husband's return to his mother), the mortal husband turns into a rooster - a sequence "only found in Korea".

According to Ross King, researchers Ch'oe and Kim divided the narrative into three versions: (1) tales that lack the woodcutter's journey to heaven; (2) tales wherein the woodcutter follows his wife to the heavenly realm and is forced to fulfill tasks for a heavenly deity; and (3) tales that show the woodcutter's return to Earth.

Another classification focuses on the fate or decision of the celestial wife: she is stranded on Earth forever; she finds her flying garment and returns to the Heavens; she still finds the garment, but decides to stay for the sake of her child(ren).

== Regional tales ==
According to scholar James H. Grayson, the tale is common in Korea and variants are found "throughout the peninsula", with at least 25 tales recorded. Some scholars suggest a migration of Korean swan maiden tales to Japan.

In the tale Son-Nyo the Nymph and the Woodcutter, a woodcutter lives at the foot of the Diamond Mountain, in Gangwon Province. In the woods, he hides a deer from a hunter. In gratitude, the deer tells she is the daughter of the Mountain God and directs the woodcutter to a pool where seven nymphs, the son-nyo, will bathe. He steals the robe of one of them and marries her. Years later, after the birth of their third child, the maiden insists on wearing her robe to show her children. The husband returns the robe and she flies back to the skies with the children. Dismayed, the deer tells him of a way to reach the skies: by entering a bucket they use to draw water from Earth. He does and reaches the Heavens to be with his wife and children. However, after a while, the woodcutter begins to feel homesick and wants to visit his mother, but his wife warns him that he might not return. Despite the warning, the human goes down to earth on a horse which he is to not dismount for any reason, and goes to visit his aging mother. This tale is classified as type 400. This version of the tale is also known as The Deer and the Woodcutter.

In a Korean tale published by Eleanore Myers Jewett with the title The Wife From Another World, a handsome poor youth named Chang Py-ong lives by the foot of a mountain. One day, a frightened stag appears to him in a clearing, fleeing from some hunters, and Py-ong offers to hide the animal under some leaves until the hunters pass them by. The hunters ask Py-ong about the stag, but he feigns ignorance. After the hunters ride to another direction, the stag thanks Chang Py-ong and offers to indicate where the youth can find himself a wife: beyond the forest and up the mountain, a valley exists with a spring where maidens from the Other World come to bathe in, and he is to steal the "shining wings" from the one he fancies best. The youth mulls over the information for a bit, but trusts the stag and decides to look for the spring. As a last piece of advice, the stag warns the youth not to return her the wings, despite her feelings of homesickness, and supposes that, if she ever returns home, she would not abandon her children here on Earth. Chang Py-ong follows the stag's directions and climbs up the mountain until he reaches the springs the maidens bathe in. As soon as he approaches, he hears the sounds of folding wings and laughter of the dozen maidens from the Other World. He quickly hides the wings from the most beautiful of them, waits until the group flies back whence they came and abandon their friend. It happens thus, and Py-ong materializes from behind the bushes to console the stranded spirit-maiden, then takes her down the mountain to his house, where he was being expected with a marriage feast. Py-ong and the spirit-maiden marry and have three beautiful children. After the birth of each children, the spirit-maiden begins to feel homesick, which pains Py-ong, but he remembers the stag's advice and does not return her wings. However, feeling guilty for his wife's sadness, he decides to show her the wings. She places them on, grabs her children and flies away to the Other World. Months pass, and Py-ong grieves for his missing family, until he decides to go to the same pools where he first found his wife. On the way there, the same stag appears to him. This time, the stag advises him to go to the seventh pool in the pool area, wait for the twilight hour, and he will see a bucket being roped down to fetch water for the spirit world. Trusting the stag again, he makes the same rout to the ppol, finds the bucket and climbs on it. The bucket is roped through the clouds to the upper world, and Py-ong finds his wife and children again, who welcome him to the upper world.

== See also ==
- Chilseok
- Tian Xian Pei (Chinese folktale)
