= Wang Xiang =

Chinese senior official of Cao Wei and Western Jin (184–268)

- 王祥
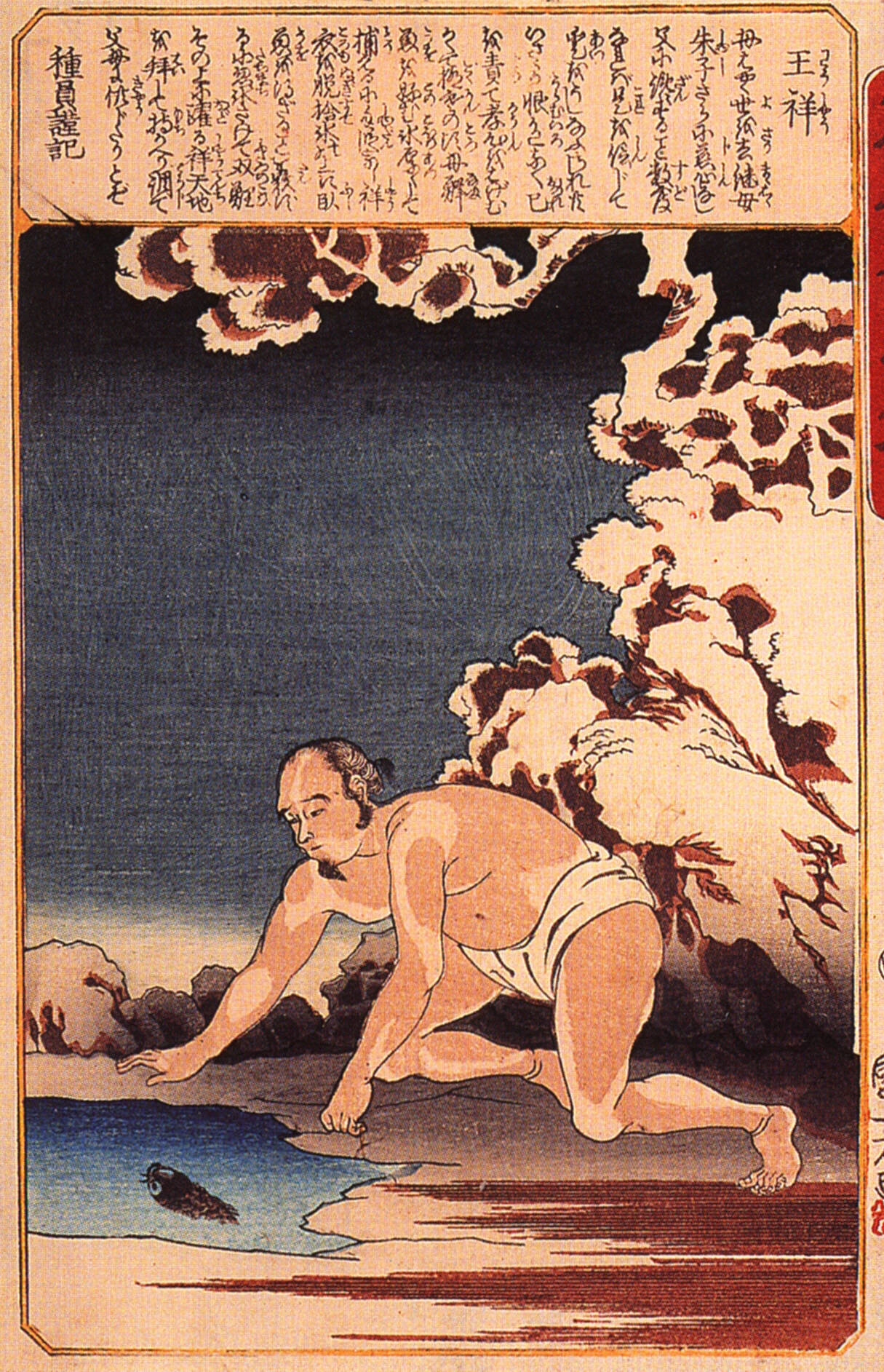
- Wang Xiang lies on an icy pond to catch koi with his body heat, depicted in an ukiyo-e print by Utagawa Kuniyoshi

Grand Protector (太保)
- In office 266 – 268
- Monarch: Emperor Wu of Jin

Palace Attendant (侍中)
- In office 264 – 266
- Monarch: Cao Huan

Grand Commandant (太尉)
- In office 30 April 264 – 266
- Monarch: Cao Huan
- Preceded by: Deng Ai

Minister of Works (司空)
- In office 2 February 261 – 30 April 264
- Monarch: Cao Huan
- Preceded by: Wang Guan
- Succeeded by: Xun Yi

Minister of Ceremonies (太常)
- In office 255 – 2 February 261
- Monarch: Cao Mao / Cao Huan

Colonel-Director of Retainers (司隸校尉)
- In office 254 – 255
- Monarch: Cao Mao

Minister of the Household (光祿勳)
- In office 254 – 255
- Monarch: Cao Mao

Minister of Finance (大司農)
- In office ?–?

Prefect of Wen (County) (溫令)
- In office ?–?

Personal details
- Born: 184 Linyi, Shandong
- Died: 30 April 268 (aged 84)
- Relations: Lady Zhu (stepmother); Wang Rui (uncle); Wang Lan (half-brother)
- Children: Wang Zhao; Wang Xia; Wang Fu; Wang Lie; Wang Fen
- Parents: Wang Rong (father); Lady Xue (mother)
- Occupation: Politician
- Courtesy name: Xiuzheng (休徵)
- Posthumous name: Duke Yuan (元公)
- Peerage: Duke of Suiling (睢陵公)

Wang Xiang (Note: not to be confused with the Cao Wei official who took part in the compilation of Huanglan) (184 – 30 April 268), courtesy name Xiuzheng, was a Chinese politician who lived through the late Eastern Han dynasty (25–220), the Three Kingdoms period (220–280), and the early Western Jin dynasty (266–316) of China. He served in the highest positions in the government, including Minister of Works (司空) and Grand Commandant (太尉) in the Cao Wei state during the Three Kingdoms period, and Grand Protector (太保) during the Western Jin dynasty. He was also one of The Twenty-four Filial Exemplars.

== Family background ==
Wang Xiang's ancestor was Wang Ji (王吉), who served as a Counsellor Remonstrant (諫議大夫) in the Western Han dynasty. His grandfather, Wang Ren (王仁), served as the Inspector (刺史) of Qing Province in the Eastern Han dynasty. His uncle, Wang Rui (王叡; died 189), served as the Inspector of Jing Province and was killed by the warlord Sun Jian. According to the New Book of Tang, Wang Xiang was a descendant of Qin general Wang Ben.

Wang Xiang's father, Wang Rong (王融), turned down offers to serve in the government and remained a commoner throughout his life. Wang Xiang's mother, Lady Xue (薛氏), was from Gaoping County (高平縣; northwest of present-day Weishan County, Shandong). She presumably died early as Wang Rong took a second wife, Lady Zhu (朱氏), who bore him another son, Wang Lan (王覽).

== Early life ==
Wang Xiang was born in the chaotic era towards the end of the Eastern Han dynasty when various warlords were fighting for power throughout the Han Empire. Around the time, Wang Xiang's only surviving family members were his stepmother Lady Zhu and half-brother Wang Lan. They fled from their home in Langya Commandery (琅邪郡; around present-day Linyi, Shandong) and headed south to Lujiang Commandery (廬江郡; around present-day Lu'an, Anhui), where they lived in seclusion for over 20 years. During this time, Wang Xiang received invitations to serve as an official in the local commandery office but he turned them down.

== Service in Cao Wei ==
During the Three Kingdoms period, Lü Qian, an official of the Cao Wei state serving as the Inspector of Xu Province, wanted to recruit Wang Xiang to be an Assistant Officer (別駕) under him. Wang Xiang initially refused but relented after his half-brother Wang Lan urged him to accept. Lü Qian put Wang Xiang in charge of civil and domestic affairs in Xu Province. During his tenure, he implemented educational policies and sent soldiers to deal with bandits in the region. His successful policies earned him much respect and praise from the people in Xu Province.

In recognition of his achievements, Wang Xiang was nominated as a maocai (茂才; an outstanding civil service candidate) and appointed as the Prefect (令) of Wen County (溫縣; east of present-day Mengzhou, Henan). Later on, he was promoted to the position of Minister of Finance (大司農) in the central government. In 254, Wang Xiang supported the regent Sima Shi in deposing the third Wei emperor, Cao Fang, and replacing with him Cao Mao. As a reward for Wang Xiang's support, Sima Shi awarded him the title of a Secondary Marquis (關內侯) and appointed him as Minister of the Household (光祿勳), but later reassigned him to be Colonel-Director of Retainers (司隸校尉). In 255, when the generals Guanqiu Jian and Wen Qin started a rebellion in Shouchun (壽春; present-day Shou County, Anhui), Wang Xiang accompanied Sima Shi as he led imperial forces to suppress the revolt. After the rebellion was crushed, Sima Shi appointed Wang Xiang as Minister of Ceremonies (太常) and promoted him from a Secondary Marquis to a village marquis under the title "Marquis of Wansui Village" (萬歲亭侯). As Minister of Ceremonies, Wang Xiang served as a tutor to the young emperor Cao Mao and taught him the ways of a ruler.

In June 260, Cao Mao, no longer willing to be a puppet emperor, staged a coup d'état to seize back power from the regent Sima Zhao (Sima Shi's brother). However, he ended up being assassinated by Cheng Ji (成濟), an officer under Sima Zhao's close aide Jia Chong. During Cao Mao's funeral, elderly (Note: He was then about 76 years old.) Wang Xiang wept bitterly and said, "I, an old minister, am so unworthy!" His words made some of the officials who attended Cao Mao's funeral feel ashamed of themselves. In 261, during the reign of the fifth Wei emperor Cao Huan, Wang Xiang was promoted to Minister of Works. In 264, he was reassigned to be Grand Commandant (太尉) and given an additional role as a Palace Attendant (侍中). In the same year, Sima Zhao restored the five-rank nobility system, which was previously abolished, and enfeoffed Wang Xiang as the Duke of Suiling (睢陵侯) with a dukedom comprising 1,600 taxable households.

== Service under the Jin dynasty ==
In February 266, following Sima Zhao's death in September 265, his son Sima Yan (Emperor Wu) usurped the throne from Cao Huan, ended the Cao Wei state and established the Jin dynasty with himself as the emperor. After his coronation, Emperor Wu appointed Wang Xiang as Grand Protector (太保) and allowed him to keep his peerage as the Duke of Suiling.

By then, Wang Xiang, He Zeng (何曾), Zheng Chong (鄭沖), and some former Wei officials were already in their old age, so it was no longer convenient for them to regularly attend imperial court sessions. Emperor Wu thus sent Ren Kai (任愷), then a Palace Attendant (侍中), to visit them and seek their advice on policy matters.

Wang Xiang, then already in his 80s, sought permission on a number of occasions from Emperor Wu to retire, but the emperor refused. Hou Shiguang (侯史光), a Palace Assistant Imperial Clerk (御史中丞), once asked Emperor Wu to dismiss Wang Xiang because Wang Xiang had been absent from imperial court sessions for a long time due to poor health. However, as Emperor Wu respected and favoured Wang Xiang, he ordered the Imperial Censorate (御史台; in charge of keeping track of officials' performance in office) to make an exception for Wang Xiang. He also allowed Wang Xiang to remain in office and continue drawing his salary, even though Wang Xiang spent most of his time at home. Wang Xiang died in April 268 at the age of 85 (by East Asian age reckoning) and was awarded the posthumous title "Duke Yuan" (元公). Hence, he was formally referred to as "Duke Yuan of Suiling".

== Family ==
Wang Xiang's younger half-brother, Wang Lan (王覽; 206–278), served as a Household Counsellor (光祿大夫) under the Jin dynasty. Lan was also the grandfather of Wang Dun and Wang Dao, and a fourth-generation ancestor of the famous calligrapher Wang Xizhi. Thus, both Wang Xiang and Wang Lan laid the foundations for the growth of the Wang clan of Langya.

Some known descendants of Wang Xiang are as follows:

- Wang Zhao (王肇), Wang Xiang's first son born to a concubine. He served as a Cavalry Commandant (騎都尉), an Official Who Concurrently Serves in the Palace (給事中), and the Administrator of Shiping (始平太守) under the Jin dynasty.
  - Wang Jun (王俊), Wang Zhao's son, served as an assistant to the crown prince, later enfeoffed as the Marquis of Yongshi (永世侯).
    - Wang Xia (王遐), Wang Jun's son, served as the Administrator of Yulin (鬱林太守).
- Wang Xia (王夏), Wang Xiang's first son born to his wife, died early.
- Wang Fu (王馥), Wang Xiang's second son born to his wife, inherited his father's peerage as the Duke of Suiling. He served as the Administrator of Shangluo (上洛太守).
  - Wang Gen (王根), Wang Fu's son, inherited his father's peerage as the Duke of Suiling.
- Wang Lie (王烈), Wang Xiang's son born to a concubine, died early.
- Wang Fen (王芬), Wang Xiang's son born to a concubine, died around the same time as Wang Lie.

== See also ==
- Lists of people of the Three Kingdoms
