= Seven Fairies (China) =

Characters in Chinese folklore

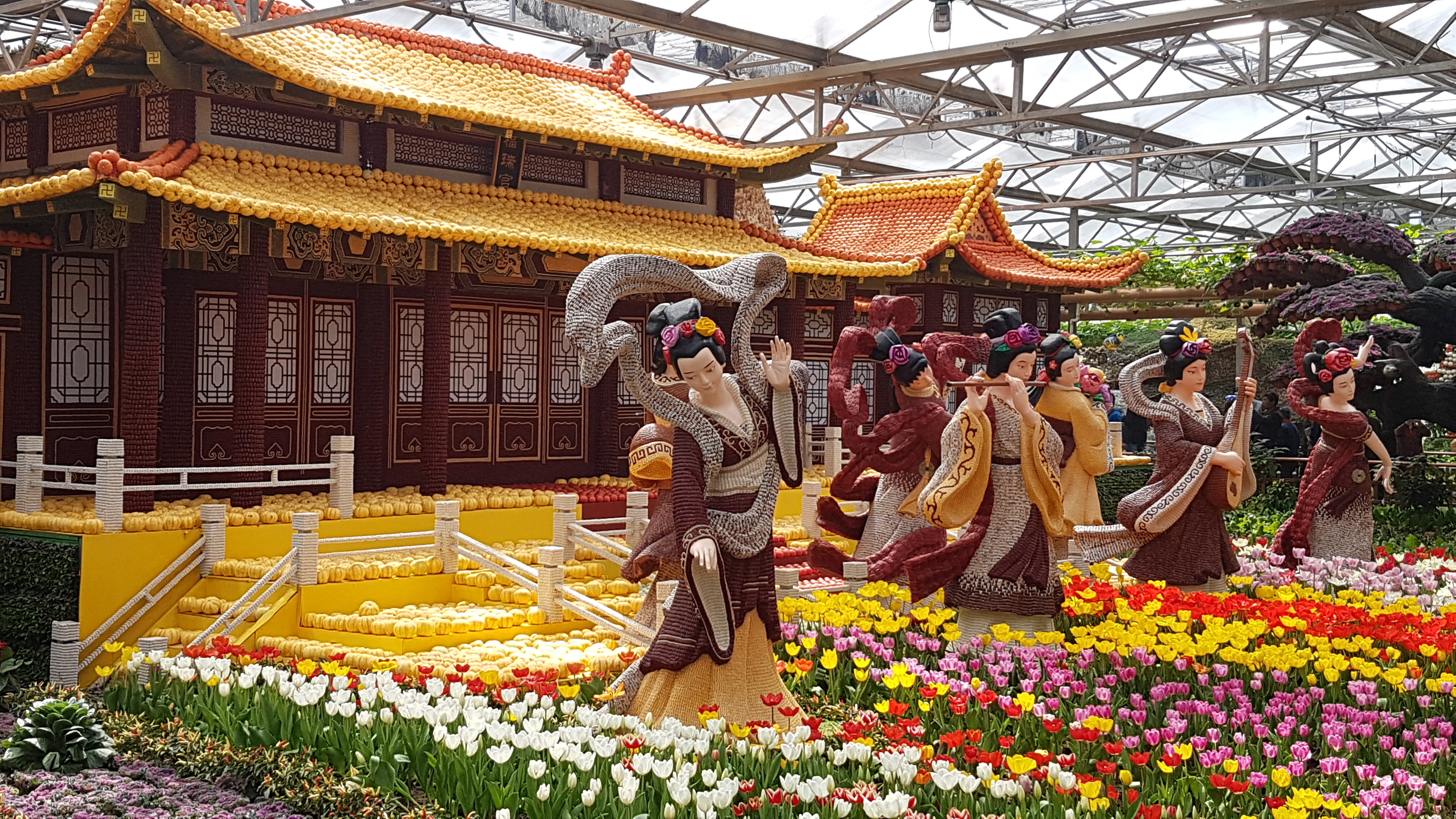
Sculptures of the Seven Fairies (all made from plant materials) on display during the 2017 China (Shouguang) International Vegetable Sci-Tech Fair, Shouguang, Shandong Province.

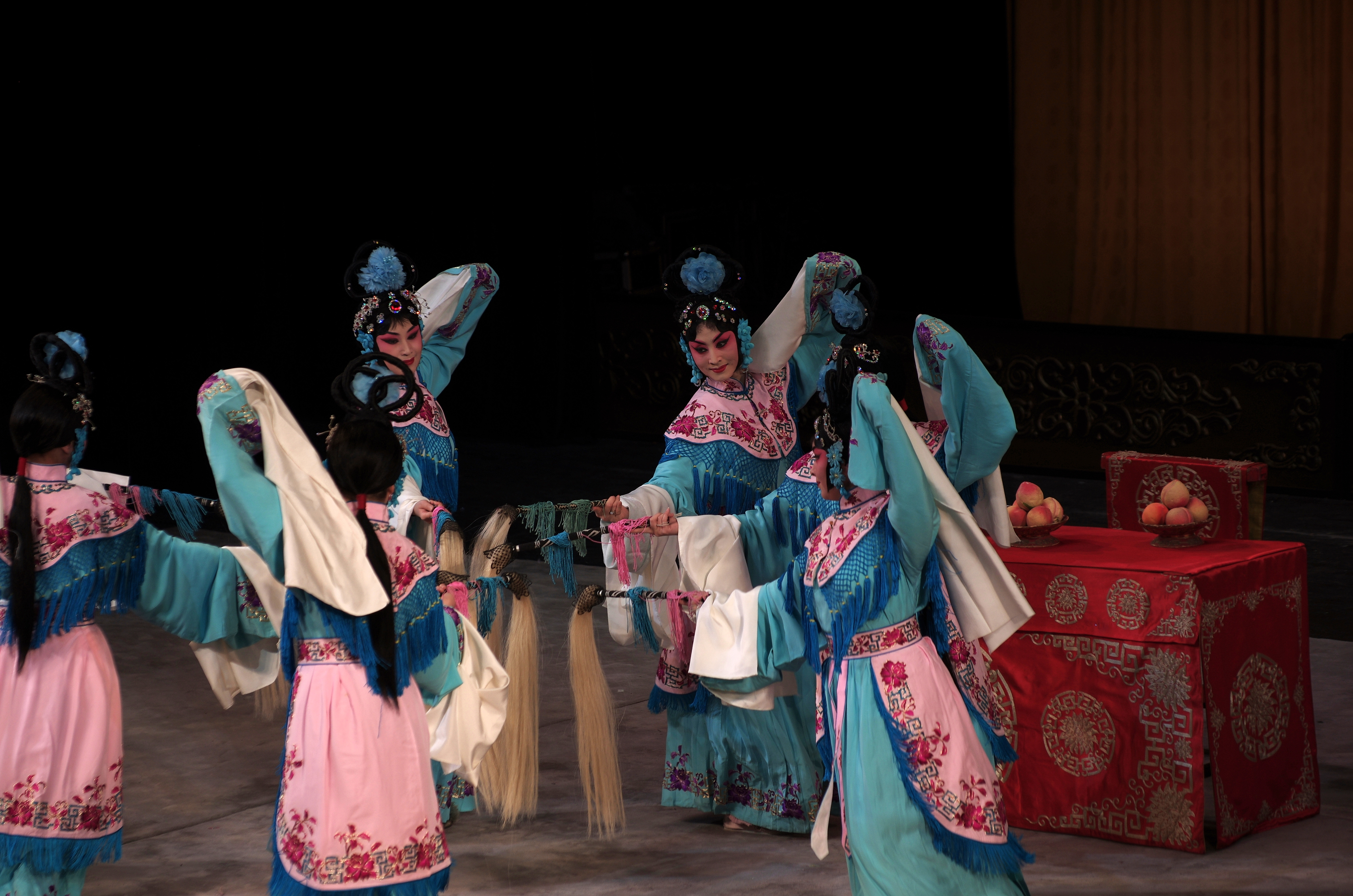
The Seven Fairies appear in the Peking opera Havoc in Heaven, which is based on Journey to the West.

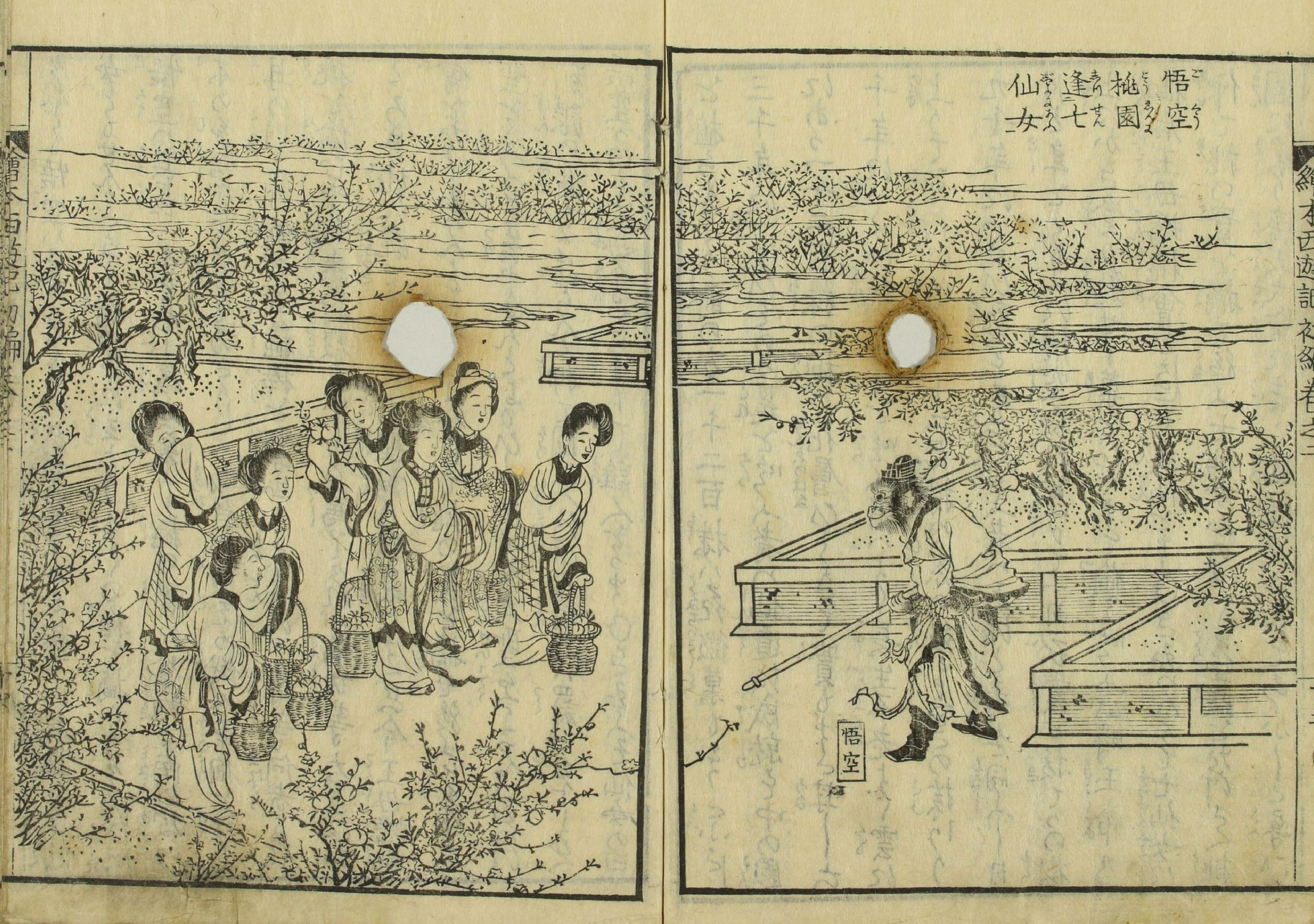
Sun Wukong the Monkey King meets the Seven Fairies, a 19th-century illustration by Ōhara Tōya (大原東野).

In Chinese folklore and mythology, the Seven Fairies (Chinese: 七仙女) are the seven daughters of Jade Emperor and Queen Mother of the West.

In modern times, the Seven Fairies are best known for their parts in the Dong Yong and the Seventh Fairy legend.

== "The Bird Maidens" ==
"The Bird Maidens" (毛衣女), a tale from the fourth-century collection In Search of the Supernatural (which contains a different tale for Dong Yong), mentions a man in Xinyu (in Jiangxi Province) discovering "six or seven young maidens in a field, all wearing wonderful feather garments". He marries one of the girls after stealing her feathered robe so that she can't fly off, but one day she finds her robe and flies away. She later returns and flies off with their three daughters. A similar record is found in Guo Pu's Mythical Tales (玄中記) from the same period. This "quasi-Swan Maiden" story was possibly told to explain why some large birds carried off children.

Today, Xinyu has a reservoir and tourist resort named Fairy Lake (仙女湖) which claims to be "the hometown of the legend of the Seven Fairies of China".

== In Journey to the West ==
In Journey to the West, the Queen Mother of the West wants to host a peach party so she sends the Seven Fairies to the peach garden:

[She] told the fairy maidens, Red Jacket, Blue Jacket, White Jacket, Black Jacket, Purple Jacket, Yellow Jacket and Green Jacket to take their baskets and pick peaches in the Peach Garden. (from Arthur Waley's translation.)

After plucking many peaches, one of the fairies accidentally awakens Sun Wukong (Monkey King), the "Great Sage, Equal of Heaven" now in charge of the garden. Sun Wukong asks them whether he is invited to the party. When they answer in the negative, a disappointed Sun Wukong casts a spell to transfix the fairies to the spot, before he heads straight for the Queen's palace.

== Dong Yong and the Seventh Fairy ==
The well-known story of Heaven sending a celestial maiden to assist the filial son Dong Yong first appeared in writing in the third century. For more than a millennium after the fourth century this maiden—Dong Yong's wife-to-be—was identified as Weaver Girl (zhinü): after all she was to help him on the loom. In late imperial times, however, the Weaver Girl was replaced in this legend by the Seventh Fairy, so as to avoid hints of infidelity because the Weaver Girl is also a protagonist in another old legend, The Cowherd and the Weaver Girl. (There have also been attempts to present Dong Yong as an incarnation of the Cowherd.)

Subsequently the other six fairies also became part of the plot: for example they present a magical incense to their youngest sister before her trip to the mortal world:

If you, Seventh Sister, are in danger, just burn this incense,
And we, your six sisters, will come down from heaven.
