= The Three Heroes and Five Gallants (2016 TV series) =

- poster
- Also known as: Three Heroes and Five Gallants
- Traditional Chinese: 五鼠鬧東京
- Simplified Chinese: 五鼠闹东京
- Literal meaning: The Five Rats Havoc in the Eastern Capital
- Hanyu Pinyin: Wǔ Shǔ Nào Dōng Jīng
- Based on: The Three Heroes and Five Gallants by Shi Yukun
- Directed by: Wu Chia-tai
- Starring: Chen Xiao; Yan Kuan; Zheng Shuang
- Opening theme: "Qingshan Gao" (青山高) by Yumu
- Ending theme: "Buru Huainian" (不如懷念) performed by Chen Chusheng
- Country of origin: China
- Original language: Mandarin
- No. of episodes: 44

Production
- Executive producer: Wang Xin
- Producer: Li Gongda
- Running time: 45 minutes
- Production companies: Huayi Brothers; Tianxing Yiyuan Entertainment

Original release
- Network: Anhui Television
- Release: 17 February 2016

The Three Heroes and Five Gallants is a 2016 Chinese television series produced by Huayi Brothers with Tianxing Yiyuan Entertainment (天星亿源影视), based on the 19th-century classic novel of the same name. Starring Chen Xiao, Yan Yikuan and Zheng Shuang, the series premiered on February 17, 2016, on Anhui TV.

== Cast ==
- Chen Xiao as Bai Yutang
- Yan Yikuan as Zhan Zhao
- Zheng Shuang as Ding Yuehua
- Liang Guanhua as Bao Zheng
- Liu Dekai as Emperor Renzong of Song
- Ma Shuliang as Pang Ji
- Xie Ning as Xu Qing
- Rao Xiaozhi as Pang Yu
- Li Xinyu as Consort Pang
- He Yu as Lu Fang
- Wang Daqi as Han Zhang
- Wang Maolei as Jiang Ping
- Han Zhengguo as Gongsun Ce
- Wu Jing as Sha Qiukui
- Zhang Zhixi as Jin Yalan
- Zhang Wei Na as Ji Saihua
- Xue Qi as Wang Chao
- Diao Biao as Ma Han
- Li Tianqi as Zhang Long
- Zhu Jing as Zhao Hu
- Guan Xin as Bao Xing
- Li Tiannuo as Yan Fei
- Niu Baoping as Pang Wang
- Hong Bo as Deng Che
- Zhang Jianli as Liu Wang

== Ratings ==
Air date	Episode	Anhui TV ratings					Sichuan TV ratings			
Air date	Episode	Ratings	Audience share	Rank	Ratings	Audience share	Rank	Ratings	Audience share	Rank
2016.02.17	1-2	0.781	2.009	6	0.86	2.169	6	0.38	1.03	9
2016.02.18	3-4	0.767	2.002	6	0.848	2.162	6	0.35	0.95	11
2016.02.19	5-6	0.747	1.903	7	0.82	2.042	6	0.48	1.28	6
2016.02.20	7-8	0.614	1.62	10	0.663	1.705	10	0.37	0.99	8
2016.02.21	9-10	0.67	1.7	9	0.724	1.801	9	0.37	0.98	11
2016.02.22	11-12	0.605	1.527	7	0.663	1.645	8	0.33	0.89	5
2016.02.23	13-14	0.817	2.135	6	0.901	2.306	6	—	—	—
2016.02.24	15-16	0.758	2.019	5	0.828	2.157	5	0.39	1.07	7
2016.02.25	17-18	0.887	1.59	5	0.958	2.49	5	0.49	1.36	6
2016.02.26	19-20	0.841	2.175	5	0.906	2.292	5	0.45	1.2	6
2016.02.27	21-22	0.699	1.86	5	0.751	1.958	6	0.42	1.15	8
2016.02.28	23-24	0.726	1.89	5	0.788	2.009	5	0.37	1.03	9
2016.02.29	25-26	0.730	1.966	6	0.784	2.064	6	0.42	1.21	7
2016.03.01	27-28	0.882	2.4	6	0.965	2.568	4	0.53	1.52	6
2016.03.02	29-30	0.818	2.18	7	0.89	2.316	7	0.52	1.48	5
2016.03.03	31-32	0.873	2.358	5	0.955	0.525	4	0.52	1.49	6
2016.03.04	33-34	0.918	2.377	5	1.009	2.545	4	0.53	1.44	6
2016.03.05	35-36	0.834	2.149	7	0.909	2.296	7	0.56	1.53	6
2016.03.06	37-38	0.854	2.227	7	0.922	2.354	7	0.58	1.62	6
2016.03.07	39-40	0.784	2.005	7	0.854	2.187	6	0.59	1.69	6
2016.03.08	41-42	0.841	2.220	7	0.911	2.355	6	0.55	1.55	6
2016.03.09	43-44	0.875	2.24	7	0.957	2.401	6	0.57	1.55	7

== International broadcast ==
- China – Anhui Television (17 February 2016)
- Malaysia – Astro Quan Jia HD (24 May 2016)
- Hong Kong – TVB Chinese Drama (23 August 2016)
- Taiwan – Long Turn TV (13 September 2016)
- Canada – Talentvision (5 October 2016)

== Theme songs ==
#	Title	Singer	Songwriter	Notes
1	"Qingshan Gao" (青山高) (translation: Green Mountain High)	Yu Mu		Opening song
2	"Buru Huainian" (不如懷念) (translation: Better to Reminisce)	Chen Chusheng	Jin Wenqi	Ending song
3	"Zhidao Yujian Ni" (直到遇見你) (translation: Until I Met You)	Jin Wenqi		
4	"Ran Ye" (燃夜) (translation: Burning Night)	Liu Minghui	Wang Zhuo	
5	"Jianghu Shaonian Xing" (江湖少年行) (translation: A Youth's Jianghu Journey)	Tian Yuejun	Wang Zhuo	
6	"Yi Zhi Jiangshan" (一紙江山) (translation: A Sheet of the Empire)	Tian Yuejun		
7	"Shi Zi Jue" (十字訣) (translation: Ten-Character Chant)	Ah Qiao		
