= The Three Heroes and Five Gallants (1991 TV series) =

- intertitle
- Also known as: Three Heroes and Five Gallants
- Traditional Chinese: 三俠五義
- Simplified Chinese: 三侠五义
- Hanyu Pinyin: Sān Xiá Wǔ Yì
- Based on: The Three Heroes and Five Gallants by Shi Yukun
- Written by: Wang Lian; Li Zhongcheng; Wang Shaopeng
- Directed by: Wang Shaopeng
- Starring: Shao Yinglun; Xun Feng; Li Jiabin; He Yan
- Country of origin: China
- Original language: Mandarin
- No. of episodes: 11

Production
- Cinematography: Chen Yongjun; Cai Erqing; Wang Guofu
- Editor: Chen Renjin
- Running time: 45 minutes
- Production company: Shanghai Cable Drama Television

The Three Heroes and Five Gallants is a 1991 Chinese television series produced by Shanghai Cable Drama Television (now part of Shanghai Media Group), based on the 19th-century classic novel of the same name (also known as The Seven Heroes and Five Gallants). It is considered the most faithful adaptation of the novel.

Most of the cast members were Chinese martial arts athletes, including Chinese swordsmanship national champion Xun Feng, who appeared in the 1982 classic film Shaolin Temple.

== Cast and characters ==
- Xun Feng as Zhan Zhao
- Shao Yinglun as Bai Yutang
- He Yan as Ding Yuehua
- Li Jiabin as Bao Zheng
- Zhang Xunling as Gongsun Ce
- Lu Weiqiang as Yan Chasan
- Wang Jiayi as Yumo
- Cheng Liuzhong as Lu Fang
- Tang Junliang as Han Zhang
- Li Zhanchun as Xu Qing
- Xi Weitang as Jiang Ping
- Cheng Gang as Ding Zhaolan
- Tang Jun as Liu Qing
- Wang Tongqing as Wang Chao
- Wang Wenjun as Ma Han
- Gan Shibin as Zhao Jue
- Zhou Guosheng as Hua Chong
- Xu Guanzhong as Deng Biao
- Zhang Wenlin as Pang Yu
