= King Cat =

1967 Hong Kong film by Hsu Tseng-hung

- Film poster
- 七俠五義
- Directed by: Hsu Tseng-hung
- Written by: Ting Shan-hsi
- Based on: The Seven Heroes and Five Gallants by Shi Yukun
- Produced by: Run Run Shaw
- Starring: Chang Yi; Chiao Chuang; Ting Hung
- Cinematography: Wang Yung-loong
- Edited by: Chiang Hsing-loong
- Music by: Wang Chu-jen
- Production company: Shaw Brothers Studio
- Release date: 5 December 1967
- Running time: 83 minutes
- Country: Hong Kong
- Language: Mandarin

King Cat (七俠五義) is a 1967 Hong Kong wuxia film loosely adapted from the 19th-century novel The Seven Heroes and Five Gallants by Shi Yukun. It was directed by Hsu Tseng-hung, produced by the Shaw Brothers Studio, and starred Chang Yi, Chiao Chuang, and Ting Hung.

== Synopsis ==
The film is set in 11th-century China during the Song dynasty. Pang Ji, the corrupt grand tutor, sends assassins to kill Bao Zheng, the upright prefect of the imperial capital Kaifeng, in revenge for sentencing his son to death. Zhan Zhao, a chivalrous knight-errant, saves Bao and receives the honorary title "King Cat" from Emperor Renzong. This incurs the jealousy and anger of "Brocade-Coated Rat" Bai Yutang, who takes his three sworn brothers – "Earth-Piercing Rat" Han Zhang, "Mountain-Boring Rat" Xu Qing, and "River-Overturning Rat" Jiang Ping – to Kaifeng to steal a treasure from the imperial palace and lure Zhan to fight them.

On their way home, the four Rats are confronted by Bai's girlfriend, "Nine-Tailed Phoenix" Ding Yuehua, who accuses them of raping and killing three palace maids during their heist. Infuriated by her lack of trust in them, Bai admits to the crimes and breaks up with Ding. The real culprit, however, is "Flowery Butterfly" Hua Chong, who is plotting with Pang Ji and his daughter Consort Pang to overthrow Emperor Renzong.

Hua tries to rape Ding, but flees when Zhan stops him. Ding, still believing that Bai is guilty, informs Zhan, who travels to the island where the four Rats and their fifth sworn brother – "Sky-Penetrating Rat" Lu Fang – are based. Zhan gets trapped under a fish pond, but is saved later by Ding and her two brothers Ding Zhaolan and Ding Zhaohui. Zhan clears the misunderstanding with the Rats. Jiang recalls overhearing a plot by Hua to rape Princess Yong'an when she visits a monastery.

The heroes and gallants team up and save the princess at the monastery, but discover that it is occupied by rebel forces. With support from imperial forces sent by Bao, they defeat the rebels and kill Hua. The Five Rats then return the treasure they stole, and Zhan starts a romantic relationship with Ding.

== Cast ==
- Chang Yi as Zhan Zhao
- Chiao Chuang as Bai Yutang
- Ting Hung as Ding Yuehua
- Ching Li as Jinhua
- Ching Miao as Bao Zheng
- Chin Feng as Emperor Renzong
- Ku Mei as Princess Yong'an
- Ku Wen-chung as Han Zhang
- Huang Tsung-hsing as Xu Qing
- Paul Wei as Jiang Ping
- Yang Chih-ching as Lu Fang
- Fang Mian as Gongsun Ce
- Cliff Lok as Bao Xing
- Lo Lieh as Hua Chong
- Tin Sam as Pang Ji
- Fan Dan as Pang Yu
- Helen Ma as Consort Pang
- Cheng Lei as Ding Zhaohui
- Chao Hsiung as Ding Zhaolan
- Wu Ma as Little Sun
