= The Seven Heroes and Five Gallants (1994 TV series) =

- intertitle
- Also known as: Seven Heroes and Five Gallants
- Traditional Chinese: 七俠五義
- Simplified Chinese: 七侠五义
- Hanyu Pinyin: Qī Xiá Wǔ Yì
- Created by: Hao Hsiao-tsu
- Developed by: Chen Mo-hsi
- Creative director: Wang Chin-lung
- Starring: Vincent Chiao; Chang Fu-chien; Danny Dun; Sun Xing; Yu An-shun; Tai Chih-yuan; Fu Lei; Lin Tzay-peir; Sze Yu; Chang Feng; Tien Feng
- Opening theme: "Yi Jian Tiaoqi Qiangu Qing" (一肩挑起千古情) performed by Shi Cun
- Composer: Hsi Yu-lung
- Country of origin: Taiwan
- Original language: Mandarin
- No. of episodes: 75

Production
- Executive producers: Chao Chin-hu; Lu Pao-chuan; Liu Cheng-liang
- Producer: Chao Ta-shen
- Cinematography: Lin Ho-lung
- Editor: Liang Ting-ting
- Running time: 45 minutes

Original release
- Network: Chinese Television System
- Release: June 1 – September 14, 1994

The Seven Heroes and Five Gallants is a 1994 Taiwanese television series produced by Chinese Television System (CTS) a few months after its prequel Justice Pao, which was also produced by Chao Ta-shen. Dozens of actors appeared in both series, but only Sze Yu and Tu Man-sheng reprised their roles. Fan Hung-hsuan and Lung Lung chose to portray new characters rather than their iconic roles.

== Cast ==
=== Main cast ===
- Chang Fu-chien as Bao Zheng
- Danny Dun as Gongsun Ce
- Vincent Chiao as Zhan Zhao
- Tsao Hua-hsing as Wang Chao
- Chang Hui-yang as Ma Han
- Chang Yu-ming as Zhang Long
- Hsueh Feng-chin as Zhao Hu
- Sze Yu as Emperor Renzong of Song
- Lin Tzay-peir as Lu Fang
- Pi Kao-chiao as Min Xiuxiu, Lu Fang's wife
- Yu An-shun as Han Zhang
- Fu Lei as Xu Qing
- Tai Chih-yuan as Jiang Ping
- Sun Xing as Bai Yutang
- Tien Feng as Zhao Demou, Prince of Xiangyang
- Chang Feng as Ji Gao, Zhao Demou's strategist

=== Other cast ===
Note: Some actors portrayed more than 1 character.

- Yu Hsiao-fan as Min
- Lung Lung as Tu Shan
- Tao Shu as Xu Qing's mother
- Yang Huai-min as Ge Qing
- Chiao Hua-kuo as Wu Liang
- Chiu Yu-ting as Imperial Consort Lan
- Fan Hung-hsuan as Zhao Defang
- Sally Chen as Xinci
- Pai Bing-bing as Gu Atao
- Lung Tien-hsiang as Hu Si
- Chang Yu-yen as Li Shuangshuang
- Chao Shu-hai as Liu Qingfeng
- Hu Chin as Princess Mei
- Lu I-lung as Li Quan
- Lee Yu-lin as Ma Yougong
- Huang Chung-yu as Wang Hao
- Liu Ming as Granny of Jiangning
- Lee Kwan as wineshop owner
- Sung Ta-min as Ping Jianqiu
- Wu Ma as Ping Chang
- Chiu Yu-ting as Liu Feng
- Tseng Ya-chun as Feng Hua
- Henry Lo as Huo Shisan
- Lin Tzu-you as Xiniang
- Wang Hau as Yin Zhongyu
- Mimi Kung as Zhao Ling
- Chang Liu-chiung as Empress Dowager Li
- Chao Shu-hai as Shao Jianbo
- Tang Fu-hsiung as Liu Yu
- Lung Lung as Lei Xinghe
- Cheng Hsiu-ying as Qingyan
- Yu Heng as Zhang Zhao
- Hu Hsiang-ping as Wang Tao
- Tu Shan-ni as Su Hong
- Chiao Hua-kuo as Lu Ping
- Lu I-lung as Yan Zhengcheng
- Huang Chung-yu as Xin Wu
- Lee Hsing-wen as Chai Xinnong
- Wang Yu-wen as Lu Zhu'er
- Fei Yun as Yang Bin
- Yang Tse-chung as Zhao Shiquan
- Fang Wen-lin as Min Rourou
- Tu Wei as Min Zhong
- Lu Ti as Min Ziqian
- Lee Yu-lin as Li Qi
- Doze Niu as Li Yuhou
- Chang Chen-huan as Wang Meng
- Lei Ming as Li Shichang
- Wang Chang-chih as Deng Pingnan
- Hsiao Chiang as Yun Wenqiu
- Henry Lo as Wang Shiquan
- Jimmy Ni as Xiao Tianchong
- Yang Ching-huang as He Mutian
- Wang Jung as Yun Bingzhong
- Wang Chang-chih as Peng Yi
- Wen Shuai as Xu Ziqing
- Chiao Hua-kuo as Xiao Tianlin
- Chang Chi-ping as Zhang Yue
- Yu Hsiao-fan as Hanqing
- Tu Man-sheng as Pang Ji
- Lee Yu-lin as Sun Xun
- Kou Feng as Mo Shanhu
- Wang Hsiang as Lu Bin
- Brenda Wang as Ouyang Yunyi
- Yang Huai-min as Helian Peng
- Yeung Chung-yan as Tang Shaojun
- Yu Hsiao-fan as Du Xinyu
- Chang Shun-hsing as Li Wen
- Lin Wen-pin as Li Wu
- Hsieh Pin-nan as Gao Feng
- Hsu Wen-chuan as Bao Xing
- Tsao Chien as Du Zhongheng
- Chiu Yu-ting as Shui Jiping
- Luo Bin as Li Junnian
- Wen Shuai as Jiang Changsheng
- Yan Chung as Lu Yifan
- Wang Chi-sheng as Gu Jian
- Na Ta-ke as Zhao Gang

== Segments ==
Episodes	Title	Directed by	Written by
1–9	"The Destined Emperor (眞命天子)"	Liang Kai-cheng	Tsai Wen-chieh
10–18	"Jiang Ping Gets Married (蔣平娶親)"	Wang Chung-kuang	Chan Man-kwai
19–27	"Dragon-Trussing Rope (綑龍索)"	Sun Chung	Lee Chang-min
28–35	"Heroes Shed No Tears (英雄無淚)"	TBA	Chen Man-ling
36–40	"The Princess Escapes an Arranged Marriage (公主逃婚)"	TBA	Chan Man-kwai
41–45	"Regrets of Two Beauties (雙姝怨)"	Liang Kai-cheng	Chen Man-ling
46–50	"Breaking Heavenly Laws in a Fury (怒犯天條)"	Hou Po-wei	Tsai Wen-chieh
51–55	"Tai Sui Villa (太歲莊)"	Teng Yu-ching	Teng Yu-kun, Lee Chang-min
56–61	"The Grand Tutor Returns to Office (太師還朝)"	Sun Chung	Chang Yung-hsiang
62–66	"Lord Bao Battles the Sorcerer King (包公鬥法王)"	Chao Yung	Chiao An
67–70	"The Phoenixes Fly (鳳凰于飛)"	Su Yuan-feng	Chen Man-ling
71–75	"A Beauty Like Jade, a Sword Like Rainbow (美人如玉劍如虹)"	Hou Po-wei	Chan Man-kwai

== Theme songs ==
#	Title	Singer	Lyricist	Composer	Notes
1	"Yijian Tiaoqi Qiangu Qing" (一肩挑起千古情) (translation: Carrying Millenniums of Passion On One Shoulder)	Shi Cun	Chang Yung-hsiang	Tsao Chun-hung	Opening song
2	"Jiu Yinyuan" (救姻緣) (translation: Save Marriage)	Huang An			Ending song (Ep. 1-42)
3	"Meng Sui Feng Piao" (夢隨風飄) (translation: The Dream Drifts with the Wind)	Tengger	Wang Wen-ching		Ending song (Ep. 43-75)
	"Meiren Ru Yun Jian Ru Hong" (美人如雲劍如虹) (translation: Beauties Like Clouds, Swords Like Rainbow)	Sun Mingjie	Su La	Zhu Derong	Opening song (mainland China only)
	"Zoeng Gim Zau Cin Gaa" (仗劍走千家) (translation: Visiting A Thousand Houses with the Sword)	Ray Lui	?	Tsao Chun-hung (Cantonese cover of Track 1)	Opening song (Hong Kong only)
