= Justice Bao (2010 TV series) =

Chinese television series

- DVD cover of Season 1 (2010)
- Also known as: New Justice Bao
- Simplified Chinese: 包青天
- Hanyu Pinyin: Bāo Qīng Tiān
- Genre: crime fiction historical fiction wuxia gong'an fiction fantasy
- Written by: Qu Wei (Season 1); Song Guanyi (Season 1); Qu Fangting (Season 2); Yang Ming (Season 3)
- Directed by: Chen Lieh (Season 1); Wang Chi-sheng (Season 1); Tang Hao (Season 1); Tao Dongxin (Season 2); He Zhonghua (Season 3)
- Starring: Jin Chao-chun; Kenny Ho; Fan Hung-hsuan; Wang Shasha; Lung Lung; Yang Na
- Opening theme: "Qi Xia Wu Yi" (七俠五義)
- Composers: Hsi Yu-lung; Zhou Sixian
- Country of origin: China
- Original language: Mandarin
- No. of seasons: 3
- No. of episodes: 120

Production
- Executive producers: Kong Xiuling; Eddie Hung (Season 3)
- Producer: Jin Chao-chun
- Running time: 45 minutes/episode

Related
- Justice Bao (1993); Justice Bao (2008)

Justice Bao is a Chinese TV series starring producer Jin Chao-chun as the Song dynasty official Bao Zheng. The series ran for 3 seasons from 2010 to 2012. In addition to Jin, Kenny Ho, Fan Hung-hsuan and Lung Lung again reprise their iconic roles from the 1993 Taiwanese hit Justice Pao and the 2008 Chinese series Justice Bao.

== Seasons ==
Season	Episodes	Traditional Chinese Title	English Translation
#1 (2010)	40	七俠五義 (Qī Xiá Wǔ Yì)	The Seven Heroes and Five Gallants
#2 (2011)	40	碧血丹心 (Bì Xuè Dān Xīn)	Arbiter of Loyalty Unto Death
#3 (2012)	40	開封奇案 (Kāifēng Qí Àn)	Arbiter of Kaifeng Mystery

== Cast and characters ==
Note: Some cast members played multiple roles.

=== Main and recurring characters ===
Character	Season 1	Season 2	Season 3
Bao Zheng	Jin Chao-chun	Jin Chao-chun	Jin Chao-chun
Zhan Zhao	Kenny Ho	Kenny Ho	Kenny Ho
Gongsun Ce	Fan Hung-hsuan	Fan Hung-hsuan	Fan Hung-hsuan
Ai Hu	Wang Shasha	Wang Shasha	Wang Shasha
Consort Pang	Yang Na	Yang Na	Yang Na
Zhang Long	Zhao Shengkui	Zhao Shengkui	Zhao Shengkui
Zhao Hu	Bai Xiao	Bai Xiao	Bai Xiao
Wang Chao	Wang Yiwei	Wang Yiwei	Liu Jian
Ma Han	Zhang Peng	Zhang Peng	He Kai
Wang Yanling	Xiao Zhu	Xiao Zhu	Zhang Qi
Pang Ji	Yao Gang	Niu Piao	Niu Piao
Zhao Zhen	Liu Changde	Wang Hau	Wang Hau
Zhao Heng	Yang Lixin		Zhang Lei
Zhao Defang		Lung Lung	Lung Lung
Princess Di		Zhang Jiayi	Zhang Jiayi
Pang Fu		Xu Wen	Zhang Tianxiao

=== Other characters (in order of appearance) ===
Season 1 (2010)

- Jin Weifu as Bao Xing
- Wei Hua as Huli jing
- Li Guangfu as Zhang Biegu
- Zhang Wei as Lin Feng
- Xu Ming as Jiang Wan
- Guo Yiming as Pang Yu
- Zhang Jian as Xiang Fu
- Dong Weimin as Tian Zhong
- Ji Hai as Pang Shun
- Zhan Shibao as Pang An
- Benny Chan as Bai Yutang
- Miao Qing as Han Zhang
- Zhang Peng as Jiang Ping
- Wang Wenyan as Lu Fang
- Li Yonglin as Xu Qing
- Lin Yuezhang as Chen Lin
- Xie Yuanzhen as Suo'er
- Zhang Beibei as Hong Yujiao
- Zhou Zihan as Tian Rong
- Zhang Jiayi as Tian Rong's mother
- Li Peng as Wu Wen
- Zhong Yuping as Huaniang
- Zhang Liyong as Qu Ping
- Gao Jia as Gu Jun
- Wang Zhengquan as Fan Tong
- Chi Tao as Liu Yang
- Li Bing as Tie Jun
- Wang Jianjun as Xing Liang
- Wang Xiaobin as Peng Li
- Song Aiwu as Madame Wind
- Tan Jianchang as Chu Ge
- Wang Wenyan as Yuanhao
- Zhang Jian as Li Zhong
- He Zixiang as Qiu Xiong
- Liu Hongkun as Yu Changzhi
- Zhang Yan as Tu Qiang
- Jiang Chengpeng as Ding Qiang
- Li Jinming as Yuanchang
- Wang Wei as Zhu Ye
- Gu Changfu as Huo Gang
- Zhang Yuanrong as He Xin
- Chen Wei as Wei Dong
- Ren Xiaohan as Xiaocui
- Deng Ming as Wu Ming
- Gao Liang as Nangong Yuhui
- Zhang Xin as Ding Zhaolan
- Xu Ge as Ding Zhaohui
- Xu Ming as Chen Sheng
- Bi Haifeng as Tie Rong
- Fan Zhiling as Huniu
- Yao Hongming as Xiao Feng
- Xu Lin as Diao San
- Tian Luhan as Zhu'er
- Guo Zi as Tang Fei
- Wang Ke as Feng Hao
- Xu Zuming as Yao Wei
- Sun Qiang as Guo Liang
- Yan Xuejin as Ye Fang
- Chiang Hung-en as Ouyang Chun
- Liu Lei as Delin
- Cui Bo as Yuanzhen
- Mi Kaili as Leisha
- Xiang Yu as Fang Lie
- Liu Tao as Yang Mu
- Mao Linying as Wutong
- Gao Zhan as Nangong Quan
- Wang Huichun as Zhao Yi
- Jin Ming as Ding Yuehua
- He Zhonghua as Nangong Yuyao
- Liu Fangyu as Zhu Ying
- Xu Nannan as Yun'er
- Wang Yumei as Bao Mian's mother
- Liu Peiqi as Bao Mian

Season 2 (2011)

- He Zhonghua as Zhao Xiang
- Xu Nannan as Consort He
- Zhang Shen as Di Qing
- Cui Bo as Huiniang
- Wang Ke as Du Bin
- Xiang Yu as Du Ping
- Cai Die as Di Ting
- Bai En as Ling Yun
- Xie Yuanzhen as Yinxin
- Tian Luhan as Xique
- Zhang Yan as Luo Qiong
- Wang Xiaobin as Yu Meng
- Jin Yuquan as Xu Gu
- Deng Ming as Hong Chang
- Fan Zhiling as Yezi
- Liang Jinhua as Guizong
- Zhan Shibao as Ding Gui
- Wang Yao as Peng Qi
- Dong Weimin as Yuan Zhong
- Xu Ming as Zhou Yan
- Zhang Jian as Xiao Shi
- Liu Dian as Guo Xuan
- Fu Weifeng as Wen Qi
- Wang Wenyan as Xiao Wen
- Liu Weidong as Lu Di
- Zhou Chengqiang as Ba Shan
- Li Yonglin as Ba Hai
- Na Jiawei as Ji Lei
- Li Peng as Miao Jun
- Bi Yuanjin as Liu You
- Wang Wenhu as Tie Dan
- Zhan Shibao as Shi Bao
- Zhang Liyong as Ding Ren
- Shen Jian as Gu Feng
- Guo Zi as Guo Tao
- Li Jinming as Shi Hong
- Chi Tao as Zhu Quan

Season 3 (2012)

- Wang Qianyou as Luo Bei
- Cui Bo as Qi Ying
- She Nannan as Consort Dowager Zheng
- Yue Yueli as Murong Songlin
- Xie Yuanzhen as Baolin
- Huang Juan as Song Qiao'er
- He Zhonghua as Deng Ning
- Wang Yichan as Yu Ping
- Li Guangfu as Shi Jian
- Gao Liang as Gou Rong
- Liu Tao as Zheng Ning
- Xu Xiyan as Murong Ziyun
- Xu Ge as Feng Qi
- Bai En as Shangguan Wujiu
- Lin Jinfeng as Lei Ming
- Mao Yiwen as Lin Chuan
- Wang Zhengquan as Xu San
- Wang Ke as Prince Kang
- Li Xinran as Zhao Xiang
- Zhang Jian as Lang Yun
- Lou Yajiang as Bi Peng
- Zhu Minming as Deng Qiu
- Wang Renjun as Shi Yu
- Wang Wenyan as Zhou Dong
- Liu Dian as Guo Xuan
- Yao Zhuangfei as Liu Xu
- Huang Jing as Yu'er
- Wang Xiaobin as Gu Li
- Deng Ming as Zhu Quan
- Li Enqian as Shi Shi
- Chi Tao as Feng Wen
- Huang Gang as Shangguan Jing
- Gong Fangmin as Hong Tong
- Mei Xiaozheng as Sun Yuan
- Zhang Mengmeng as Ding Xiang
- Zhou Bin as Zhu Tong
- Wang Yong as Shi Dong
- Chen Xiuliang as Jiao Hai
- Zhan Shibao as Liu Quan
- Zhou Chengqiang as Hu Nan
- Tang Tingting as Yuxian
- Pan Yu as Zhang Hong
- Xu Li as Xu Qiang
- Lü Yang as ZHu Li
- Tian Siping as Lin Huan
- Ye Xinyu as Song Bing
- Xue Jingrui as Shan Xiong
- Li Yifeng as Su Feng
- Jia Kangxi as Su Yan
- Sun Hanwen as Doupi
- Zhang Liyong as Yu Ping
- Li Yonglin as Tie Niu
- Dong Qi as Xiu'er
- Zhang Yan as Wang Quan
- Wang Wenhu as Xiaosi
- Liu Weidong as Balin
- Zhang Lili as Cuifeng
- Chen Muyi as Huasheng
- Li Xinlu as Xiaobao
- Min Guohui as Yang Li
- Wang Xingyuan as Fake Shi Yu

== Theme songs ==
Type	Title	Singer	Lyricist	Composer
Opening song	"Qi Xia Wu Yi" (七俠五義; "The Seven Heroes and Five Gallants")	Shanghai Institute of Popular Music	Jin Yongjie	Chen Fuming
Ending song (Season 1)	"Sheng Sheng Man" (聲聲慢; "Slow, Slow Tune")	A-fu	Yang Chin-wei	Ho Kuan-ting
Insert songs (Season 1)	"Pianpian Feiqi" (翩翩飛起; "Fluttering Off")	Jeanette Wang	Ho Chi-hung; Chen Chia-li	Chen Fuming
Insert songs (Season 1)	"Ji Qian Renjia" (祭千人家; "Worshiping a Thousand Homes")	Zhou Xiang	Jin Yongjie	Zhou Xiang
Ending song (Season 2)	"Shuangyu Nüzi" (雙魚女子; "The Pisces Woman")	Shane Chang	A-Sun	Wang Yiping; Mao Hui
Ending song (Season 3)	"Zhide Bei Ni Chong" (值得被你寵; "Deserving Your Spoiling")	Winnie Hsin	Yao Je-lung	Guan Dazhou
