= Justice Bao (2008 TV series) =

Chinese television series

- DVD cover
- Also known as: New Justice Bao
- 包青天; Bāo Qīng Tiān
- Genre: crime fiction historical fiction wuxia gong'an fiction
- Written by: Jin Chao-chun
- Directed by: Liu Li-li; Li Baoneng
- Starring: Jin Chao-chun; Kenny Ho; Fan Hung-hsuan
- Opening theme: "Yì Bó Yún Tiān" (義薄雲天) performed by Samm Chan
- Ending theme: "Hǎo Xīn Yǒu Hǎo Bào" (好心有好報) performed by Yedda Chen & Samm Chan
- Composer: Liu Yuxiang
- Country of origin: China
- Original language: Mandarin
- No. of episodes: 61

Production
- Running time: 45 minutes/episode
- Production companies: Visionmax Entertainment; All-Connections International; CARFTE

Related
- Justice Bao (1993); Justice Bao (2010)

Justice Bao is a mainland Chinese television series, starring Jin Chao-chun, Kenny Ho and Fan Hung-hsuan. The three actors first portrayed their respective characters in the 1993 Taiwanese hit Justice Bao. Lung Lung from the 1993 series also reprised his role.

== Units ==
Unit	# of episodes	Chinese Title	English Translation
#1	12	打龍袍 (Dǎ Lóng Páo)	Beating the Dragon Robe
#2	12	白龍駒 (Bái Lóng Jū)	The "White Dragon" Horse
#3	11	通判劫 (Tōng Pàn Jié)	Robbing the Investigator
#4	13	黃金夢 (Huáng Jīn Mèng)	Dream of Gold
#5	13	鍘美案 (Zhá Mĕi Àn)	The Case of Executing Chen Shimei

== Cast ==
Note: Some cast members played multiple roles.

Cast	Role	Description
Jin Chao-chun	Bao Zheng	Prefect of Kaifeng, capital of Song dynasty
Kenny Ho	Zhan Zhao	4th ranked Royal Guard, also known as "Southern Hero"
Fan Hung-hsuan	Gongsun Ce	Bao Zheng's secretary
Ding Xiaolong	Wang Chao	Bao Zheng's senior constable
Gong Hongjia	Ma Han	Bao Zheng's senior constable
Gao Jingnan	Zhang Long	Bao Zheng's senior constable
Wu Hanruo	Zhao Hu	Bao Zheng's senior constable
Gao Liang	Zhao Zhen	"Emperor Renzong", 4th emperor of Song dynasty
Liu Jinquan	Wang Yanling	Song dynasty chancellor
Lung Lung	Zhao Defang	"Eighth Virtuous Prince", Emperor Renzong's uncle
Zhang Lei	Zhao Heng	"Emperor Zhenzong", Emperor Renzong's father and predecessor
Fu Yiwei	Empress; Dowager Liu	Emperor Zhenzong's wife
Gong Fangming	Guo Huai	Eunuch for Empress Dowager Liu
Wu Qianqian	Consort Li	Emperor Renzong's real mother
Xu Shouqin	Chen Lin	Former Chief Eunuch
Shen Yunzhou	Kou Zhu	Maid for Empress Liu
Tang Qirong	Qin Feng	Eunuch for "Cold Palace"
Song Jingchang	Pang Ji	Song dynasty's grand tutor, also the Emperor's father-in-law
Gao Zifang	Consort Pang	Pang Ji's daughter, married to Emperor Renzong
Lu Yang	Pang Yu	Pang Ji's son and also the Marquis of Peace
Zhang Xi	Lu Fang	"Sky Rat", 1st sworn brother
Bi Hanwen	Han Zhang	"Earth Rat", 2nd sworn brother
Shi Lei	Xu Qing	"Mountain Rat", 3rd sworn brother
Bi He'nan	Jiang Ping	"River Rat", 4th sworn brother
Michael Tong	Bai Yutang	"Sleek Rat", 5th sworn brother
Gao Zhan	Ouyang Chun	"Northern Hero"
Jiang Hua	Princess Leping	Emperor Renzong's younger sister
Wang Hao	Chen Shimei	Champion Scholar, married to Emperor Renzong's sister and becoming Prince Consort
Cheng Yong	Han Qi	Chen Shimei's guard
Chen Ting	Qin Xianglian	Chen Shimei's original wife

== International broadcast ==
Network(s)/Station(s)	Series premiere		Title
Thailand	Channel 3 (33)	September 4, 2008 - March 11, 2009 (Every Monday to Friday from 18.00 - 19.00)	เปาบุ้นจิ้น เทพแห่งยุติธรรม ( ; lit: )
Thailand	Thairath TV (32)	S 00, 2015 - M 00, 2015, - (Every Monday to Friday from 18.00 - 19.00)	เปาบุ้นจิ้น ตำนานศาลไคฟง ( ; lit: )
Thailand	Channel 9 MCOT HD (30)	May 4, 2020 – July 1, 2020, September 2, 2020 - January 1, 2021 (Every Monday to Thursday from 18.00 - 19.00) (Wednesday, November 18, 2020; No Broadcasting) (Wednesday, December 18, 2020; No Broadcasting); January 4, 2021 - February 26, 2021 (Every Monday to Friday from 18.00 - 19.00)	เปาบุ้นจิ้น ( ; lit: )
