= Lu Fang (character) =

Lu Fang (盧方)
- Wuxia character
- From an 1890 print of the novel published by Guangbaisongzhai, collection of Fudan University
- Created by: Shi Yukun

In-universe information
- Alias: Zhang Da (張大)
- Nicknames: Sky Rat or Sky-Penetrating Rat (鑽天鼠); Mast Rat (盤桅鼠)
- Children: Lu Zhen (盧珍), son
- Home: Songjiang (likely in Xiu Prefecture, Liangzhe Circuit)

Lu Fang
- Traditional Chinese: 盧方
- Simplified Chinese: 卢方
Transcriptions
Standard Mandarin
- Hanyu Pinyin: Lú Fāng
Yue: Cantonese
- Jyutping: Lou^{4} Fong^{1}

Lu Fang is a fictional Song dynasty hero from the 19th-century Chinese novels The Seven Heroes and Five Gallants and The Five Younger Gallants. He is nicknamed "Sky Rat" or "Sky-Penetrating Rat" (鑽天鼠) for his mast-climbing skills.

Lu Fang owns an estate on Hollow Island (陷空島), where he and his younger sworn brothers Han Zhang, Xu Qing, Jiang Ping, and Bai Yutang — collectively known as the "Five Rats" — are based. As their leader, Lu Fang is magnanimous, respectful, patriotic and heroic. He is also very protective over his sworn brothers, especially Bai Yutang, and can come off as sentimental or nagging at times. Lu Fang eventually becomes a Rank 6 Commandant (校尉) under Judge Bao.

== Background ==
Lu Fang's father had been a rich but generous squire on Hollow Island, whose estate Lu Fang inherited. Hollow Island is located in the middle of the Song River (松江, possibly today's Suzhou Creek in Shanghai), where his men catch fish. Once, when a boat's halyard broke, Lu Fang quickly climbed up the mast and knotted the loose ends together, earning himself the nickname "Sky Rat". Lu Fang is able to rapidly move up a pole "like a monkey" and like an acrobat, balance himself on the pole with only one arm or one leg around it.

Lu Fang is described as tall and sturdy, with a swarthy complexion, a long lush beard, and a deep voice. At some point, he became sworn brothers with Han Zhang, Xu Qing, Jiang Ping and Bai Yutang who all joined him on his island. Lu Fang has a wife and a son named Lu Zhen (盧珍), who is only a few years younger than Bai Yutang.

Hollow Island is separated from the neighboring Jasmine Village (茉花村) by Reed Catkins Cove (蘆花蕩), which form the boundary of their respective fishing areas. Jasmine Village is home to the heroes Ding Zhaolan, Ding Zhaohui and Ding Yuehua, as well as hundreds of fishermen. Lu Fang first appears in the novel when he arrives in Jasmine Village to apologize over a recent scuffle caused by his new recruit named Deng Biao (鄧彪), who has crossed the border and made a scene, injuring a fisherman and stealing several fishing nets. Lu Fang immediately returns the fishing nets and punishes Deng Biao by delivering him to the government yamen. His actions impress Zhan Zhao, who is visiting Jasmine Village.

== Stories ==
=== Rescuing a girl ===
After Bai Yutang leaves for the capital Kaifeng, apparently to challenge Zhan Zhao, Lu Fang becomes very worried. First, he dispatches Han Zhang, Xu Qing and Jiang Ping to find him and get him back. After some time he also sets off for Kaifeng, dressed like an ex-soldier. One day, arriving just outside Kaifeng where a temple fair is going on, he sees several thugs trying to drag away a screaming girl. He immediately stops them and asks what is going on. The thugs are working for a lustful bully named Yan Qi (嚴奇), who, noticing Lu Fang's genteel demeanor and non-local accent, thinks he can be easily intimidated. Instead, Lu Fang sends him and several thugs tumbling to the ground. When one thug tries to strike him with a staff, Lu Fang dodges the blow, which accidentally kills Yan Qi. Judge Bao's officers Wang Chao and Ma Han then arrive to take Lu Fang and the thug to the yamen. At first, Lu Fang gives his name as Zhang Da (張大), but he is recognized by Zhan Zhao, who has seen him in Jasmine Village. Once Yan Qi's murder is cleared up, Lu Fang meets Judge Bao and Gongsun Ce, who treat him like an honored guest. In return, Lu Fang promises to help them find Bai Yutang — who has by this time committed several crimes — and bring him to justice.

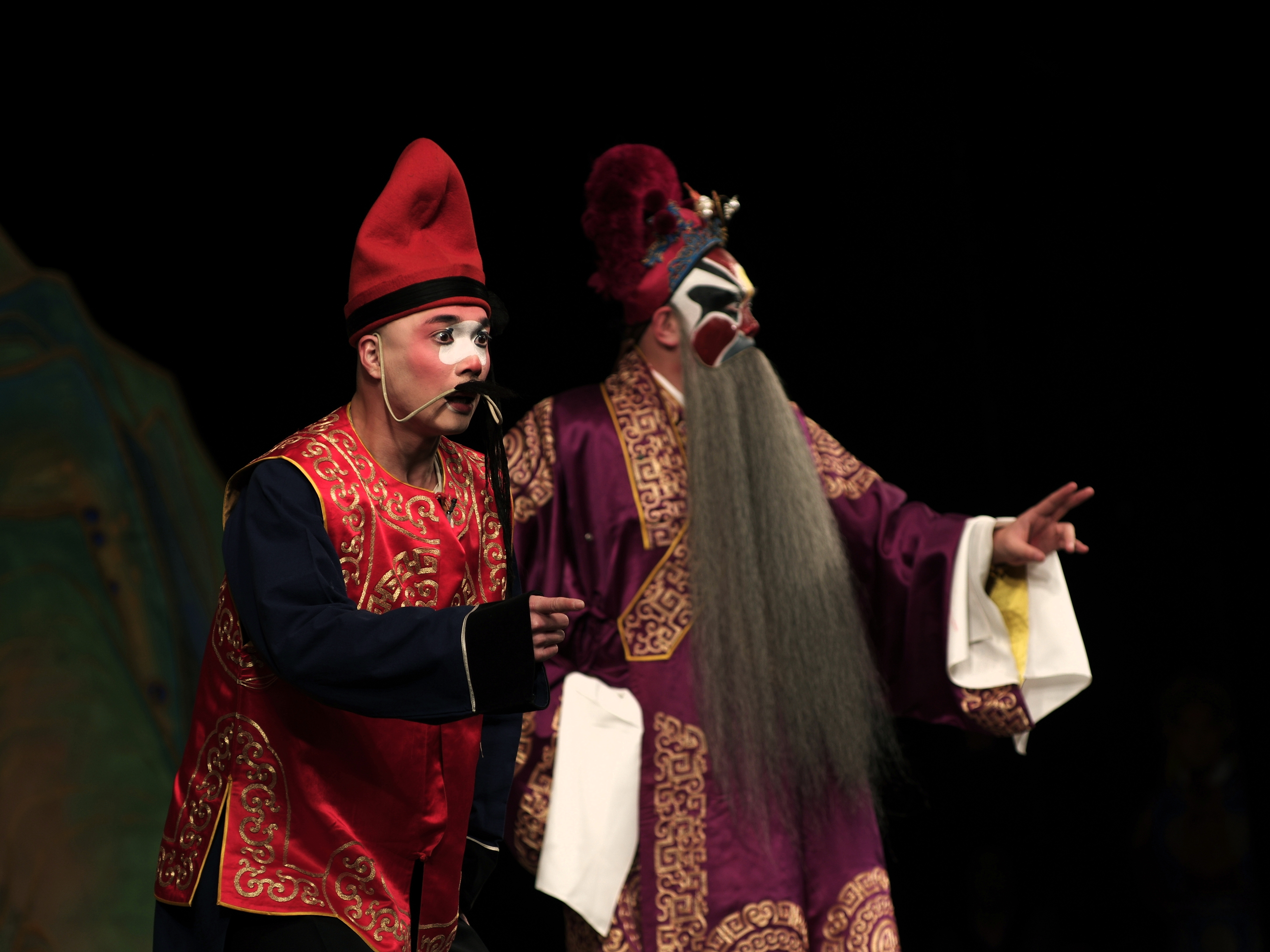
Lu Fang (right) learns about Bai Yutang's tragic death from Mao Gaga (毛嘎嘎). From a Peking opera performance in Tianchan Theatre, Shanghai, 20 December 2014.

== Portrayal in film and television ==
- Yang Chih-ching in King Cat (1967)
- Tso You in Justice Pao (1974–75)
- Cheung Chin-pang in Cat vs Rat (1982)
- Chu Ko in House of Traps (1982)
- Chang Kuo-chu in Justice Pao (1993–94)
- Shut Chung-tin in The Invincible Constable (1993)
- Lin Tsai-pei in The Seven Heroes and Five Gallants (1994)
- Wang Quanyou in The New Seven Heroes and Five Gallants (1994)
- Xie Jiaqi in Cat and Mouse (2003)
- Gao Zhan in A Game of Cat and Mouse (2005)
- Zhang Xin in Bai Yutang (2005) and Justice Bao (2008)
- Wang Wenyan in Justice Bao: The Seven Heroes and Five Gallants (2010)
- Liu Weihua in Invincible Knights Errant (2011)
- Shang Daqing in Sleek Rat, the Challenger (2013)
- He Yu in The Three Heroes and Five Gallants (upcoming)
