= Little Zhuge =

"Little Zhuge" (小諸葛), short for "Little Zhuge Liang", is a Chinese nickname used for individuals who are perceived to be highly intelligent, especially militarily. The nickname could refer to:

- Bai Chongxi (1893–1966), Chinese general and politician of the Kuomintang
- Shen Zhongyuan, a fictional character in the novel The Seven Heroes and Five Gallants
