= Jing, the Thirteenth =

Jing, the Thirteenth (fl. 880), was a Chinese businesswoman.

Jing was described as a rich widow and businesswoman, though her business is not specified. She lived in Yangzhou close to Nanjing. She was known for her charitable nature and her wish to do good and intervene in the cause of justice, and was therefore regarded in history as a nüxia or female justice fighter.

She lived with her lover, the student Zhao Zhongxing, who, though wasteful with her fortune, shared her justice ideals. She is best known for the story in which she helped a friend of her lover, Li, to elope with a courtesan who had been forced to marry a corrupt man by the name Zhuge Yin.

Her story was portrayed in fiction for centuries.
