= Cat and Mouse (2003 film) =

2003 Hong Kong film by Gordon Chan

- Film poster
- 老鼠愛上貓
- Directed by: Gordon Chan
- Written by: Felix Chong; Gordon Chan
- Based on: The Seven Heroes and Five Gallants by Shi Yukun
- Produced by: Andrew Lau; Han Zhijun; Zhou You
- Starring: Andy Lau; Cecilia Cheung; Anthony Wong; Li Bingbing
- Cinematography: Andrew Lau; Ko Chiu-Lam
- Edited by: Danny Pang; Curran Pang
- Music by: Ken Chan; Chan Kwong-Wing
- Production companies: Media Asia Films; Changchun Film Group; Basic Pictures; China Film Co-Production Corporation; Eastern Dragon Film Company
- Distributed by: Media Asia Distribution
- Release date: 13 February 2003
- Running time: 92 minutes
- Country: Hong Kong
- Language: Cantonese
- Box office: HK$12,800,000

Cat and Mouse (老鼠愛上貓) is a 2003 Hong Kong wuxia romantic comedy film directed by Gordon Chan, and starring Andy Lau, Anthony Wong and Cecilia Cheung. The film is loosely based on the 19th century novel The Seven Heroes and Five Gallants by Shi Yukun.

== Plot ==
Zhan Zhao (Andy Lau) is a court officer who learns of a plot to assassinate Judge Bao (Anthony Wong). While on holiday he meets a young woman named Bai (Cecilia Cheung) who turns out to be a woman. Zhan Zhao tries to recruit Bai to help him stop the assassination of Judge Bao.

== Cast ==
Cast	Role	Description
Andy Lau	Zhan Zhao	"Southern Hero"
Anthony Wong	Bao Zheng	Prefect of Kaifeng, capital of Song dynasty
Cecilia Cheung	Bai Yutang	"Brocade-Coated Mouse", 5th sworn "brother"
Xie Jiaqi	Lu Fang	"Sky-Penetrating Mouse", 1st sworn brother
Chapman To	Han Zhang	"Earth-Piercing Mouse", 2nd sworn brother
Lam Chi-chung	Xu Qing	"Mountain-Boring Mouse", 3rd sworn brother
Cheung Ho-lung	Jiang Ping	"River-Overturning Mouse", 4th sworn brother
Guo Donglin	Zhao Jue	"Prince of Xiangyang"
Li Bingbing	Yuehua	Prince of Xiangyang's sworn sister
Cheung Tat-ming	Zhao Zhen	"Emperor Renzong", 4th emperor of Song dynasty
Ma Qianshan	Empress Pang	married to Emperor Renzong
Ma Zijun	Pang Ji	Song dynasty grand tutor, Empress Pang's father
Wu Yue	Pang Yu	Grand Tutor Pang's son
Miao Haizhong	Gongsun Ce	Bao Zheng's secretary
Wen Yang	Wang Chao	Bao Zheng's officer
Gao Lei	Ma Han	Bao Zheng's officer
Jonathan Cheung	Zhang Long	Bao Zheng's officer
Cui Lin	Zhao Hu	Bao Zheng's officer
Jiang Guoyin	Chen Lin	eunuch
Guan Shuntian	Guo An	eunuch

== Theme Song ==
- Song: Justice Bao (包青天)
  - Singer: Andy Lau
  - Composer: Yang Bing Zhong
  - Lyricist: Sun Yi
  - Arranger: Jacky Chan and Marco Wan
