= The Five Younger Gallants =

- Cover of The Five Younger Gallants from the National Library of China
- Author: unknown, allegedly Shi Yukun
- Original title: The Five Younger Gallants
- Traditional Chinese: 小五義
- Simplified Chinese: 小五义
- Hanyu Pinyin: Xiǎo Wǔ Yì
- Jyutping: Siu^{2} Ng^{5} Ji^{6}
- Language: Written Chinese
- Genre: Wuxia fiction
- Set in: 11th century (Song dynasty)
- Published: 1890
- Publisher: Wenguang lou (Beijing)
- Publication place: Qing dynasty
- Media type: Print
- Preceded by: The Tale of Loyal Heroes and Righteous Gallants (1879)
- Followed by: A Sequel to the Five Younger Gallants (1891)

The Five Younger Gallants (小五義) is an 1890 Chinese novel and the best known sequel to the hugely popular 1879 novel The Tale of Loyal Heroes and Righteous Gallants (republished as The Seven Heroes and Five Gallants in 1889). It is followed a year later by Sequel to the Five Younger Gallants (續小五義). Both sequels were published by Shi Duo (石鐸) who owned the Beijing publisher Wenguang lou (文光樓). The editor was a "Captivated-Wind Daoist" (風迷道人). It is unknown whether he was the same person as "Captivated Daoist" (入迷道人), an editor of the 1879 novel.

All three novels claim authorship by the famed storyteller Shi Yukun. During the last decade of the 19th century, the first sequel was reprinted 9 times, 7 in Shanghai and 1 each in Beijing and Chongqing.

== Authorship controversy ==
Cover of Sequel to the Five Younger Gallants (續小五義)

While scholars generally agree that Shi Yukun was the genius behind the original novel (even though he most likely died before 1879), how much he contributed to The Five Younger Gallants and its sequel if at all, is unknown. The 1879 novel (which was published by another Beijing publisher, the Juzhen Tang) does not complete its tale by the final chapter, and readers are told to wait for The Five Younger Gallants. However, none of the "previewed" plotlines at the end of the original was found in the sequel. The editors did not deny that the two novels had different origins: According to Shi Duo's preface, his unnamed friend who was an acquaintance with an unnamed disciple of Shi Yukun brought him the original draft by Shi Yukun, with "over three hundred chapters, was bound in seventy or eighty volumes, contained over three thousand episodes in three major parts", which he acquired "without begrudging the great cost". "Captivated-Wind Daoist" in his preface hinted that the 1879 novel was not authentic as it was noticeably different from the "original draft" he received.

In A Brief History of Chinese Fiction, Lu Xun wrote (as translated by Yang Hsien-yi and Gladys Yang):

[T]he style of the first sequel is greatly inferior to that of the original work though the second sequel is somewhat better. It seems likely that both sequels might be by the same author but edited by different hands, resulting in this discrepancy in style.

One of the prefaces, dated "the first month of winter of 1890", suggestively includes the name Boyin (伯寅), Pan Zuyin's courtesy name, but as Pan died on December 11, 1890, it was unlikely his work.

== The Five Younger Gallants ==
- Ai Hu (艾虎), nicknamed "Little Hero". He is actually a main character in the later chapters of the original.
- Lu Zhen (盧珍), Lu Fang's son, nicknamed "Powder-Faced Zidu" (粉面子都). He appears briefly in the original.
- Han Tianjin (韓天錦), Han Zhang's adopted son, nicknamed "Thunderbolt Devil" (霹靂鬼).
- Xu Liang (徐良), Xu Qing's son, nicknamed "Goose from Shanxi" (山西雁) and "White Eyebrows" (白眉毛).
- Bai Yunsheng (白芸生), Bai Yutang's nephew, nicknamed "Jade-Faced Zhuan Zhu" (玉面專諸).

== Film and TV adaptations ==
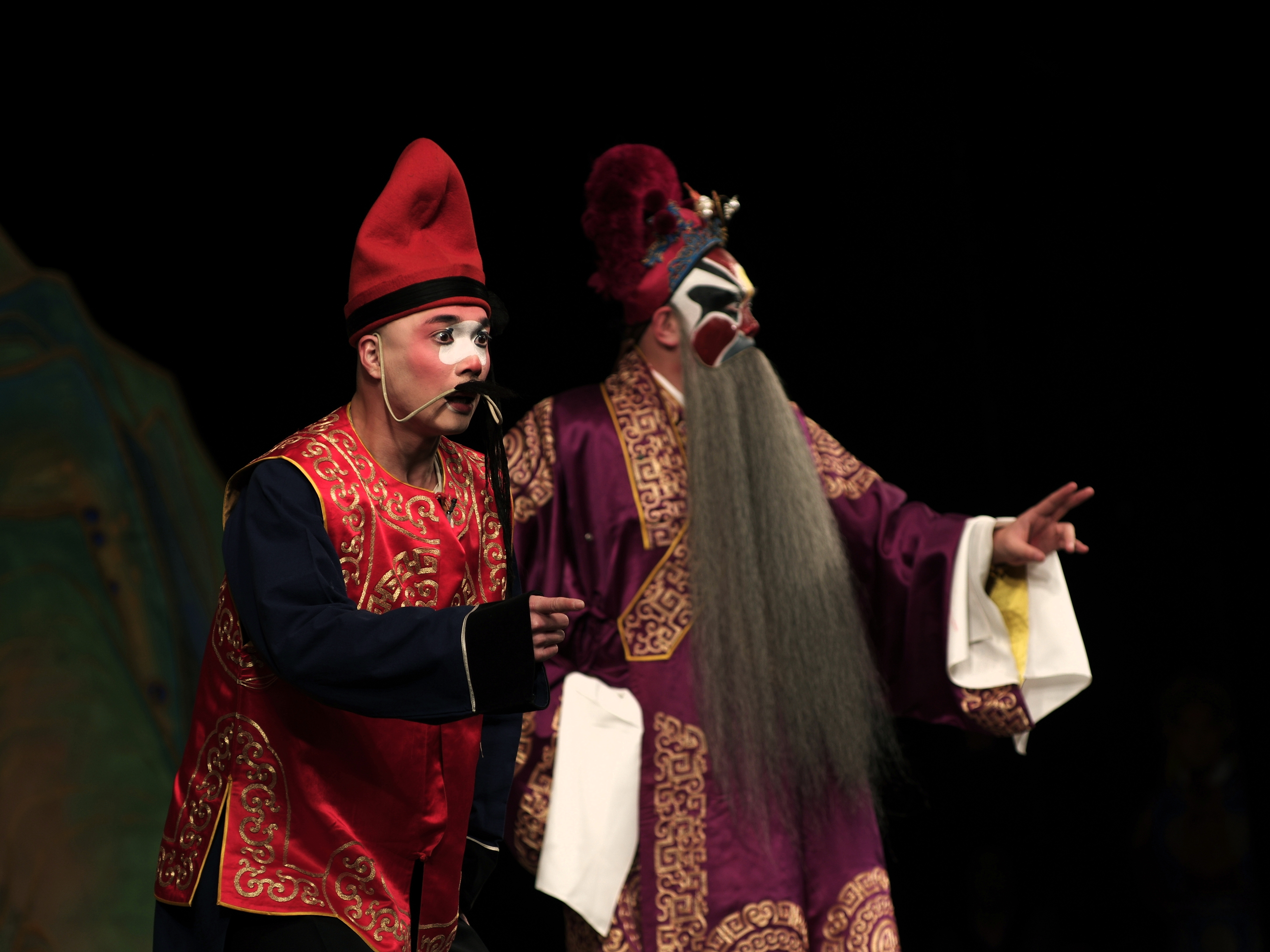
Peking opera actors enact a scene from Ch. 9: Mao Gaga (毛嘎嘎, left) accidentally tells Lu Fang about Bai Yutang's tragic death. From a performance in Tianchan Theatre, Shanghai, 20 December 2014.

=== Film ===
- Breaking Through the Bronze Net (大破銅網陣), a 1939 Hong Kong film.
- Triple Flirtation of the White Chrysanthemum (三戲白菊花), a 1939 Hong Kong film.
- The Five Swordsmen's Nocturnal Tryst (小五義夜探沖霄樓), a 1940 Hong Kong film.
- The Junior Hero Ngai Fu (小俠艾虎), a 1949 Hong Kong film.
- Solving the Copper-Netted Trap (大破銅網陣), a 1950 Hong Kong film.
- The Three Battles Between White Eye-Brows and White Chrysanthemum (白眉毛三戰白菊花), a 1950 Hong Kong film.
- Five Little Heroes (小五義), a 1951 Hong Kong film.
- Shattering the Copper Net Array (大破銅網陣), a 1959 Hong Kong film.
- The Magnificent Five (小五義大破銅網陣), a 1968 Hong Kong film.
- Flying Thief, White Flower (飛賊白菊花), a 1969 Hong Kong film.

In addition, Bai Yunsheng appears in the 1970 Hong Kong film The Winged Tiger.

=== TV ===
- The Five Younger Gallants (小五義), a 1977 Hong Kong TV series.
- The Five Tiger Generals (五虎將), a 1980 Taiwanese TV series.
- The Magnificent Five (新小五義), a 1987 Hong Kong TV series.
- The White-Eyebrowed Hero (白眉大俠), a 1994 Chinese TV series.
- Chinese Folk Tales (中國民間故事), a 1996 Taiwanese TV series, Episode "Ai Hu Solicits a Bride" (艾虎招親).
