= Shan Tianfang =

Chinese actor

- Born: Shan Chuanzhong (单传忠); 17 December 1934; Xishi District, Yingkou, Manchukuo
- Died: 11 September 2018 (aged 83); Beijing, China
- Occupation: Pingshu performer
- Spouse: Wang Quangui (王全桂)

Shan Chuanzhong (Chinese: 单传忠; pinyin: Shàn Chuánzhōng; 17 December 1934 – 11 September 2018), better known by stage name Shan Tianfang (Chinese: 单田芳; pinyin: Shàn Tiánfāng), was a Chinese pingshu performer. He was a member of the third batch of national intangible cultural heritage inheritors, a member of Chinese Ballad Singers Association and a member of China Society for Literature Popular Research. His language in pingshu performances was relatively plain, and he specialized in presenting the images, colors and emotions with sound impressions. Since the mid-1990s, his storytelling video shows have been broadcast on TV stations like CCTV.

== Pingshu career ==
=== Early years ===
In the 1950s, Shan's father was wrongly put into prison, thus his mother divorced his father. In 1953, he was accepted into Northeast Institute of Technology. Subsequently, however due to his physical condition and family problems, he gave up his studies and turned to perform pingshu, as an apprentice of Li Qinghai (Chinese 李庆海). In 1955, Shan entered the Anshan Quyi Tuan, where he was instructed by Zhao Yufeng (Chinese: 赵玉峰), a famous Xihe Dagu performer, and Yang Tianrong (Chinese: 杨田荣), a famous pingshu performer. At 24, Shan officially went on stage. He performed not only traditional pingshu, but new works as well.

=== During the Cultural Revolution ===
During the Cultural Revolution, Shan was persecuted for some comments he had made, and once he even got his teeth kicked by mobs.

=== Return to the stage ===
After the Cultural Revolution ended, Shan was able of returning to the stage to perform pingshu. He started from the Anshan Radio Broadcast Station. Gradually, he was received by the pingshu fans across the country and became one of the best experts in storytelling.

=== Later life ===
After his retirement, Shan continued to develop his pingshu career and established Beijing Shan Tianfang Culture and Art Dissemination Co., Ltd., of which he was the chairman of the board.

On 11 September 2018, 3:30 pm, Shan died at the China-Japan Friendship Hospital because of illness.

== Brief introduction to his works ==
- Lin Zexu (林则徐), an 80-episode flash pingshu, tells the story of Lin Zexu, who, during the reign of the Daoguang Emperor in the Qing dynasty, launched an opium suppression campaign as an imperial commissioner in Guangzhou, and of what happened after his dismissal.
- The White-Eyebrow Hero (白眉大侠), a sequel to the classical story The Seven Heroes and Five Gallants and its sequel The Five Younger Gallants, set in the Northern Song dynasty, tells the story of a group of heroes who fight for righteousness under the leadership of Xu Liang (a.k.a. the White_Eyebrow Hero). They seek to remove oppressors and battle injustice. The story was later made into a TV series under the same title.

Tianfang's other works include The Romance of Sui and Tang Dynasty, Xue Jia Jiang (literally Generals of the Xue Family), Three Heroes and Three Swordsmen, Heroes in a Troubled Time (The Legend of Zhang Zuolin and his son Zhang Xueliang), Xue Gang Rebels Against the Tang Dynasty, Sanxia Wuyi (literally The Seven Heroes and Five Gallants, Wuxia) and The Biography of Tong Lin. He was sued by the children of Gong Baiyu for copyright infringement after using the plot of the author's 1938 wuxia novel 十二金钱镖 in a radio story broadcast.

== Influences ==
"Where there is a drinking well, there are (people) listening to Shan Tianfang." Throughout the art career, he had a collection of over 100 works, which have been broadcast on 500 radio and TV stations and have influenced several generations in China. Tianfang had stellar reputation and a unique voice and thus is oft imitated.

== Family ==
Shan Tianfang originated from a family of quyi. His grandfather, Wang Fuyi (Chinese: 王福义), was one of the earliest old artists who, performing bamboo clapper tale, went to Shenyang during the period of Chuang Guandong (literally "crashing into Guandong"). His mother, Wang Xianggui (Chinese: 王香桂), whose stage name was Bai Yatou (literally "the pale girl"), was a famous performer of Xihe Dagu in the 1930s and 1940s. His father, Shan Yongkui (Chinese:单永魁), was an artist of string instrument. His oldest uncle Shan Yongsheng (Chinese:单永生) and third younger uncle Shan Yonghuai (Chinese:单永槐) were respectively Xihe Dagu performers and storytellers. His widow, Wang Quangui (Chinese:王全桂), is eight years older than he was.
