= Gong Baiyu =

Republican-era Chinese martial arts novelist

Gong Baiyu (Chinese: 宮白羽; September 9, 1899 - 1 March 1966) was a Chinese novelist of the Republican period, an early exponent of the martial arts (wuxia) genre that rose to new heights of popularity with the next generation of writers, such as Jin Yong and Liang Yusheng, both of whom cited him as a great influence. His career was cut short, however, with the banning of the genre by the Communist Party following their seizure of power in mainland China in 1949.

== Biography ==
=== Early life ===
Gong Baiyu was born Gong Wanxuan (万选) in Qing County, Hebei Province, during the final years of the Qing dynasty. His father was a battalion commander (管带) in the New Armies. He attended school in Tianjin and began to write stories in his teen years. Starting in July 1921, he maintained correspondence with the highly influential novelist and translator Lu Xun, who regularly lent him books, including works of European literature he had translated into Chinese. It wasn't until 1938 that he finally adopted Baiyu as his pen name for the martial arts stories, a genre that was not viewed as being quite so respectable and had faced occasional sanctions by the government.

=== Career ===
His first martial arts novel, Twelve Money Darts (十二金钱镖), was published serially in the newspaper Yong Bao (庸报) from February 1938, eventually being released in book form in four volumes. Set in the years around the time of the fall of the Ming dynasty and the rise of the Qing, it was his most highly praised story and served as the first volume of a trilogy and was followed by 血涤寒光剑, from 1941, and 毒砂掌 in 1947. 武林争雄记 began its serialized run in the final month of 1939, which was followed up in 1942 with 牧野雄风. 偷拳 is considered his most important work. A 20 chapter edition was published in Tianjin in 1940, and then reissued with 22 chapters in 1947 in Shanghai. It deals with the life of the founder of Yang style taiji, Yang Luchan.

Later Years and Influence

Following the Communist victory in the Chinese Civil War in 1949, the wuxia genre in which Gong Baiyu made his name was banned in the Mainland. Authors in Hong Kong and Taiwan carried on the tradition and claimed to find influence in his legacy. Liang Yusheng, one of the three major novelists in the martial arts literature of the post-1949 generation, chose the yu (羽) in his nom de plume in homage to Gong Baiyu.

In his final years, he suffered from emphysema. A blood clot in his brain slowed down his research into historical Chinese writing (oracle bone and Chinese bronze inscriptions), which by the 1950s filled up much of his time. His hopes to publish his collected writings on this topic before his death were not to be realized. Gong Baiyu died in 1966.

In 2002, two of his children, Gong Yiren and Gong Zhiyu, won a lawsuit against popular folk artist and raconteur Shan Tianfang for copyright infringement over his use of the plot of the 1938 novel 十二金钱镖 in a radio story broadcast.
