= Han Zhang =

Han Zhang (韓彰)
- Wuxia character
- From an 1890 print of the novel published by Guangbaisongzhai, collection of Fudan University
- Created by: Shi Yukun

In-universe information
- Nickname: Earth Rat or Earth-Piercing Rat (徹地鼠)
- Home: Huang Prefecture, Huainan West Circuit

Han Zhang
- Traditional Chinese: 韓彰
- Simplified Chinese: 韩彰
Transcriptions
Standard Mandarin
- Hanyu Pinyin: Hán Zhāng
Yue: Cantonese
- Jyutping: Hon^{4} Zoeng^{1}

Han Zhang is a fictional Song dynasty knight-errant from the 19th-century Chinese novels The Seven Heroes and Five Gallants and The Five Younger Gallants. Nicknamed "Earth Rat" or "Earth-Piercing Rat" (徹地鼠) for his expertise in land mines, he has a military background.

Han Zhang, along with sworn brothers Lu Fang, Xu Qing, Jiang Ping and Bai Yutang are known as the "Five Rats". Han is ranked second in age, and probably is the second best fighter after Bai Yutang, because he not only carries a broadsword but also poisonous darts. Relatively introverted, Han prefers to act alone and is the last of the "Five Rats" to surrender to the government.

== Portrayal in film and television ==
- Ku Wen-chung in King Cat (1967)
- Chiang Nan in Justice Pao (1974–75)
- Ching Chu in Cat vs Rat (1982)
- Yu Tai-ping in House of Traps (1982)
- Wu Yuan-chun in Justice Pao (1993–94)
- Mark Cheng in The Invincible Constable (1993)
- Yu An-shun in The Seven Heroes and Five Gallants (1994)
- Zhang Hui in The New Seven Heroes and Five Gallants (1994)
- Gao Yang in The Young Detective (2000)
- Chapman To in Cat and Mouse (2003)
- Liu Weidong in A Game of Cat and Mouse (2005)
- Wu Shiqiang in Bai Yutang (2005)
- Bi Hanwen in Justice Bao (2008)
- Miao Qing in Justice Bao: The Seven Heroes and Five Gallants (2010)
- Chen Chuhan in Invincible Knights Errant (2011)
- Zhang Shuping in Sleek Rat, the Challenger (2013)
- Wang Daqi in The Three Heroes and Five Gallants (upcoming)
