= Huang Prefecture =

Historical administrative division of China

- Traditional Chinese: 黃州
- Simplified Chinese: 黄州
Transcriptions
Standard Mandarin
- Hanyu Pinyin: Huáng Zhōu
- Wade–Giles: Huang^{2} Chou^{1}

Huangzhou or Huang Prefecture was a zhou (prefecture) in imperial China, centering on modern Huangzhou District, Huanggang, Hubei, China. It existed (intermittently) from 585 until 1279.

The modern district, created in 1996 (although it also existed between 1984 and 1987 under the administration of Ezhou), retains its name.

== Geography ==
The administrative region of Huang Prefecture in the Tang dynasty was in modern eastern Hubei. It probably includes parts of modern:

- Under the administration of Huanggang:
  - Huangzhou District
- Under the administration of Wuhan:
  - Xinzhou District

== See also ==
- Yong'an Commandery
- Huangzhou Route
- Huangzhou Prefecture
