= Zidishu =

Chinese folk ballad

Zidishu (simplified Chinese: 子弟书; traditional Chinese: 子弟書; pinyin: Zǐdì shū), translated as Bannerman Song or Scion Book, was a popular Chinese folk ballad song during the Qing dynasty (1644–1912), mostly composed and performed by Manchu people. It flourished between 1736 and 1850 and began to decline at the end of the 19th century. In the 18th century, it was considered one of the most elegant popular northern, Beijing-based Chinese songs.
