= Tianchan Theatre =

Theatre in Shanghai, China

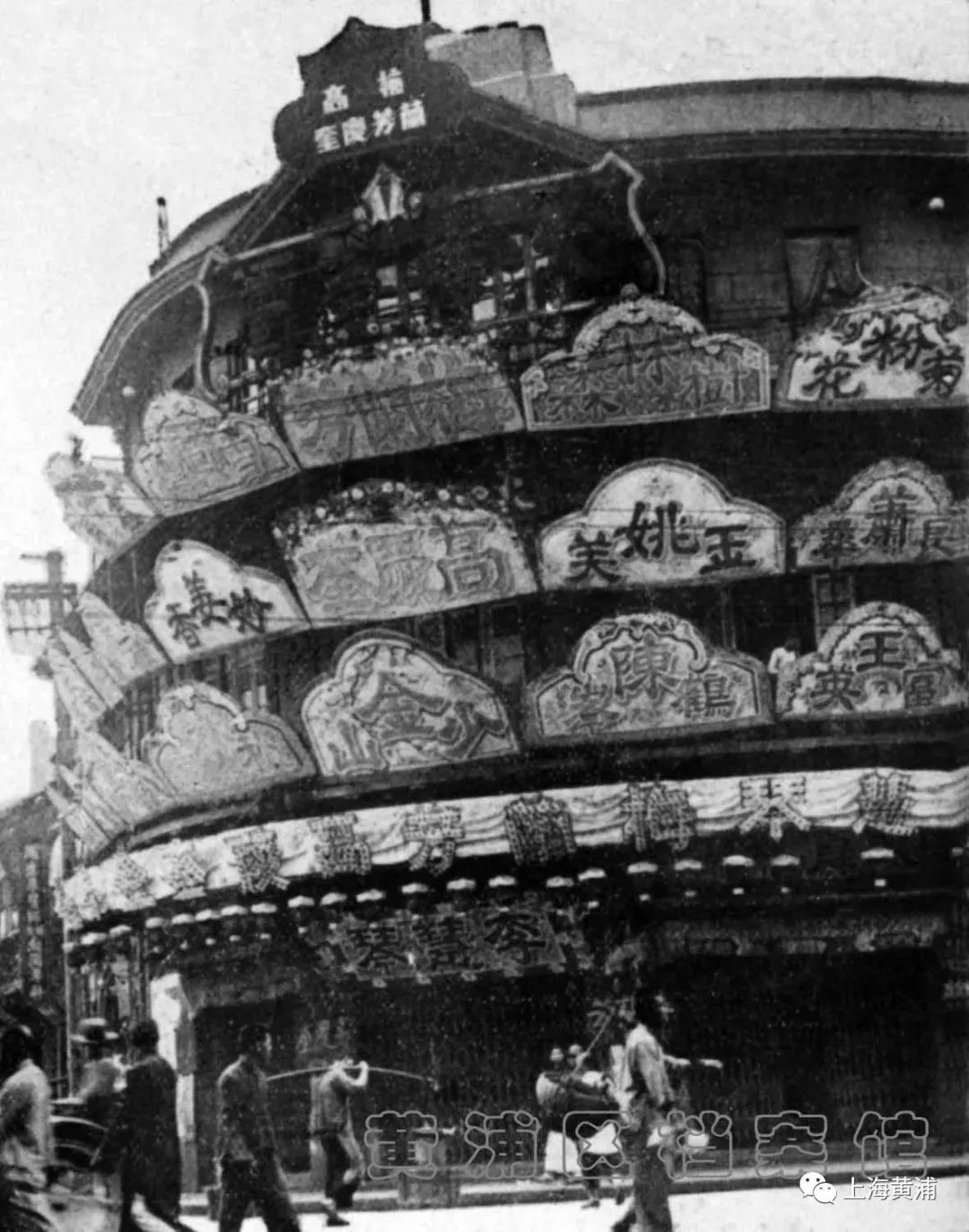
Tianchan Theater circa 1930

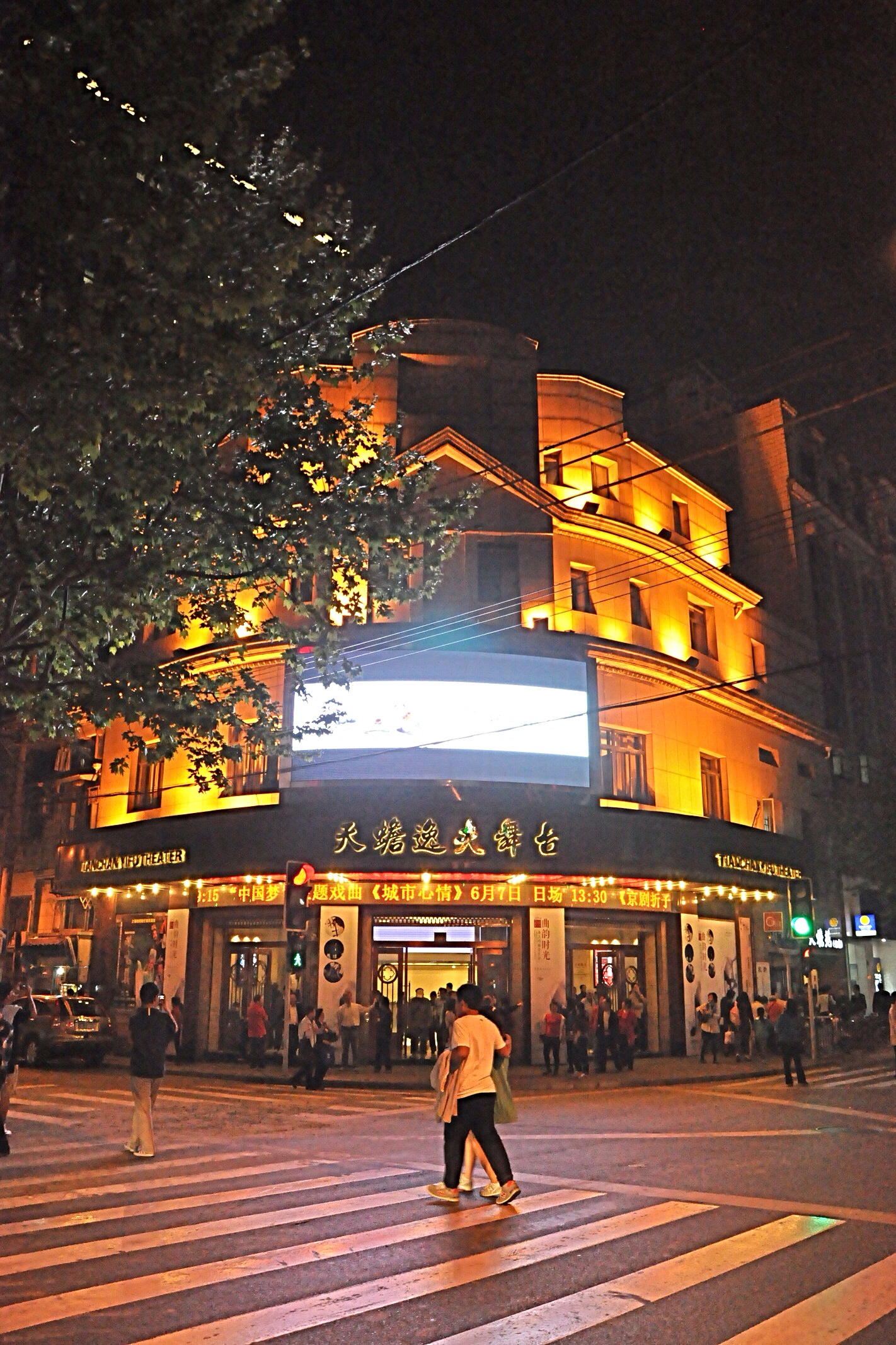
Tianchan Theater in 2014

The Tianchan Peking Opera Center and Yifu Theater (traditional Chinese: 天蟾京劇中心逸夫舞臺; simplified Chinese: 天蟾京剧中心逸夫舞台), commonly known as Tianchan Yifu Theater, or just Tianchan, Yifu, or Tianchan Theater, is a theater in Shanghai, China. Built in 1925, it opened on the Chinese New Year of 1926 as the Tahsin Theater(Chinese: 大新舞臺), and was subsequently taken over by the tycoon Ku Chu-hsuan (Chinese: 顧竹軒) in 1930, who renamed as "Tianchan."

Most performances there are Peking Operas, with occasional Yue opera (also known as "Shaohsing opera") or Kunqu performances.
