= Jiang Ping (character) =

Jiang Ping (蔣平)
- Wuxia character
- From an 1896 print of The Five Younger Gallants
- Created by: Shi Yukun

In-universe information
- Aliases: Priest Zhang (張道士); Old Gan (甘老兒)
- Nicknames: River Rat or River-Overturning Rat (翻江鼠); The Patient (病夫)
- Home: Jinling, Jiangnan East Circuit

Jiang Ping
- Traditional Chinese: 蔣平
- Simplified Chinese: 蒋平
Transcriptions
Standard Mandarin
- Hanyu Pinyin: Jiǎng Píng

Jiang Zechang
- Traditional Chinese: 蔣泽長
- Simplified Chinese: 蒋泽长
Transcriptions
Standard Mandarin
- Hanyu Pinyin: Jiǎng Zécháng

Jiang Ping, courtesy name Zechang, is a fictional Song dynasty knight-errant from the 19th-century Chinese novels The Seven Heroes and Five Gallants and The Five Younger Gallants. Nicknamed "River Rat" or "River-Overturning Rat" (翻江鼠) for his amazing swimming and freediving skills, he is able to stay underwater seemingly forever. He is the fourth sworn brother of the "Five Rats", whose other members are Lu Fang, Han Zhang, Xu Qing and Bai Yutang.

Highly witty, Jiang Ping is one of the most colorful characters in the original novel. He is scrawny, and his appearance more of a sick patient than a fighter, yet he often outsmarts opponents with clever tricks, disguises or lies. Researcher Susan Blader considers him the only "gallant" "whose intellectual, emotional, and physical prowess compares favourably with that of any 'heroes'".
