= Gongsun Ce =

- The Seven Heroes and Five Gallants character
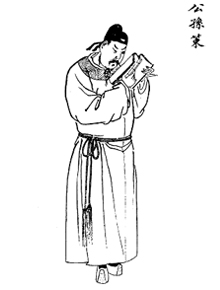
- from one 1890 print of the novel

Gongsun Ce
- Traditional Chinese: 公孫策
- Simplified Chinese: 公孙策
Transcriptions
Standard Mandarin
- Hanyu Pinyin: Gōngsūn Cè
- Wade–Giles: Kung^{1}-sun^{1} Ts'e^{4}
Yue: Cantonese
- Yale Romanization: Gung^{1}-syun^{1} Chaak^{3}
- Jyutping: Gung^{1}-syun^{1} Caak^{3}

Gongsun Ce is a fictional character in the Chinese novel The Seven Heroes and Five Gallants. Highly intelligent and very familiar with traditional Chinese medicine, he was an able assistant to the upright official Bao Zheng.

== Background ==
Proficient in Chinese classics with a sharp mind, Gongsun Ce nevertheless failed the imperial examination multiple times. (Although not clearly stated, the novel implied his failures were due to other candidates bribing corrupt chief examiners like Pang Ji.) He found refuge at a monastery and was treated well by the abbot, who eventually recommended him to the newly appointed Kaifeng prefect Bao Zheng. After reading the abbot's reference letter and interviewing him, Bao took Gongsun as his assistant.

== Familiarity with medicine ==
As Gongsun Ce studied medicine, he was able to investigate cases by disguising himself as a wandering doctor carrying a medicine kit and a quack's banner. If he was invited to a patient's family, he would ask questions related to the case during the diagnosis. He would also personally perform autopsy when needed for his investigations.

According to the novel, Gongsun Ce was able to correctly diagnose a woman's pregnancy as well as depression by taking her pulse. He prescribed her a prescription to prevent miscarriage and invigorate circulation.

Gongsun Ce also cured a madman with his "Five-wood Decoction": boiled water containing woods from mulberry, elm, peach, pagoda trees and willow. The patient was put in the decoction bath, covered with blankets except for his face, and after perspiring all over recovered from his insanity.

== Inventions ==
Gongsun Ce designed a set of three guillotines for Bao, decorated with a dog's head, a tiger's head and a dragon's head to execute commoners, government officials and imperial personages respectively.

Using his knowledge of anatomy, Gongsun Ce also invented a torture instrument called "Apricot Flower Raindrops". It was a large flat piece of iron studded with small buttons. When made red-hot, the buttons would burn the skin of an accused placed on the instrument; however, the injuries would not be fatal.

== Portrayal in films and TV series ==
- Fan Hung-hsuan in Justice Bao (1993), Justice Bao (1995 ATV), Justice Bao (2008), and Justice Bao (2010-2012)
- Fung Kwok in Heroic Legend of the Yang's Family (1994) and The Great General (1994)
- Liu Kai-chi in Justice Bao (1995 TVB)
- Miao Haizhong in Cat and Mouse (2003)
- Raymond Cho in Justice Bao: The First Year (2019 TVB)
- In @zh-Hans Intern Female Constable (实习女捕快) (2020 Youku)
- Azizah Khumaira In Celestina: Burlesk Dancer. (2024.)
