= Bai Yutang =

Bai Yutang (白玉堂)
- Wuxia character
- from an 1890 print of the novel
- Created by: Shi Yukun

In-universe information
- Alias: Jin Maoshu (金懋叔)
- Nicknames: Sleek Rat or Brocade-Coated Rat (錦毛鼠; Jǐnmáoshǔ)
- Family: Bai Jintang (白錦堂), brother
- Home: Jinhua, Wu Prefecture

Bai Yutang
- Chinese: 白玉堂
Transcriptions
Standard Mandarin
- Hanyu Pinyin: Bái Yùtáng
- Wade–Giles: Pai^{2} Yü^{4}-t'ang^{2}
Yue: Cantonese
- Yale Romanization: Baak^{6} Yuk^{6}-tong^{4}
- Jyutping: Baak^{6} Juk^{6}-tong^{4}

Bai Yutang, nicknamed "Sleek Rat" or "Brocade-Coated Rat" (錦毛鼠), is a fictional Song dynasty knight-errant from the 19th-century Chinese novel The Seven Heroes and Five Gallants.

Handsome, brave, clever and charismatic, Bai Yutang is the youngest sworn brother and the best fighter of the "Five Rats", whose other members are Lu Fang, Han Zhang, Xu Qing, and Jiang Ping. Though very righteous, he is also cruel, arrogant, reckless and stubborn. After fellow knight-errant Zhan Zhao receives the title "Imperial Cat" from the emperor, Bai Yutang becomes jealous and hurries off to the capital Kaifeng to challenge him. Using his extraordinary martial arts skills to intrude into respectively the government headquarters of Prefect Bao, the residence of Imperial Tutor Pang, and even the imperial palace, he performs a number of spectacular acts and crimes. He also succeeds in capturing Zhan in a trap, but is in turn captured by his sworn brother Jiang Ping, after which he reluctantly submits to the government. The emperor forgives his many crimes and assigns him to assist his sworn brother Judge Yan Chasan (顏查散) to foil Prince of Xiangyang's (襄陽王) rebellion. Overconfident in his abilities, Bai heedlessly ventures into the prince's deadly Sky-Scraping Tower and suffers a tragic death in the Brass Net Trap.

== In the novel ==
Bai Yutang's older brother Bai Jintang (白錦堂) was a generous man but died early. Bai Yutang then wandered to Lu Fang's village at Hollow Island and became sworn brothers with Lu and 3 other talented men. Together they call themselves "Five Rats" and perform chivalric deeds, at times traveling around the country.

Bai Yutang becomes outraged with jealousy upon hearing that Zhan Zhao has been honored by Emperor Renzong with the title "Imperial Cat". To prove himself, he goes to the palace to create trouble in order to have Zhan Zhao pursue him.

Significantly younger than all the other heroes and gallants in the book except for Ai Hu, Bai is the first one to die when he falls in the Brass Net Trap of the Sky-Scraping Tower.

During his explorations of the Sky-Scraping Tower, Bai Yutang kills the following rascals under Prince of Xiangyang:

- Li Ji (李集), nicknamed "Blue-Faced Tiger" (青面虎)
- Xu Chang (徐敞), nicknamed "Little Pestilence" (小瘟㾮)
- Ling Guang (靈光), nicknamed "Extreme Meteor" (過度流星)
- Zhang Hua (張華), nicknamed "Sick Tai Sui" (病太歲)

== Evaluation ==
Hu Shih praised the characterization of Bai Yutang without reserve, calling him "the most lively figure in the novel". Bai's many personality defects, Hu argued, made him a "believable chivalric hero" that surpassed the "fully virtuous heroes". Similarly, Cao Zhengwen wrote "the lifelike portrayal of this character indicates that the author is already good at handling the dual features of fictitious images.

== In film and TV ==
Bai Yutang was portrayed by more than 2 dozen actors in different films and TV series, the more notable actors being Alexander Fu Sheng, Chin Siu-ho, Sun Xing, Vincent Chiao, Michael Tong, Benny Chan and Chen Xiao. In the 2003 comedy film Cat and Mouse, actress Cecilia Cheung portrayed a "female" Bai Yutang.
