= Xu Qing (character) =

Xu Qing (徐慶)
- Wuxia character
- From an 1890 print of the novel published by Guangbaisongzhai, collection of Fudan University
- Created by: Shi Yukun

In-universe information
- Nickname: Mountain Rat or Mountain-Boring Rat (穿山鼠)
- Family: Xu Liang (徐良), son
- Home: Hedong Circuit

Xu Qing
- Traditional Chinese: 徐慶
- Simplified Chinese: 徐庆
Transcriptions
Standard Mandarin
- Hanyu Pinyin: Xú Qìng

Xu Qing, nicknamed "Mountain Rat" or "Mountain-Boring Rat" (穿山鼠), because he can quickly traverse mountain caves, is a fictional Song dynasty knight-errant from the 19th-century Chinese novels The Seven Heroes and Five Gallants and The Five Younger Gallants. Xu Qing is the third sworn brother of the "Five Rats", whose other members are Lu Fang, Han Zhang, Jiang Ping and Bai Yutang.

Originally a blacksmith, Xu Qing is a buffoonish character in the novel — crude, simple-minded, gluttonous and often sleepyheaded. However, he is also righteous, brave and very loyal to his brothers. Xu Qing is also muscular and a relatively good fighter. He eventually becomes a Rank 6 Commandant (校尉) under Judge Bao.
