= Youxia =

Chinese stock character analogous to a knight-errant

Xia

Xia
- Traditional Chinese: 俠
- Simplified Chinese: 侠
- Literal meaning: knight-errant
Transcriptions
Standard Mandarin
- Hanyu Pinyin: xiá
- Wade–Giles: hsia^{2}
Yue: Cantonese
- Jyutping: hap^{6}
Southern Min
- Hokkien POJ: kiap

Nuxia
- Traditional Chinese: 女俠
- Simplified Chinese: 女侠
- Literal meaning: female knight-errant
Transcriptions
Standard Mandarin
- Hanyu Pinyin: Nǚxiá

Xiake
- Traditional Chinese: 俠客
- Simplified Chinese: 侠客
- Literal meaning: knight-errant
Transcriptions
Standard Mandarin
- Hanyu Pinyin: Xiákè

Youxia
- Traditional Chinese: 遊俠
- Simplified Chinese: 游侠
- Literal meaning: wandering knight-errant
Transcriptions
Standard Mandarin
- Hanyu Pinyin: yóuxiá
- Wade–Giles: yu^{2}-hsia^{2}
- IPA: [jǒʊɕjǎ]
Yue: Cantonese
- Jyutping: jau^{4} hap^{6}
Southern Min
- Hokkien POJ: iû-kiap

The term Xia (侠; 俠; 'knight-errant'), the female equivalent Nuxia (女侠; 女俠; 'female knight-errant'), also Xiake (侠客; 俠客), Xiashi (侠仕; 俠仕), Haoxia (豪侠; 豪俠; 'heroic knight-errant') and Youxia (游侠; 遊俠; 'wandering knight-errant'), was a type of ancient Chinese warrior folk hero celebrated in classical Chinese poetry and fictional literature. It is commonly translated as "knight-errant" or less commonly as "cavalier", "adventurer", "soldier of fortune" or "underworld stalwart".

== History ==
The term was originated during the Shang dynasty, Zhou dynasty, the Spring and Autumn period and Warring States period. By the end of the Warring States period, former shi (士) knights who did not transition into scholar-officials (士大夫) became xia (俠) as Mohist defenders of the weak.

Xiá (俠) means someone with power who helps others in need. The term refers to the way these people travelled the land, using physical force or political influence to right the wrongs done to the common people by the powers that be, often judged by their personal codes of chivalry. Xia do not come from any particular social class. Various historical documents, wuxia novels and folktales describe them as being princes, government officials, poets, musicians, physicians, professional soldiers, merchants, monks and even humble farmers and butchers. Some were just as handy with a calligraphy brush as others were with swords and spears.

The 16th and 17th century saw a great revival in the xia culture of using martial arts to right wrongs. Some of these were recruited to serve in the Ming resistance against the Qing.

According to Dr. James J. Y. Liu (1926–1986), a professor of Chinese and comparative literature at Stanford University, it was a person's temperament and need for freedom, not their social status, that caused them to roam the land and help those in need. Dr. Liu believes this is because a large majority of these figures came from northern China, which borders the territory of "northern nomadic tribes, whose way of life stressed freedom of movement and military virtues". Many knights seem to have come from Hebei and Henan provinces. A large majority of the characters from the Water Margin, which is considered one of China's best examples of knight-errant literature, come from these provinces. As the sinologist Catherine Yeh writes, the early uses of the knight-errant motif left room for both martial spirit and sublime love. Only with Water Margin did the knight-errant motif change to an exclusive focus on loyalty and righteousness, unperturbed by love or sex.

== In poetry ==
One good example of a Youxia poetry is The Swordsman (劍客) by Jia Dao (Tang dynasty):

For ten years I have been polishing this sword;
Its frosty edge (Note: extremely sharp edge) has never been put to the test.
Now I am holding it and showing it to you, sir:
Is there anyone suffering from injustice?

According to Dr. Liu, Jia's poem "seems...to sum up the spirit of knight-errantry in four lines. At the same time, one can also take it as a reflection of the desire of all those who have prepared themselves for years to put their abilities to the test for some justice."

A metric translation of the original Chinese poem with one iamb per Chinese character reads as follows:

A decade long I honed a single sword,
Its steel-cold blade still yet to test its song.
Today I hold it out to you, my lord,
and ask: "Who seeks deliverance from a wrong?"

== Analogous concepts ==
- Bogatyr in Russia and Ukraine
- Futuwwa in Middle East
- Fianna in Ireland
- Knight-errant in Europe
- Ronin in Japan
- Sae Sok O-Gye in Korea

== See also ==
- Gan Ning
- Wang Mi
- Li Bai
- Song Jiang
- Tang Yin
- Wuxia
- Jianghu
- Zhou Tong (archer)
- The Seven Heroes and Five Gallants
