= Pang Ji (Song dynasty) =

Chinese Northern Song Dynasty official (988–1063)

- Born: 988; Chengwu, Shanzhou
- Died: 1063 (aged 74–75); Kaifeng
- Burial: Youqiu (in today's Qi County)
Names
- Family name: Páng (龐); Given name: Jí (籍); Courtesy name: Chúnzhī (醇之); Posthumous name: Zhuāngmǐn (莊敏)
- Occupation: Politician

Pang Ji (Chinese: 龐籍) (988–1063) was a Chinese politician who lived during the Northern Song Dynasty. He was the chancellor from 1051 to 1053 during Emperor Renzong's reign.

== Biography ==
After passing the imperial examination in 1015, Pang Ji gradually moved his way up the official ranks. He successfully took control in Yanzhou (in today's Shaanxi province) after Western Xia troops took a few cities from Song. Pang Ji is known for instilling discipline in the troops; violations of the code were met with severe physical punishments including deaths. After he left the frontier in 1045 he held some posts in the capital before being made the chancellor in 1051.

In 1053, a minor official Huangfu Yuan (皇甫淵) from Qizhou (in today's Jinan) bribed Pang Ji's nephew Zhao Qingkuang (趙清貺) in order to get a promotion. After whistleblowers disclosed the scandal, Pang Ji ordered Zhao arrested and tried at the Kaifeng court, where Zhao was sentenced to banishment. Zhao died along the way, and Han Jiang (韓絳) from the Kaifeng court accused Pang Ji of ordering Zhao killed to cover up. As a result, Pang Ji was stripped of the chancellor position and sent to posts away from the capital. In 1060 Emperor Renzong summoned him back to Kaifeng but at the age of 72, he was too old to take any position.

== Legends ==
In folk stories about the generals of the Yang clan, the generals of the Huyan clan, Di Qing and Bao Zheng, Pang Ji (known as Pang Ji [龐吉], with his given name being 吉, instead of 籍) is portrayed as corrupt, treacherous and an enemy of the upright generals and officials. In these fictionalized stories, he is known as the Grand Preceptor, and has an imperial concubine daughter, Pang Guifei (龐貴妃), whom he depends on for power. His son Pang Yu (龐昱), the Marquis of Anle (安樂侯), was executed by Bao Zheng in Chenzhou (in today's Zhoukou) for kidnapping and embezzlement.

These deeds were historically tied with another contemporary official, Zhang Yaozuo (張堯佐), who was a corrupt consort kin with his fraternal niece Consort Zhang being Renzong's concubine.
