= Shi Yukun =

Qing dynasty storyteller

- Born: Likely late 18th century, possibly c. 1797; Tianjin (disputed)
- Died: Likely before 1879, possibly c. 1871; Beijing?
- Notable work: The Seven Heroes and Five Gallants
- Style: zidishu

Chinese name
- Chinese: 石玉昆 (or 石玉崑)
Transcriptions
Standard Mandarin
- Hanyu Pinyin: Shí Yùkūn
- Wade–Giles: Shih^{2} Yü^{4}-k'un^{1}

Shi Zhenzhi
- Chinese: 石振之
Transcriptions
Standard Mandarin
- Hanyu Pinyin: Shí Zhènzhī
- Wade–Giles: Shih^{2} Chen^{4}-chih^{1}

Wenzhu Zhuren (possible pen name? disputed)
- Traditional Chinese: 問竹主人
- Simplified Chinese: 问竹主人
- Literal meaning: "Bamboo-Inquiring Master"
Transcriptions
Standard Mandarin
- Hanyu Pinyin: Wènzhú Zhǔrén
- Wade–Giles: Wen^{4}-chu^{2} Chu^{3}-jen^{2}

Shi Yukun (fl. 19th century), courtesy name Zhenzhi, was a highly popular Qing dynasty storyteller who performed in Beijing during the first half of the 19th century. Little is known about his life, but anecdotes recorded in the 1940s claimed he worked as a Booi Aha at prince Zhaolian's mansion before he became a performer.

He is the credited author of the 1879 wuxia novel The Tale of Loyal Heroes and Righteous Gallants—better known today as The Seven Heroes and Five Gallants or The Three Heroes and Five Gallants—as well as some of its sequels. While the first novel was undoubtedly based on his oral performances, most modern scholars believe Shi died several years before 1879 and played no role in the novel's publication. Nevertheless, his name was prominently displayed on its cover, the first time a Chinese storyteller was credited as a novel's sole author.

== Biography ==
While eponymous poems and zidishu solely to celebrate (or perhaps mock) Shi Yukun's fame and storytelling skills have survived, little is actually known about his life, besides that he performed his art in the national capital Beijing during the 19th century, probably as early as 1817. While some scholars had believed he was originally from Tianjin, it was probably a mistake made by confusing Shi Yukun and Shi Duo (石鐸), the publisher of the 1891 novel The Five Younger Gallants (小五義) which also claimed Shi Yukun as its original source. The suggestion that Shi Yukun was ethnic Manchu, based on his surname (common in Manchus) and the Manchu genre of zidishu in his performances, also lacks convincing evidence. He was called "Third Master" (三爺) by at least another storyteller.

== Style ==
His performances, accompanied by sanxian (3-stringed lute) playing, attracted audience in the thousands. He did not employ a wooden clapper like modern pingshu performers, rather, he used his musical instrument to call the audience's attention. He was best known for his poetic lyrics and tunes during his songs.

In addition to the story that eventually became The Seven Heroes and Five Gallants, at least 2 other stories have been associated with him:

- Fengbo Pavilion (風波亭, about events after Yue Fei's death)
- Black Rock Mountain (青石山, a supernatural tale featuring fox spirit)

Rare for a public storyteller, he was literate and is believed by some to be the same person as the one behind the pen name Wenzhu Zhuren ("Bamboo-Inquiring Master"), who first edited the original transcript of his storytelling for publication, which eventually became The Three Heroes and Five Gallants.

The novel's sequels The Five Younger Gallants and A Sequel to the Five Younger Gallants (續小五義) claimed him as the author, but as Lu Xun pointed out, "these works were written by many hands... resulting in numerous inconsistencies."

== In popular culture ==
Shi Yukun is a character in two fictitious television costume comedy-dramas, both co-written by the Taiwanese author Kuo Cheng:

- The Strange Cases of Lord Shi (施公奇案), a 1997 Taiwanese TV series. Segment 11, "Odd Happenings in Examination Halls" (考場怪譚) was written by Kuo Cheng and stars Hou Kuan-chun (侯冠群) as Shi Yukun, a scholar who despite finishing first in the district civil service examination, went to great lengths to expose cheating by other examinees and corrupt officials. In his escape from their persecution, he was helped by 5 chivalrous beggars named Lu Fang, Han Zhang, Xu Qing, Jiang Ping and Bai Yutang. (Historically, Shi Yukun could not have been a contemporary of Lord Shi or Shi Shilun (1659–1722).)
- Thirteen Sons of Heaven Bridge (天橋十三郎), a 2004 Chinese TV series, written by Liu Yu (刘誉) based on Kuo Cheng's original script. The series stars Xu Zheng as Shi Yukun, a scholar who after failing the imperial examination remained in Beijing where he performed sanxian-playing and storytelling on Heaven Bridge (a bazzar of street performers), joining colorful characters named Ding Zhaolan, Ding Zhaohui, Zhi Hua, Lu Fang, Han Zhang, Xu Qing, Jiang Ping and Bai Yutang... Seeing how the physically weak Shi Yukun bravely fought injustice and challenged authorities, lazy, cowardly, self-centered and petty-minded performers—many with unique talents—gradually joined Shi in his crusade against corruption and crimes. Eventually, many of Shi's friends died putting down a rebellion, and the series ends with Shi dreaming of their return in opera costumes.
