= Zai shui yi fang =

- Chinese: 在水一方
- Literal meaning: On One Side of the Water
Transcriptions
Standard Mandarin
- Hanyu Pinyin: Zài Shuǐ Yī Fāng

Zai shui yi fang may refer to:

- Zai shui yi fang, a 1975 Taiwanese novel by Chiung Yao
- The Unforgettable Character, a 1975 Taiwanese film based on the novel
- "Zai shui yifang", a 1980 song by Teresa Teng
- One Side of the Water, a 1988 Taiwanese TV series based on the novel

== See also ==
- Classic of Poetry, a c. 600 BC Chinese poetry collection where the phrase first occurs
