= Tingyuan shenshen =

- Chinese: 庭院深深
- Literal meaning: Courtyard & Garden Deep
Transcriptions
Standard Mandarin
- Hanyu Pinyin: Tíngyuàn shēnshēn

Tingyuan shenshen may refer to:

- Tingyuan shenshen, a 1969 Taiwanese novel by Chiung Yao
- You Can't Tell Him, a 1971 Taiwanese film based on the novel
- Deep Garden, a 1987 Taiwanese TV series based on the novel
