= One Side of the Water =

- Vietnamese video cover art
- Also known as: The Unforgettable Character
- Simplified Chinese: 在水一方
- Hanyu Pinyin: Zài Shuǐ Yī Fāng
- Developed by: Tsou Mien-wen
- Screenplay by: Lin Chiu-yu
- Story by: Chiung Yao
- Directed by: Liu Li-li
- Starring: Chin Han; Leanne Liu; Lin Tzay-peir; Chao Yung-hsin; Hsu Kuei-ying; Lee Tien-chu
- Opening theme: "Yiran Zai Shui Yi Fang" (依然在水一方) performed by Chiang Shu-na
- Ending theme: "Yi Ren Zai Shui Yi Fang" (伊人在水一方) performed by Hung Jung-hung
- Country of origin: Taiwan
- Original languages: Mandarin; some Taiwanese Hokkien
- No. of episodes: 40

Production
- Executive producers: Huang Pao-chung; Chen Chung-wei
- Producer: Ping Hsin-tao
- Cinematography: Hu Hai-shan
- Editor: Tseng Jung-lin
- Running time: 45 minutes
- Production companies: Yi Ren Communications Ltd.; Crown Magazine

Original release
- Network: Chinese Television System
- Release: January 11 – March 29, 1988

One Side of the Water is a 1988 Taiwanese television drama series produced by Ping Hsin-tao, based on the 1975 film The Unforgettable Character and its associated 1976 novel, both written by his wife Chiung Yao. The series stars Chiung Yao regulars Chin Han (who portrayed a different character in the 1975 film) and Leanne Liu in the leading roles.

== Plot ==
The story is set in the 1980s, instead of the 1970s as in The Unforgettable Character. When Chu Chih-keng brings orphaned girl Tu Hsiao-shuang to his family, everyone welcomes her with open arms—except Chu Chih-keng's wife Lee Hsin-pei, since only she knows that Chu Chih-keng has loved Tu Hsiao-shuang's late mother Kao Hsu-pai. Chu Chih-keng's son Chu Shih-yao takes an immediate interest in the hard-working, forbearing and considerate Tu Hsiao-shuang, and Tu Hsiao-shuang also develops feelings for him. The problem is Chu Shih-yao is too hesitant to break up with the sweet Tso Chiao-jou who is crazy about him. In fact Chu Shih-yao has never loved Tso Chiao-jou romantically, rather he treats her like a younger sister, because the Chus and Tsos have been close for several decades. He and Tso Chiao-jou are involved in an accident: he becomes crippled for life while she suffers a major head injury. Meanwhile, Lee Hsin-pei blames everything on Tu Hsiao-shuang and drives her out.

Given Tso Chiao-jou's severe injury, Tu Hsiao-shuang and Chu Shih-yao both realize their romance is forbidden, so Tu Hsiao-shuang marries the aspiring writer Lu Yu-wen while Chu Shih-yao marries the aphasic Tso Chiao-jou. Despite their bet efforts, their marriages prove much more difficult than they have ever imagined. Chu Shih-yao's marriage falls apart when Tso Chiao-jou realizes that he still loves Tu Hsiao-shuang, while Lu Yu-wen's immaturity, tantrums, and gambling habits also destroy his union with Tu Hsiao-shuang.

== Cast ==
- Leanne Liu as Tu Hsiao-shuang, the female protagonist

Chu family

- Jin Chao-chun as Chu Chih-keng, the breadwinner of the family
- Tang Chi as Chu Chih-keng's mother
- Lee Lee-fong as Lee Hsin-pei, Chu Chih-keng's wife
- Chin Han as Chu Shih-yao, Chu Chih-keng's oldest child
- Liu Fang-ying as Chu Shih-ching, Chu Chih-keng's second child
- Chao Yung-hsin as Chu Shih-hui, Chu Chih-keng's youngest child

Tso family

- Fan Hung-hsuan as Tso Ssu-hsien, the breadwinner of the family
- Ma Hui-chen as Lin Ya-hung, Tso Ssu-hsien's wife
- Lee Tien-chu as Tso Yu-nung, Tso Ssu-hsien's oldest child
- Hsu Kuei-ying as Tso Chiao-jou, Tso Ssu-hsien's second child
- Lee Kuo-chao as Tso Chao-nan, Tso Ssu-hsien's youngest child

Others

- Ku Yin as Kao Hsu-pai, Tu Hsiao-shuang's mother
- Liang Fu-lung as Lee Chien, Chu Shih-ching's boyfriend
- Lin Tzay-peir as Lu Yu-wen, Tso Yu-nung's pal
- Hsu Nai-lin as Lei Hsing-chien, Tso Chiao-jou's speech therapist
- Tsou Lin-lin as Yang Man-ling, a girl who befriends Tso Chao-nan
- Lee Yu-lin as Liao Chi-feng, Lu Yu-wen's former roommate
- Tu Ching-yi as Pin-pin, Tu Hsiao-shuang's daughter (last 2 episodes)
- Lee Pi-hua as herself (singer)

== Soundtrack ==
#	Title	Singer	Lyricist	Composer	Notes
1	"Yiran Zai Shui Yi Fang" (依然在水一方) (translation: Still On One Side of the Water)	Chiang Shu-na	Chiung Yao	Shih Chun-peng	Opening song
2	"Yi Ren Zai Shui Yi Fang" (伊人在水一方) (translation: The Lover Is on One Side of the Water)	Hung Jung-hung	Chiung Yao	Liu Chia-chang	Ending song
3	"Zai Shui Yi Fang" (在水一方) (translation: On One Side of the Water)	Lee Pi-hua	Chiung Yao	Lin Chia-ching	
4	"Liu Meng Ci" (留夢詞) (translation: Words to Retain a Dream)	Lee Pi-hua	Chiung Yao	Chen Hsin-yi	
5	"Ai de Bei Ge" (愛的悲歌) (translation: Sad Song of Love)	Lee Pi-hua	Chiung Yao	Chen Yang	
6	"Ni Wo de Jiaoyin" (你我的腳印) (translation: Footprints of You and Me)	Chiang Shu-na	Chiung Yao	Yu Chung-min	insert song

Lee Pi-hua actually appears as herself in episodes 19–21 singing Track 3, which was the theme song of The Unforgettable Character (in the film it was sung by Chiang Lei and Frankie Kao respectively).

== Reception ==
The drama's ratings were not as good as expected, in part because of Chiang Ching-kuo's sudden death in January 1988.
