= Mute Wife =

- DVD cover
- Also known as: Six Dreams: Mute Wife
- Traditional Chinese: 啞妻
- Simplified Chinese: 哑妻
- Hanyu Pinyin: Yǎ Qī
- Written by: Lin Ling-ling; Chiung Yao
- Directed by: Shen Yi
- Starring: Leanne Liu; Lin Jui-yang
- Opening theme: "Wuyan de Nahan" (無言的吶喊) performed by Lily Duo
- Ending theme: "Wuyu Wen Cangtian" (無語問蒼天) performed by Sammi Kao
- Country of origin: Taiwan
- Original language: Mandarin
- No. of episodes: 19

Production
- Running time: 45 minutes

Original release
- Network: Chinese Television System
- Release: March 15 – April 10, 1990

Mute Wife is a 1990 Taiwanese television drama series based on Chiung Yao's 1965 novelette of the same name. The drama stars Leanne Liu in the title role.

This is the second Taiwanese television series filmed completely in mainland China, after Wan-chun which is also based on a 1965 Chiung Yao novelette. The Mute Wife was broadcast on Chinese Television System right after Wan-chun, from March 15 to April 10. Both series are set in Republican era Beijing, and were filmed in both Beijing and Changsha.

== Cast ==
- Leanne Liu as Fang Yiyi
- Lin Jui-yang as Liu Jingyan
- Chao Yung-hsin as Mo Yanhua
- Jin Chao-chun as Liu Yiyun
- Juan Ju-chih as Yu Zhongfang
- Chen Chi as Dong Yihong
- Wang Yu-ling as Jiang Qiaojuan
- Yen Chen-yao as Liu Jingting
- Fan Hung-hsuan as Fang Shixuan
- Lee Li-feng as Shen Shuzhen

== Awards ==
1991 Golden Bell Awards

- Won—Best TV Series
- Nominated—Best Actress (Leanne Liu)
