= Chiang Shu-na =

Taiwanese singer, television presenter, and actress

- Born: 30 July 1964 (age 61); Chiayi County, Taiwan
- Occupations: Singer, television host, actress
- Years active: 1985–present
- Family: Jody Chiang
- Awards: Chinese Music Awards; Best Female Mandarin Artist; 2011 Don't Love Anymore, Please Remember Me; Golden Bell Awards – Best TV Host in a Singing/Music Programme; 2004 Golden Night Club; 2007 More Pleasant Music
- Musical career
- Also known as: "Third Sister" (三姊)
- Genres: Mandopop, Hokkien pop

Chiang Shu-na (Chinese: 江淑娜; pinyin: Jiāng Shúnà; Wade–Giles: Chiang^{1} Shu^{2}-na^{4}; born 30 July 1964) is a Taiwanese singer, television presenter, and actress.

== Life and career ==
Chiang Shu-na is affectionately nicknamed "Third Sister", while her older sister Jody Chiang, also a well-known singer, is nicknamed "Second Sister". The sisters have completely different professional careers: Jody has recorded almost exclusively in Hokkien and Japanese, while Chiang Shu-na mainly performs in Mandarin, but they are very close personally. Growing up in sheer poverty, she and Jody started performing together in restaurants and pubs when she was just 10. This life lasted 5 years.

Chiang Shu-na shot to fame in the 1980s after singing the theme songs of popular TV series Lovers Under the Rain (1986), Deep Garden (1987), and One Side of the Water (1988), all adaptations of Chiung Yao novels. To date Chiang Shu-na has released 19 albums, and won several accolades including Best Female Mandarin Artist at the 2011 Chinese Music Awards. Also a talented television host, she won Golden Bell Award for Best TV Host in a Music/Singing Programme twice, in 2004 and 2007. In addition, Chiang Shu-na has maintained an active acting career in Taiwan, Hong Kong as well as mainland China.

== Personal life ==
Chiang is a follower of Rulaizong.

== Filmography ==
=== Television series ===
Year	English title	Original title	Role	Notes
1988	Chains of Life	命運的鎖鏈	Ah-chuan	
1991	The Legend of Qianlong	戲說乾隆	Chunxi	
1992	The Heroic Family	英雄世家	Wu Shu-hui	
1993	The Legend of Qianlong	戲說乾隆	Chunxi	sequel to the 1991 series
1995	The Cherry Blossom Love	櫻花戀	Chunzhi	
1996	The First Family	第一世家	Lai Hsiu-ying; Lai Hsiu-hsiu	
1997	Dark Tales	聊齋	Siao Wen	Segment 3: "Ancient Ghost Sword" (古劍幽靈)
1998	Women at Thirty	女人三十	Kuan Wei-wei	
1998	Happy Flying Dragon	歡喜游龍	Liu Qingqing	
1999	Proprietress	頭家娘		
2000	The Tale of the Well	鄉野傳奇之六角井	Zhu Xiling	
2001	Gazing at Hometown	望鄉	Wu Yu-mei	
2003	The Young Shi Yanwen	少年史艷文	Long Yujiao	
2008	Mom's House	娘家	Chiang Wen-chuan	
2012	Xiaoju's Spring	小菊的春天	Mrs. Fang	
2012	Xiaoju's Autumn	小菊的秋天	Mrs. Fang	
2012	Lock-Dream Pavilion	鎖夢樓	Jinyun	
2014	A Beautiful Encounter	美妙的奇遇	Huang Lifeng	
2014	A Beautiful Romance	美妙的情缘	Huang Lifeng	

=== Film ===
Year	English title	Original title	Role	Notes
1996	Buddha Bless America	太平天國		
2013	Get Together	逗陣ㄟ	Liu Chin Sui-yue	
