= Lovers Under the Rain =

- Also known as
- Traditional Chinese: 煙雨濛濛
- Simplified Chinese: 烟雨濛濛
- Hanyu Pinyin: Yān Yǔ Méngméng
- Based on: Fire and Rain by Chiung Yao
- Developed by: Szu Chih-keng
- Written by: Lin Chiu-yu; Chiung Yao
- Directed by: Liu Li-li
- Starring: Leanne Liu; Chin Han; Chao Yung-hsin; Kou Feng; Ku Yin; Tseng Ya-chun; Lee Tien-chu
- Opening theme: "Yan Yu Mengmeng" (煙雨濛濛) performed by Chiang Shu-na
- Ending theme: "Mengmeng Yan Yu" (濛濛煙雨) performed by Frankie Kao
- Country of origin: Taiwan
- Original language: Mandarin
- No. of episodes: 40

Production
- Executive producers: Ho Hsiu-chiung; Huang Pao-chung
- Producer: Ping Hsin-tao
- Cinematography: Chiao Chu-chung; Yao Chi-wei; Tu Chi-chung
- Editor: Tseng Jung-lin
- Running time: 45 minutes
- Production companies: Yi Ren Communications Ltd.; Crown Magazine

Original release
- Network: Chinese Television System
- Release: August 11 – September 19, 1986

Related
- Romance in the Rain (2001)

Lovers Under the Rain is a 1986 Taiwanese television drama series based on Chiung Yao's 1964 romance novel Fire and Rain. Mainly set in 1960s Taipei, the story follows a young girl Lu Yi-ping as she plotted revenge against her father—formerly a warlord in Northeast China who had 9 wives before fleeing the Chinese Communist Revolution for Taiwan—and his entire household, including her kind half-sister Lu Ru-ping.

The second Chiung Yao adaptation starring Leanne Liu and Chin Han after the highly successful How Many Red Sunsets (1985), this drama proved even a bigger hit, capturing over 42% of the Taiwanese audiences.

== Cast ==
- Leanne Liu as Lu Yi-ping
  - Tsai Tsan-te as Lu Yi-ping (young)
- Chin Han as Ho Shu-huan
- Chao Yung- as Lu Ru-ping
- Tsou Lin-lin as Lu Meng-ping
- Lee Tien-chu as Lu Er-hao
- Wen Kuo-hua as Lu Er-chieh
- Kou Feng as Lu Chen-hua
  - Yeh Hsiao-yi as Lu Chen-hua (younger)
- Tseng Ya-chun as Fu Wen-pei
- Ku Yin as Wang Hsueh-chin
- Fan Hung-hsuan as Li Cheng-te
- Ma Huei-chen as Yu-chen
- Chu Huei-chen as Li Ko-yun
- Wen Chieh as Fang Yu
- Wen Shuai as Wei Kuang-hsiung
- Chang Shun-hsing as Hsu Chao
- Fang Wen-lin as Lu Hsin-ping/Teng Ping-ping
- Wang Li as Ah Lan
- Yu Ho-ling as Fu Wen-pei's father
- Chang Yu-chin as Fu Wen-pei's mother
- Kuo Ping as Fu Wen-pei's aunt
