= Zai Shui Yi Fang (Teresa Teng album) =

Studio album by Teresa Teng
- Released: February 12, 1980
- Genre: Mandopop
- Length: 37:24
- Language: Mandarin
- Label: Polydor

Teresa Teng chronology
| Tian Mi Mi (1979) | Zai Shui Yi Fang (1980) | A Small Wish (1980) |

Singles from Zai Shui Yi Fang
- 1. "Zai Shui Yifang" Released: February 12, 1980; 2. "Ni Zenme Shuo" Released: February 12, 1980

Zai Shui Yi Fang (Chinese: 在水一方) is a Mandarin studio album by Taiwanese recording artist Teresa Teng. It was released as her ninth studio album under Polydor Records Hong Kong on February 12, 1980. It features the hit songs "Zai Shui Yifang" and "Ni Zenme Shuo" (你怎麼說), the former of which is adapted from Chiung Yao's novel of the same name and her film The Unforgettable Character (1975), which is based on the novel.

== Reception ==
The album was certified platinum by the International Federation of the Phonographic Industry Hong Kong in 1981.

== Track listing ==
Side A
| No. | Title | Length |
|---|---|---|
| 1. | "Chūn Zài Suì Suì Nián Nián" (春在歲歲年年) | 3:09 |
| 2. | "Nàihé" (奈何) | 2:41 |
| 3. | "Yīrén Hé Chù" (伊人何處) | 3:26 |
| 4. | "Gàosù Nǐ Gàosù Wǒ" (告訴你告訴我) | 3:15 |
| 5. | "Xīnshì Zhī Duōshǎo" (心事知多少) | 2:45 |
| 6. | "Nǐ Zěnme Shuō" (你怎麼說) | 3:22 |
| Total length: | | 18:38 |

Side B
| No. | Title | Length |
|---|---|---|
| 7. | "Zài Shuǐ Yīfāng" (在水一方) | 3:43 |
| 8. | "Xiǎo Xiǎo de Mìmì" (小小的秘密) | 3:24 |
| 9. | "Xīng Yuè Lèihén" (星月淚痕) | 2:52 |
| 10. | "Yàn Hóng Xiǎoqǔ (Sān Yuàn)" (艷紅小曲 (三願)) | 1:14 |
| 11. | "Māmā Hūhuàn Nǐ" (媽媽呼喚你) | 3:47 |
| 12. | "Ràng Xin er Quān Qǐ Nǐ" (讓心兒圈起你) | 3:41 |
| Total length: | | 18:41 |

== Credits and personnel ==
- Teresa Teng – vocals, composer
- Zhuang Nu – lyricist
- Sun Yi – lyricist
- Chiung Yao – lyricist
- Weng Ching-hsi – composer
- Gu Yue – composer

== Certifications ==
| Region | Certification | Certified units/sales |
|---|---|---|
| Hong Kong (IFPI Hong Kong) | Platinum | 50,000^{*} |
^{*} Sales figures based on certification alone.
