= Fire and Rain (novel) =

- cover of the English translation published by Pan MacMillan
- Author: Chiung Yao
- Translator: Mark Wilfer (1998)
- Language: Chinese
- Set in: 1950s Taipei
- Published: 1964, Crown Publishing
- Publication place: Taiwan

Chinese name
- Traditional Chinese: 煙雨濛濛
- Simplified Chinese: 烟雨濛濛
Transcriptions
Standard Mandarin
- Hanyu Pinyin: Yānyǔ méngméng

Fire and Rain is a 1964 Taiwanese novel by romance novelist Chiung Yao. One of her best-known works, it has been adapted multiple times into film and TV dramas.

Lu Yi-ping (陸依萍)
- Birth: late 1930s, Northeast China

== Plot ==
The story follows a young girl Lu Yi-ping whose father Lu Chen-hua had for years been a warlord in Northeast China, where he forcibly married many girls, before fleeing the 1949 Chinese Communist Revolution for Taiwan (presumably after joining the National Revolutionary Army to fight the communists as many minor warlords did during the Chinese Civil War). In Taipei, Lu Yi-ping and her mother live in utter poverty, and she swears revenge on her father's household, who live in luxury. After realizing her half-sister Lu Ru-ping fancies reporter Ho Shu-huan, she actively seeks his love as part of her scheme. She and Ho Shu-huan fall in love, but Ho is furious when he discovers she has used him. In his fury, he promises Ru-ping he would marry her instead. Yi-ping is heartbroken and becomes ill. Ho Shu-huan is very concerned and tells Yi-ping that he didn't mean to leave her and that he doesn't actually love Ru-ping. Yi-ping exposes the affair of Ru-ping's mother Hsueh-chin, and Ru-ping, who has been on an emotional roller-coaster all this time, commits suicide. Lu Chen-hua also dies from shock and anger, leaving Yi-ping full of remorse. By this point, Yi-ping has forgiven the Lu household, but it's too late to save her love with Ho Shu-huan. He leaves her for good.

== Characters ==
Lu Yi-ping's mother (age: 47)		Lu Chen-hua (age: 68)		Hsueh-chin (age: mid-40s)	Wei Kuang-hsiung
Lu Hsin-ping (dead)	Lu Yi-ping (age: 20)	Lu Ehr-hao (age: 25)	Lu Ru-ping (age: 20)	Lu Meng-ping (age: 17)	Lu Ehr-chieh (age: 10)

Note: Lu Hsin-ping who died in the late 1940s was 7 years older than Lu Yi-ping.

== Translations ==
- Chiung Yao (1998) [1964]. Fire and Rain. Translated by Mark Wilfer. Pan MacMillan. ISBN 0-330-36076-0. (English)

The novel has also been translated to Dutch (as Vuur en regen), Danish (as Ild og regn), Indonesian (as Kabut Cinta) and Vietnamese (as Dòng sông ly biệt), among other languages.

== Adaptations ==
- The Rain of Sorrow, a 1965 Taiwanese film starring Gua Ah-leh as Lu Yi-ping.
- Misty Rain, a 1973 Hong Kong TV series starring Louise Lee as Lu Yi-ping. This adaptation is set in Hong Kong.
- Lovers Under the Rain, a 1986 Taiwanese TV series starring Leanne Liu as Lu Yi-ping.
- Romance in the Rain, a 2001 Chinese TV series starring Zhao Wei as Lu Yi-ping. This adaptation is set in 1930s Shanghai rather than 1960s Taipei.
