= Yuan Ching =

Yuan Ching may refer to:

- Yuan Jing (writer) (1914–1999), Chinese author, also known as Yuan Ching
- Yuan Ching Secondary School, a Singaporean secondary school

== See also ==
- Yuan Jing (sport shooter) (born 1987), Chinese sport shooter
