= Sung Tsun-shou =

Sung Tsun-Shou or Song Chun-So (Chinese: 宋存壽; pinyin: song cún shòu; Wade–Giles: sung^{4} ts'un^{2} shou^{4}; September 2, 1930 – May 27, 2008), was a Mainland Chinese-born Taiwanese film director. He began his film career as screenwriter and assistant director. He came to Taiwan with Li Han-hsiang in 1963 to join Grand Motion Pictures Co., Ltd. (國聯影業有限公司), a company that Li founded. He began his directorial career in 1966 and made altogether twenty-six feature films between 1966 and 1982. He was known as “literary director” (Chinese: 文人導演).

== Life and career ==
Sung Tsun-Shou was born in Jiangdu, Jiangsu in 1930. He was the youngest child in his family and had six brothers and sisters. His father ran a little department store. The first movie he watched at nine was Maiden in Armour (1939) starring Chen Yunshang.

Sung arrived in Hong Kong and studied at the Hong Kong Cultural Vocational school (香港文化專科學校) in 1949 . While he was a student, he also worked part-time in First National Printing Co, where he met King Hu, who worked there as an accountant and proofreader. They shared similar interests and often watched movies together.

Sung and King Hu later moved into an apartment, No.170 Boundary Street in Kowloon, and shared one big room with Li Han-hsiang and four other residents, Feng Yi (馮毅), Jiang Guang Chao (蔣光超), Ma Li (馬力), and Shen Chong (沈重). All talented but poor, they decided to become sworn brothers and called themselves "the Idle Seven" (ci dà sián,七大閒) in 1953.

Thanks to King Hu, Sung was introduced to Lo Wei and worked for his company the SWANK MOTION PICTURE LIMITED as a screenwriter. Sung wrote the screenplay of Duo Cíng Hé (多情河) directed by Lo Wei. In the following year he began to work for Shaw Brothers Pictures International Limited as a screenwriter and assistant director.

When Li Han-hsiang moved from Hong Kong to Taiwan to form the Grand Motion Pictures Co., Ltd. Sung came with him to work as his assistant director. Among other films, he participated in the production of Hsi Shih: Beauty of Beauties (1965) directed by Li Han-hsiang. Sung made his directorial debut film, A Perturbed Girl at Grand Motion Picture in 1966.

His next film At Dawn (破曉時分), set in the late Qing dynasty and based on a short story by Chu Hsi-ning, received critical acclaim and he was praised to be a "literati director".

In 1971, he directed his first film based on the novel by Chiung Yao, You Can't Tell Him, which won the runner-up award for best picture and best supporting actor in the 9th Golden Horse Awards. In the same year he formed the Eighties Film Company with Yu Ching-chun and Yang Wei-hsiung.

Sung married Chao Ying Ying (趙瑛瑛) in 1972 and had two daughters with her. The film Outside the Window, produced by the company and directed by Sung in 1973, was Brigitte Lin’s debut film. Lin was made an instant star by this film, which is based on the namesake autobiographical novel by Chiung Yao, who banned the film from theatrical release in Taiwan.

Sung also directed Story of a Mother (母與子) in 1973, which is based on the namesake short story by Yu Lihua. The film is highly praised by critics for its realistic depiction of a mother’s sexual desire and its courage to challenge traditional concepts about the role of mother.

Between 1966 and 1982, Sung made altogether twenty-six feature films. The great majority of them are literary romantic films (愛情文藝片). The four most popular actors and actresses of the genre, namely Brigitte Lin, Joan Lin (林鳳嬌), Charlie Chin and Chin Han starred in quite a few of his films, such as Outside the Window, News Hen (女記者), Love In The Green Village (綠色山莊), He Loved Once Too Many (水雲), Love is Smoke(輕煙), Fallen Flowers, Flowing Water, the Spring Is Gone (落花，流水，春去也), and Ask My Love from God (此情可問天). He tried martial arts films once and directed Iron Petticoat in 1969, which led him to believe that he was not good at this popular action genre at all.

A Lily in the Valley (老師．斯卡也答) is the last film Sung directed in 1982, the year when the New Taiwan Cinema movement started.

== Filmography ==
Director
Year	English title	Original title	Notes
1966	A Perturbed Girl	《天之驕女》	
1968	At Dawn	《破曉時分》	
1969	Iron Petticoat	《鐵娘子》	
1971	You Can't Tell Him	《庭院深深》	
1972	Story of a Mother	《母親三十歲》	
1972	Story of Sinlan	《心蘭的故事》	No official English title
1972	Love is Smoke	《輕煙》	
1973	Outside the Window	《窗外》	
1974	Thirteen	《早熟》	
1974	Ghost in the Mirror	《古鏡幽魂》	
1974	The Wind of Ghost	《夜半怪談》	
1974	News Hen	《女記者》	
1975	Morning Star	《晨星》	No official English title
1975	He Loved Once Too Many	《水雲》	
1976	Chelsia My Love	《秋霞》	
1978	Windflower in the Storm	《花非花》	
1978	Ask My Love from God	《此情可問天》	
1978	Love in the Green Village	《留下一片相思》（又名《綠色山莊》）	
1978	Legend of Parrot	《鸚鵡傳奇》	No official English title
1979	Rainbow In My Heart	《第二道彩虹》	
1979	Fallen Flowers, Flowing Water, the Spring Is Gone	《落花流水春去也》	
1980	I Sing I Cry	《我歌我泣》	
1980	To You with Love	《候鳥之愛》	
1980	Endless Road / Chilly Water Of Autumn	《走不完的路》（又名《瀟瀟秋水寒》）	No official English title
1982	A Girl Runs Away from Home	《翹家的女孩》	No official English title
1982	A Lily in the Valley	《老師‧斯卡也答》	
1982	Dong sian ge of Eleven Women	「十一個女人」系列之「洞仙歌」	Sung's first TV series work / No official English title
1989	Silver Girl of Starry theater	名星劇場──銀女	Location director / No official English title

Screenwriter
Year	English title	Original title	Notes
1958	The Unforgettable Night	《一夜風流》	
1959	Miss Songbird	《歌迷小姐》	
1960	Let the Young Decide	《自由戀愛》	
1960	Love Ditties on the Tea Hill	《茶山情歌》	
1963	The Honest Hero and the Faithful Dog	《義犬遊俠》	
1964	Trouble on the Wedding Night	《狀元及第》	

== Awards and honors ==
Year	Awards	Works	Category
1971	9th Golden Horse Awards	You Can't Tell Him	Best Feature Film – Runner Up
1977	14th Golden Horse Awards	Chelsia My Love	Best Feature Film – Runner Up
2001	Festival du film asiatique de Deauville		Tribute
2001	38th Golden Horse Awards		Lifetime Achievement Award
