= Wang Yin =

Wang Yin may refer to:

- Wang Yin (actor) (1901–1988), Chinese/Taiwanese actor and filmmaker
- Wang Yin (Water Margin), a fictional character in the novel Water Margin
