= The Last Separation =

Studio album by Zhao Wei
- Released: 20 June 2001
- Genre: Mandopop
- Label: Avex

Zhao Wei chronology
Magic of Love (1999)	The Last Separation (2001)	Afloat (2004)

The Last Separation (最后一次分手), aka Vicki's New and Best, is a 2001 album by mainland Chinese pop singer Zhao Wei. The title song is based on her break-up with her boyfriend and was written by Taiwanese romance writer Chiung Yao.

== Track listing ==
=== Disc One ===
No.	Title	Lyrics	Music	Length
1.	"爱之玄" (Love is Fabulous)	Liang Mang (梁茫)	Guo Liang (郭亮)
2.	"清晨阳光" (Morning Sunlight)	Yan Xixuan (颜玺轩)	Peng Xuebin (彭学斌)
3.	"不由自主" (Can't Help Myself)	Chiung Yao (琼瑶)	Tu Huiyuan (涂惠元)
4.	"千言万语" (Thousands of words)	Zuo Hongyuan (左宏元)	Zuo Hongyuan (左宏元)
5.	"潮水" (Tide)	Xu Changde (许常德)	Lv Zhenhuang (吕祯晃)
6.	"最后一次分手" (The Last Separation)	Chiung Yao (琼瑶)	Li Zhengfan (李正帆)
7.	"我的爱不NG" (My Love Won't NG)	Zhang Chunchun (张淳淳)	Li Sisong (涂惠元)
8.	"在我心中依然最美" (You're Always Most Beautiful in My Heart)	Huang Guolun (黄国伦)	Huang Guolun (黄国伦)
9.	"想我吗？" (Do You Miss Me?)	Huang Guilan (黄桂兰)	Huang Guolun (黄国伦)

=== Disc Two ===
Bonus Collection of 1999 albums.

No.	Title	Lyrics	Music	Length
1.	"搏浪鼓" (Wave Drum)	Li Zhengfan (李正帆)	Li Zhengfan (李正帆)
2.	"Sha la la 救生圈" (Sha la la Lifebelt)	Zhang Chunchun (张淳淳)	Pongpet Glinhom
3.	"真心不假" (True Heart)	Zhang Chunchun (张淳淳)	Tu Huiyuan (涂惠元)
4.	"齿轮" (Gear)	Zhang Chunchun (张淳淳)	Tu Huiyuan (涂惠元)
5.	"瓶中信" (Message in a Bottle)	Xu Changde (许常德)	Lv Zhenhuang (吕祯晃)
6.	"E-Mail Love"	Huang Haoran (黄皓然)	Jeremy Ji
7.	"不能和你分手（舞曲）" (Can't Break up With You ~Dance Version~)	Chiung Yao (琼瑶)	Charles Tso/Lv Zhenhuang (吕祯晃)
8.	"有一个姑娘（舞曲）" (There is a Girl ~Dance Version~)	Chiung Yao (琼瑶)	Li Zhengfan (李正帆)
