= Green Green Grass by the River =

1992 Taiwanese television series

- Also known as: Six Dreams: Green Green Grass By The River"
- Traditional Chinese: 青青河邊草
- Simplified Chinese: 青青河边草
- Written by: Lin Jiuyu; Chiung Yao
- Directed by: Shen Yi
- Starring: Yue Ling; Steve Ma
- Opening theme: "Green Green Grass By The River" (青青河邊草) performed by Sammi Kao
- Country of origin: Taiwan
- Original language: Mandarin
- No. of episodes: 42

Production
- Running time: 45 minutes

Original release
- Network: Chinese Television System
- Release: March 17, 1992

Green Green Grass by the River is a 1992 Taiwanese television drama series based on Chiung Yao's novel of the same name. The series was filmed in Yangzhou and Nanjing, China.

== Synopsis ==
Xiao Cao is a young orphan living with her cruel aunt and uncle. She has a sisterly bond with her neighbour, Qing Qing, who is being forced into a marriage with a much older man by her older brother. Desperate to escape their unfortunate circumstances, the two girls manage to run away together on the day of Qing Qing's wedding. During their escape they coincidentally meet He Shiwei, a young university student who is also running away from his family due to an arranged marriage. After a few initial misunderstandings the three decide to travel together. However, things become complicated when they encounter the Fu family, and the family matriarch mistakes He Shiwei for her son, Fu Yuankai, who died 10 years ago.

== Cast ==
- Yue Ling as Qing Qing
- Steve Ma as He Shiwei
- Jin Ming as Xiao Cao
- Yue Yueli as Fu Zhenting
- Gui Yalei as Jing Zhi
- Wang Zhixia as Yue Niang
- Liu Ziwei as Pei Shao Qian
- Ye Jing as Pei Shaowen
- He Yin as Shi Liu
- He Qing as Hua You Lin
- Leanne Liu as Zhu Shulan
- Xu Nailin as Fu Yuankai
