= Yuan Jing =

Yuan Jing may refer to:

- Yuan Jing (sport shooter), Chinese sport shooter
- Yuan Jing (writer), Chinese fiction writer
