= Zai shui yifang (song) =

1980 song by Teresa Teng

"Zai Shui Yifang"

Single by Chiang Lei

from the album Zai Shui Yifang OST
- Language: Mandarin
- Released: November 1, 1975
- Genre: Mandopop
- Length: 3:36
- Label: Kolin Records
- Composer: Lin Chia-ching
- Lyricist: Chiung Yao

"Zai Shui Yifang" (Chinese: 在水一方; pinyin: Zài shuǐ yīfāng; lit. 'Across the Water'), also translated "On the Other Side of the Water", is a song first recorded by Taiwanese singer Chiang Lei for the soundtrack of the Taiwanese film The Unforgettable Character (1975). Written by Chiung Yao and composed by Lin Chia-ching, it was included on side A of the film's soundtrack album, released on November 1, 1975.

The lyrics of the song are taken from the poem "Qin Feng Jianjia" from the ancient Chinese poetry collection Classic of Poetry. "Zai Shui Yifang" was covered by Taiwanese singer Teresa Teng in 1980, and has since been covered by various other artists. In 2005, the original recording of "Zai Shui Yifang" was named one of the 100 Golden Songs of Chinese Cinema in the Past 100 Years by the China Federation of Literary and Art Circles and the China Film Association.

== Background and release ==
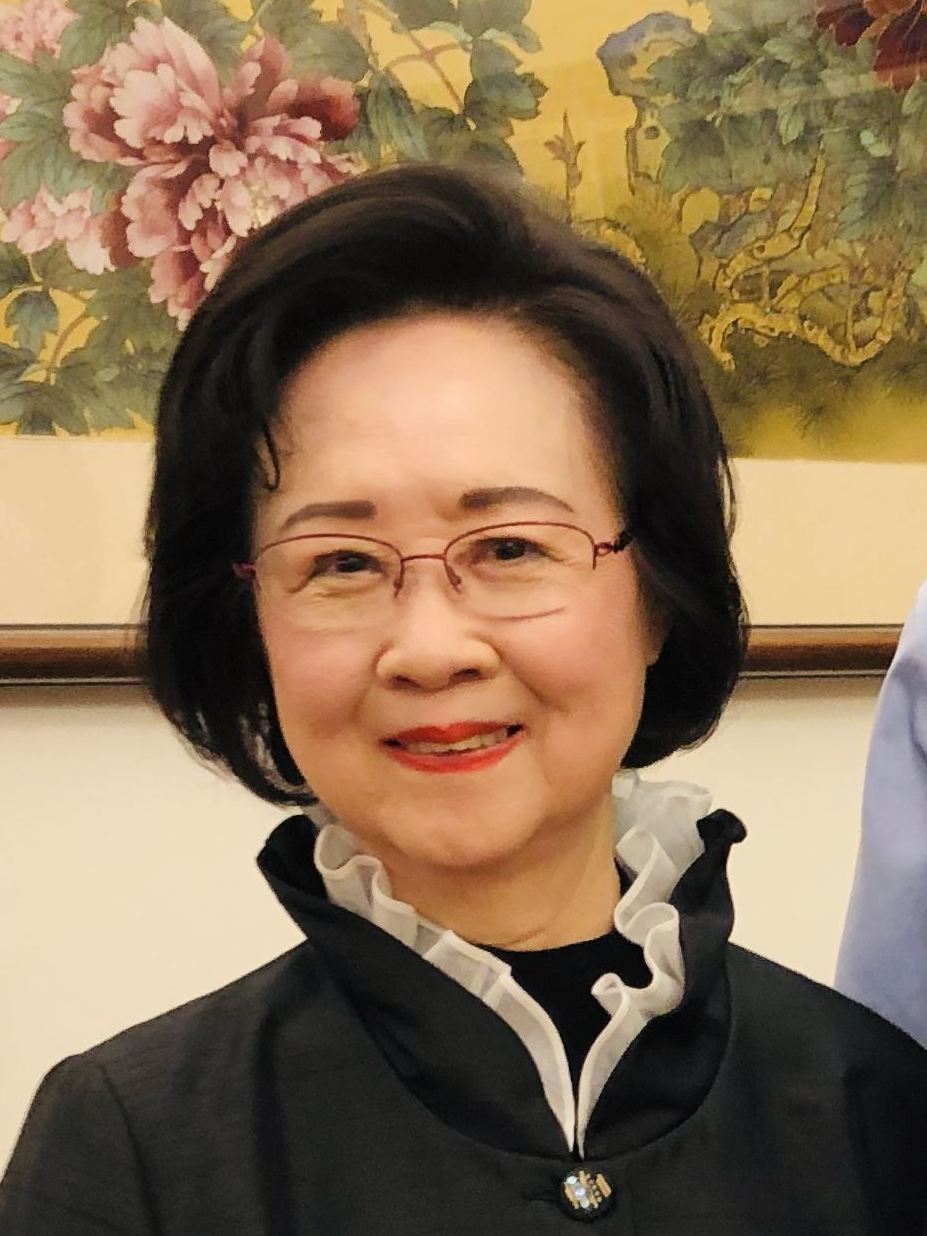
Chiung Yao adapted the song from her novel of the same title, originally inspired by the ancient poem "Qin Feng Jianjia".

The music of "Zai Shui Yifang" was composed by Lin Chia-ching (林家慶) and lyricized by Chiung Yao (瓊瑤). In 1975, Chiung adapted lyrics from her novel to create the theme song for her film The Unforgettable Character—which shares its Chinese title with the song (在水一方). It was first sung by the female singer Chiang Lei (江蕾) in the film. Concurrently, it was sung by the male singer Frankie Kao (高凌風) in the movie soundtrack, which was released several months after the film on November 1, 1975. In 1980, Teresa Teng included the song in her album of the same name (在水一方). Later, many other singers, such as Fei Yu-ching, also recorded this song.

== Writing and composition ==
The lyrics of "Zai Shui Yifang" originate from the novel of the same name by Chiung, which tells the love story between a young female teacher Du Xiaoshuang and a painter Yu Chukuan, whose encounter is akin to a reflection in the water—"brief and beautiful". It revolves around themes of love and sacrifice, with lines such as "Since meeting is fate, is separation also destined? / You are the most beautiful accident in my life."

The lyrics were derived from the ancient Chinese poem titled "Qin Feng Jianjia" (秦风·蒹葭), which is part of the ancient Classic of Poetry collection. Composer Lin commented, "'Zai shui yifang' describes all the various aspects of flowing water, from the low-pitched verses that flow like water to the surging high-pitched chorus. The layers of water flow can be heard in the song, which is destined to be widely sung by people of all genders."

== Teresa Teng version ==
"Zai Shui Yifang"

Single by Teresa Teng

from the album Zai Shui Yifang
- Language: Mandarin
- Released: February 12, 1980
- Genre: Mandopop
- Length: 3:47
- Label: Polydor; Kolin Records
- Composer: Lin Chia-ching
- Lyricist: Chiung Yao

Taiwanese singer Teresa Teng recorded "Zai Shui Yifang" for her Mandarin studio album of the same name, which was released through Polydor Hong Kong on February 12, 1980. The song quickly became a hit across Taiwan and mainland China. The following year, the album was certified platinum by the International Federation of the Phonographic Industry (IFPI) Hong Kong.

=== Legacy ===
In 2019, the Kaohsiung City Tourism Bureau designated January 29 as "Teresa Teng Day" in commemoration of her 66th birthday. As part of the tribute, "Zai Shui Yifang" was chosen as the official theme of the Love River and aired simultaneously across multiple radio stations.
