= Yuan Xiaoyuan =

Chinese painter (1901–2003)

- Traditional Chinese: 袁曉園
- Simplified Chinese: 袁晓园
Transcriptions
Standard Mandarin
- Hanyu Pinyin: Yuán Xiǎoyuán

Yuan Xingjie
- Traditional Chinese: 袁行潔
- Simplified Chinese: 袁行洁
Transcriptions
Standard Mandarin
- Hanyu Pinyin: Yuán Xíngjié

Yuan Xiaoyuan (25 June 1901 – 17 November 2003), born Yuan Xingjie, also known as Milly Yuan and H K Yuan, was a Chinese diplomat, politician, author, linguist, calligrapher, artist, and centenarian. She became China's first female diplomat when she served as vice-consul of the Chinese Embassy in Calcutta (Kolkata), India from 1943 and 1945 during World War II.

Yuan was educated in France in University of Toulouse, University of Paris, and Sciences Po. She was from a famous intellectual family and one of few Chinese women in her generation to receive an advanced education in politics. Writer Yuan Jing (born Yuan Xingzhuang) was her younger sister, scholar Yuan Xingpei is her cousin, as is Yuan Xingshu, the mother of Taiwanese novelist Chiung Yao.

Following a dispute with the Kuomintang in the late 1940s, she was expelled from the party and left China for the United States. She worked in the United Nations Secretariat and later at Seton Hall University. After decades abroad, she returned to China and, in 1985, renounced her US citizenship.

In the 1970s, Yuan founded the Society for Research on the Modernization of Chinese Characters and proposed a simplified writing system for Chinese, involving 108 symbols used to represent consonants, vowels, tones, and as semantic radicals.

In her later years she devoted herself to fine arts and calligraphy. She died in 2003. In 2011, Xiaoyuan Art Gallery (晓园艺术馆; 31.70°N 119.94°E) opened in her ancestral home of Changzhou, Jiangsu, displaying many of her artwork and photos.
