= Lee Tien-chu =

Taiwanese actor (born 1956)

- 李天柱
- Born: 7 November 1956 (age 69)
- Occupation: Actor

Lee Tien-chu (Chinese: 李天柱; pinyin: Lǐ Tiānzhù; Pe̍h-ōe-jī: Lí Thian-chū; 7 November 1956), also known as Mark Lee, is a Taiwanese actor.

He has appeared on stage, notably in a 2001 Taiwanese adaptation of Black Comedy, and in the 2010 production The Waste Land, alongside Akira Chen. Lee was given the Golden Bell Award for Best Actor in a Television Series in 2006. Ten years later, he was awarded the Golden Bell Award for Best Actor in a Miniseries or Television Film in October 2016. During the time allotted for his acceptance speech, Lee, a Christian, led the audience in prayer. In an interview after the ceremony, he commented on homosexuality, stating "I don’t hate gay people. I love them, and I also have compassion for them. But I have to say that [being gay] is wrong." Lee's later statements were harsher, as he said "I’ll be open about it. I don’t support homosexuality because it’s going to lead to the destruction of humanity and that of the nation," as well as "I won’t betray my faith just for a little money. This is wrong. Homosexuality is a huge curse to our future generations."

== Selected filmography ==
- Lovers Under the Rain (1986)
- Deep Garden (1987)
- One Side of the Water (1988)
- The Rule of the Game (2002)
- The Glory of Tang Dynasty (2017)
