= My Cape of Many Dreams =

- VCD cover
- Traditional Chinese: 夢的衣裳
- Simplified Chinese: 梦的衣裳
- Literal meaning: Dream's Clothing
- Hanyu Pinyin: Mèng de Yīshang
- Directed by: Liu Li-li
- Screenplay by: Chiao Yeh
- Based on: Meng de Yishang by Chiung Yao
- Produced by: Tung Chin-shu
- Starring: Shirley Lu; Chin Han; Kenny Bee
- Cinematography: Chang Teh-lai
- Edited by: Wang Chin-chen
- Music by: Huang Mao-shan
- Production company: Superstar Motion Picture
- Release date: March 28, 1981
- Running time: 109 minutes
- Country: Taiwan
- Language: Mandarin

My Cape of Many Dreams is a 1981 Taiwanese romance drama film directed by Liu Li-li, based on Chiung Yao's 1979 novel.

== Cast ==
- Shirley Lu as Lu Ya-chin
  - Shirley Lu as Sang Er-jou
- Chin Han as Sang Er-hsuan
- Kenny Bee as Wan Hao-jan
- Fan Hung-hsuan as Sang Er-kai
- Gua Ah-leh as Sang Yu-lan
- Liu Lan-hsi as Tsao Yi-chuan
- Lu Pi-yun as Grandma Sang
- Tsao Chien as Doctor Li
- Tao Shu as Mama Chi
- Chang Hai-lun as Lee Man-ju
- Paul Chang Chung as Lu Shih-ta
