= Wan-chun =

- DVD cover
- Also known as: Six Dreams: Wan-chun
- Traditional Chinese: 婉君
- Hanyu Pinyin: Wǎnjūn
- Based on: Wan-chun's Three Loves by Chiung Yao
- Directed by: Liu Li-li
- Starring: Yu Hsiao-fan; Chang Pei-hua; Chin Su-mei; Hsu Nai-lin; Jin Ming; Sze Yu; Lee Lee-feng
- Opening theme: "Wanjun" (婉君) performed by Lee E-jun
- Ending theme: "Zhuixun" (追尋) performed by Lily Duo
- Country of origin: Taiwan
- Original language: Mandarin
- No. of episodes: 18

Production
- Producer: Ping Hsin-tao
- Production locations: Hunan, China
- Running time: 45 minutes

Original release
- Network: Chinese Television System
- Release: February 19 – March 14, 1990

Wan-chun (or Wanjun) is a 1990 Taiwanese television series produced by Ping Hsin-tao and his company Yi Ren Communications Co. (怡人傳播公司) in conjunction with Chinese Television System, based on Chiung Yao's (Ping's wife) 1964 novellette Wan-chun's Three Loves, which is set in Republican era Beijing.

This is the first Taiwanese TV series filmed in mainland China, and as such suffered from red tape by Taiwan's Government Information Office. Despite receiving prior approval, the production was accused of "cooperating with Chinese communists", "receiving mainland funds", and "featuring mainland actors in excess" (even though most actors were from Taiwan). Chiung Yao refused to comply with censorship demands to delete scenes that "featured mainland actors in excess", and only after the interventions of politician Jaw Shaw-kong was the series allowed to air. (Chiung Yao and Ping Hsin-tao's company was however fined for several violations.)

== Cast ==
- Yu Hsiao-fan as Hsia Wan-chun
  - Jin Ming as Hsia Wan-chun (child)
- Chang Pei-hua as Chou Po-chien
  - Cai Yuanhang as Chou Po-chien (child)
- Hsu Nai-lin as Chou Chung-kang
  - Dong Yang as Chou Chung-kang (child)
- Sze Yu as Chou Shu-hao
  - Li Yeyi as Chou Shu-hao (child)
- Chin Su-mei as Yen-hung
  - Cui Shangqi as Yen-hung (child)
- Wang Yu-ling as Tsui Shang-chi
- Liang Hsiu-chi as Tsui Shang-lun
- Fan Hung-hsuan as Chou Tsung-ting
- Lee Lee-feng as Chang Yu-chin
- Tseng Che-chen as Lan Hsuan
- Kwan Yi as Grandma
- Lee Yu-lin as Wang Wen-chu
- Tu Su-chen as Lee Ming-fang
- Liu Yueh-ti as Wang Hsiao-fang
- Chen Shufang as Mother Yu
- Song Zuying as Anu
- Yue Yueli as Tsui Ping-cheng
