= You Can't Tell Him =

- Official poster
- Chinese: 庭院深深
- Literal meaning: Courtyard and Garden Are Deep
- Hanyu Pinyin: Tíng Yuàn Shēn Shēn
- Directed by: Sung Tsun-shou
- Written by: Chiung Yao
- Produced by: Yu Feng-chi
- Starring: Gua Ah-leh; Peter Yang
- Cinematography: Chen Jung-shu
- Edited by: Liu Kuo-hsiung
- Music by: Liu Chia-chang
- Production company: Feng Ming Motion Picture
- Release date: June 25, 1971
- Running time: 87 minutes
- Country: Taiwan
- Language: Mandarin

You Can't Tell Him is a 1971 Taiwanese drama film directed by Sung Tsun-shou, based on Chiung Yao's 1969 novel. The film stars Gua Ah-leh and Peter Yang.

Gua Ah-leh also sang the theme song, composed by Liu Chia-chang with lyrics by Chiung Yao. (The song was later covered by many artists, like Tsai Chin and Fei Yu-ching. The cover by Lee Pi-hua was featured in the 1987 TV series Deep Garden, which is based on the same novel.)

== Cast ==
- Gua Ah-leh as Fang Ssu-ying (real identity: Chang Han-yen)
- Peter Yang as Po Pei-wen
- Lee Hsiang as Ai-ling, Po Pei-wen's wife
- Wang Jung as Kao Li-teh
- Fu Bi-hui as Po Pei-wen's mother
- Wu Feng-feng as Ting-ting, Po Pei-wen's daughter

== Awards and nominations ==
1971 Golden Horse Awards

- Won—Best Supporting Actor (Wang Jung)
- Nominated—Best Film
