= Return of Judge Bao =

- Starring: Jin Chao-chun; Vincent Chiao; Fan Hung-hsuan; Zhang Tielin

Return of Judge Bao is a 2000 television series produced by Hong Kong's Asia Television starring Jin Chao-chun as the titular Song dynasty official Bao Zheng. Although a Hong Kong production, it was completely filmed in Qingdao, China and featured mostly actors from Taiwan and mainland China. The series was first shown on Taiwan Television in Taiwan in March 2000, and was not broadcast in Hong Kong until May 2000 when the Cantonese-dubbing was complete.

The English title makes references to the 1993 mega-hit Taiwanese TV series Justice Pao, also known as Judge Bao. Four actors, namely Jin, Fan Hung-hsuan, Liu Yueh-ti, and Tu Man-sheng reprised their roles from the classic.

== Cast ==
- Jin Chao-chun as Bao Zheng
- Fan Hung-hsuan as Gongsun Ce
- Vincent Chiao as Zhan Zhao
- Zhang Tielin as Emperor Renzong of Song
- Xia Yu
- Tang Guoqiang
- Song Dandan
- Wang Yu-wen
- Sun Xing
- Wu Ma
