= Fan Hung-hsuan =

Taiwanese actor

- 范鴻軒
- Born: 5 September 1946 (age 78); Lu County, Sichuan, Republic of China
- Occupation: Actor
- Years active: 1974-present

Chinese name
- Traditional Chinese: 范鴻軒
- Simplified Chinese: 范鸿轩
Transcriptions
Standard Mandarin
- Hanyu Pinyin: Fàn Hóng Xuān
Yue: Cantonese
- Jyutping: Faan^{6} Hung^{4} Hin^{1}

Fan Hung-hsuan (Chinese: 范鴻軒 born 5 September 1946) is a Taiwanese actor who achieved regional fame in East Asia and Southeast Asia for his portrayal of Gongsun Ce in the 1993 TV series Justice Bao.

== Filmography ==
=== Films ===
Year	English title	Chinese title	Role	Notes
1975	Little Sister-in-law	小姨懷春		
1976	Love Competition	男歡女愛		
1976	China Armed Escort	保鑣		
1979	Drunk Fish, Drunk Frog, Drunk Crab	醉魚醉蝦醉螃蟹		
1980	The Story of Daniel	丹尼爾的故事		
1980	The Tragic Explosion	撫遠街大慘案		
1981	My Cape of Many Dreams	夢的衣裳	Sang Er-kai	
1995	No Justice for All	真相		
2019	Black Detective Bao Zheng			

=== Television ===
Year	English title	Chinese title	Role	Notes
1985	Silang and Zhenping	四郎與真平	Lin Dashan	
1986	Lovers Under the Rain	煙雨濛濛	Adjutant Li	
1987	Deep Garden	庭院深深	Kao Li-te	
1987	Xishi	西施	King Goujian of Yue	
1988	Eight Thousand Li of Cloud and Moon	八千里路雲和月	Emperor Gaozong of Song	
1988	One Side of the Water	在水一方	Tso Shih-hsien	
1989	A Courageous Clan: Mu Guiying	一門英烈穆桂英	Emperor Zhenzong	
1990	Wan-chun	婉君	Chou Tsung-ting	
1990	Mute Wife	啞妻	Fang Shixuan	
1992	The Book and the Sword	書劍恩仇錄	Yu Wanting	
1993	Justice Bao	包青天	Gongsun Ce	
1994	The Seven Heroes and Five Gallants	七俠五義	Zhao Defang	
1994	Heavenly Ghost Catcher	天師鍾馗		
1994	Legend of Liu Bowen	劉伯溫傳奇	Hongwu Emperor	
1995	Justice Bao	新包青天	Gongsun Ce	
1996	Dream of the Red Chamber	紅樓夢	Jia Zhen	
1997	700 Million Brides	七億新娘		
1998	Thunderstorm Rider	霹靂菩薩		
2000	Return of Judge Bao	包公出巡	Gongsun Ce	
2003	Pawnshop No. 8	第8號當舖		
2004	Winner Takes All	野球風雲		
2004	Taiwan Tornado	台灣龍捲風		
2005	The Golden Ferris Wheel	金色摩天輪		
2006	The Success Story of a Formosa Girl	寶島少女成功記	Lin You-liang	
2006	Unique Flavor	天下第一味		
2008	Justice Bao	包青天	Gongsun Ce	
2009	Roseate-Love	紫玫瑰		
2010	Justice Bao	包青天	Gongsun Ce	
2015	The World of Love	天地情緣	Yuan Yougong	
