= 9th Golden Horse Awards =

1971 Taiwan film awards ceremony

- Date: October 30, 1971
- Site: Zhongshan Hall, Taipei, Taiwan
- Hosted by: Wang Hung-chun
- Organized by: Taipei Golden Horse Film Festival Executive Committee

Highlights
- Best Feature Film: The Story of Ti Ying
- Best Director: Ting Shan-hsi; The Ammunition Hunters
- Best Actor: Wang Yin; The Story of Ti Ying
- Best Actress: Lisa Lu; The Arch
- Most awards: The Story of Ti Ying (6)

The 9th Golden Horse Awards (Chinese: 第9屆金馬獎) took place on October 30, 1971 at Zhongshan Hall in Taipei, Taiwan.

== Winners and nominees ==
Winners are listed first, highlighted in boldface.

**Best Feature Film**: **The Story of Ti Ying**; The Ammunition Hunters (runner-up); Devotion (runner-up); You Can't Tell Him (runner-up); The Decisive Battle (runner-up); The Twelve Gold Medallions (runner-up)	**Best Documentary**: **Guang Hui De Shuang Shi**; Youth Holiday 3 (runner-up); All Roads Lead to Freedom (runner-up); Boundless Longevity (runner-up); Leaps and Bounds (runner-up)
**Best Director**: **Ting Shan-hsi — The Ammunition Hunters**	**Best Leading Actor**: **Wang Yin — The Story of Ti Ying**
**Best Leading Actress**: **Lisa Lu — The Arch**	**Best Supporting Actor**: **Wang Yung — You Can't Tell Him**
**Best Supporting Actress**: **Sally Chen — The Ammunition Hunters**	**Best Child Star**: **You Long — The Decisive Battle**
**Best Screenplay**: **Li Han-hsiang — The Story of Ti Ying**	**Best Cinematography - Color**: **Fan Chin-yu — The Story of Ti Ying**
**Best Cinematography - Black-and-White**: **Chi Ho-hsi — The Arch**	**Best Film Editing**: **Kuo Ting-hung — The New One-Armed Swordsman**
**Best Art Direction - Color**: **Liang Ting-hsing — The Story of Ti Ying**	**Best Art Direction - Black-and-White**: **Bao Tian-ming — The Arch**
**Best Music**: **Hsia Tsu-hui — The Story of Ti Ying**	**Best Sound Recording**: **Lin Ting-kuei — The Ammunition Hunters**
**Best Cinematography for Documentary**: **Chi Ho-hsi — Tai Chi**	**Best Planning for Documentary**: **Kao Ching-jen — Youth Holiday 3**
**Special Award for Creativity**: **Tang Shu Shuen — The Arch**	**Special Award - Outstanding Performance**: **Chin Feng — The Silent Love**
**Most Promising Actress**: **Hsu Feng — A City Called Dragon**	**Most Promising Actor**: **Yueh Yang — A Test of Love**
**Technical Award**: Goodbye Darling
