= Wan-chun's Three Loves =

Wan-chun's Three Loves (追尋; "Seek") is a 1964 Taiwanese novelette by Chiung Yao. It was translated to English in 1965 by Tommy Lee.

== English translation ==
- Chiung Yao (May 1965). "Wan-chun's Three Loves". Free China Review. 15 (5). Translated by Tommy Lee.

== Plot ==
The story is set in Beiping (modern Beijing), Republican-era China. The protagonist Wan-chun is a tongyangxi (child bride) who was married into the Chou family when she was 8. Her husband was supposed to be Chou Po-chien, 10 years her senior, but before she reached the age to consummate their marriage the brothers Chou Po-chien, Chou Chung-kang, and Chou Shu-hao all fell in love with her. Unable to choose, Wan-chun attempted suicide, and eventually all three brothers left home for good one by one just as wars and revolutions swept across China. Wan-chun would never have a real husband in her life.

== Adaptations ==
- Four Loves, a 1965 film
- Wan-chun, a 1990 TV series
