= Outside the Window =

Film by Sung Tsun-shou

- Film poster
- Chinese: 窗外
- Hanyu Pinyin: Chuāng Wài
- Directed by: Sung Tsun-Shou
- Screenplay by: Lu Jianye
- Based on: Outside the Window by Chiung Yao
- Produced by: Gu Jiahui
- Starring: Brigitte Lin; Chin Han; Hu Qi
- Cinematography: Chen Jung-Shu
- Edited by: Vincent Leung
- Music by: Joseph Koo
- Production company: Pak Sup Lin Toy Film Co.
- Release date: 24 August 1973 (Hong Kong)
- Running time: 100 minutes
- Country: Taiwan
- Language: Mandarin

Outside the Window is a 1973 Taiwanese romantic drama film directed by Sung Tsun-Shou, based on the novel of the same name by Chiung Yao. It was released in British Hong Kong on 24 August 1973, but due to copyright issues, was not publicly screened in Taiwan until 2009. The film was Brigitte Lin's acting debut.

== Plot ==
Jiang Yanrong, a high school student deprived of parental love, falls in love with her teacher Nan Kang. However, their relationship is not tolerated by society because of their twenty-year age gap and student-teacher relationship. Yanrong is afraid that she will be a burden to Nan, who is the best teacher in the school, and Nan Kang is worried that he may damage Yangrong's reputation. They decide to end their affair despite still being in love.

After Yanrong's graduation, Nan is fired by the school. Yanrong wants to commit suicide but is saved by her mother. She confesses that she still has feeling for Nan Kang and begs her mother to let them marry. To calm her down, her mother pretends to give her permission, but goes to the school to accuse Nan of seducing her daughter, and Nan is fired again. A few years later, Yanrong marries Li Liwei, but is often beaten and humiliated by him. She leaves home to search for Nan, but only finds that his spirit is broken and he has become a dirty old man that she does not recognize.

== Cast ==
- Brigitte Lin as Jiang Yanrong
- Hu Qi as Nan Kang
- Chin Han as Li Liwei
