= Chin Han (actor, born 1946) =

Shanghai-born taiwanese actor

- 秦漢
- Born: Sun Siang-chong; 10 July 1946 (age 80); Shanghai, Republic of China
- Occupation: Actor
- Years active: 1966–present
- Spouse: Shao Chiao-ying (m. 1971; div. 1984)
- Partner: Brigitte Lin (1972–1991)
- Children: Sun Shi Wen (daughter); Richard Sun (son)
- Father: Sun Yuanliang

Chinese name
- Traditional Chinese: 秦漢
- Simplified Chinese: 秦汉
Transcriptions
Standard Mandarin
- Hanyu Pinyin: Qín Hàn

Sun Siang-chong
- Traditional Chinese: 孫祥鐘
- Simplified Chinese: 孙祥钟
Transcriptions
Standard Mandarin
- Hanyu Pinyin: Sūn Xiángzhōng}

Chin Han (秦漢; born 10 July 1946), is a Taiwanese actor whose birth name is Sun Siang-chong (孫祥鐘), and got his first stage name Kang Kai (康凱) from Li Han-hsiang (李翰祥) at the beginning of his acting career. He changed his stage name to Sun Ge (孫戈) during the shooting of Five Brothers from Tangshan (唐山五兄弟; 1972). It was director Yao Feng-Pan (姚鳳磐) who gave him the stage name Chin Han, which he kept ever since. In Chin’s long acting career, he is best known for starring in literary romantic (愛情文藝) films and TV series, adaptations from novels by Qiong Yao (瓊瑤) and other writers in the 1970s and 1980s. With Charlie Chin (秦祥林), Brigitte Lin (林青霞) and Joan Lin (林鳳嬌), the four eventually became known as the "Two Chins and Two Lins" (二秦二林) for their extensive roles in the genre of literary romantic film.

== Life and career ==
Chin’s father is Sun Yuan-liang (孫元良), a general who fought against the Japanese in World War II. Chin completed the training program of CMPC Film Academy (中影訓練班) in 1966 and joined Grand Motion Pictures Co., Ltd. (國聯) as a basic actor. He had to serve in the army after making his first film, Smiles from the Distant Mountains. After completing his military service three years later, Grand Motion Pictures Co., Ltd. was already closed for business. He turned to TTV (台視) to act in a TV drama.

Chin has taken several leading roles as scholarly characters in literary films. In 1973, he had roles in Sung Tsun-shou's (宋存壽) Story of a Mother (母親三十歲) and Outside the Window (窗外). When director Li Hsing (李行) was casting for his adaptation of Qiong Yao's novel The Heart with a Million Knots (心有千千結), he approached Chin for the lead role, but his contract for Sung's Where Have the Lovers (晨星) meant that he had to turn down Li's invitation and go to Hong Kong instead . Li Hsing instead cast Charlie Chin (秦祥林) for his film. Chin Han and Charlie Chin became the two household names for the extremely popular genre of Literary Romantic Films (愛情文藝片), which are mainly adaptations of Qiong Yao's novels. Together with two other female stars of the genre, Brigitte Lin (林青霞) and Joan Lin (林鳳嬌), they are called the “Two Chins and Two Lins” (二秦二林). Li Hsing once jokingly said, "If Chin Han had come to play The Heart with a Million Knots, there would not have been the ‘Two Chins and Two Lins’ later.”

Chin later starred in several films directed by Li Hsing, among them the biographical film adapted from the best-selling autobiography of Zheng Fengxi (鄭豐喜), He Never Gives Up (汪洋中的一條船; 1978), which won him the Best Actor award at the 15th Golden Horse Awards.

After Literary Romantic Films lost its audience in the early 80s, Qiong Yao turned to the small screen of TV to produce popular dramas adapted from her films and novels. In the TV series You Can’t Tell Him (庭院深深), originally a film directed by Sung Tsun-shou in 1971, Chin was paired with Leanne Liu (劉雪華). The series was an instant hit.

Chin has continued to act in the 1990s and afterwards both in films and on TV.

== Personal life ==
Sun married Shao Chiao-ying in 1971 and has a daughter Sun Shi-wen (孫詩雯) and a son Richard Sun (孫國豪). The marriage ended in 1984.

The triangle relationships in life among Chin Han, Brigitte Lin, and Charlie Chin is similar to their relationship in the literary romantic films based on Qiong Yao's novels, such as Cloud of Romance (我是一片雲; 1976). Chin Han and Brigitte Lin were close when making Outside the Window, but due his marriage Chin kept a distance with Lin. After working Lin on Cloud of Romance, Charlie Chin began to passionately pursue Brigitte Lin, who eventually accepted his proposal and was engaged to him in San Francisco in 1980. However, after Chin Han's divorce, Brigitte Lin found that she was still deeply in loved with Chin and chose to break off her engagement with Charlie Chin in 1984, which caused a scandal. They were romantically related again through the help of Qiong Yao, but eventually broke up because Chin Han was unwilling to marry her.

== Filmography ==
=== Film ===
As actor

Year	English Title	Chinese Title	Role	Notes
1966	Smiles from the Distant Mountains	遠山含笑	Zong Qi	
1966	How Many Sunsets	幾度夕陽紅		
1967	Sister's Lover	姐姐的情人	Wah	
1968	A Time for Reunion	春曉人歸時		
1969	Betrayer	殺氣嚴霜		also screenwriter
1971	The Mad Killer	瘋狂殺手		
1972	Everybody Is Laughing	天下一大笑		
1972	Dangerous Game	慾火焚身		
1972	Five Brothers from Tangshan	唐山五兄弟		
1972	Heart Wish	心願		
1973	Outside the Window	窗外	Li Liwei	
1973	Story of Mother	母親三十歲	Zhu Qingmao	
1973	Gui Fen	桂芬		
1974	The House of Love	愛的小屋	Luo Wen	
1974	First Come, First Love	近水樓台	Cai Dawei	
1974	Where the Seagull Flies	海鷗飛處	Ou Shihao	
1974	Spring Comes Not Again	不再有春天	Zhi Cheng	
1974	Sex For Sale	面具	Lin Weibin	
1974	News Hen	女記者	Xue Xiaonan	
1974	Rhythm of the Wave	海韻	Jiang Tao	
1974	Love Camp	愛情集中營		
1975	Girl School	春滿女學府	Lei Guangming	
1975	Hot Wave	熱浪	Ho Ta-fung	
1975	He Loved Once Too Many	水雲	Kiu Yee	
1975	The Unforgettable Character	在水一方	Lu Yu-wen	
1975	Eight Hundred Heroes	八百壯士	Jin Jian	
1975	Land of the Undaunted	吾土吾民	Li Yueh-ting	
1975	Where Have the Lovers Gone	晨星		
1975	A Chilled Spring	春天裡的秋天	Xu Weiming	
1975	Dream Lake	夢之湖		
1975	Posterity and Perplexity	碧雲天	Gao Haotian	
1976	Coffee, Wine, Lemonade	咖啡，美酒，檸檬汁	Lin Fan	
1976	Love Forever	海誓山盟	Xu Changwen	
1976	A Misty Love	小雨絲絲	Pan Jiawang	
1976	Deep Autumn Love	落葉飄飄	Di Chao	
1976	Love in the Twilight Zone	陰陽有情天		
1976	Erotic Nights	色香味		
1976	Painted Waves of Love	浪花	He Zijian	
1976	The Sang Sisters	桑園	Mo Dika	
1976	The Valley of Butterfly	蝴蝶谷	Liu Wenbin	
1976	The Spring Lake	翠湖寒	Hu Weikang	
1976	Wild Pigeons in the Evening	野鴿子的黃昏	Meng Wei	
1977	My Sweet Love	霧濛濛情濛濛	Xiao Zhangyun	
1977	The Love Offensive	愛情大進擊		
1977	My Beloved	雲愛，雲愛	Du Dazhong	
1977	Love in the Shadow	愛有明天	Yi Siyin	
1977	True Love	真真的愛	Xu Dawei	
1977	The Smiling Face	微笑	Chen Yunyang	
1977	The Glory of the Sunset	煙水寒	Ye Yicheng	
1977	Cloud of Romance	我是一片雲	Gu Youlan	
1977	Confused Love	變色的太陽	Hou Shiwen	
1977	Love Rings a Bell	風鈴，風鈴	Wei Dekai	
1977	We Are the Youth	我們是年輕的		
1977	The Lost Dream	荒園草夢	Jiang Xinhan	
1977	Melody from Heaven	白花飄雪花飄	Shao Yulin	
1977	The Love Corridor	愛情走廊	Chu Yun	
1977	We Feel the Wind Again	又是起風時	Xu Kewei	
1978	Morning Fog	晨霧	Tai Yalun	
1978	Wild Flower in the Storm	花非花		
1978	Sea-Wave in Sunset and Love	夕陽浪花愛	Meng Nan	
1978	Love is Burning	愛情火辣辣	Du Ping (Du Ziping)	
1978	Hi, Honey	嗨親愛的	Hao Keai	
1978	The Diary of Di-Di	蒂蒂日記	Fan Xijun	
1978	Love on a Foggy River	煙波江上	Du Xihao	
1978	Lover on the Wave	我踏浪而來	Zhao Darong	
1978	A Journey of Love	無情荒地有情天	Lin Lei	
1978	Ask My Love from God	此情可問天	Chen Yuncheng	
1978	He Never Gives Up	汪洋中的一條船	Zheng Fengxi	
1978	The Story of Green House	綠色山莊	Lei Wen	
1978	Mountains Under the Setting Sun	夕陽山外山	Huang Shaokui	
1978	Love in the Blossoming Mountain Flowers	滿山花開一片情	Xu Guowei	
1979	A Sorrowful Wedding	悲之秋	Du Jiawen	
1979	Love Under a Rosy Sky	彩霞滿天	Chiao Shu-pei	
1979	The Wild Goose on the Wing	雁兒在林梢	Jiang Huai	
1979	Love Seed	一顆紅豆	Liang Zhiwen	
1979	By Love Obsessed	情奔	Zhi Gang	
1979	Dash	衝刺		
1980	My Native Land	原鄉人	Chûng Lî-fò	
1980	Another Spring	又見春天	Yang Wei-han	
1980	Flying Home	雁兒歸	Li Junping	
1980	Poor Chasers	一對傻鳥	Chen Cheng-hsiung	
1980	Lotus Triangle	情網		
1980	Reunion in the Rain	蘭花草	Liang Hanzhong	
1980	The Marigolds	金盞花	Lawyer Zhou	
1980	Flying Rainbow	飛躍的彩虹	Lu Changfeng	
1980	A Girl Who Comes from the Country	我從山中來	Lu Jun	
1980	Love in a Big Land	大地親情		
1980	The Lotus Triangle	荷葉、蓮花、藕	Ye Yi	
1980	Twin Troubles	愛情躲避球	Long Kedong & Long Youdong	
1981	My Cape of Many Dreams	夢的衣裳	Sang Erxuan	
1981	The Land of the Brave	龍的傳人	Lin Chao-hsing	
1981	Love You Till I Die	愛你入骨		
1981	Once Again With Love	又見春天	Yang Weihan	
1981	Coming with a Gun	帶槍過境	Ban Jie	
1981	Clouds, Please Stay	雲且留住	Li Jianwen	
1982	Girls' School	女子學校	Mei Yixin	
1982	The Girl Robber and I	小妞．大盜．我	Fei Shaohua	
1982	Marianna	賓妹		
1982	Pigeons in the Evening	鴿子的黃昏		
1982	The Drug Busters	鐵血勇探	Tang Keyuan	also director
1983	The Lost Generation	風水二十年	Mr. Tsun	
1984	Holy War	聖戰千秋		
1984	Impending War	戰爭前夕		
1985	Last Breath	血染風采		
1986	Loves of a Small Town Doctor	小鎮醫生的愛情	Wang Liyi	
1990	Promising Miss Bowie	祝福	Ko Man-kit	
1990	Red Dust	滾滾紅塵	Chang Neng-tsai	
1991	Center Stage	阮玲玉	Tong Gwai-saan	
1992	Requital	五湖四海	Fan Dai-kuay	
1994	Treasure Hunt	花旗少林	Tong Ling	
1995	Don't Cry, Nanking	南京1937	Shing Yin	
2000	Feeling by Night	夜奔	De shun	
2006	The Knot	雲水謠	Wang Ting-wu	
2012	Threads of Time	柳如是	Qian Qianyi	

As director

- The Drug Busters (鐵血勇探) – also actor

As writer

- Betrayer (殺氣嚴霜) – also actor

=== Television series ===
Year	English title	Chinese title	Role	Notes
1971	Rainbow Bridge	七色橋	Mu Yuande	
1985	How Many Sunsets	幾度夕陽紅	Ho Mu-tien	
1986	Lovers Under the Rain	煙雨濛濛	Ho Shu-huan	
1986	I Am a Chinese	我是中國人		
1987	Deep Garden	庭院深深	Po Pei-wen	
1988	One Side of the Water	在水一方	Chu Shih-yao	remake of The Unforgettable Character
1989	Seagulls Soaring In Iridescent Clouds	海鷗飛處彩雲飛	Yu Muhuai	
1991	Love in Venice	情定威尼斯		
1995	Secular Romance	情愛紅塵	Geng Haoran	
1996	Flowers Gone, Flowers Bloom	花落花開	Xia Haimo	
1997	Flying with the Iridescent Clouds	我伴彩雲飛		
2000	Give Daddy A Kiss	親親老爸	Fang Nien-tsu	
2002	Cash Is King	勝券在握	Qi Ren	
2004	Son From the Past	子是故人來	Seng Ming	
2004	Wealthy Family's Shocking Dream	豪門驚夢	Chiao Cheng-tien	
2005	Purple Jade, Golden Clay	紫玉金砂	Pan Tianci	
2007	Niu Lang and Zhi Nu	牛郎織女	Jade Emperor	
2009	Dragon-Phoenix Luck	龍鳳呈祥	Long Jiandong	
2014	Moment in Peking	新京華煙雲	Yao Siyuan	
2017	The Glory of Tang Dynasty	大唐榮耀	Emperor Xuanzong	
2017	Cambrian Period	寒武紀	Zhan Shili	
2017	Dear My Friends	親愛的她們	Song Shuhao	
2018	Flesh And Spirit	靈與肉	Xu ingyou	
2018	Twenties Once Again	重返20歲	Xiang Dahai	
2020	New World	新世界	Shen Shichang	
2025	Forget You Not	忘了我記得	Cheng Kuang-Chi	

== Awards and honors ==
Year	Awards	Category	Work
1976	22nd Asia Pacific Film Festival	Most Popular Actor	
1978	15th Golden Horse Awards	Best Leading Actor	He Never Gives Up
1979	25th Asia Pacific Film Festival	Best Actor For Tragic Films	He Never Gives Up
