= Rulaizong =

Cult

- Logo of Rulaizong

Total population
- over 90,000 followers (According to its official website)

Founder
- Miaochan

Regions with significant populations
- Taiwan

Religions
- Buddhism (self-claimed)

Scriptures
- Three Holy Teachings, Compassionate Teachings from Miaochan, Dharma's Speeches towards Heredity, Heart Sutra and Diamond Sutra

Website
- www.rulai.org

Rulaizong
- Traditional Chinese: 佛教如來宗
- Simplified Chinese: 佛教如来宗
- Literal meaning: The Tathāgata Sect of Buddhism
Transcriptions
Standard Mandarin
- Hanyu Pinyin: Fójiào Rúláizōng
- Bopomofo: ㄈㄛˊ ㄐㄧㄠˋ ㄖㄨˊ ㄌㄞˊ ㄗㄨㄥ

External images
- Gathering of Rulaizong
- Believers kowtowing Miaochan

Rulaizong (simplified Chinese: 佛教如来宗; traditional Chinese: 佛教如來宗; pinyin: Fójiào Rúláizōng; Zhuyin Fuhao: ㄈㄛˊ ㄐㄧㄠˋ ㄖㄨˊ ㄌㄞˊ ㄗㄨㄥ; literally, The Tathāgata Sect of Buddhism) is a cult originating in Taiwan which was established by Miaochan. It claims itself as a sect of Buddhism. According to the official website of Rulaizong, in 2015, the organization had more than 90,000 followers.

== History ==
Miaochan, whose birth name was Liu Chin-lung (Chinese: 劉錦隆; pinyin: Líu Jǐnlóng), was a stuntman during his youth. He learned qigong during that time and could sit on a bed of nails. Liu married three times and had three children. Peng, his third wife, had the Buddhist name "Miaodianlian" (miao means wonderful, dian means palace, lian means lotus). In 1990, Liu and his wife practiced through Master Wujue Miaotian (real name Huang Ming-liang). Miaotian gave Liu a Buddhist name, "Miaodianming" (ming means understanding).

Liu was involved in a series of lawsuits with Miaotian in the late 1990s. In 1998, Liu accused Miaotian of defrauding consumers in the sale of cubicles for cremation urns. In March 1998, Liu gave himself a Buddhist name, "Xingbenjue" (xing means actions, ben means roots, jue means enlightenment), declared himself a Buddha, and called a press conference to criticize Miaotian. In August of the same year, Liu apologized to Miaotian and was allowed to rejoin Miaotian. In 2004, Liu declared himself a Buddha again and changed his name to Liu Miaoru. Liu claimed he was "Master Miaochan" (which literally means "the wonderful Zen") and established Rulaizong. It was rumored that the reason behind the breakaway from Miaotian was due to the dissatisfaction of Liu towards Miaotian on the selling of his products towards believers. According to the official saying from Rulaizong, Liu became the "Master with Great Achievement" and established Rulaizong in 1998, and officially started to spread his teachings in 2004.

== Doctrines ==
According to the official website of Rulaizong, the belief system uses the works Three Holy Teachings, Compassionate Teachings from Miaochan, Dharma's Speeches towards Heredity, Heart Sutra, and Diamond Sutra as the "most exacted rules of Dzogchen". Of these books, Three Holy Teachings was authored by Miaochan himself. The book states that besides Tathāgata, all things (including things from ten spiritual realms) are empty and are created by Tathāgata.

Rulaizong believes that Miaochan possessed a powerful force to remove believers' bad karma. Rulaizong also states that Miaochan was sent to the Sahā World by Tathāgata, and believers would accept Miaochan when they were enlightened. Miaochan stated that although there were not many believers, their eyes from the sky had seen the spirituality of the three wise men and the three lower realms. Nonetheless, if they did not follow the "Rules of Tathāgata" proposed by Rulaizong, they would not see Tathāgata. Miaochan also stated that if a bodhisattva's reincarnation did not follow Miaochan's practice, he would merely retain his identity as a bodhisattva or even risk lowering his status.

== Activities ==
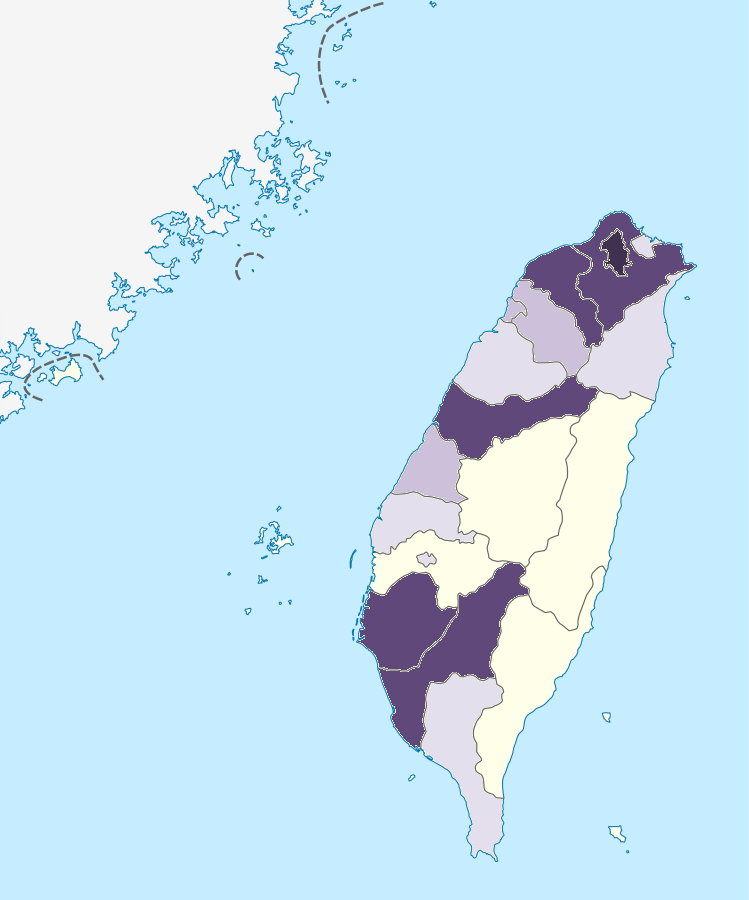
Believers in each special municipality and county in Taiwan More than 8,000 believers 6,001 to 8,000 believers 4,001 to 6,000 believers 2,001 to 4,000 believers 0 to 2,000 believers Not applicable

Rulaizong has 30 monasteries in the northern, middle, and southern parts of Taiwan. Moreover, 101 university clubs related to Rulaizong were established in Taiwan. For example, in the National Taiwan University, the "Buddhism Witness Club", which had the background of Rulaizong, organized band practices, exchanges, and pujas. In 2015, the "Buddhism Witness Club" at the National Taiwan Ocean University was awarded the "Excellent Award in Academic and Art Clubs" by Evaluation of Nationwide University Clubs of Taiwan. These clubs also cooperated with Taiwanese police to organize anti-crime awareness activities.

According to its official website, Rulaizong has 90,000 believers, most of them intelligentsia and their families. More than 8,000 university students are believers of Rulaizong. Some Taiwanese artists, such as Sonia Sui, Yao Yao, Annie Yi, Harlem Yu, Joanne Tseng, and Chiang Shu-na are also believers of Rulaizong. Matthew Lien, a Taiwan-based Canadian artist, composed a song called "All Rise Together" for Rulaizong. When Chiang Shu-na participated in an activity organized by Rulaizong, she was blessed by Miaochan. At that time, her body shook for 20 seconds, sparking discussions in Taiwan’s online community.

A person who is willing to become a believer of Rulaizong must be introduced by a believer in order to enter Rulaizong. A handbook is published for senior believers to answer newcomers' doubts. According to Rulaizong's confidential documents, Rulaizong does not accept critically ill patients and children as believers.

== Controversies ==
According to the Shakyamuni Buddhist Foundation founded by Miaotian, Miaochan cheated his master, destroyed his reputation, and apprenticed privately. Hence, the Foundation gave a verbal warning to Miaochan in 2012. After the incident of Chiang Shu-na in 2014, the Foundation found that Miaochan also used sorcery to cheat people, misled people, and made trouble among believers. Consequently, the Foundation decided to expel Miaochan from Zen. The Foundation also commented on the behavior of Rulaizong believers, stating that their repeated use of the phrase “Thank the Master, Praise the Master” during gatherings to honor Miaochan resembles parroting. The Foundation also stated that the activities of Rulaizong constituted a form of idolatry, violating the concept that all sattvic beings are equal in Buddhism.

Besides its doctrines, Rulaizong has been criticized for attracting believers using a direct marketing approach. Believers of Rulaizong must pay 300 New Taiwan dollars for admission, while students and other believers pay 200 New Taiwan dollars and 2000 New Taiwan dollars for the extra fee each month, respectively. Although the official position is that the extra fee is voluntary, it has led to controversy. Moreover, a bank issued a credit card that frequently deducted an amount of cash to cover the extra fee, and deducted 1% from each transaction to the "Buddhism Witness Association". According to an estimation by the Apple Daily, Rulaizong earned the accumulated revenue of a few billion New Taiwan dollars in 2014.

University clubs affiliated with Rulaizong were also involved in controversies. Some students alleged that these clubs were collecting revenue coercively and using classrooms for promotional activities. Some students from the National Taiwan Normal University said that they had to pay an extra fee of 200 New Taiwan dollars after they attended activities related to Rulaizong. Although the president of the club declined the accusation of charging the extra fee, according to the regulations of university clubs in Taiwan, these clubs were responsible for reporting revenues beyond the standard club fees. The club at the National Taiwan Normal University did not report the additional fees to the university, leading the university to launch an investigation.

After the clip of Chiang Shu-na shaking for 20 seconds during an activity organized by Rulaizong was revealed, the Shakyamuni Buddhist Foundation criticized the behavior, attributing it to a mysterious force that caused believers to act irrationally. A psychologist described Chiang’s behavior as an expression of emotions or hysteria. A religious expert stated that it was unrelated to induction. A qigong expert stated that it was a form of hypnosis achieved through qigong.
