= The Wild Goose on the Wing =

1979 Taiwanese film

Chinese name
- Traditional Chinese: 雁兒在林梢
- Simplified Chinese: 雁儿在林梢
Transcriptions
Standard Mandarin
- Hanyu Pinyin: Yàn er zài lín shāo
- Directed by: Lili Liu
- Screenplay by: Yeh Chao
- Based on: The Wild Goose on the Wing by Chiung Yao
- Produced by: Chiung Yao
- Starring: Brigitte Lin; Chin Han; Tse Ling-ling; Ma Yung-lin
- Distributed by: Super Star (H.K.) Motion Picture Company
- Release date: March 24, 1979
- Country: Taiwan
- Language: Mandarin

Opening title

The Wild Goose on the Wing (Chinese: 雁兒在林梢; pinyin: Yàn'er zài línshāo) is a 1979 Taiwanese romantic drama film directed by Lili Liu and written by Yeh Chao. It was released by Super Star (H.K.) Motion Picture Company, with spoken dialogues in Mandarin. It stars Brigitte Lin, Chin Han, Tse Ling-ling, and Ma Yung-lin.

The Wild Goose on the Wing was produced by Chiung Yao, who wrote the novel of the same name. Chiung's publisher husband, Ping Hsin-tao, was an executive producer on the film.

== Plot ==
With the constant support and encouragement from her late sister Tao Pi-huai and Chiang Huai, who nearly became her brother-in-law, Tao Tan-feng finally completes her drama studies in the United Kingdom and returns home. Through frequent letters, she and Chiang Huai have even developed romantic feelings for each other.

But during a conversation with one of her sister's old friends, a disturbing thought emerges in Tan-feng's mind. Pi-huai may not have died of heart disease as believed, but rather out of despair after Chiang Huai fell in love with another woman. Tan-feng swears to uncover the truth behind her sister's death and take revenge on Chiang Huai.

On one hand, Tan-feng appears cold, elegant, and tragically alluring, drawing Chiang Huai deeper into emotional torment. On the other, she transforms into a passionate and lively young woman to seduce Chiang Huai's beloved younger brother, Chiang Hao, leaving him completely captivated. Thanks to her years of acting training, her performance is flawless, or so she believes.

But unknown to her, the truth is far more complex. Chiang Huai's heart, before ever turning to Tan-feng, had always belonged only to Pi-huai. And the ultimate reason for Pi-huai's tragic death may not lie with Chiang Huai, but with Tan-feng herself.

== Cast ==
- Brigitte Lin as Tao Tan-feng
- Chin Han as Chiang Huai
- Tse Ling-ling as Tao Pi-huai
- Ma Yung-lin as Chiang Hao

== Music ==
Yan er zai lin shao (雁兒在林梢) is a 1979 album by Feng Fei-fei, released by Kolin Records (歌林唱片). It contains three songs that are heard in the film. A few songs, like "Naihe" (奈何), have been covered by other singers, like Teresa Teng, Sylvia Chang, and Faye Wong.

Side A

1. "The Wild Goose in the Forest" (雁兒在林梢 "Yan er zai lin shao") — lyrics by Chiung Yao, composed by Xin Yi (欣逸)
  Main theme song of this film
2. "You Want to Stay Behind" (你可願留下 "Ni ke yuan liuxia") — lyrics by Chiung Yao, composed by Xin Yi
  Also called "Ask the Wild Goose" (問雁兒 "Wen yan er"); sub-theme song of this film
3. "The Grassland Is Green and Greener" (草原青又青 "Caoyuan qing you qing") — written by Wang Zhi Yuan (王智遠)
4. "Dang na qin shengxiang qi" (當那琴聲響起) — lyrics by Chen Xi (晨曦), composed by Gu Yue (古月)
  Sub-theme song of the film Return of Monsoon (一片深情 Yipian shen qing)
5. "Autumn Lake" (秋湖 "Qiu hu") — lyrics by Zhuang Nu (莊奴)
  Mandarin rendition of the Japanese song

Side B

1. "When Does a Person Know" (何時才知道 "Heshi cai zhidao") — written by Jiang Rong Yi (蔣榮伊)
2. "Arriving to Dusk" (又是黃昏到 "You shi huanghun dao") — lyrics by Chiung Yao, composed by Xin Yi
  Sub-theme of this film
3. "If My Heart Speaks..." (心裡想說的話 "Xinli xiang shuo dehua") — lyrics by Chen Xi, composed by Kuranosuke Hamaguchi (浜口庫之助)
  Mandarin rendition of the Japanese song, "Mō koi na no ka" (もう恋なのか), by Akira Nishikino (錦野旦)
4. "Wu se bin fen" (五色繽紛) — written by Yue Xun (岳勳)
5. "Regret Leaving Old Love" (舊情依依 "Jiuqing yiyi") — written by Xiao Yan
6. "Naihe" (奈何) — written by Li Da Tao (李達濤)
