= The Unforgettable Character =

- video cover
- Chinese: 在水一方
- Literal meaning: On One Side of the Water
- Hanyu Pinyin: Zài Shuǐ Yī Fāng
- Directed by: Chang Mei-chun
- Written by: Chiung Yao
- Produced by: Chang Jen-dao
- Starring: Brigitte Lin; Chin Han; Tien Niu; Ku Ming-lun
- Cinematography: Chen Jung-shu
- Music by: Lin Chia-ching
- Production company: United Cine-Production Enterprises
- Release date: 1975
- Running time: 98 minutes
- Country: Taiwan
- Language: Mandarin

The Unforgettable Character (Chinese: 在水一方) is a 1975 Taiwanese romantic drama film directed by Chang Mei-chun and written by Chiung Yao.

== Plot ==
After the death of her parents, Hsiao-shuang begins to live with the Chu family in Taipei, who treat her like their own child. The Chu's oldest child Shih-yao deeply loves her, but being crippled he's hesitant to confess his love. Hsiao-shuang quickly falls in love with the eloquent and charismatic wannabe writer Yu-wen, but their marriage is far from blissful. Yu-wen, an irresponsible dreamer and impractical perfectionist, fails to write anything and frequently vents his frustration on Hsiao-shuang. Hsiao-shuang tries her hardest to support him and the family even during her pregnancy. Shih-yao helps Hsiao-shuang sell her songs, but that further angers Yu-wen, now addicted to gambling. After Yu-wen forcefully grabs a cherished jade from her to gamble away, Hsiao-shuang has a miscarriage and files for divorce. Hoping to encourage him, she still promises him that she will get back with him if he comes back with a finished work. Years later, when news of Yu-wen's terminal illness reaches Hsiao-shuang, she immediately arrives at his place in southern Taiwan only to find him dying with his book already completed. After his death, Shih-yao presents Hsiao-shuang a gift, which turns out to be the jade Yu-wen lost 4 years ago. Hsiao-shuang realizes Shih-yao still loves her after all these years.

== Cast ==
- Brigitte Lin as Tu Hsiao-shuang, a beautiful and musically gifted 18-year-old orphan
- Han Chiang as Chu Chih-chien, a former friend of Hsiao-shuang's late father
- Lu Pi-yun as Chu Chih-chien's kind mother
- Chang Ping-yu as Hsin-pei, Chu Chih-chien's wife
- Ku Ming-lun as Shih-yao, Chu Chih-chien's oldest child, a 29-year-old introverted and passionate television producer
- Chen Lu-shan as Shih-ching, Chu Chih-chien's second child
- Chen Yu-ching as Lee Chien, Shih-ching's husband
- Tien Niu as Shih-hui, Chu Chih-chien's youngest child, an outgoing and enthusiastic 19-year-old student
- Yeh Ming-te as Yu-nung, Shih-hui's boyfriend
- Chin Han as Lu Yu-wen, Yu-nung's pal from the military who aspires to win the Nobel Prize in Literature

== Music ==
Zai shui yifang (在水一方; zài shuǐ yīfāng) is a 1975 Mandarin album, released by Kolin Records (歌林). The songs on A-side are sung by Chiang Lei (江蕾) and those on B-side by Frankie Kao (高凌風).

"Zai shui yifang", sometimes translated "On the Other Side of the Water", and "Ni zenme shuo" (你怎麼說) were later covered by other singers, including Teresa Teng in her 1980 album of a similar name. "Ni zenme shuo" was first sung in 1973 by Zi Yin (紫茵).

Lyrics were written by Chiung Yao, and music was composed by Lin Chia-ching (林家慶), unless otherwise. Only songs that are listed as theme songs and instrumental are heard in the film.

Side A — Chiang Lei (江蕾)
No.	Title	Lyrics	Music	Chinese	Length
1.	"Telling the Last Night's Dream" (Sub-theme)			昨夜夢中相訴; zuóyè mèngzhōng xiāng sù
2.	"Please Calmly Listen to Me" (Sub-theme)			請你靜靜聽我; qǐng nǐ jìngjìng tīng wǒ
3.	"zài shuǐ yīfāng" (Main theme)			在水一方
4.	"Blue Ocean"	Unknown	Unknown	藍色的海洋; lánsè de hǎiyáng
5.	"nǐ zěnme shuō"	Shang Kwan-yue (上官月)	Szu Ma-liang (司馬亮)	你怎麼說
6.	"Telling the Last Night's Dream" (Instrumental)			昨夜夢中相訴

Frankie Kao (高凌風) — Side B
No.	Title	Lyrics	Music	Chinese	Length
1.	"zài shuǐ yīfāng" (Main theme)			在水一方
2.	"Sunset" (Sub-theme)			陽光下; yángguāng xià
3.	"Square Brick Road"	Hsuan Ju (玄瞿)	Shin Yi (欣逸)	方磚路上; fāng zhuān lùshang
4.	"Ocean, Sky, My Heart"	Lin Wen-lung (林文隆)	Lin Wen-lung (林文隆)	大海·天空·我的心; dàhǎi, tiānkōng, wǒ de xīn
5.	"You Take Away My Heart"	Tu Fei (涂非)	Tu Fei (涂非)	你帶走了我的心; nǐ dàizǒu le wǒ de xīn
6.	"zài shuǐ yīfāng" (Instrumental)			在水一方
