= Yuan Jing (writer) =

Chinese writer

- Born: Yuan Xingzhuang (袁行莊); 1914; Beijing, China
- Died: 29 July 1999 (aged 84–85); Tianjin, China
- Occupations: novelist, screenwriter
- Spouses: Kong Jue (孔厥); Lou Ningxian (娄凝先)
- Relatives: Yuan Xiaoyuan, sister; Yuan Xingpei, cousin; Chiung Yao, cousin-niece
- Writing career
- Language: Chinese
- Period: 1940s–1980s
- Notable works: Daughters and Sons (1949, co-authored with Kong Jue)

Yuan Jing
- Traditional Chinese: 袁靜
- Simplified Chinese: 袁静
Transcriptions
Standard Mandarin
- Hanyu Pinyin: Yuán Jìng
- Wade–Giles: Yüan^{2} Ching^{4}

Yuan Jing (1914 – 29 July 1999), born Yuan Xingzhuang, was a Chinese fiction writer, best known for her wartime novel Daughters and Sons (1949, co-authored with her then-husband Kong Jue), which was adapted into a successful 1951 film.

Yuan Jing came from a famous intellectual family. Her sister Yuan Xiaoyuan was China's first female diplomat. Scholar Yuan Xingpei is her cousin. Taiwan-based novelist Chiung Yao is a cousin-niece.

Yuan Jing joined the Chinese Communist Party in 1935 and went to Yan'an during the Second Sino-Japanese War where she began to write in several genres. During the Korean War she went to Korea as a journalist. Attacked during the Cultural Revolution, she resumed her writing in the 1980s, focusing on children's literature.

== Works translated to English ==
Year	Chinese title	Translated English title	Translator(s)
1949	新儿女英雄传 (co-authored with Kong Jue)	Daughters and Sons	Sidney Shapiro
1958	小黑马的故事	The Story of Little Black Horse	Nieh Wen-chuan
