= Hsu Nai-lin =

Taiwanese television host, actor and singer

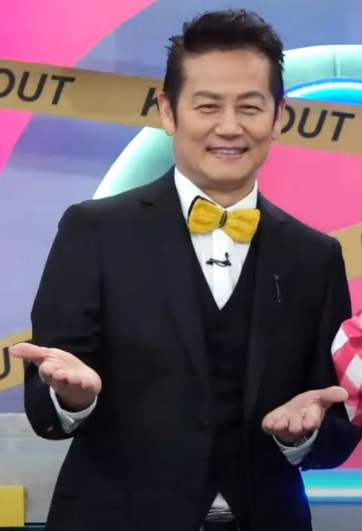
- Hsu in May 2022
- Born: 17 September 1959 (age 66); Dalin, Chiayi County, Taiwan
- Other names: Xu Nailin; Kevin Hsu
- Education: Taipei Physical Education College
- Occupations: Television host, actor, singer
- Years active: 1982-present
- Spouse: Wang Chia-lien (m. 1989)
- Children: 3

Chinese name
- Chinese: 徐乃麟
- Hanyu Pinyin: Xú Nǎilín
- Hokkien POJ: Chhî Nái-lîn

Kevin Hsu Nai-lin (Chinese: 徐乃麟; pinyin: Xú Nǎilín; Pe̍h-ōe-jī: Chhî Nái-lîn; born 17 September 1959) is a Taiwanese television host, actor, and singer.

== Career ==
Hsu has appeared in the TV serials Deep Garden (1987), Wan-chun (1991), Qing qing he bian cao (青青河邊草, 1991), and Reaching for the Stars (2005).

He has hosted numerous TV shows in Taiwan, mainland China, and other regions. With co-host Sam Tseng, he won the Best Host in a Variety Programme Award at the Golden Bell Awards twice, in 2006 and 2014.
