= Sammi Kao =

Taiwanese singer (born 1969)

- Born: 27 January 1969 (age 57); Fengshan, Kaohsiung, Taiwan
- Other name: Malas Kao
- Occupation: Singer
- Years active: 1986–present

Chinese name
- Traditional Chinese: 高勝美
- Simplified Chinese: 高胜美
Transcriptions
Standard Mandarin
- Hanyu Pinyin: Gāo Shèngměi
- Wade–Giles: Kao Sheng-mei
- Musical career
- Genres: Mandopop
- Instrument: Vocals

Sammi Kao (Chinese: 高勝美, Bunun: Malas Kao; born 27 January 1969) is a Taiwanese singer. In 1992, she won the Best Female Mandarin Singer at the 4th Golden Melody Awards for her album Selected Classics 1.

== Early life ==
Kao was born on 27 January 1969 in Fengshan, Kaohsiung, Taiwan. Her father was a member of the special police. She is the youngest of four children. Her family moved around Fengshan until she was 5, when they settled in Gangshan.

After graduating from Kaohsiung Municipal Gangshan Junior High School, she joined her older sister, also a singer, in Taipei to pursue a music career. In 1987, she accompanied a friend to audition for the newly-formed recording company What's Music. The executive noticed her and asked her to audition as well. The company ended up signing her as their first singer.

== Career ==
In 1987, she released her first album Yuan.

In 1988, her album Speak of My Dream gained popularity in both Taiwan and Mainland China. The album Where Seagulls Fly, Colorful Clouds Fly was published in February 1989.

In December 1992, she released a theme song for the TV series New Legend of Madame White Snake, "Waiting For A Thousand Years", which was particularly popular.

In 1992, she won Best Female Mandarin Singer at the 4th Golden Melody Awards for her compilation album Selected Classics 1.

In the late 80s and early 90s, Kao recorded the themes to several TV shows adapted from Chiung Yao's romance novels, such as the song "Where Seagulls Fly, Colorful Clouds Fly." Chiung once asked Kao to play the lead in her show, but she declined by saying "[she's] afraid that acting would distract her from singing at full strength". Since 8 p.m. is a popular prime time block for which she had frequently appeared, she earned the nickname "Eight o'clock Kao".

In June 2005, she held a solo concert in Beijing.

In 2016, she performed at the 51st Golden Bell Awards. Besides singing classic TV show theme songs, she also performed with Kumachan, Bii, and No Solution.

== Personal life ==
Her niece Sharon Kao is an actress.

== Awards and nominations ==
=== Golden Melody Awards ===
Year	Category	Nomination	Result	Ref
1992	Best Female Mandarin Singer	Wangfu Cliff	Nominated	
1993	Best Female Mandarin Singer	Selected Classics 1	Won	
