= Wang Yin (actor) =

Chinese actor and director from Hong Kong

- (Chinese: 王引)
- Born: Wang Chunyuan (Chinese: 王春元); 1901; Shanghai, China
- Died: 1988 (aged 86–87)
- Occupations: Actor; director
- Spouse: Yuen Mei-Wan

Wang Yin (Chinese: 王引; 1901–1988) was a Chinese actor and director from Hong Kong. Wang won the Golden Horse Award for Best Leading Actor twice, in 1962 and 1971.

== Early life ==
On June 25, 1901, Wang was born as Wang Chunyuan (Chinese: 王春元) in Shanghai, China. Wang's ancestral home was in Tianjin.

== Career ==
Wang began his acting career with Jinan Film Company, appearing in his first film as an actor in 1929. In 1931, Wang became a director and directed his first film. From 1932 to 1940, Wang worked for several film studios, among them Yihua, Lianhua, Mingxing, and Xinhua. During the Japanese occupation of Shanghai, he continued acting in what became known as Solitary Island. In 1947, Wang founded Liangyou Film Company in Hong Kong. He joined the Shaw Brothers Studio in 1950, and worked there for ten years. He remained active until the late 1970s.

== Filmography ==
=== Films ===
This is a partial list of films.

- 1932 The Stone - also as Director
- 1939 Desperado (Chinese: 亡命之徒) - also as Writer and Director
- 1940 The Love of a Woman (Chinese: 潘巧雲) - also as Director
- 1954 Girl on the Loose - Director; with Li Li-hua in the main role
- 1969 Steal Emperor's Crown - Director

== Personal life ==
On April 13, 1947, Wang moved to Hong Kong. Wang's wife was Yuen Mei-Wan. In 1988, Wang died.
