= Yuan Xingpei =

Chinese academic

- Born: April 18, 1936 (age 89); Jinan, Shandong, China
- Education: Peking University
- Known for: Six Dynasties poetry, Tang poetry
- Scientific career
- Institutions: Peking University

Yuan Xingpei
- Chinese: 袁行霈
Transcriptions
Standard Mandarin
- Hanyu Pinyin: Yuán Xíngpèi
- Wade–Giles: Yüan^{2} Hsing^{2}-p'ei^{4}
- IPA: [ɥɛ̌n ɕǐŋ.pʰêɪ]

Yuan Xingpei ([ɥɛ̌n ɕǐŋ.pʰêɪ]; Chinese: 袁行霈; born April 18, 1936) is a Chinese scholar, educator, author, and political leader, known for his public service and publications on Chinese literature, particularly for his studies of Six Dynasties period poet Tao Yuanming. Yuan has been a professor of Chinese literature at Peking University since 1957.

== Life and career ==
Yuan was born in 1936 in Jinan. He attended Peking University as an undergraduate student, graduating in 1957 from the school's Department of Chinese Language and Literature with a B.A. degree. The department hired him as an instructor immediately following his graduation, where he has remained ever since.

In addition to his teaching and publications on Chinese literature, Yuan has served in various areas of Chinese politics. Yuan has been a member of the China Democratic League since 1987, and has served as its vice-chairman since 1997. He served on the Chinese People's Political Consultative Conference from 1998 to 2003.

== Selected works ==
- (in Mandarin Chinese) Yuan, Xingpei, ed.-in-chief (1963). Wei-Jin Nanbeichao wenxue shi cankao ziliao 魏晋南北朝文学史参考资料 [Wei, Jin, Southern and Northern Dynasties Literary History Reference Materials]. Beijing: Zhonghua shuju.
- (in Mandarin Chinese) — — — and Hou Zhongyi 侯中义 (1981). Zhongguo wenyan xiaoshuo shumu 中国文言小说书目 [Index of Classical Chinese Fiction]. Beijing: Beijing daxue chubanshe.
- (in Mandarin Chinese) — — — (1987). Zhongguo shige yishu yanjiu 中国诗歌艺术研究 [Studies on the Artistics of Chinese Poetry]. Beijing: Beijing daxue chubanshe; revised edition (1996).
- (in Mandarin Chinese) — — — (1997). Tao Yuanming yanjiu 陶渊明研究 [Studies on Tao Yuanming]. Beijing: Beijing daxue chubanshe.
- (in Mandarin Chinese) — — —, ed.-in-chief (1999). Zhongguo wenxue shi 中国文学史 [History of Chinese Literature], 4 vols. Beijing: Gaodeng jiaoyu chubanshe.
- (in Mandarin Chinese) — — —, et al., eds.-in chief (2006). Zhongguo wenming shi 中国文明史 [History of Chinese Civilization], 4 vols. Beijing: Beijing daxue chubanshe. English edition (2012), English text edited by David R. Knechtges, The History of Chinese Civilization, 4 vols. Cambridge: Cambridge University Press. ISBN 978-1107013094
