= Deep Garden =

- DVD cover
- Also known as: Deep Courtyard
- Simplified Chinese: 庭院深深
- Hanyu Pinyin: Tíng Yuàn Shēn Shēn
- Created by: Chiung Yao
- Screenplay by: Lin Chiu-yu
- Directed by: Liu Li-li
- Starring: Leanne Liu; Chin Han; Lee Li-feng; Fan Hung-hsuan; Ku Yin; Chao Yung-hsin; Lin Tzay-peir
- Country of origin: Taiwan
- Original language: Mandarin
- No. of episodes: 40

Production
- Producer: Ping Hsin-tao
- Running time: 45 minutes

Original release
- Network: Chinese Television System
- Release: May 4, 1987

Deep Garden is a 1987 Taiwanese mystery TV drama series based on romance novelist Chiung Yao's 1969 novel. The series was produced by Chiung Yao's husband Ping Hsin-tao and first shown on Chinese Television System. The title is taken from an 11th-century poem by Ouyang Xiu, which happens to be the favorite line of the mysterious female protagonist.

This series was one of the biggest hits in 1980s Taiwan. In Hong Kong it was broadcast on Asia Television. In Singapore it was shown on Singapore Broadcasting Corporation. In Vietnam it was shown as Xóm vắng ("Deserted Hamlet").

== Cast ==
- Leanne Liu as Fang Ssu-ying (real identity: Chang Han-yen), Ting-ting's mother
- Chin Han as Po Pei-wen
- Ku Yin as Ou Ai-ling, Po Pei-wen's wife
- Yu Chen-hua as Ting-ting, Po Pei-wen's daughter
- Chao Yung-hsin as Yu Tsui-shan
- Lee Li-feng as Po Pei-wen's mother
- Lee Tien-chu as Ou Kuan-chung, Ou Ai-ling's brother
- Sun Shu-fen as Ya-chu
- Hsu Wen-chuan as Mr. You
- Chang Pao-shan as Mr. Chang
- Wang Li as Tsai-feng
- Lin Tzay-peir as Chien Fei-fan (real identity: Po Pei-te), Po Pei-wen's half-brother
- Wen Chieh as Chien Meng-ko
- Hsu Nai-lin as Cheng Ya-li
- Chu Huei-chen as Yeh Shuang
- Fan Hung-hsuan as Kao Li-te
- Sung Yi-fang as Lee Yu-sheng
- Jin Chao-chun as Po Yun-sheng, Po Pei-wen's father (flashback)
- Liu Fang-ying as Chu Chiu-ho, Chien Fei-fan's mother (flashback)
- Feng Hai as Chien Ming-yuan, Chien Fei-fan's adoptive father (flashback)
- Lee Yu-lin as Hsia Yun-lung (flashback)
- Yu Heng as Hsia Chin-hui, Hsia Yun-lung's father (flashback)
- Ma Huei-chen as Lee Chun-man, Hsia Yun-lung's mother (flashback)
- Ma Wei-hsun as Tsai Chin-hua (flashback)
- Yang Wen-yu as Yen Li-li (flashback)

== Awards and nominations ==
- 1988 Golden Bell Awards
  - Won—Best Actress (Ku Yin)
  - Nominated—Best TV Series
  - Nominated—Best Writing (Chiung Yao and Lin Chiu-yu)
  - Nominated—Best Actress (Leanne Liu)
  - Nominated—Best Actor (Chin Han)
