= Leanne Liu =

Hong Kong actress

Leanne Liu Hsueh-hua
- 劉雪華
- Other name: Lau Suet Wah
- Occupation: Actress
- Years active: 1978–present
- Spouse: Teng Yu-kun (m. 1999; died 2011)
- Awards: Golden Bell Awards – Best Actress in a TV Series; 1992 Bedside Love Story: Love in the Wind

Chinese name
- Traditional Chinese: 劉雪華
- Simplified Chinese: 刘雪华
Transcriptions
Standard Mandarin
- Hanyu Pinyin: Liú Xuěhuá
Yue: Cantonese
- Jyutping: Lau^{4} Syut^{3} Waa^{4}

Liu Sue-Hua, also known as Leanne Liu, is a Golden Bell Award-winning Hong Kong actress.

She first starred in Shaw Brothers films in Hong Kong, but moved to Taiwan in the 1980s to focus on her television career. She is particularly famous for appearing in many television adaptations of Chiung Yao's novels. She is still active in Mainland Chinese series and is one of the highest paid television actresses there.

== Filmography ==
=== Films ===
Year	English title	Chinese title	Role	Notes
1978	Young and Lovable	情不自禁		
1979	Affairs	冤家		
1979	The Almighty Extra	通天臨記		
1980	Innocence	情劫		
1980	White Hair Devil Lady	白髮魔女傳		
1982	Hell Has No Boundary	魔界		
1983	Hong Kong Playboys	花心大少		
1983	The Lady Assassin	清宮啟示錄		
1983	Little Dragon Maiden	楊過與小龍女	Huang Rong	
1983	Bastard Swordsman	天蠶變		
1983	Holy Flame of the Martial World	武林聖火令		
1983	Usurpers of Emperor's Power	封神劫		
1984	The Little Cute Fellow	男女方程式		
1984	Return of the Bastard Swordsman	布衣神相		
1984	Opium and the Kung-Fu Master	洪拳大師	Xiao Cui	
1984	The Hidden Power of the Dragon Sabre	魔殿屠龍	Zhou Zhiruo	
1985	My Mind, Your Body	錯體人		

=== Television ===
Year	English title	Chinese title	Role	Notes
1981	The Three Musketeers	妙手神偷		
1983	The Smiling, Proud Wanderer	笑傲江湖	Ren Yingying	
1984	Young Empress Dowager	少女慈禧	Empress Dowager Cixi	
1986	Lovers Under the Rain	煙雨濛濛	Lu Yi-ping	
1986	Many Enchanting Nights	幾度夕陽紅	Li Meng Chu	
1988	One Side of the Water	在水一方	Tu Hsiao-shuang	
1991	Bedside Love Story: Love in the Wind	床邊愛情故事：風裡的愛	Yu Nina	Won—Golden Bell Award for Best Actress in a TV Series
1992	The Book and the Sword	書劍恩仇錄	Huoqingtong	
	Green Green Grass By The River	青青河边草	Zhu Shulan	
1993	Justice Pao	包青天	Qin Xianglian & Huo Qiuniang	
1994	Heavenly Ghost Catcher 2	天師鍾馗II		
1995	Princess Moon	新月格格	Empress Dowager Xiaozhuang	
1998	Thunderstorm Rider	霹靂菩薩		
1999	Hero of the Times	新方世玉	Miao Cuihua	
2000	Princess Jade	懷玉公主	Empress Dowager Xiaozhuang	
2000	State of Divinity	笑傲江湖	Dongfang Bubai	
2003	The Pawnshop No. 8	第8號當舖		
2005	The Palm of Ru Lai	新如来神掌		
2006	Emerald on the Roof	屋頂上的綠寶石		
2008	Romantic Red Rouge	胭脂雪		
2007	Pearl Love	還君明珠		
2011	Qin Xianglian	秦香莲	Chen Shimei's mother	
2011	Palace	宮鎖心玉	Consort De	
2011	New My Fair Princess	新環珠格格	Empress Xiaoshengxian	
2012	The Legend of Zhen Huan	後宮甄嬛傳	Empress Dowager Renshou	
2012	Palace II	宮鎖珠簾	Consort De	
2013	Legend of Lu Zhen	陆贞传奇	Luo Zhaojun	
2016	The Princess Weiyoung	锦绣未央	Feng Xin'er's grandmother	
