= Frankie Kao =

Taiwanese singer and actor (1950–2014)

Frankie Kao Ling-feng
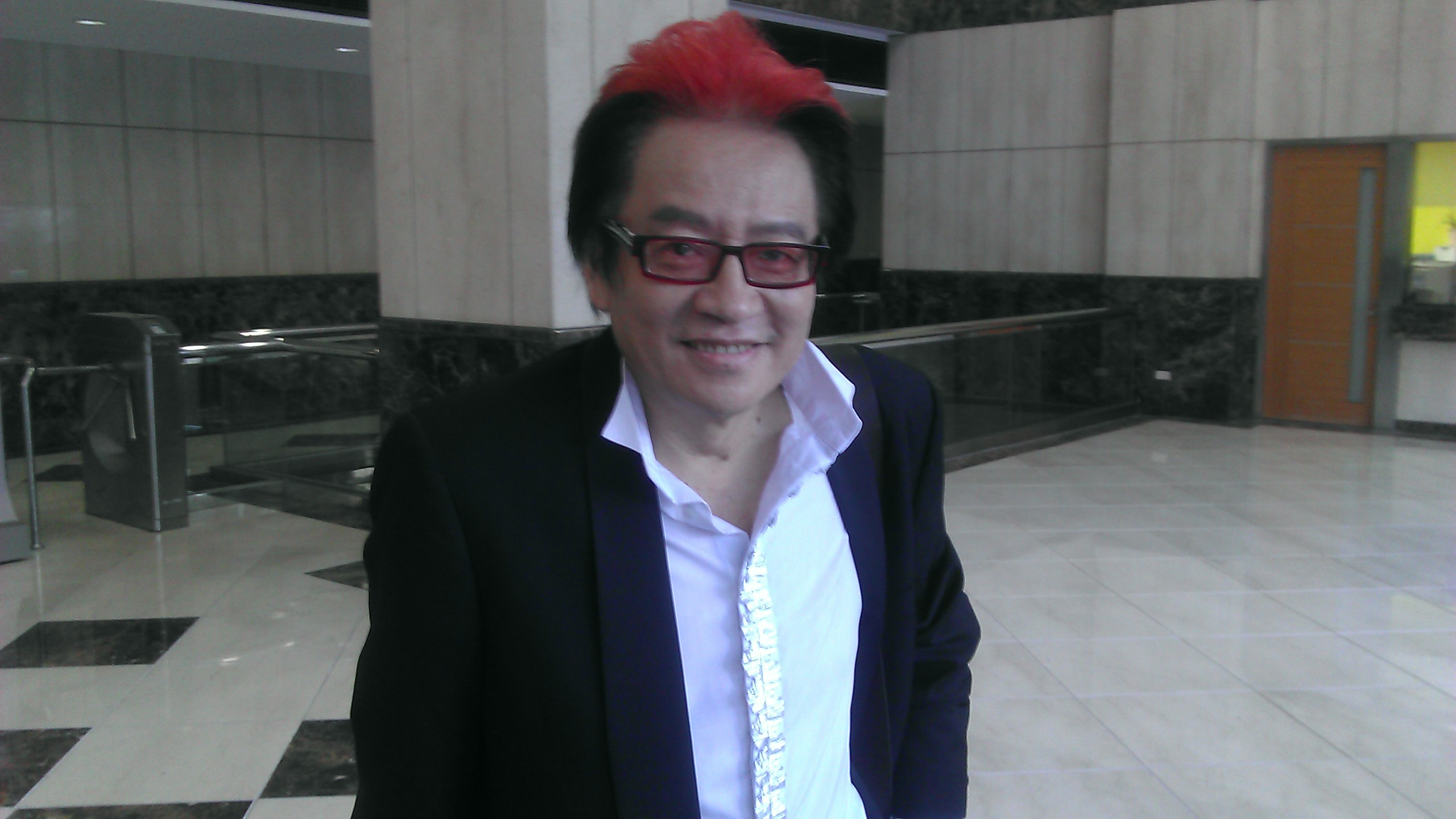
- Kao in 2012
- Born: Ko Yuan-cheng (葛元誠); 28 February 1950; Kaohsiung, Taiwan Province, Taiwan
- Died: 17 February 2014 (aged 63); New Taipei City, Taiwan
- Occupations: Singer; TV host; actor
- Years active: 1974–1989, 2004–2014
- Spouses: Lin Yu-chao (m. 1976; div. 1986); Wen Chieh (m. 1988; div. 1991); Jin You-jhuang (m. 1995; div. 2012)
- Children: 6, including Christine Ko

Chinese name
- Traditional Chinese: 高凌風
- Simplified Chinese: 高凌风
Transcriptions
Standard Mandarin
- Hanyu Pinyin: Gāo Língfēng
Southern Min
- Hokkien POJ: Ko Lêng-hong
- Musical career
- Also known as: The Frog Prince
- Instrument: Vocals

Ko Yuan-cheng (28 February 1950 – 17 February 2014), better known by his stage names Frankie Kao and Kao Ling-feng, was a Taiwanese singer, television presenter, and actor born to Vietnamese parents of Chinese descent. His birth name was 葛元誠 (Pe̍h-ōe-jī: Kat Goân-sêng; pinyin: Gé Yuánchéng), and he employed the moniker the Frog Prince (青蛙王子; Pe̍h-ōe-jī: Chheng-oa Ông-chú; pinyin: Qīngwā Wángzǐ), which was given to him by his close friend, comedian Ni Min-jan.

Kao died of leukemia on 17 February 2014, at the age of 63.

== Selected filmography ==
=== Film ===
List of film appearances, with year, title, and role shown
Year	English title	Chinese title	Role	Notes
1979	The Wild Goose on the Wing	雁兒在林梢		
1983	Fantasy Mission Force	迷你特攻隊	Grease Lightning	
2010	Au Revoir Taipei	一頁台北	Bao Ge	

=== Television ===
List of television appearances, with year, title, and role shown
Year	English title	Chinese title	Role	Notes
2011	iPartment	爱情公寓	Himself	
