= Ping Hsin-tao =

Taiwanese publisher and producer (1927–2019)

- 平鑫濤
- Born: 1927; Shanghai, Republic of China
- Died: 23 May 2019 (aged 91–92); Taiwan
- Other name: Ping Xintao
- Education: Utopia University
- Occupations: Publisher, producer
- Employer: Crown Publishing
- Spouses: Lin Wan-zhen; Chiung Yao (m. 1979–2019)
- Children: Three, including Ping Yun

Chinese name
- Traditional Chinese: 平鑫濤
- Simplified Chinese: 平鑫涛
Transcriptions
Standard Mandarin
- Hanyu Pinyin: Píng Xīntāo
- Wade–Giles: P'ing Hsin-t'ao

Ping Hsin-tao or Ping Xintao (Chinese: 平鑫濤; 1927 – 23 May 2019) was a Taiwanese publisher and producer. He founded Crown Magazine and Crown Publishing in 1954, which launched the careers of Chiung Yao and San Mao, two of Taiwan's most famous authors. He married Chiung Yao and produced films and television series based on her popular romance novels.

== Early life ==
Ping was born in Shanghai, Republic of China, in 1927, with his ancestral home in Changshu, Jiangsu. Despite his interests in literature and art since childhood, he studied accounting at Utopia University at the request of his father.

== Career ==
After graduating from university, Ping moved to Taiwan in 1949 when the Communists took over mainland China, and worked for Taiwan Fertilizer. In 1954, he founded Crown Magazine (皇冠雜誌) and Crown Publishing (皇冠出版社), later known as Crown Culture (皇冠文化). To help cover business expenses, he translated English-language novels into Chinese under the pen name Fei Li (費禮), and worked as a disk jockey at a radio station for five years.

In June 1963, Ping became editor of Lianfu, the influential literary supplement of the United Daily News, and held the position until 1976. Unlike his predecessor Lin Haiyin who focused on elitist "pure literature", Ping promoted writers of more commercial literature, notably the romance novelist Chiung Yao. He serialized Chiung Yao's novels in Crown Magazine before publishing them at Crown Publishing as monographs. He and Chiung Yao adapted many of her novels into television series and films, often serving as producers or screenwriters themselves. Chiung Yao became enormously popular throughout the Chinese-speaking world. San Mao, another Taiwanese writer whose influence and popularity rivalled Chiung Yao's, was also made famous by Ping's Crown Publishing and Crown Magazine.

Throughout his career, Ping published more than 6,000 books and 784 magazine issues. He also produced sixteen films.

== Personal life ==
Ping's first wife was the painter Lin Wan-zhen. They met when Lin was 19, and married when she was 25. They had three children. Their son, Ping Yun, later succeeded him as head of Crown Publishing.

Ping married Chiung Yao in 1979, after an acrimonious divorce with Lin which lasted eight years. In 2018, Lin published a memoir in which she accused Chiung Yao of breaking up her marriage.

After Ping suffered a stroke in 2016 and lost nearly all ability to communicate, his children had a falling out with their stepmother, Chiung Yao, over whether to continue his intubation. Ping died on 23 May 2019, at the age of 92.
