= Chiung Yao =

Taiwanese writer (1938–2024)

Chen Che
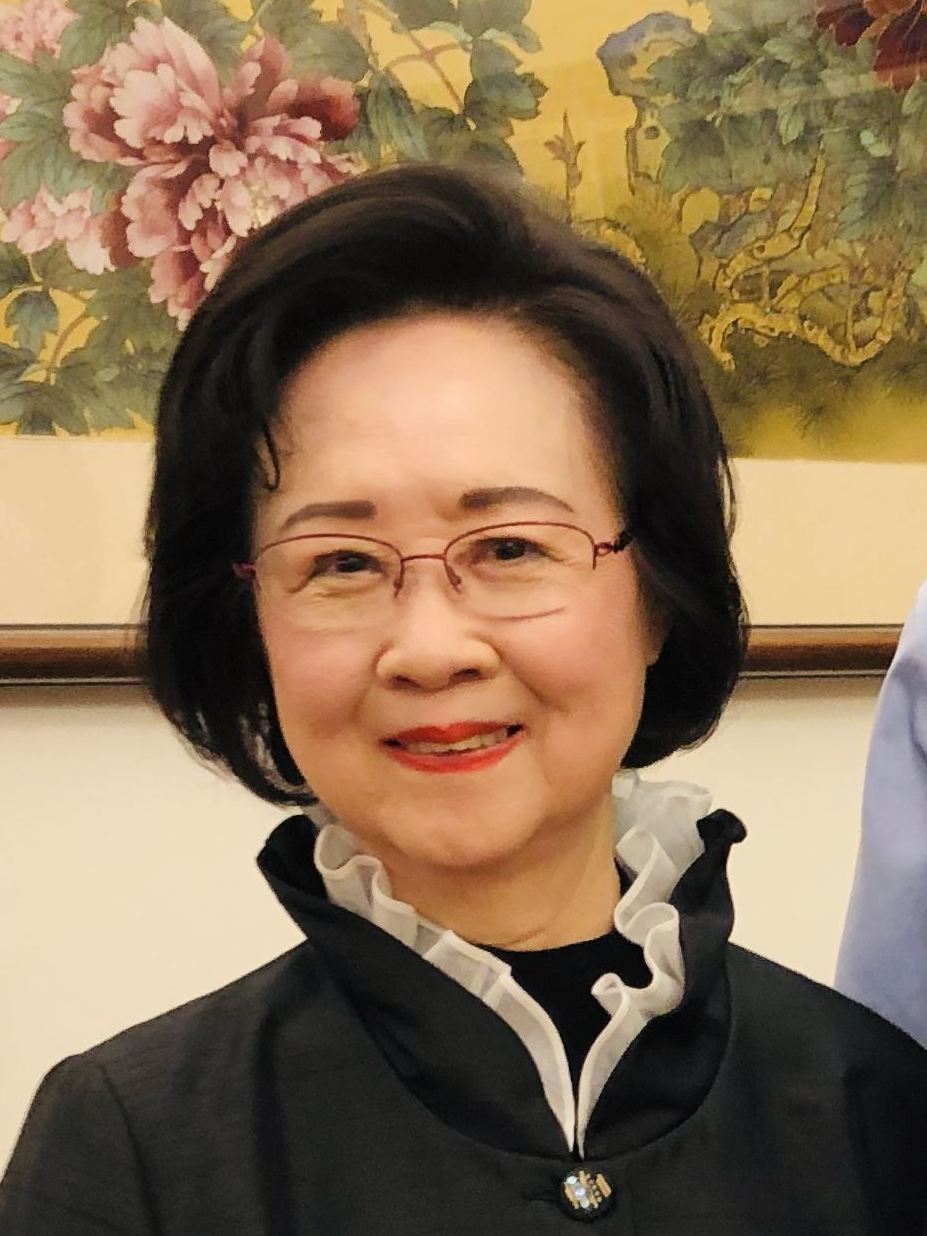
- Yao in 2019
- Born: 20 April 1938; Chengdu, Sichuan, China
- Died: 4 December 2024 (aged 86); Tamsui, New Taipei, Taiwan
- Education: Taipei Municipal Zhongshan Girls High School
- Occupations: Novelist; screenwriter; lyricist; producer
- Spouses: Ma Sen-ching (m. 1959; div. 1964); Ping Hsin-tao (m. 1979; died 2019)
- Children: 4
- Writing career
- Pen name: Chiung Yao (瓊瑤); Xin Ru (心如); Lü Gui (呂圭)
- Language: Chinese
- Period: 1962–2024
- Subject: Romance
- Notable works: Outside the Window; Fire and Rain (1964 novel); My Fair Princess (1998–99 TV series)

Chinese name
- Traditional Chinese: 瓊瑤
- Simplified Chinese: 琼瑶
Transcriptions
Standard Mandarin
- Hanyu Pinyin: Qióng Yáo
- Wade–Giles: Ch'iung^{2} Yao^{2}

Chen Che
- Traditional Chinese: 陳喆
- Simplified Chinese: 陈喆
Transcriptions
Standard Mandarin
- Hanyu Pinyin: Chén Zhé
- Wade–Giles: Ch'ên^{2} Chê^{2}

Chen Che (Chinese: 陳喆; 20 April 1938 – 4 December 2024), better known by her pen name Chiung Yao, was a Taiwanese writer and producer. The name Chiung Yao is taken from the Classic of Poetry, where it means "splendid pure jade". Born in Chengdu, Sichuan, she moved to Taiwan with her family in 1949 during the Chinese civil war.

A leading figure in Chinese romance novels, she rose to fame with Outside the Window (1963), which led to her association with Ping Hsin-tao, owner of the Crown magazine. The two later married and co-founded production companies to adapt Chiung Yao's works for the screen, pioneering cross-strait collaboration in television and film. Her works achieved enormous popularity across the Chinese-speaking world and Southeast Asia in the late 20th century, launching the careers of many actors, with My Fair Princess ranking among the most-watched Chinese television dramas of all time.

== Early life and education ==
Chen Che was born in Chengdu, China, on 20 April 1938. She experienced an unstable childhood due to the Second Sino-Japanese War. Her father, Chen Chih-ping, came from a humble background in Hengyang, while her mother, Yuan Hsing-shu, belonged to an upper-class family with roots in Suzhou and Shanghai; her grandfather was the head of the Bank of Communications. Yuan fell in love with Chen Chih-ping, who was her Chinese teacher, and the two defied social norms and married. When Yuan Hsing-shu became pregnant, Chen Chih-ping, then only 20 years old, initially planned to have the pregnancy terminated. However, upon discovering she was carrying twins—a boy and a girl—he changed his mind and decided to raise the children. The girl was Chiung Yao. During the war, the family endured a turbulent life as refugees. To survive, they performed in plays and sold potatoes, while Chen Chih-ping and Yuan Hsing-shu also taught in various locations, including Guizhou and Sichuan.

With both parents being Chinese literature teachers, the literary atmosphere of her family instilled in her a love for literature from a young age. In 1947, she moved with her family to Shanghai, where she published her first short story, The Poor Little Qing, on the Ta Kung Pao. In 1949, her family relocated to Taipei, Taiwan. After arriving in Taiwan, her father became a Chinese literature professor at National Taiwan Normal University, while her mother worked as a Chinese literature teacher at Taipei Municipal Chien Kuo High School. Compared to many of her peers who grew up in post-war Taiwan's poverty, Chiung Yao enjoyed a relatively privileged upbringing. At the age of 14, she published a short story under the pen name Lü Gui. In 1954, she adopted the pen name Xin Ru and published another story.

Chiung Yao struggled academically as a child, often facing criticism from her parents. In her final year of high school, she fell in love with her Chinese literature teacher, Jiang Ren, who was single and much older than her. The two planned to marry after being admitted to university, but their relationship ended due to opposition from her parents. Ultimately, Chiung Yao did not pass the university entrance exams, and graduated from Taipei Municipal Second Girls' High School (now Taipei Municipal Zhongshan Girls High School).

In 1959, she married Ma Sen-ching, a graduate of the Foreign Languages Department at National Taiwan University. Ma worked at Taiwan Aluminium Corporation in Kaohsiung, where the couple settled after their wedding. In addition to his day job, Ma was a part-time writer. The couple had one son, Chen Chung-wei.

== Career (1964–2013) ==
=== Novelist ===
In 1962, Chiung Yao published several short and medium-length stories in Crown magazine. She then rewrote her high school teacher-student romance into the novel Outside the Window. Initially rejected by multiple publishers due to its length, it was eventually accepted for publication by Ping Hsin-tao's Crown magazine.

In July 1963, Chiung Yao's semi-autobiographical love story Outside the Window was serialised in Crown magazine, achieving significant success. It was later released as a standalone book. This success led to her acquaintance with Ping Hsin-tao. Ping rented a flat opposite his own for Chiung Yao and hired domestic carers, allowing her to focus on writing full-time. As a result, Chiung Yao moved from Kaohsiung to Taipei with her child. Ping's wife, Lin Wan-chen, began to suspect an unusual relationship between Chiung Yao and Ping after their young children told Lin of their conversations.

Chiung Yao's husband, Ma Sen-ching, was deeply humiliated by the public disclosure of her first love and attacked her in newspapers. Their relationship gradually deteriorated. Writer Chi-chi recalled an incident where she visited Chiung Yao's home, and a servant opened the door to find Chiung Yao coming downstairs with bed linens, claiming they were "poisoned" and announcing her intent to divorce Ma Sen-ching. The couple officially divorced in 1964. After the divorce, Chiung Yao and Ping Hsin-tao entered into a romantic relationship. They became a couple on the premiere night of Outside the Window film adaptation, with Chiung Yao becoming Ping's mistress.

Due to the hardships in her personal life, Chiung Yao's early works often had tragic endings. Between 1964 and 1971, her short and medium-length stories explored varied styles. After 1964, Chiung Yao published six bestsellers, including Fire and Rain, Six Dreams, and Many Enchanting Nights.

=== Film producer ===
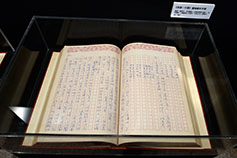
Golden Horse Awards 50th Anniversary Exhibition showing Chiung Yao's manuscript I am a Cloud.

Between 1964 and 1983, Chiung Yao's works were adapted into 50 films, leading to "Chiung Yao film" becoming a genre in and of itself. Chiung Yao's novels and their adaptations sparked a "Chiung Yao fever" in Hong Kong and Taiwan.

==== Authorised adaptations ====
In 1965, Taiwanese director Li Hsing adapted two stories from Chiung Yao's Six Dreams into films: Four Loves and The Silent Wife. These marked the beginning of cinematic adaptations of Chiung Yao's works. Four Loves was successful both critically and commercially, while The Silent Wife achieved even greater success, becoming a bestseller in Hong Kong. However, Chiung Yao was occasionally dissatisfied with Li Hsing's adaptations. For example, in The Silent Wife, Chiung Yao envisioned the heroine as a "child bride", but Li Hsing insisted on portraying her as a cousin, deviating from the original narrative.

Shaw Brothers Studio in Hong Kong purchased the film rights to her works. Among these, My Dream Boat became the second-highest-grossing Mandarin-language film in Hong Kong that year. After leaving Shaw Brothers, Hong Kong director Li Han-hsiang founded Grand Motion Pictures in Taiwan, where he extensively adapted Chiung Yao's novels for the screen. His film Many Enchanting Nights earned actress Chiang Ching the Golden Horse Award for Best Actress for her role as the protagonist.

In the mid-1970s, Li Hsing returned to Chiung Yao's works, adapting The Young Ones and The Heart has a Million Knots. These films boosted the popularity of actors Chen Chen and Charlie Chin, who starred in The Young Ones. The soundtrack also gained widespread recognition, with Teresa Teng's renditions of A Thousand Words and How Can I Leave You from the film becoming major hits. Brigitte Lin, who had failed her university entrance exams, was discovered by director Sung Tsun-Shou from the Outside the Window production team. This marked her entry into the entertainment industry. However, due to copyright disputes, the film was ultimately unable to be released in Taiwan.

==== Superstar Motion Picture ====
Unsatisfied with Shaw Brothers' adaptation of The Purple Shell, Chiung Yao established Firebird Picture Company in 1966, producing Mist Over Dream Lake and Lucky Clover. However, due to poor box office performance, the company closed in 1971. In 1976, Ping Hsin-tao asked his wife Lin Wan-chen for a divorce. That same year, Chiung Yao co-founded Superstar Motion Picture to adapt her novels into films, ending her collaboration with Li Hsing in 1977.

In 1979, Jiang Ren, the inspiration for the male lead in Outside the Window, died, and Chiung Yao married Ping. Chiung Yao and her second husband Ping adapted many of her novels into television series and films, often serving as producers or screenwriters themselves. Film adaptations in the 1970s often featured Brigitte Lin, Joan Lin, Charlie Chin, and Chin Han, who were then collectively known as the "Two Lins and Two Chins".

At Superstar, Brigitte Lin became Chiung Yao's go-to actress, starring in many of Chiung Yao's films. Early works such as Cloud of Romance and The Love Affair of Rainbow were scripted by Chang Yung-hsiang, while later works, including Moonlight Serenade and Yesterday's Love, were penned by Chiung Yao herself. Cloud of Romance, featuring Brigitte Lin and co-stars Charlie Chin and Chin Han, was a major hit, with the title song sung by Fong Fei-fei gaining widespread popularity.

Chiung Yao films dominated prime slots during Lunar New Year and Youth Day. Songs were often performed by Fong Fei-fei, with music composed by Tso Hung-yuan. The films, set in dining rooms and cafes, were nicknamed "Three-Hall Films". However, their formulaic nature led to diminishing appeal. After the 1982 failure of Amid the Rolling Clouds, Chiung Yao announced her retirement from filmmaking.

=== Television producer ===
==== Adaptations of earlier works ====
Chiung Yao stopped creating film adaptations in 1980, choosing instead to focus on television. From 1982 to 1985, Chiung Yao's writing began to address controversial societal issues, producing works such as Paradise on Fire. However, after 1985, she experienced a creative bottleneck and paused her writing until the 1990s. In 1985, Chiung Yao's novels began to be adapted into television dramas. The following year, Chiung Yao and her husband Ping Hsin-tao co-founded Yi Ren Communications. By 1990, four more adaptations were released within a single year. Most of these dramas aired during Taiwan's prime-time evening slots, drawing massive viewership.

==== Romantic melodrama ====
After Taiwan's lifting of martial law, the society's growing openness and diversity of values led to the decline of the "fighting for love" trope in Chiung Yao's works. Consequently, her stories shifted to settings in late Qing and early Republican China, focusing on themes like class conflict and feudal restrictions rather than generational gaps or romantic disputes. Her works during this period emphasised "love above all" and featured intense melodrama. The female protagonists—dubbed "Chiung Yao Girls"—embodied the image of tragic beauty. While her narratives critiqued feudal patriarchal oppression, they simultaneously portrayed enduring hardship and framed marriage as the ultimate victory.

In 1987, following Taiwan's approval for citizens to visit relatives in China, Chiung Yao travelled there. After Taiwan lifted restrictions on filming in China in 1989, Chiung Yao led her production teams to China, making her the first Taiwanese producer to film on location there. From that point on, nearly all of her television dramas included scenes shot in China, with Chinese actors joining the casts. In the 1990s, her romance-focused dramas resonated with Taiwan's emotionally complex society, while in China, they gained popularity for their themes of freedom and liberation following years of social suppression. In Vietnam, Chiung Yao's works faced initial censorship for their depictions of extramarital affairs and love triangles but regained popularity after the government embraced reform and openness.

==== Romantic comedies ====
In 1998, My Fair Princess marked a significant departure from Chiung Yao's trademark melodramatic style, introducing a light-hearted and comedic tone. This series is "regarded as one of the most popular Chinese-language drama shows of all time". Following this success, Chiung Yao revisited and reimagined her earlier works, producing remakes of her earlier works. In 2013, she released an original drama, Flowers in Fog. The series incorporated South Korean influences and contemporary romantic elements to appeal to younger audiences. However, it received mixed reviews, with some viewers labelling it a "cringeworthy drama". Afterward, Chiung Yao gradually withdrew from the entertainment industry.

== Final years (2014–2024) ==
=== Copyright lawsuit ===
On 15 April 2014, Chiung Yao accused Chinese screenwriter and producer Yu Zheng of blatant plagiarism, seeking immediate suspension of the broadcast of his TV series Palace 3: The Lost Daughter, which she alleged to have been plagiarized from her 1992 novel Plum Blossom Scar (梅花烙). Yu denied the claim. On 28 April, Chiung Yao filed a plagiarism lawsuit against Yu. On 12 December 109 Chinese screenwriters published a joint statement supporting Chiung Yao. A day later, an additional 30 Chinese screenwriters made their support of Chiung Yao known.

On 25 December, the court ruled in Chiung Yao's favour, ordering four companies to stop distributing and broadcasting The Palace: The Lost Daughter, also demanding Yu Zheng to publicly apologize and pay Chiung Yao RMB 5 million (around $800,000) in compensation. China Radio International called it a "landmark ruling".

=== Family disputes ===
In 1959, Chiung Yao married Ma Sen-ching (馬森慶), also a writer. After she became famous and began to outshine her husband, their marriage broke down and ended in divorce in 1964. In 1979, Chiung Yao married her publisher Ping Hsin-tao, who had had three children with his first wife Lin Wan-zhen. In 2018, Lin published a memoir in which she accused Chiung Yao of breaking up her marriage.

After Ping suffered a stroke and lost nearly all ability to communicate, Chiung Yao had a falling out with her step-children over whether to continue his intubation. Thereafter, she became a supporter of voluntary euthanasia, as expressed in her open letter published in March 2017. Ping died on 23 May 2019, at the age of 92.

=== Advocacy for Han Kuo-yu ===
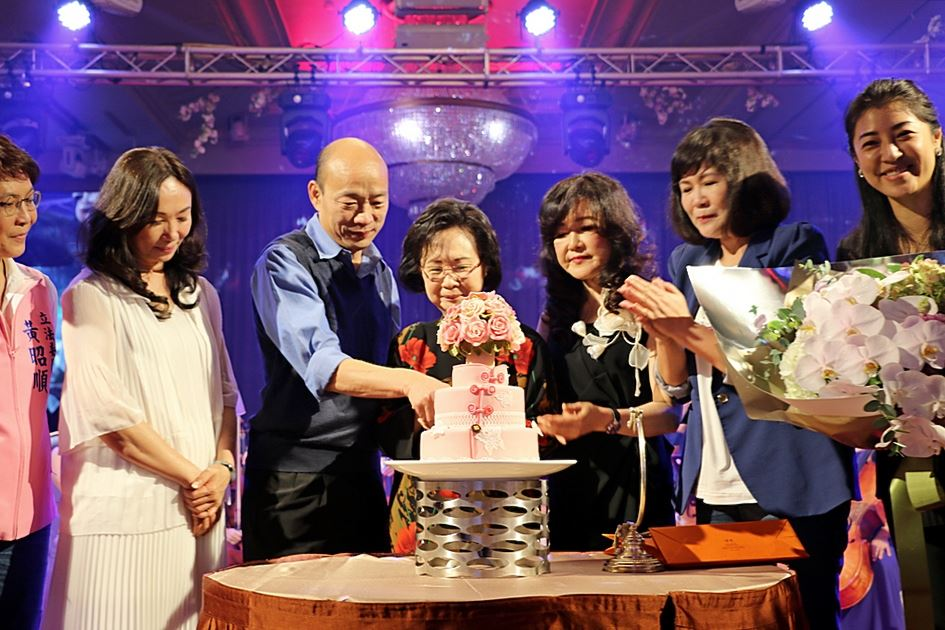
Han Kuo-yu and Chiung Yao at a banquet

She refrained from expressing political opinions until 2018 when Kuomintang candidate Han Kuo-yu won the Kaohsiung mayoral election. Following his victory, Chiung Yao published an open letter praising him and later accepted an invitation to serve as the chief consultant for Kaohsiung's Love Industry Chain project. In 2020, upon learning of Han's presidential campaign, she once again expressed strong support, referring to him as a "hero" in her writings. After Han's defeat in the election, she posted a message stating: "Though the people may shed tears, the hero remains unyielding. After the heart-wrenching pain, may the scars heal".

== Death ==
On 4 December 2024, Chiung Yao was found dead at her home in Tamsui District, New Taipei City, after an apparent charcoal-burning suicide, and left behind a note. Her son stated that he had asked her secretary to check on her around midday. Upon entering the house, the secretary discovered that Chiung Yao had no vital signs and immediately called emergency services. When paramedics arrived, they confirmed she had died and did not transport her to the hospital. Local police confirmed that there was no external intervention in her death. She died at the age of 86.

Six days before her death, Chiung Yao had posted a tribute to her late husband on social media. In her suicide note, she described her death as "flitting away", and wrote, "I have truly lived, never wasted my life". Later that afternoon, her secretary posted a pre-recorded video and her final written work, When Snowflakes Fall, on Chiung Yao's Facebook page. In her final social media message, she expressed a desire to avoid the pain of "weakness, deterioration, illness, hospital visits, treatment, and lingering suffering". However, she also urged younger generations not to give up on life easily. Many actors who had starred in her works, such as Zhao Wei, expressed their condolences online.

Her death also sparked discussions in Taiwan about euthanasia. On 5 December, Chiung Yao's family announced on Facebook that, as per her last will, no public commemorations would be held, in order to avoid using public resources.

Chinese dissident Wang Dan expressed disapproval of Chiung Yao's later political stance but urged respect for others' choices to mourn or not mourn her death. He emphasised that "not everything in this world needs to be measured by political correctness".

== Reception ==
Chiung Yao's romance novels were very well received in Taiwan, and by the 1990s, she was also one of the best-selling authors in China. She has since been enormously popular throughout the Chinese-speaking world. Chiung Yao's readership and viewership are predominantly female, owing to her emphasis on the feelings of young women. Her biggest sellers are Outside the Window and Deep Is the Courtyard (1969), which have been repeatedly reprinted. She is often regarded as among the most popular and foremost contemporary romance novelists in the Chinese-speaking world.

Her novels have been praised for the prose, the poetry that is part of her earlier works, and the literary allusions of their titles. The Columbia Companion to Modern East Asian Literature states the novels are sometimes described as "morbid", as some feature socially or ethically questionable romantic relationships (e.g. between teacher and student). Her romance novels and their film adaptions have been criticized for their melodramatic plotlines and long-winded dialogues.

== Personal life ==
=== Family ===
Chiung Yao's second husband was Ping Hsin-tao, the head of Crown Publishing, with whom she had an eight-year extramarital affair before their marriage. Her father, Chen Chih-ping, was a professor in the Department of Chinese Literature at National Taiwan Normal University. Her mother, Yuan Hsing-shu, taught Chinese at Taipei Municipal Chien Kuo High School. Her maternal grandfather, Yuan Li-chen, served as the first president of the Bank of Communications. Her maternal grandmother, Tseng Yi, was self-taught and excelled in poetry and painting. She was also a nationally renowned female physician in China. Her granduncle, Yuan Li-zhun, was a tutor to the Xuantong Emperor. Her aunt, Yuan Jing, was a writer, and another aunt, Yuan Xiaoyuan, was China's first female diplomat and tax official.

=== Religion ===
Chiung Yao was an atheist. In her later years, she expressed respect for religion on multiple occasions but consistently rejected any form of proselytisation or religious rituals. She regarded ghosts and deities as elements of literature and drama and rejected the possibility of their existence in reality. She advocated confronting life by enriching oneself rather than relying on religion or superstitions.

In her will, she explicitly requested that no religious practices be used to commemorate her - such as setting up a mourning hall, burning joss paper, or holding traditional rituals like the "seven-day rites". Instead, she expressed a preference for an eco-friendly flower burial. She emphasized that death was a deeply personal matter and should not impose a burden on others.

== Publications ==
Year	Chinese title	English title	Adaptations	Notes
1962	情人谷	Lover's Dale		Translated into English by Tommy Lee.
1963	窗外	Outside the Window	Outside the Window (1973)	
1964	煙雨濛濛	Misty Rain	Romance in the Rain (2001)	Translated into English by Mark Wilfer and released as Fire and Rain.
1964	菟絲花			
1964	幾度夕陽紅	Several Degrees of Sunset Red		
1964	潮聲			
1965	船			
1966	六個夢: 追尋; 啞妻; 三朵花; 生命的鞭; 歸人記錄; 流亡曲	Six Dreams: Seek (Released as Wan-chun's Three Loves); Mute Wife; Three Flowers; The Whip Of Life; Remembering; Exile Song		An anthology of six short stories. Wan-Chun's Three Loves was initially released in 1965 as a novelette.
1966	紫貝殼	Purple Shell		
1966	寒煙翠	Mist Over Dream Lake	Mist Over Dream Lake (1967)	
1966	月滿西樓			
1967	翦翦風	Rude Wind		
1968	彩雲飛	Flying Rosy Clouds	The Young Ones (1973)	
1969	庭院深深	The Deep Garden and Courtyard	Deep Garden (1987)	
1969	星河	Starry River		
1971	水靈			
1971	白狐	White Fox		
1972	海鷗飛處	Where Seagulls Fly		
1972	心有千千結	The Heart has a Million Knots		
1973	一簾幽夢	Dream Curtain	Fantasies Behind the Pearly Curtain (1975)	Alternatively known as Dream Link.
1973	浪花		Painted Waves of Love	
1974	碧雲天		Posterity and Perplexity	
1974	女朋友	Girlfriend		
1975	在水一方	One Side of the Water	One Side of the Water (1988)	Alternatively known as The Unforgettable Character
1975	秋歌			
1976	人在天涯			
1976	我是一片雲	I am a Cloud		
1976	月朦朧鳥朦朧			
1976	雁兒在林梢	The Wild Goose on the Wing	The Wild Goose on the Wing (1979)	
1977	一顆紅豆			
1978	彩霞滿天			
1978	金盞花			
1979	夢的衣裳	Clothing of Dreams	My Cape of Many Dreams (1981)	
1979	聚散兩依依			
1980	卻上心頭			
1980	問斜陽			
1981	燃燒吧！火鳥	Burning Firebird		
1981	昨夜之燈			
1982	匆匆，太匆匆			
1983	失火的天堂			
1985	冰兒			
1984	不曾失落的日子·童年	Escape from Heng Yang		Translated into English by Eugene Lo Wei.
1988	剪不斷的鄉愁－瓊瑤大陸行			
1990	雪珂	Xue Ke (lit. 'Snow Jade')		
1990	望夫崖	Wang Fu Cliff (lit. 'The "Awaiting Husband" Cliff')		
1992	青青河邊草	Green Green Grass by the River	Green Green Grass by the River (1992)	
1992	梅花烙	Plum Blossom Scar		
1993	水雲間	Between The Water and Cloud		
1993	鬼丈夫	Ghost Husband		
1994	新月格格	Princess Xinyue (lit. Princess New-Moon)		
1994	煙鎖重樓	Smoke Amongst The Floor		
1997	還珠格格	Princess Pearl	My Fair Princess (1998)	Princess Returning Pearl
1998	蒼天有淚	Tears In Heaven		
1999	還珠格格第二部	Princess Pearl Part 2		
2003	還珠格格第三部之天上人間	Princess Pearl Part 3: Heaven and Earth		
