= IPartment 5 =

- Season season five
- Starring: Leading starring Lou Yixiao, Sun Yizhou, Li Jinming, Li Jiahang; Starring Zhang Yiduo, Guo Guo, Wan Zilin; Specially starred in Chen He, Zhao Wenqi
- No. of episodes: 36

Release
- Original network: IQIYI
- Original release: January 12 – January 28, 2020

Season chronology
- ← Previous; Love Apartment (2014)

"IPartment 5" is the fifth and final season of the mainland Chinese urban romantic sitcom Love Apartment. The season was directed by Wei Zheng. The scriptwriters were Wei Zheng and Zou Jie. The actors are Lou Yixiao, Li Jiahang, Sun Yizhou, Li Jinming. Also featured were Zhang Yiduo, Cheng Guo, and Wan Zilin, with special appearances by Chen He and Zhao Wenqi.

"IPartment 5" started filming and production on April 11, 2019, and officially wrapped on August 24 of the same year.

== Platform ==
broadcasting platform	location	broadcast date	time
IQIYI	China	January 12, 2020	Two episodes are updated every Sunday to Tuesday at 20:00
iQIYI（Stored in page archive backup） YouTube（Stored in page archive backup）	Hong Kong; Taiwan; Malaysia;Singapore; Myanmar;Malaysia; Thailand; Indonesia; Cambodia ; Philippines	January 12, 2020	Two episodes are updated every Sunday to Tuesday at 20:00
IQIYI频道300	Malaysia	May 18, 2020	Monday to Tuesday 22:00 - 00:00 (Two episodes consecutively)

== Introduction ==
After many years in their search for love, all the old residents of iPartment have achieved their goals, some reinforcing their relationships and others getting married. Everyone's love stories continue to develop in surprising ways. Some couples have bumps in their relationships, and some are flying around, planning their weddings. The iPartment seems to be a magical place, where every couple who truly loves each other can get blessings and live happily ever after. As the romantic reputation of the apartment spreads, new residents arrive. The new residents bring along new lifestyles, which make the old residents, once the trendsetters, feel ashamed. Compared with the youthful vigor of the new residents, the old residents have a mature and stable attitude towards love and life after years of experience. New and old residents try their best to understand each other, help each other, and make up for their missteps. Flowing love stories and new romances are constantly being staged here.

== Actors ==
=== Starring ===
actor	role	role profile
Li Jiahang	Zhang Wei	A lawyer, nicknamed Zhang Yida. The kindest man in the iPartment and Zhuge Dali's boyfriend. Zhao Haitang's love rival. Born in an orphanage, he is quite frugal. His favorite cartoon character is SpongeBob SquarePants. He opened his own law firm this season.
Lou Yixiao	Hu Yi Fei	A post-doc and teacher. Wife of Zeng Xiaoxian, and teacher of Zhao Haitang and Zhuge Dali. She registered her marriage to Zeng Xiaoxian a year before the story begins. Her skill is "flicking a flash."
Sun Yizhou	Lu Ziqiao	Nicknamed Lui Siu Bou. He is the husband of Chen Meijia and the father of Lu Jiayi. He runs an online shop this season and sells "Hey Pineapple" cupcakes through a live-streaming platform.
Li Jinming	Chen Meijia	Lu Ziqiao's wife, and the mother of Lu Jiayi. She is not very good at math, but helps to run an online store this season. When she was pregnant, she suffered from prenatal depression.

=== Starring ===
actor	role	role profile
Zhang Yiduo	Zhao Haitang	His real name is Zhao Lihua. A rich heir and the president of the university flash mob club. He likes to write novels and play guitar. He likes Zhuge Dali very much, and regards Zhang Wei as a rival and often mocks him. He is friends with Curry Paste.
Cheng Guo	Zhuge Dali	A graduate student, majoring in economics. Zhang Wei's girlfriend. She studies the theories of Max Planck. The last episode revealed that she will study abroad at the University of Berlin in Germany.
Wan Zilin	Curry Paste	Her real name is Scarlett, but she rarely reveals it. A foodie with a carefree personality, she likes charismatic, handsome guys. Her parents divorced when she was young. She worked as a live-streamer before she became Zhang Wei's assistant. She also worked in the convenience store and cafe downstairs.

=== Special Appearance ===
actor	role	role profile
Chen He	Zeng Xiao Xian	The host of the radio show "Your Moon My Heart." Hu Yifei's husband. The vice-chairman of the Residential Committee of the apartment. He was dispatched to the Alxa Desert this season.
Zhao Wenqi	Qin Yumo	Hu Yifei's high school classmate and former tenant of the apartment. An intellectual, beautiful, sensitive and generous white-collar office worker in a cosmetics company. The last episode revealed that her career is improving. There is a relationship plotline with Du Jun.

=== Other Actors ===
actor	role	role profile
Liu Yijun	Xiao Hei	Formerly known as Bai Kai. Lives in apartment 3502 (that is, downstairs). He is also known as "Downstairs Xiaohei" in the first four seasons. Xiao Hei speaks with a Shandong dialect accent.
Liu Hao	Ajie	The takeaway guy from Suning's shop, and Curry Paste's former crush.
Wang Yunfan	Du Jun	She has a sheep beard and speaks very slowly. The former tenant Guan Gu's magical elder brother was also a guest actor in the previous work. Have a relationship with Qin Yumo.
Banyan	Lisa Rong	Producer of the radio program "Your Moon, My Heart." Guest starred in the previous season as Zeng Xiaoxian and Nuo Lan's boss. Appears in Episodes 1, 7, 11, 29, and 36.
Wang Ziyi	Da Huilang	Appears in Episode 3.
Kenichi Miura	Kenjiro Sekiya	Sekiya's father, who runs a soba noodle shop. Appears in Episodes 1, 18, 19, and 36.
Liu Mengmeng	Nolan	Zeng Xiaoxian's colleague and ex-girlfriend. Appears in Episodes 1, 33, and 36.
Yu Li	Jason Yu	A psychologist. He starred in the episode "Inception" in the fourth season. Appears in Episode 25.
Li Sheng	Zhuge Dasheng	Zhuge Dali's mother, one of the top ten outstanding lawyers in the city. Appears in Episode 33.
Chen Ruoxuan	Jack	An interior designer. Designed the wedding decorations for Hu Yifei. Adept at underwater hide-and-seek. Appears in Episode 21.
Cheng Guo	Rose	Zhao Haitang's blind date, a lover of Hanfu, who looks exactly like Zhuge Dali. Appears in Episode 21.
Cui Yihan	little cloth	Her real name is Lu Jiayi, the daughter of Lu Ziqiao and Chen Meijia. Episode 24 is her first appearance.

== Episode ==
On January 12, 2020, the episodes of the fifth season will be launched sequentially on iQiyi, and VIP members will be able to watch 6 episodes in advance, and will start to order in advance on January 28, 2020.

No. overall	No. in season	Title	Directed by	Written by	Original release date
89	1	"Next Level in Life"	Wei Zheng	Wei Zheng Zou Jie	January 12, 2020
90	2	"Vigorously Miracle"	Wei Zheng	Wei Zheng Zou Jie	January 12, 2020
91	3	"Most Kind Man"	Wei Zheng	Wei Zheng Zou Jie	January 12, 2020 (Note: VIP抢先播出)
92	4	"A Pear Blossom Pressed Begonia"	Wei Zheng	Wei Zheng Zou Jie	January 12, 2020
93	5	"My Treasure"	Wei Zheng	Wei Zheng Zou Jie	January 12, 2020
94	6	"Matchmaker's Curse"	Wei Zheng	Wei Zheng Zou Jie	January 12, 2020
95	7	"Where is Mika"	Wei Zheng	Wei Zheng Zou Jie	January 12, 2020
96	8	"Have Something to Say"	Wei Zheng	Wei Zheng Zou Jie	January 12, 2020
97	9	"Shopping Colors"	Wei Zheng	Wei Zheng Zou Jie	January 13, 2020
98	10	"Leave the Grass on the Table"	Wei Zheng	Wei Zheng Zou Jie	January 13, 2020
99	11	"I Cheer for You"	Wei Zheng	Wei Zheng Zou Jie	January 14, 2020
100	12	"Average Looking Glasses"	Wei Zheng	Wei Zheng Zou Jie	January 14, 2020
101	13	"Barrage Space"	Wei Zheng	Wei Zheng Zou Jie	January 19, 2020
102	14	"Awaken, Super Power!"	Wei Zheng	Wei Zheng Zou Jie	January 19, 2020
103	15	"The Ultimate Survival Test"	Wei Zheng	Wei Zheng Zou Jie	January 20, 2020
104	16	"Pig Apartment"	Wei Zheng	Wei Zheng Zou Jie	January 20, 2020
105	17	"Decoration Master"	Wei Zheng	Wei Zheng Zou Jie	January 21, 2020
106	18	"My Best Friend's Wedding (Part 1)"	Wei Zheng	Wei Zheng Zou Jie	January 21, 2020
107	19	"My Best Friend's Wedding (Part 2)"	Wei Zheng	Wei Zheng Zou Jie	January 26, 2020
108	20	"Best Gift"	Wei Zheng	Wei Zheng Zou Jie	January 26, 2020
109	21	"New Dating Era"	Wei Zheng	Wei Zheng Zou Jie	January 27, 2020
110	22	"A Good Show"	Wei Zheng	Wei Zheng Zou Jie	January 27, 2020
111	23	"Desperate to Live"	Wei Zheng	Wei Zheng Zou Jie	January 28, 2020
112	24	"Desperate Express"	Wei Zheng	Wei Zheng Zou Jie	January 28, 2020
113	25	"Your Name"	Wei Zheng	Wei Zheng Zou Jie	January 28, 2020 (Note: 超前点播)
114	26	"Legal Family"	Wei Zheng	Wei Zheng Zou Jie	January 28, 2020
115	27	"Win at the Starting Line"	Wei Zheng	Wei Zheng Zou Jie	January 28, 2020
116	28	"Plan B"	Wei Zheng	Wei Zheng Zou Jie	January 28, 2020
117	29	"League of Keepers"	Wei Zheng	Wei Zheng Zou Jie	January 28, 2020
118	30	"I Have a Date With AI"	Wei Zheng	Wei Zheng Zou Jie	January 28, 2020
119	31	"Simulated Family"	Wei Zheng	Wei Zheng Zou Jie	January 28, 2020
120	32	"True Love Travels Around"	Wei Zheng	Wei Zheng Zou Jie	January 28, 2020
121	33	"Meet My Mother-in-Law"	Wei Zheng	Wei Zheng Zou Jie	January 28, 2020
122	34	"Laughter in Heart"	Wei Zheng	Wei Zheng Zou Jie	January 28, 2020
123	35	"WeChat War"	Wei Zheng Ni Hongyi	Wei Zheng Zou Jie	January 28, 2020
124	36	"Finally Married"	Wei Zheng	Wei Zheng Zou Jie	January 28, 2020 (Note: Advance on demand)

Some title sequences in this season are different from the usual one: the openings of the 15th episode "Ultimate Survival Test" and the 31st episode "Simulated Family" are 'set' in Zhao Haitang's imagination, where the typical introductions of the main characters are all replaced by Haitang and Dali; in the 34th episode "Laughter in the Heart", after learning that the apartment is about to be demolished, the opening theme changes to a somber tone, and the title song becomes "The Lonely Corner" sung by director Wei Zheng, and Chen He (Zeng Xiaoxian) was listed as a leading role, not a special performance; and the 35th episode "WeChat War" has no regular title sequence, only the episode name and the approval number of the radio and television.

All 13 leading actors from all five seasons are listed in the credits after the finale of Episode 36, "Finally Married."

Episode 13, "Pop-Up Space", is the first interactive episode in five seasons, where viewers choose different pop-ups that will correspond to different episodes.

In Episode 20, "The Best Gift", after Zhao Haitang and Curry Paste have a drink together on Valentine's Day, there is a scene where Curry Paste falls asleep on Zhao Haitang's shoulder; and in episode 24, "The Best Gift", there is a scene where Zhao Haitang, who was stuck in a delivery port when Chen Meijia's baby was born, is released and shouts "I'm finally out! " Although the scene was not aired, the cut footage from Episode 24 appeared at the end of the set clip released by director Wei Zheng, which some netizens speculated was a teaser for a new film to follow.

== Music ==
Compared with the previous work, this season uses more music and takes on the form of musical drama.

Among them, the songs with bold text are all included in NetEase Cloud Music: Parting Moment IPartment 5 TV Series Original Soundtrack.

In addition, the piano soundtrack features selections from: Qin Sifeng's album "To Petunia", "The Sky of Dun Morogh."

== Trivia ==
- Due to his work schedule, Chen He (Zeng Xiaoxian) has a reduced role, only making a special appearance this season.
- The actor Li Sheng (Zhuge Dasheng) is actually the spouse of Li Jiahang (Zhang Wei).
- Some of the leading actors in the previous four seasons did not participate in the show, including Wang Chuanjun (Guan Guwei), Jin Shijia (Lu Zhanbo), Zhao Ji (Lin Wanyu) and Deng Jiajia (Tang Youyou).
- The actor who played the big brother in the previous four seasons was replaced by Du Jun and Wang Yunfan this season.
- The youngest protagonist in the drama is Zhuge Dali, but none of the actors were born after 2000. The youngest lead actor is Wan Seilin, who plays Curry Paste.

== Evaluation and Controversy ==
=== Douban score ===
After its launch, IPartment 5 had a rating of 4.6 out of 10 on Douban, making it the lowest rating in the history of the IPartment 5 TV series, while the previous four have all scored above a 7,0 on Douban, and even the extras have scored above 6. However, as the season progressed, the audience's praise for the episodes increased and they said they could understand the director's original intention for the musical form. The Douban rating has risen slightly over time. By mid-February 2020, the Douban rating for Season 5 had risen back to 6.7, and by early June, it had risen to 7.0 points.

=== LEGO Controversy ===
iPartment was once accused of plagiarizing the American sitcom "Friends." In 2019, "Friends" and LEGO jointly launched the 25th anniversary building block set of "Friends." iPartment 5 also launched a commemorative building block kit, which was nearly identical to 25th anniversary building block set from "Friends."

=== Prop sketches suspected of plagiarism ===
After the broadcast of iPartment 5, some netizens pointed out that the hand-painted manuscript in the 8th episode "Speak Well" (at 39:08) is very similar to an illustration in the video Becoming a Soul Painter (Part 1) by the well-known Bilibili UP creator "Old Tomato" posted in 2017. The crew of iPartment 5 apologized on Weibo, and made corrections to the relevant clips on January 15, 2020.

iPartment 5 has received mixed reviews, but the show has made attempts to improve with originality, innovating on the broadcast format by adding number of Broadway-style "songs and dances" and a lot of location filming, which was rare in previous episodes. At the same time, the series has plagiarized in a way that has not gone unnoticed.
