= Wei Zongwan =

Chinese actor (1938–2026)

- 魏宗万
- Born: 24 November 1938; Shanghai, China
- Died: 1 June 2026 (aged 87); Shanghai, China
- Education: Shanghai Theatre Academy
- Occupation: Actor
- Years active: 1982–2026
- Agent: Shanghai People's Art Theatre
- Spouse: Zhou Weiming
- Children: 2
- Awards: Golden Rooster Award for Best Supporting Actor; 1993 San Mao Joins The Army

Chinese name
- Traditional Chinese: 魏宗萬
- Simplified Chinese: 魏宗万
Transcriptions
Standard Mandarin
- Hanyu Pinyin: Wèi Zōngwàn

Wei Zongwan (Chinese: 魏宗万; 24 November 1938 – 1 June 2026) was a Chinese actor. He acted after the 1980s and appeared in over 70 films and television shows.

Wei won the Golden Rooster Award for Best Supporting Actor for his role in San Mao Joins the Army (1993), and was nominated in the Macau International Movie Festival for Best Supporting Actor for his role in A Singing Fairy (2010).

== Early life and education ==
Wei was born in Shanghai on 24 November 1938, in the Republic of China, with his ancestral home in Ningbo, Zhejiang.

After graduating from Shanghai Nanyang Model Junior High School (上海南洋模范初中) in 1955 he entered the Shanghai Turbine Plant (上海汽轮机厂) worked as a bench worker, and joined a drama team in that factory.

Wei graduated from Shanghai Theatre Academy in 1963, majoring in acting. After university, he was assigned to the Shanghai People's Art Theatre. In a very long time in the Shanghai People's Art Theatre, he acted insignificant roles vividly. When watching the sketch he acted, Hou Baolin, a xiangsheng artist, commented:"It is just perfect and leaves some leeway. Being insufficient is better than overdoing."

== Acting career ==
Wei had his first experience in front of a camera in 1982, when he was chosen to act as a supporting actor in One and Eight, the first film of the 5th generation of directors.

In 1992, he appeared in Zhang Jianya's San Mao Joins the Army, which earned him a Golden Rooster Award for Best Supporting Actor.

In 1991, he starred as Sima Yi in Zhang Shaolin's Romance of the Three Kingdoms, a historical television series where he co-starred with Tang Guoqiang, Bao Guo'an and Sun Yanjun, which was adapted from Luo Guanzhong's classical novel of the same title.

In 1997, he played a supporting role in Zhang Shaolin's television series The Water Margin, which was adapted from Shi Nai'an's classical novel of the same title.

In 2010, he participated in a romantic comedy called A Singing Fairy as "Laomo", he was nominated for "Best Supporting Actor" at the 2nd Macau International Movie Festival.

In 2014, he acted as a supporting actor in Wei Zheng's romantic comedy television series IPPrtment 4, a hot TV series starring Eric Wang, Deng Jiajia, Michael Chen, Loura Lou, Kimi Li, Jean Lee, Sean Sun and Vanessa Zhao recently in Heilongjiang, Anhui, Dragon and Hubei four major Television.

== Personal life and death ==
Wei married Zhou Weiming (Chinese: 周惟明), a retired primary school teacher. They had a stepdaughter named Yu Hong (Chinese: 于虹) and a biological daughter.

Wei died in Shanghai on 1 June 2026, at the age of 89.

== Filmography ==
=== Film ===
Year	English title	Chinese title	Role	Notes
1982	One and Eight	一个和八个	Laowantou	
1982	The Beach	海滩	Laomanli	
1985	—N/a	蜜月的阴谋	guest	
1985	—N/a	雷北利号沉默在印度洋	Zhang Shuihou	
1986	The Love Token	诱人的定情物	guest	
1987	The War of Xiangxi	湘西剿匪记	Wei Biao	
1990	—N/a	假女真情	He Rigui	
1991	Ugly As I Am, I Am Gentle	我很丑，可是我很温柔	Li Laifu	
1991	The War of Luohun Bridge	血战落魂桥	Zeng Titou	
1992	San Mao Joins the Army	三毛从军记	Laogui	
1993	—N/a	孝子贤孙伺候着	Uncle	
1994	Rescued From Desperate Situation	绝境逢生	Laowan	
1995	Wonderful Escape	巧奔妙逃	Laoyao	
1996	The Monkey King	大闹天宫	Yama	
1999	Crash Landing	紧急迫降	guest	
1999	More Naivete	多一点天真	Huang Xianren	
1999	Everyone Loves Me	人见人爱	guest	
2006	—N/a	第601个电话	guest	
2006	Yang Zhi	水浒英雄谱之青面兽杨志	guest	
2007	The Warlords	投名状	Chen Gong	
2008	Player	玩家	guest	
2009	Laowu's Oscar	老五的奥斯卡	Laozhao	
2010	A Singing Fairy	寻找刘三姐	Laomo	
2011	1911	辛亥革命	Yikuang	
2011	—N/a	女兵还乡	Chang Shou	
2011	Liu Tang	赤发鬼刘唐	Liang Zhongshu	
2011	Love Is Not Blind	失恋33天	Chen Shukun	
2012	Lu Junyi	玉麒麟卢俊义	Liang Zhongshu	
2012	I Love Wolffy	我爱灰太狼	guest	

=== Television ===
Year	English title	Chinese title	Role	Notes
1989	—N/a	桃花扇喋血记	guest	
1990	The Story of Little Cabbage and Yeung Nai-mo	杨乃武与小白菜	Yang Changjun	
1993	The Good Man: Yan Juqian	好人燕居谦	Yan Juqian	
1993	Romance of the Three Kingdoms	三国演义	Sima Yi	
1994	The War of Fengyang	血战奉阳城		
1996	—N/a	东周列国春秋篇	Tu An'gu	
1997	Tang Bohu	风流唐伯虎	Zhengde Emperor	
1997	The Water Margin	水浒传	Gao Qiu	
1998	—N/a	明镜高悬	guest	
2000	—N/a	一脚定江山	Fanlao'er	
2000	—N/a	包公生死劫	guest	
2001	Princess Is Going To Married	格格要出嫁	His Royal Highness	
2001	—N/a	江山为重	minister	
2002	Dream Is Broken in the Forbidden City	梦断紫禁城	E Gui	
2002	Public Security Bureau	公安局长	Feng Dashuan	
2002	—N/a	乐意为人	Shu De	
2002	Demi-Gods and Semi-Devils	天龙八部	Zhong Wanchou	
2003	The War of Changping	铁血长平	Wei Ran	
2003	Dead Men Do Tell Tales	大宋提刑官	an official	
2004	—N/a	江湖俏佳人	Wang Gongde	
2004	History of the Late Ming Dynasty	明末风云	Wei Zhongxian	
2004	—N/a	少年大钦差	Gao Yu	
2005	—N/a	三揭皇榜	He Zejin	
2006	—N/a	江湖往事	guest	
2006	Ming Dynasty in 1449	大明王朝1449	Wang Zhen	
2006	Arabian Jasmine Flower	茉莉花	Hu Tuanfang	
2007	Red Guards on Honghu Lake	洪湖赤卫队	Peng Batian	
2007	—N/a	生命有明天	guest	
2007	The Legend of Tieguanyin	铁观音传奇	Wei Yin	
2007	—N/a	大唐儒将开漳圣王	Yan Liben	
2007	The Sea	沧海	guest	
2008	The Curvy Moon	月儿弯弯	Laoyang	
2008	Happiness 3+2	幸福3+2	Grandfather	
2008	Warm Winter	冬暖	General Yin	
2009		满堂爹娘	Dong Qinghai	
2009	The War of Southwest China	大西南剿匪记	Xu Wangda	
2009	Unruly Bride	刁蛮新娘	Yue Jian'gong	
2010	George Wallace	风云传奇	Chen Er	
2010	The Legend of Chinese Zodiac	十二生肖传奇	a village head	
2010	Huang Tingjian	大宋才子黄庭坚	guest	
2010	The War of Qingjiangfu	狭路兄弟	guest	
2011	Heroes of Sui and Tang Dynasties 1 & 2	隋唐英雄	Yuwen Huaji	
2011	Mazu	妈祖	Azure Dragon	
2011	Always Faithful	永远忠诚	Yu Pingzhang	
2011	The Old Patient	老病号	guest	
2013	Rong Hong	容闳	guest	
2014	IPPrtment 4	爱情公寓4	Hong Qi	
2014	—N/a	飘帅	Zhang Jiusi	
2018	The Dark Lord	夜天子	Master Xia	

=== Variety show ===
Date	English title	Chinese title	Role	Notes
5 September 2016	China Showbiz: Salute to the Classics	中国文艺之向经典致敬：魏宗万	Himself	

== Awards ==
Year	Work	Award	Result	Notes
1990		1st National Drama Award for Outstanding Actor	Won	
1990		1st Shanghai Sketch Comedy Award	Won	
1993	San Mao Joins The Army	Golden Rooster Award for Best Supporting Actor	Won	
2010	A Singing Fairy	2nd Macau International Movie Festival - Best Supporting Actor	Nominated	
