= Zhao Wenqi =

Chinese actress

- 赵文琪
- Born: Zhao Wei (赵威); September 14, 1987 (age 38); Changchun, Jilin, China
- Other name: Vanessa Zhao
- Education: Beijing Film Academy
- Occupations: Actress, model, hostess
- Years active: 2004–present
- Agent: Huayi Brothers

Chinese name
- Traditional Chinese: 趙文琪
- Simplified Chinese: 赵文琪
Transcriptions
Standard Mandarin
- Hanyu Pinyin: Zhào Wénqí

Zhao Wenqi (Chinese: 赵文琪; born 14 September 1987), also known as Vanessa Zhao, is a Chinese actress and model.

Zhao is noted for playing Qin Yumo in the romantic comedy television series iPartment, which enjoyed the highest ratings in China when it was broadcast.

== Early life ==
Zhao was born in Changchun, Jilin on September 14, 1987. She graduated from Beijing Film Academy, majoring in acting.

== Acting career ==
Zhao had her first experience in front of the camera in 2004, and she was chosen to act as a support actor in The Magic Touch of Fate, a television series starring Ruby Lin and Alec Su.

After playing minor roles in various films and television series, such as Sounds of the Old City, Love in the War, Beautiful Bar, The Song of Yimeng, Happy Star, The Chinese Connection, Kou Lan Slam, Zhao received her first leading role in the second season of romantic comedy television series iPartment, alongside Eric Wang, Deng Jiajia, Michael Chen, Loura Lou, Kimi Li, Jean Lee and Sean Sun, the series was one of the most watched ones in mainland China in that year. Zhao also filmed in a number of successful sequels to iPartment.

In 2011, played the role of Scorpion Demon in Journey to the West, a myth drama starring Nie Yuan, Wu Yue, Zang Jinsheng and Elvis Tsui, which adapted from Wu Cheng'en's classical novel of the same title.

== Filmography ==
=== Film ===
| Year | English title | Chinese title | Role | Notes |
|---|---|---|---|---|
| 2004 | Sounds of the Old City | 古城琴声 | Xiao Dan | |
| 2004 | | 茶经 | Xiaoyali | |
| 2005 | Love in the War | 烽火别恋 | Lei Yurou | |
| 2005 | Beautiful Bar | 美丽酒吧 | Ya Su | |
| 2006 | The Song of Yimeng | 沂蒙调 | Qiuyun | |
| 2007 | | 为了母亲的微笑 | Bailing | |
| 2008 | The Chinese Connection | 精武门 | Sister | |
| 2008 | Kou Lan Slam | 扣篮对决 | Xiaoxiao | |
| 2009 | Tears in Heaven | 天堂有泪 | An'an | |
| 2015 | An Accidental Shot of Love | 擦枪走火 | | |

=== Television ===
| Year | English title | Chinese title | Role | Notes |
|---|---|---|---|---|
| 2004 | The Magic Touch of Fate | 魔术奇缘 | Xuan E | |
| 2007 | Happy Star | 快乐星球之逃出星球 | Teacher Murong | |
| 2008 | | 九鼎迷踪 | Yezi | |
| 2010 | iPartment 2 | 爱情公寓2 | Qin Yumo | |
| 2011 | Journey to the West | 西游记 | Scorpion Demon | |
| 2014 | iPartment 4 | 爱情公寓4 | Qin Yumo | |
| 2014 | Great Village Official | 大村官 | Xia Lan | |
