= Lou Yixiao =

Chinese actress and singer

- 娄艺潇
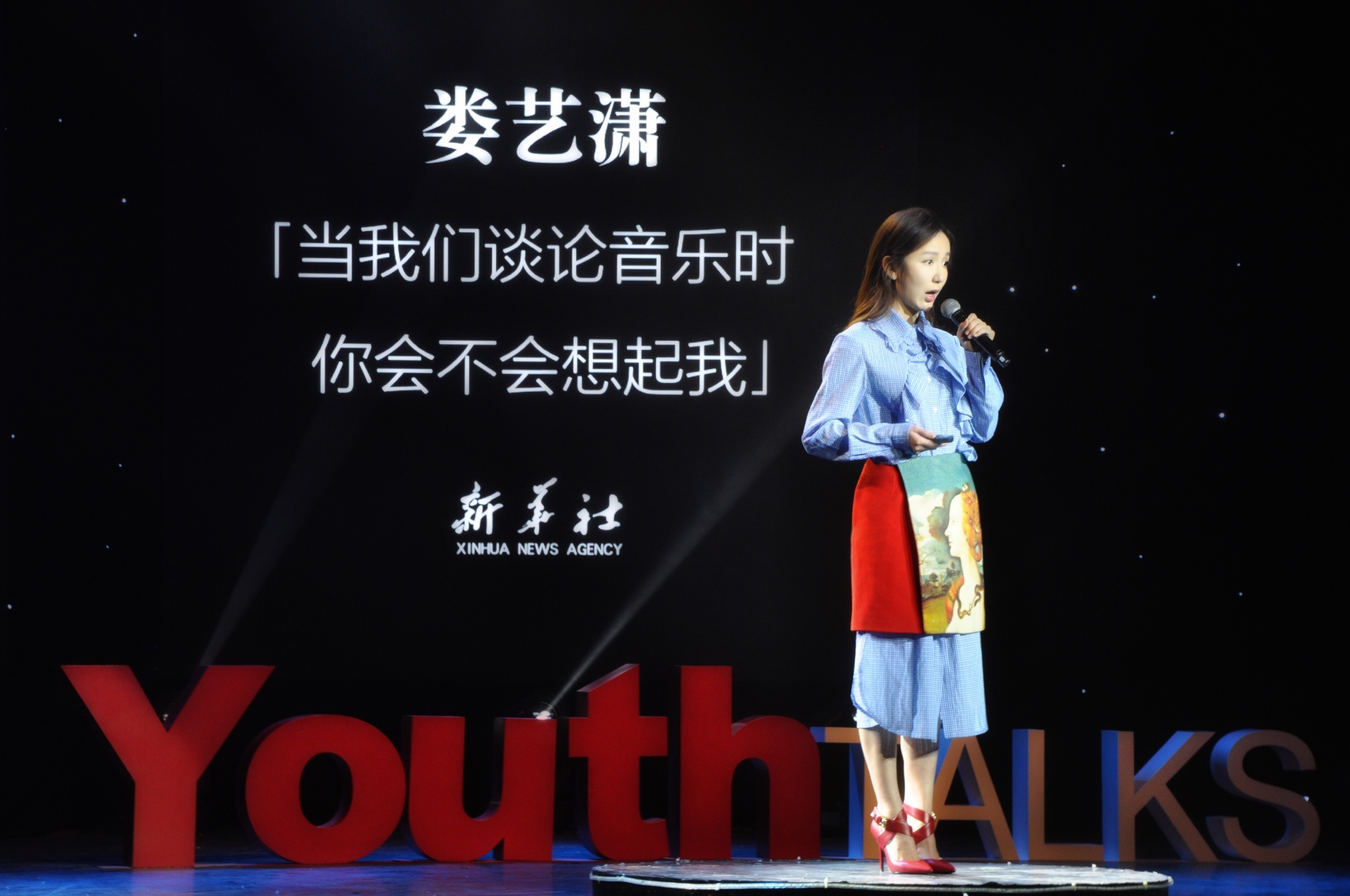
- Lou in 2017
- Born: December 27, 1988 (age 37); Ganjingzi District, Dalian, Liaoning, China
- Other name: Loura Lou
- Education: Shanghai Theatre Academy
- Occupations: Actress; singer
- Years active: 2009–present
- Musical career
- Genres: Mandopop
- Label: Warner Music Group (since 2017)

Chinese name
- Traditional Chinese: 婁藝瀟
- Simplified Chinese: 娄艺潇
Transcriptions
Standard Mandarin
- Hanyu Pinyin: Lóu Yìxiāo

Lou Yixiao (Chinese: 娄艺潇; born 27 December 1988), also known as Loura Lou, is a Chinese actress and singer.

Lou is noted for playing Hu Yifei (胡一菲) in the hit sitcom television series iPartment, which enjoyed the highest ratings in China when it was broadcast.

== Biography ==
=== Early life ===
Lou was born in Ganjingzi District of Dalian, Liaoning on December 27, 1988, the daughter of a policeman and policewoman. She graduated from Shanghai Theatre Academy, majoring in acting.

=== Acting career ===
In 2009, Lou starred in the sitcom television series iPartment, alongside Eric Wang, Deng Jiajia, Michael Chen, Sean Sun, Kimi Li, Jean Lee and Vanessa Zhao, the series was one of the most watched ones in mainland China in that year. Lou also filmed in a number of successful sequels to iPartment.

In 2014, Lou starred as Princess Jianning in the wuxia television series The Deer and the Cauldron, which adapted from Jin Yong's wuxia novel of the same title.

== Filmography ==
=== Film ===
Year	English title	Chinese title	Role	Notes/Ref.
2009	Blowing in the Wind	随风摇曳	Luo Jin	
2009	Tabarnak	滑向未来	Xiaoxiao	
2010	Beautiful Life	美丽生命	Dandan	
2012	The Secret of a Musician	独奏者的秘密	Xiaolin	Short film
2018	Monster Hunt 2	捉妖记2		Cameo
2018	Love Apartment	爱情公寓	Hu Yifei	

=== Television series ===
Year	English title	Chinese title	Role	Notes/Ref.
2009	Say Love With Music	我用音乐说爱你	Juliet	
2009	iPartment	爱情公寓	Hu Yifei	
2010	Legend of iPartment	爱情公寓外传	Hu Yifei	Cameo
2011	iPartment 2	爱情公寓2	Hu Yifei	
2011	Lady of the Law	带刀女捕快	Pang Fei	
2011	Women's Special Crime Unit	女子特案组	Zhou Feifei	
2012	iPartment 3	爱情公寓3	Hu Yifei	
2012	Modern Son-in-law	摩登女婿	Yao Bing	
2013	Love Destiny	爱情自有天意	Wan Huixiang/ Tang Tang	
2013	The War of Beauties	爱情悠悠药草香	Huang Caiwei	
2014	iPartment 4	爱情公寓4	Hu Yifei	
2014	The Deer and the Cauldron	鹿鼎记	Princess Jianning	
2015	You Are My Sisters	你是我的姐妹	An Ning	
2015	Love Jewelry	爱情珠宝	Xia Luoyi/ Fang Ziyan	
2016	Don't Lie to Love	别对爱撒谎	Hao Leyi	
2018	Love Tears Us Apart	忘情歌	Cheng Ying	
2020	iPartment 5	爱情公寓5	Hu Yifei	

== Discography ==
=== Singles ===
Date	English title	Chinese title	Label	Notes
January 23, 2012	"Little World"	小小世界		Interlude for Love Destiny
August 11, 2012	"iPartment"	爱情公寓		Interlude for iPartment 3
April 10, 2013	"Glory of the Sharpshooter"	枪神的荣耀		Theme song for Gun Slayer Legend
July 7, 2017	"Wild Lover"	野生情人	Warner Music Group	
November 22, 2017	"Step By Step"	—N/a	Warner Music Group	Interlude for The Dreaming Man
October 18, 2021	"Dreamlike World"	人间如梦		DLC theme song for The Legend of Sword and Fairy 7, duet with Audiofreak (音频怪物, real name Li Nan 李楠)

== Awards and nominations ==
Year	Award	Category	Nominated work	Result	Ref.
2020	7th The Actors of China Awards	Best Actress (Web series)	—N/a	Nominated	
