= Li Jinming =

- 李金铭
- Born: November 21, 1985 (age 40); Jinan, Shandong, China
- Other name: Kimi Li
- Education: Shanghai Theatre Academy
- Occupations: Actress, hostess, author
- Years active: 2007–present
- Agent: Shanghai Xinhai Media Corporation
- Musical career
- Genres: Mandapop

Chinese name
- Traditional Chinese: 李金銘
- Simplified Chinese: 李金铭
Transcriptions
Standard Mandarin
- Hanyu Pinyin: Lǐ Jīnmíng

Li Jinming (Chinese: 李金铭; born 21 November 1985), also known as Kimi Li, is a Chinese actress and hostess.

Li is noted for playing Chen Meijia in the romantic comedy television series iPartment, which enjoyed the highest ratings in China when it was broadcast.

== Early life and education ==
Li was born in Jinan, Shandong on November 21, 1985. She graduated from Shanghai Theatre Academy, majoring in acting.

== Acting career ==
In 2007, Li participated in Juedui Changxiang (绝对唱响) on Jiangsu Television and finished in seventh place.

Li joined Anhui Television and began hosting Sunday Best (周日我最大) in June 2009.

In 2009, Li starred in a romantic comedy television series IPartment, alongside Eric Wang, Deng Jiajia, Michael Chen, Loura Lou, Sean Sun, Jean Lee and Vanessa Zhao. The series was one of the most-watched shows in mainland China that year. Sun also appeared in a number of successful sequels to IPartment.

Li had a minor role as He Xiaoyi in the historical television series A Weaver on the Horizon (2010), which starred Liu Shishi as Princess Jiayi and Janine Chang as Huang Daopo.

Li co-starred with Janine Chang, Zhou Zihan, Mike He, Li Zhinan and Li Yifeng in the 2011 modern idol drama Sunny Happiness as Kong Xinjie.

In 2012, Li appeared in Happy Michelin Kitchen, a romantic comedy television series starring Lan Cheng Long, Cheryl Yang, Wu Jianfei and Ying'er.

In 2014, Li played Keke in the wuxia television series The Flying Daggers, which was adapted from Gu Long's wuxia novel of the same title. She also appeared in Women on the Breadfruit Tree, Loli's Beautiful Days and Strange Stories from a Chinese Studio.

== Filmography ==
=== Film ===
Year	English title	Chinese title	Role	Ref.
2016	For Love	致我们终将到来的爱情	Liang Jia	
2016	Lonely Garden	孤独花园	Luo Lan	
2018	Priestess	大傩·董春女	Dong Chunnü	
2018	iPartment	爱情公寓	Chen Meijia	

=== Television ===
Year	English title	Chinese title	Role	Ref.
2009	iPartment	爱情公寓	Chen Meijia	
2010	Happy and Love Forever	幸福一定强	Ji Shuting	
2010	A Weaver on the Horizon	天涯织女	He Xiaoyi	
2011	Sunny Happiness	幸福最晴天	Kong Xinjie	
2012	Happy Michelin Kitchen	幸福三颗星	Li Ruzhen	
2012	iPartment 3	爱情公寓3	Chen Meijia	
2013	Seven Years Itch	七年之痒	Lin Fei	
2014	iPartment 4	爱情公寓4	Chen Meijia	
2015	Women on the Breadfruit Tree	面包树上的女人	Meilun	
2015	The Flying Daggers	飞刀，又见飞刀	Keke	
2015	Loli's Beautiful Days	Loli的美好时代	Mo Chou	
2015	Strange Stories from a Chinese Studio	聊斋四	Hengniang	
2015	—N/a	医馆笑传2	Chen An'an	
2017	Super Dad & Super Kids	熊爸熊孩子	Tao Yinzi	
2018	The Flames of Kangda	烽火抗大	Liang Tingting	

== Variety show ==
Year	English title	Chinese title	Role	Ref.
2007	Absolutely Sing to Ring	绝对唱响	Competitor	
6 May 2009	Sunday Best	周日我最大	Hostess	
10 March 2017	The Negotiator (Season Two)	王牌对王牌（第二季）	Guest	
2 February 2018	24 Hours (Season Three)	二十四小时（第三季）	Guest	

== Singles ==
Year	English title	Chinese title	Ref.
2012	"iPartment"	爱情公寓	
2012	"If You Say Love Me"	如果你说爱我	
2014	"Coming to My World"	来我的世界	

== Book ==
- 最好的时光，在路上：李金铭的旅行书 [The Best Time on the Road: the Travel Book of Kimi Li] (in Chinese). Suzhou, Jiangsu: Jiangsu Literature and Art Publishing House. 2014. ISBN 9787539975757.
