= The Last Princess =

The Last Princess may refer to:

- The Last Princess (TV series), a 2008 Chinese television series
- The Last Princess (film), a 2016 South Korean film
- Kakushi Toride no San-Akunin: The Last Princess, a 2008 Japanese film
- The Last Princess, a 2012 novel by Galaxy Craze
