= Wang Fulin =

Chinese television director and producer (born 1931)

- 王扶林
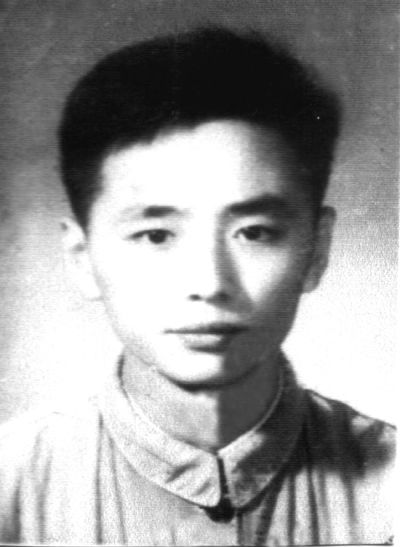
- Wang Fulin in 1952.
- Born: March 16, 1931 (age 95); Zhenjiang, Jiangsu, China
- Education: Shanghai Academy of Drama
- Occupations: Television director, producer
- Years active: 1954–present
- Agents: China National Radio; China Central Television

Wang Fulin (Chinese: 王扶林; pinyin: Wáng Fūlín; born 16 March 1931) is a Chinese television director and producer, best known for his adaptations of Dream of the Red Chamber and Romance of the Three Kingdoms, two of the Four Great Classical Novels of Chinese literature.

== Early life and education ==
Wang Fulin was born on 16 March 1931 in Zhenjiang, Jiangsu, and was raised in Shanghai. In May 1949, following the Communist victory over the Nationalists in Shanghai, he was admitted to the Shanghai Municipal Drama College, where he majored in acting. After graduating in September 1952, he was assigned to work at the Central People's Broadcasting Station (now China National Radio).

== Career ==
Wang made his directorial debut in 1954 with The Emperor's New Clothes, based on the short story by Hans Christian Andersen. His next directorial project was The New Generation, a television series created in collaboration with Da Yuanhuai. Produced by the state-owned China Central Television (CCTV), it was made to commemorate the 10th anniversary of the People's Republic of China in 1959.

In 1962, Wang was transferred to China Central Television (CCTV) as a television director, where he directed Tinder the following year. In October 1979, Wang traveled to the United Kingdom as part of a delegation from the State Administration of Press, Publication, Radio, Film and Television of China to conduct research. After watching Shakespeare's plays during his visit, he was inspired to begin writing the screenplay for Dream of the Red Chamber.

In 1980, Wang, along with Du Yu, directed Eighteen Years in the Enemy Camp, the first television series produced in mainland China. The series starred Zhang Lianwen and Wang Zhi, among others. In 1983, Wang was commissioned to direct Three-Dimensional People, based on the novel of the same name by Jiang Zilong. The series earned him the Golden Eagle Award for Best Television Series, which is considered the China Television Artists Association's equivalent to the Emmys.

Wang rose to fame after directing Dream of the Red Chamber, a television adaptation of the 18th-century Qing dynasty novel by Cao Xueqin. Filming began in 1984, and the series was released in 1987. It stars Ouyang Fenqiang as Jia Baoyu, Chen Xiaoxu as Lin Daiyu, Zhang Li as Xue Baochai, and Deng Jie as Wang Xifeng. Wang was honored with the title of "Top Ten Television Director of China" for his work on the series.

In 1988, Wang was appointed as the director of The Story of Empress Dowager Xiaozhuang. His work on the series earned him the Outstanding Director Award at the 1st National Excellent Television Awards.

In 1990, Wang was offered the role of director for Romance of the Three Kingdoms, a television adaptation of the 14th-century Ming dynasty novel by Luo Guanzhong. Production began in 1990 and concluded in 1995. The drama features Sun Yanjun as Liu Bei, Tang Guoqiang as Zhuge Liang, Bao Guo'an as Cao Cao, Wu Xiaodong as Sun Quan, alongside Lu Shuming, Li Jingfei, and Wei Zongwan in supporting roles.

Wang directed Oh, The Mountain is the Mountain in 1999 and The Legend of Goubuli in 2004.

== Filmography ==
=== Television ===
Year	English title	Chinese title	Notes
1954	The Emperor's New Clothes	皇帝的新衣	
1959	The New Generation	新的一代	
1962	Tinder	火种	
1980	Eighteen Years in the Enemy Camp	敌营十八年	
1982	Three-Dimensional People	赤橙黄绿青蓝紫	
1984	Dream of the Red Chamber	红楼梦	
1988	The Story of Empress Dowager Xiaozhuang	庄妃轶事	
1989	—N/a	人间芙蓉色	
1990	Romance of the Three Kingdoms	三国演义	
1993	—N/a	开心就好，男人没烦恼	
1999	Oh, The Mountain is the Mountain	啊，山还是山	
2004	The Legend of Goubuli	狗不理传奇	

=== Variety show ===
Date	English title	Chinese title	Role	Notes
28 May 2017	China Showbiz: Salute to the Classics: Wang Fulin	中国文艺之向经典致敬：王扶林	Himself	

== Lyrics ==
- "Which Day We Will Meet" (何日才相会)
- "The Dawn is on the Front" (曙光在前头)

== Film and TV Awards ==
Year	Nominated work	Award	Category	Result	Notes
1982	Three-Dimensional People	Golden Eagle Awards	Best Television Series	Won	
1987	Dream of the Red Chamber	—N/a	"Top Ten Television Director of China"	Won	
1989	The Story of Empress Dowager Xiaozhuang	1st National Excellent Television Awards	Outstanding Director Award	Won	
