= Zhao Ji (disambiguation) =

Zhao Ji is the personal name of Emperor Huizong of Song.

Zhao Ji may also refer to:

- Marquess Lie of Zhao, ruler of the client state Zhao of Zhou dynasty
- Lady Zhao, the mother of China's first emperor Qin Shi Huang
- Zhao Ji (athlete), Chinese paralympic athlete
- Zhao Ji (actress) (born 1987), Chinese actress
