= The Lord of Losers =

2022 Chinese web series

- Official poster
- Traditional Chinese: 破事精英
- Simplified Chinese: 破事精英
- Hanyu Pinyin: pò shì jīng yīng
- Genre: Contemporary City; workplace; Comedy
- Written by: Wei Zheng
- Directed by: Wei Zheng
- Presented by: Zou Jie
- Starring: Li Jiahang Guo Guo Zhang Yiduo Liu Zhongqiu Tu Hua Li Wenfan Sun Yiwen
- Country of origin: China
- Original language: Mandarin
- No. of episodes: 24 (45 in TVB version) = January 28, 2022

The Lord of Losers (Chinese: 破事精英) is a web drama directed by Wei Zheng and starring Li Jiahang, Zhang Yiduo, Guo Guo, Liu Zhongqiu, Tu Hua, Li Wenfan and Sun Yiwen. The play will be broadcast on iQiyi on June 18, 2022.

== Broadcasting platform ==
| Broadcast platform | location | Show Date | show time |
|---|---|---|---|
| iQiyi | Mainland China | June 18-July 4, 2022 | |

== Synopsis ==
Hu Qiang (played by Li Jiahang), an honest man who has worked at the grassroots level of the company for ten years, suddenly got a "promotion" opportunity and was transferred to a small department called "Corruption Department" as the manager. His subordinates are all wonderful, thorny programmer Ouyang Murphy (played by Cheng Guo), chicken blood salesman Tang Haixing (played by Zhang Yiduo), gossip secretary Jin Ruoyu (played by Tu Hua), mechanical designer Su Kejie (played by Liu Zhongqiu), weak copywriter Pang Xiaobai (played by Li Wenfan), and the second fool intern Sha Lele (played by Sun Yiwen), the only thing they have in common is that they are all losers. Others work 8 hours, they work ∞ hours, they have endless shit to do every day, and they can eat enough just by suffering. But even so, this group of salted fishes did not intend to lie flat. They struggled hard to save their jobs and lives and staged hilarious stories one after another.

== Cast ==
| actor | Role | Character Profile |
|---|---|---|
| Li Jiahang | Hu Qiang | John; Crack Department Manager |
| Results | Ouyang Murphy | Murphy; Programmer of the Breaking Department |
| Zhang Yiduo | Tang Haixing | Harry; Sales Representative of Breakthrough Department |
| Liu Zhongqiu | Su Kejie | Jack; Destroyer Department Designer |
| Tu Hua | Jin Ruoyu | Roy; Secretary of the Disruption Department |
| Li Wenfan | Pang Xiaobai | Blake; Copywriter of the Breaking Department |
| Sun Yiwen | Salle | Lilian; Intern of the Incident Department |
