= Wang Haojun =

Chinese actor

Wang Haojun (Chinese: 王浩钧; born 18 May 1984), also known as Laurent Wang, is a Chinese actor. He graduated from Shanghai Theatre Academy. He made his film debut in 2006 in Closet Enemy as Wu Xian.

== Filmography ==
Television series
Year	English title	Chinese title	Role	Notes
2006	Closet Enemy	最亲的敌人	Wu Xian	
2008		乱世新娘	Zhang Yushan	
2008		风月·恶之花	Ye Shao	
2008		向周星驰致敬先	Zhen Fei	
2009	The Prince of Tennis 2	网球王子2	Pu Shu	
2010	Spring Brightened Zhu Jiumei	春光灿烂猪九妹	Sudanhong	
2011	The King of Legend	传奇之王	Lei Yang	
2012	River of No Return	大江东去	Wang De	
2012		猎魔	Lao Qi	
2012	Between Zero	零度较量	Tian Feng	
2013	The Spring of Sparrow	麻雀春天	Ruan Xi	
2013	May December Love	大丈夫	Li Shuai	
2014	The Next Station is Marriage	下一站婚姻	Lu Xiucheng	
2014	Conspirators	同谋者	Jia Xiaoliu	
2015	Keep the Marriage as Jade	守婚如玉	Gao Zhipeng	
2015	My Wife is The Queen	我的媳妇是女王	Zhang Xiaoqiang	
2016	Police Beauty & K9	警花与警犬	Wen Taiyi	
2016	My Father is Wonderful	我的老爸是奇葩	Gao Shuai	
2017	Orange Street Favorite Boys	桔子街的断货男	Li Sanhuo	
2017	The EYAS	飞行少年	Liu Tianyu	
