= 1st Beijing College Student Film Festival =

Film festival edition

The 1st Beijing College Student Film Festival (simplified Chinese: 第一届北京大学生电影节; traditional Chinese: 第一屆北京大學生電影節) was held in 1993 in Beijing, China. San Mao Joins the Army was the biggest winner, receiving three awards, including Best Film Award, Best Visual Effects Award, and Artistic Exploration Award.

== Awards ==
- Best Film Award: San Mao Joins the Army, Stand Up, Don't Bend Over
- Best Actor Award: Hu Yajie for Old-Mother Soil
- Best Actress Award: Xi Meijuan for Jiang Zhuying
- Best Visual Effects Award: New Dragon Gate Inn, San Mao Joins the Army
- Artistic Exploration Award: San Mao Joins the Army
- Committee Special Award: Jiang Zhuying
- Special Jury Award: Za Zuizi
