= Chan Man-kwai =

Chinese Scammer

Chan Man Wai
- Born: April 1, 1948 (age 77); Xiamen, Republic of China
- Occupation(s): Screenwriter, occasional actor, property master
- Years active: 1983–present
- Awards: Shanghai Television Festival; Magnolia Award for Best Writing; 2014 The Orphan of Zhao

Chinese name
- Traditional Chinese: 陳文貴
- Simplified Chinese: 陈文贵
Transcriptions
Standard Mandarin
- Hanyu Pinyin: Chén Wénguì
- Musical career
- Also known as: Man Kwai (文龜), Si Ting (思婷), Bo Ren (伯仁), Agui (阿貴)
- Origin: British Hong Kong

Chan Man Wai (born April 1, 1948) is a Chinese screenwriter who began his career in Hong Kong. He has written over 40 films and TV series in Hong Kong, Taiwan and mainland China.

Chan was born and grew up in Xiamen. During the Cultural Revolution he laboured as a sent-down youth in the mountains of Yongding in southwestern Fujian. After the Cultural Revolution, he migrated to British Hong Kong in 1978, doing odd-and-end jobs for 3 years before deciding to write fiction. One of his works was published in the magazine Southern Movies (南國電影), run by the renowned Shaw Brothers Studio, which hired him as a screenwriter shortly thereafter.

== Filmography (incomplete) ==
=== Films ===
Year	English title	Chinese title	Notes
1983	Sketch	血中血	co-writer, with Wong Chi (黃志)
1983	Portrait in Crystal	水晶人	co-writer, with Wong Ying (黃鷹)
1983	Young Heroes	自古英雄出少年	writer
1983	The Home at Hong Kong	家在香港	writer
1984	Yellow Peril	黃禍	co-writer, with Lee Dang (李登)
1984	The Company	孖襟兄弟	co-writer, with Lee Dang
1984	Shaolin vs Manchu	還我少林	writer
1986	On the Red	紅外線	writer
1986	The Haunted Madam	師姐撞邪	writer
1987	Toothless Vampires	無牙殭屍	co-writer, with Cheung Kwok-yuen (張國源)
1988	Ruthless Family	法律無情	co-writer, with Bat Fung (畢鋒)
1989	Devil Hunters	獵魔群英	co-writer, with Lu Chin-ku (魯俊谷)
1990	A Woman and Seven Husbands	販母案考	co-writer, with Terry Tong (唐基明)
1992	China	燒郎紅	writer
1993	Bloody Revenge	風塵十三姨	writer
1996	The King of Masks	變臉	original story
2017	The War of Loong	龍之戰	co-wrote with Xing Yuanping

=== TV series ===
Year	English title	Chinese title	Notes
1992	The Legend of Liu Bowen	劉伯溫傳奇	
1993	Justice Pao	包青天	
1994	The Seven Heroes and Five Gallants	七俠五義	
1994	Brotherhood	兄弟有緣	
1995	Justice Pao	包青天	
1997	The Strange Cases of Lord Shi	施公奇案	
1998	Gods Are Watching from Above	舉頭三尺有神明	
1998	The Kingdom and the Beauty	江山美人	
1998	Legends of Earth God	土地公傳奇	
1998	Old House Has Joy	老房有喜	
1999	God of Fortune Arrives	財神到	
1999	Flying Dagger Li	小李飛刀	
2000	Long Rope in Hands	長纓在手	
2000	Imperial Aunt Tian Guihua	皇嫂田桂花	
2002	The Eloquent Ji Xiaolan	鐵齒銅牙紀曉嵐	
2003	The Plebeian Emperor	布衣天子	
2003	Wesley the Young Adventurer	少年王衛斯理	
2005	The Prince of Qin, Li Shimin	秦王李世民	
2006	Iron General Agui	鐵將軍阿貴	
2006	The Young Jiaqing Emperor	少年嘉慶	
2006	Liu Bowen	神機妙算劉伯溫	
2007	The Ming Dynasty: Evening Storm	大明帝國之夜來風雨	
2007	I Love Sister Furong	我愛芙蓉姐	
2008	Warriors of a New Empire	壯士出征	
2010	The Invisible General	隱形將軍	
2010	Miracle Doctor Tao	神醫大道公	
2013	The Orphan of Zhao	趙氏孤兒	Won—Magnolia Award for Best Writing, Shanghai Television Festival
2014	Native Place	原鄉	
2014	Prequel to Miracle Doctor Tao	神醫大道公前傳	
