= Qiu Xinyi =

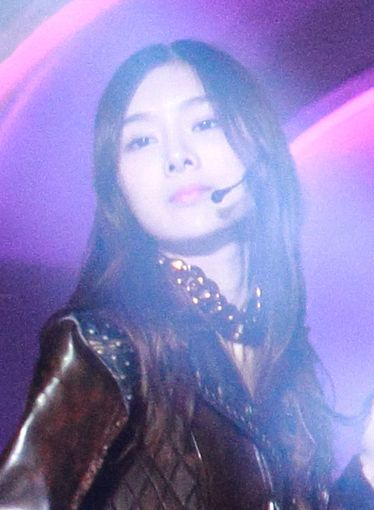
- Qiu Xinyi
- Born: 11 January 1997 (age 29); Taipei, Taiwan
- Education: Shanghai Theatre Academy
- Occupations: Singer, actress
- Years active: 2013–present

Chinese name
- Traditional Chinese: 邱欣怡
Transcriptions
Standard Mandarin
- Hanyu Pinyin: Qiū Xīnyí
- Musical career
- Origin: Hsinchu, Taiwan
- Genres: Pop, Mandopop
- Instruments: Vocals, piano
- Labels: Star48; Ninestyle Model Agency; Ninestyle Music
- Formerly of: SNH48

Qiu Xinyi (Chinese: 邱欣怡; pinyin: Qiū Xīnyí; born January 11, 1997, in Taipei) is an idol singer from Tsinchu based in Shanghai. She is a former member of Team SII of female idol group SNH48.

== Career ==
Qiu was unveiled as a first-generation member of SNH48 during an SNH48 press conference on 14 October 2012. On 25 May 2013, she made her first concert appearance during SNH48's "Blooming For You Concert". On 11 November, she became one of the members in SNH48's Team SII. On 12 December, she starred in SNH48 film Mengxiang Yubei Sheng, and on 16 December, she performed on the SNH48 Guangzhou Concert.

On 18 January 2014, Qiu performed in the SNH48 "Red & White Concert". During SNH48's first General Election, held on 26 July, Qiu came in second in place with 14802 votes, behind teammate Wu Zhehan.

On 31 January 2015, she performed during the SNH48 "Request Hour Setlist Best 30 2015". On 28 May, she starred in web drama Lonely Gourmet, based on manga series Kodoku no Gourmet. On 25 July, she took part in SNH48's second General Election, and was ranked 14th with 20078.3 votes. On 31 October, she was announced as part of sub-unit Style-7. On 26 December, she performed at SNH48 "Request Hour Setlist Best 30 2015 (2nd Edition)".

In 2016, she was admitted into Shanghai Theatre Academy.

== Discography ==
=== With SNH48 ===
==== EPs ====
Year	No.	Title	Role	Notes
2013	2	Flying Get	A-side	
2013	3	Fortune Cookie of Love	A-side	
2014	4	Heart Electric	A-side	
2014	5	UZA	A-side	
2015	6	Give Me Five!	A-side	
2015	7	After Rain	A-side	
2015	8	Manatsu no Sounds Good!	B-side	
2015	9	Halloween Night	A-side	
2015	10	New Year's Bell	A-side	
2016	11	Engine of Youth	B-side	
2016	13	Princess's Cloak	A-side	
2017	15	Each Other's Future	B-side	

==== Albums ====
- Mae Shika Mukanee (2014)

== Units ==
=== SNH48 Stage Units ===
Stage No.	Song	Notes
Team SII 1st Stage "Saishuu Bell ga Naru"	Hatsukoi Dorobou 初恋小偷	With Tang Min, Jiang Yuxi, Zhang Yuge, Xu Chenchen and Sae Miyazawa
Team SII 2nd Stage "Nagai Hikari"	Tsundere! 傲娇女孩	With Chen Si and Dai Meng
Team SII 3rd Stage "Pajama Drive"	Tenshi no Shippo 天使的尾巴	With Zhao Jiamin and Zhang Yuge
Team SII 4th Stage "RESET"	Kiseki wa ma ni Awanai 错过奇迹	With Li Yuqi and Kong Xiaoyin

=== Concert units ===
Year	Date	Name	Song	Notes
2013	25 May	Blooming For You Concert	Oshibe to Meshibe to Yoru no Chouchou 夜蝶	With Mo Han
2013	16 November	Guangzhou Concert	Hatsukoi Dorobou 初恋小盗	With Zhao Jiamin and Xu Chenchen
2014	18 January	Red and White Concert	Candy 糖	With Kong Xiaoyin and Zhang Yuge
2014	26 July	SNH48 Sousenkyo Concert in Shanghai	Kiseki wa ma ni Awanai 错过奇迹	With Li Yuqi and Kong Xiaoyin
2015	31 January	Request Hour Setlist Best 30 2015	Kinjirareta Futari 禁忌的两人	With Wu Zhehan
2015	25 July	2nd General Election Concert	Mushi no Ballad 虫之诗	With Zhao Jiamin and Ju Jingyi
2016	30 July	3rd General Election Concert	Kuchi Utsushi no Chocolate 巧克力之吻	With Zhang Yuge and Kong Xiaoyin
2017	7 January	Request Hour Setlist Best 50 (3rd Edition)	Itoshisa no defense 爱到累了	With Mo Han and Kong Xiaoyin

== Filmography ==
=== Movies ===
Year	Title	Original title	Role	Notes
2013	Mengxiang Yubei Sheng	梦想预备生之半熟少女	Herself	
2015	MoTian Jie	魔天劫	邪灵武士	
2016	Soulvenir	纪念品	Herself	
2019	Always miss you	下一任：前任	Lin (younger)	

=== Dramas ===
Year	Title	Role	Notes
2015	Lonely Gourmet 孤独的美食家		With Li Yitong

=== Variety shows ===
Year	Date	Channel	Title	Notes
2013	14 January	Star TV Chinese Channel	Gossip Queen 麻辣天后宫	
2013	16 January	Gala Television	100% Entertainment 娱乐百分百	
2013	21 July	Channel Young	The Star Live 星光现场	
2013	23 August	Beijing Television	Top Chinese Music Awards 音乐风云榜-挑战一夏	
2013	18 November	Jiangsu Television	Win in China 赢在中国蓝天碧水间	
2014	1 January	Jiangsu Television	Fei De Will Watch 非常了得	
2015	14 January	Hunan Television	I Am A Great Beauty 我是大美人	With Ju Jingyi, Li Yitong, Mo Han, Wu Zhehan and Dai Meng
2016	10 September	Hunan Television	Happy Camp 快乐大本营	With Top 16
