= The Prince of Qin, Li Shimin =

- DVD cover art
- Chinese: 秦王李世民
- Hanyu Pinyin: Qín Wáng Lǐ Shìmín
- Genre: Idol drama, historical, romance
- Written by: Chan Man-kwai
- Directed by: Lai Shuiqing
- Starring: Peter Ho; Gao Yuanyuan; Yan Kuan; Alyssa Chia; Bao Jianfeng; Florence Tan
- Opening theme: Xinhai Wuyang (心海无央) performed by Dai Yuqiang
- Ending theme: Nihao Jiuhao (你好就好) performed by Xinzi and Li Jinbo
- Country of origin: China
- Original language: Mandarin
- No. of episodes: 40

Production
- Executive producers: Han Junfeng; Xiang Hua; Situ Yuanjie; Chen Wei; Pi Jianxin; Han Guoqiang
- Producers: Li Yanju; Liu Jinan; Bian Xiaojun; Wu Dun; Zhang Zhang; Chan Man-kwai; Zhang Jinghui; Pi Jianxin
- Production location: China
- Running time: 45 minutes per episode

The Prince of Qin, Li Shimin is a 2005 Chinese television series loosely based on the early life of Li Shimin, who later became Emperor Taizong of the Tang dynasty. It focuses on Li Shimin's romance with Ruoxi, a fictitious Sui dynasty princess.

== Cast ==
- Peter Ho as Li Shimin
- Gao Yuanyuan as Yang Ruoxi
- Florence Tan as Zhangsun Long'er
- Yan Kuan as Li Jiancheng
- Bao Jianfeng as Wei Zheng
- Alyssa Chia as Yanzhi
- Lin Jiangguo as Li Yuanji
- Lü Xing as Liu Wenjing
- Yue Yueli as Li Yuan
- Gua Ah-leh as Empress Dou
- Wang Gang as Zhangsun Wuji
- Hei Zi as Yang Guang
- Xu Shouqin as Yuwen Huaji
- Wang Ning as Yuwen Chengdu
- Liu Weihua as Dou Jiande
- Li Qian as Dou Hongxian
- Chen Xianzheng as Huo Tianxing
- Fang Yuan as Haitang
- Han Zhenhua as Yuwen Kai
- Li Chongchong as Yuwen Jianling
- Jiang Hong as Lady Wu
- Chen Tao as Yuchi Gong
- Zhang Yapeng as Cheng Yaojin
- Wu Qiang as Wei Ting
- Yan Qingyu as Empress Xiao
- Gao Ziqi as Qin Shubao
