= The Home at Hong Kong =

1983 Hong Kong film by King Hoi Lam

- Film poster
- Traditional Chinese: 家在香港
- Simplified Chinese: 家在香港
- Hanyu Pinyin: Jiā Zài Xiāng Gǎng
- Jyutping: Gaa1 Zoi3 Heong1 Gong2
- Directed by: King Hoi Lam
- Screenplay by: Chan Man-kwai
- Story by: King Hoi Lam
- Produced by: Anthony Chow
- Starring: Andy Lau; Chu Hoi Ling; Ku Feng; Carroll Gordon; Isabella Kau; Newton Lai
- Cinematography: Abdul M. Rumjahn
- Edited by: Kam Ma
- Music by: Wu Da Jiang
- Production companies: Golden Harvest; Paragon Films
- Distributed by: Golden Harvest
- Release date: 19 August 1983
- Running time: 99 minutes
- Country: Hong Kong
- Language: Cantonese
- Box office: HK$4,830,255

The Home at Hong Kong is a 1983 Hong Kong drama film directed by King Hoi Lam and starring Andy Lau.

== Plot ==
Alan Wong (Andy Lau) is a Hong Kong youth who is bent to climb up the social ladder. With the help of a foreign businessman's mistress and mixed ethnicity woman Erica (Carroll Gordon), he joins a real estate company and he knows how to grasp on to opportunities and gets into high position. Later he meets Cheung Ting Ting (Chu Hoi Ling), a Mainland Chinese girl who illegally came to Hong Kong and sees her pities her and also falls in love in her. When real estate falls into low tide, many foreign businessmen leaves Hong Kong while Alan and Erica refuses to immigrate overseas. Out of jealousy, Erica informs the police that Ting is an illegally immigrant and she suicides forever. Alan and Ting disguise as Vietnamese refugees to escape however Ting refuses to do this. Uncle Fu (Ku Feng), a watchman who always wished to die in his ancestry home loses his life while helping Ting escape. Another youth, Lee Kin Fai's (Newton Lai) girlfriend, due to her family's eagerness to immigrate, was married to a cabaret manager who helps her family to Hong Kong. Fai loses his self-esteem and loses sanity after being injured in a boxing match.

== Cast ==
- Andy Lau as Alan
- Chu Hoi Ling as Cheung Ting Ting
- Ku Feng as Uncle Fu
- Carroll Gordon as Erica
- Isabella Kau as Hung
- Newton Lai as Lee Kin Fai
- Ng Wui as Ting's uncle
- Chui Yee as Ting's aunt
- Leung Hak Shun as Anderson's company director
- Wong Hung as Property Speculator
- Lee Chuen Sing as Cosmetic sales trainer
- Diego Swing as Erica's party host
- Eric Berman as Anderson
- Pak Sha Lik as Man at underground fight
- Wong Chi Wai as Underground fighter
- Chan Ling Wai as Underground fighter
- Pomson Shi as Boxing referee
- Lui Tat as Watchman
- Yat Poon Chai as Policeman
- Luk Ying Hong as Policeman

== Box office ==
The film grossed HK$4,830,255 at the Hong Kong box office during its theatrical run from 9 to 31 August 1983 in Hong Kong.

== See also ==
- Andy Lau filmography
