= Super Express (film) =

- Poster
- Chinese: 超级快递
- Directed by: Song Xiao
- Written by: Hervé Renoh; Rebecca Wang
- Produced by: Mark Gao
- Starring: Chen He; Song Ji-hyo; David Belle; Xiao Yang; Li Yuan; Mason Lee; Tai Chih-yuan; He Saifei; Kan Qingzi
- Cinematography: Alain Duplantier
- Production company: Fundamental Films
- Distributed by: Fundamental Films
- Release date: December 2, 2016 (China)
- Running time: 91 minutes
- Country: China
- Language: Mandarin
- Box office: CN¥61.6 million

Super Express is a 2016 Chinese action comedy film directed by Song Xiao and starring Chen He, Song Ji-hyo, David Belle, Xiao Yang, Li Yuan, Mason Lee, Tai Chih-yuan, He Saifei, Kan Qingzi. It was released in China by Fundamental Films on December 2, 2016.

== Plot ==
The movie begins with the robbery of a cat statue relic exhibited at a museum in Marseille, France. Maggie (Song Ji-hyo), Head of Security for the museum, gives chase after the robber, Gary (David Belle) but he manages to escape.

Next plot sees Mali (Chen He) racing down the busy city streets of Shanghai on a small motorbike to deliver a package to a client on time. He makes it as the digital clock ticks down to the very last second. Later, he goes to play mahjong with his future mother-in-law (He Saifei) and her clique of friends as Nana (Li Yuan) his girlfriend watches. His future mother-in-law does not think much of him and belittles him as they play. He wins all the games to the extremely obvious displeasure and disgruntlement of his future mother-in-law.

At the office, Mali's boss, Lao Qian (Tai Chih-yuan) entices him to make a delivery to a very important client, Wang Sangbiao (Xiao Yang) whom he disdains very much despite his initial refusal. He completes his delivery after manoeuvring his way through his usual back alleys and overcoming the obstructions put up by the residents there.

At Wang Sangbiao's residence, he is met by Maggie at the door. Here begins Mali's adventures with Maggie, being flying-kicked, punched and tied up by Maggie, being chased by Gary and his assistant, Ryan (Mason Lee), chasing Gary and Ryan, rescuing Nana from Gary and Ryan, finally fighting Gary and Ryan in a speedboat. All because of the stolen cat statue relic. The movie ends on a happy note.

== Cast ==
- Chen He as Mali
- Song Ji-hyo as Maggie / Meixi
- David Belle as Gary
- Xiao Yang as Wang Sangbiao
- Li Yuan as Nana
- Mason Lee as Ryan
- Tai Chih-yuan as Lao Qian
- He Saifei as Nana's mother
- Kan Qingzi as Dandan

== Reception ==
The film grossed CN¥61.6 million in China.
