= Love Apartment =

- Traditional Chinese: 愛情公寓
- Simplified Chinese: 爱情公寓
- Hanyu Pinyin: Àiqíng Gōngyù
- Directed by: Wei Zheng
- Written by: Wang Yuan
- Produced by: Wang Daode
- Starring: Chen He; Lou Yixiao; Deng Jiajia; Sun Yizhou; Yuan Hong; Li Jiahang
- Production company: Shanghai Film Group
- Distributed by: Shanghai Gaoge Film Production Co., Ltd.
- Release date: 10 August 2018 (China)
- Running time: 115 minutes
- Country: China
- Language: Mandarin

Love Apartment (Chinese: 爱情公寓) is a 2018 Chinese romantic comedy film directed by Wei Zheng and written by Wang Yuan. The film stars Chen He, Lou Yixiao, Deng Jiajia, Sun Yizhou, Yuan Hong, and Li Jiahang. The film premiered in China on August 10, 2018. It is based on the television series iPartment.

On May 9, 2018, the film studio announced that the film was scheduled for release on August 10, 2018, and released a poster and photos of the filming; on May 26, the film's main cast participated in the recording of the "Love Apartment" special of "Run for the Second Season" in Tianjin to promote the film; on June 6, the film studio released the film's promotional song "My Future Style" and its music video; on July 6, the film studio revealed a trailer and stills of the "Something Awesome" version; July 24, the exposure of the "adventure" version of the poster; on July 25, Lou Yixiao sang the On July 25, the music video for the theme song "Best Friends Around" was released; on July 31, the "Ten Years Together" interview featurette was released; on August 5, a ten-year birthday party was held in Shanghai, and the film's final poster was revealed.

== Plot summary ==
Your Moon My Heart radio station was temporarily changed into a Tomb Raider late night radio drama, and Zeng Xiaoxian had to read Tomb Raider. The story of Zeng Xiaoxian, Hu Yifei, Lu Ziqiao, Zhang Wei, Tang Youyou, and Chen Meijia continues to unfold, and this time, they plan to make a big deal out of it. In one of Zeng Xiaoxian's dreams, he and his Love Apartment pals mistakenly enter the world of Tomb Raider.

== Cast ==
- Chen He as Zeng Xiaoxian
- Lou Yixiao as Hu Yifei
- Deng Jiajia as Tang Youyou
- Sun Yizhou as Lü Ziqiao
- Li Jiahang as Zhang Wei
- Yuan Hong as Wu Xie
- Liu Tianzuo
- Zhao Zhi-wei as Zhang Qiling
- Zhang Shuangli as Huang Heihong
- Nanpai Sanshu as himself
- Wei Zheng as Doctor
- Yan Feng as Doctor
- Chen Xuming as Housekeeper

== Production ==
This film was shot in Shanghai.To be more precise, it is the Wenhua Jiayuan Housing ( 文化佳园） in Shanghai ‘s Yangpu District.

== Release ==
Love Apartment was released on August 10, 2018 in China.

The film received mainly negative reviews. Douban gave the drama 2.4 out of 10.

The film collected more than 290 million yuan on its opening day in China.

== Film Reviews ==
Positive Reviews

Love Apartment" still continues the light-hearted and humorous style of the drama version, bringing a lot of laughter to the audience. At the beginning of the film, when Zeng Xiaoxian's laughter and the unique background music of "Love Apartment" started, the audience was instantly brought into the rhythm of the TV version of "Love Apartment". In the film, the characters' personalities are still distinct, Hu Yifei's "pugnacity", Zeng Xiaoxian's "cheapness", Zhang Wei's "stupidity", and Mika's "meng". The characters' personalities are still distinct, Hu Yifei's "Biao", Zeng Xiaoxian's "cheap", Zhang Wei's "silly" and Meijia's "Meng". (Reviewed by China Press, Publication, Radio and Television News)

The film is more like a potpourri of "Love Apartments" + "Tomb Raider" + "100,000 Jokes", but the film is still full of laughs and jokes. As a comedy film, the overall feeling of the movie version of "Love Apartment" is similar to the drama version, with a variety of intellectual anxiety and a lot of laughs, a group of people in the movie with WeChat red packets to test the life and death of Zeng Xiaoxian bridge is very funny. (Changjiang Daily Review)

Negative Evaluation

The combination of the film and "Notes on a Tomb Raider" makes the whole film show a split and chaotic structure, with metaphysical elements, artificial intelligence messing up, and love talks while raiding tombs, making it a hybrid of tomb raiding unlike tomb raiding and love unlike love. The film is a mixture of tomb raiding and romance, with outdated Internet vocabulary such as "fuck the plane" and "666", plus the soundtrack, which is very similar to the Hollywood blockbuster Pacific Rim, and all the familiar jokes. The film is a great success. (First Financial Review)

== Film Controversy ==
On August 6, 2018, the drama side of "Love Apartments" issued a statement saying that the movie version of the same name was produced without authorization and a lawsuit had been filed. On August 7, the show's director responded that the movie version was copyrighted and had obtained prior legal authorization and permission, and on August 7, the show's director responded again that the movie version was not a hype for the movie, which heated up the "infringement" issue again.
