= Tai Chih-yuan =

Taiwanese comedian and actor (born 1965)

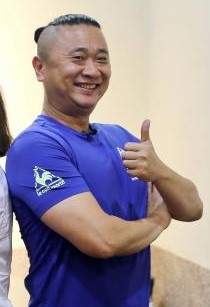
- Tai in 2019
- Born: 7 May 1965 (age 61); Beitou, Yangmingshan Administrative Bureau, Taiwan
- Education: Fu Hsing Kang College; National Taiwan University of Arts; New York Institute of Technology
- Occupations: Comedian, actor, show host
- Spouse: Hsu Ya-chi (徐雅琪) (m. 1993)
- Children: 1
- Awards: Golden Bell Awards – Best Supporting Actor; 1995 Justice Pao – Guo Huai

Chinese name
- Chinese: 邰智源
Transcriptions
Standard Mandarin
- Hanyu Pinyin: Tái Zhìyuán
Southern Min
- Hokkien POJ: Thai Tì-goân

Andy Tai Chih-yuan (Chinese: 邰智源; Pe̍h-ōe-jī: Thai Tì-goân, born 7 May 1965) is a Taiwanese comedian, actor, show host and YouTuber. He is a graduate of New York Institute of Technology.

== Filmography ==
=== Films ===
Year	English title	Chinese title	Role	Notes
2008	Mahjong King	麻將至尊王	Mahjong King	TV film
2012	Young Dudes	騷人		
2014	Lion Dancing	鐵獅玉玲瓏	chairman	
2016	Super Express	超级快递		
2017	Once Again	二次初恋		

=== TV drama ===
Year	English title	Chinese title	Role	Notes
1993	Justice Pao	包青天		unrelated characters
1994	The Seven Heroes and Five Gallants	七俠五義	Jiang Ping	
1997	The Strange Cases of Lord Shi	施公奇案	Jia Qingtian	
1998	Legends of Earth God	土地公傳奇	Han Qing	
1999	Old House Has Joy	老房有喜		
1999	The Mute and the Bride	啞巴與新娘		
2000	Lucky and Happy Every Year	吉祥如意年年來		
2002	The Sun Shines on the Back of the Mountain First	後山日先照		
2002	On Line Hero	天下無雙		
2003	Ching Lung	青龍好漢		
2004	Taiwan Tornado	台灣龍捲風	Hu Tsan-yung	
2008	Time Story	光陰的故事	Chu Tsan-fu	
2008	The Legend of Brown Sugar Chivalries	黑糖群俠傳		
2014	Once Upon a Time in Beitou	熱海戀歌	Chi Chang-hao	
2015	Lady & Liar	千金女賊	Lei Batian	
