= San Mao Joins the Army =

- Film poster
- Traditional Chinese: 三毛從軍記
- Simplified Chinese: 三毛从军记
- Hanyu Pinyin: Sān Máo Cóngjūnjì
- Directed by: Zhang Jianya
- Written by: Zhang Leping; Zhang Jianya
- Based on: San Mao Joins the Army by Zhang Leping
- Produced by: Li Dianliang
- Starring: Jia Lin; Wei Zongwan
- Cinematography: Huang Baohua
- Edited by: Sun Huimin
- Music by: Pan Guoxing
- Production company: Shanghai Film Studio
- Distributed by: Shanghai Film Studio
- Release date: 1 October 1992 (China)
- Running time: 90 minutes
- Country: China
- Language: Mandarin

San Mao Joins the Army (Chinese: 三毛从军记; pinyin: Sān Máo Cóngjūnjì) is a 1992 Chinese comedy film directed and co-written by Zhang Jianya and starring Wei Zongwan and Jia Lin. It is based on the manhua of the same name by Zhang Leping. It was produced and distributed by Shanghai Film Studio. The film premiered in China in 1992. The film follows the story of San Mao and his comrade-in-arms Laogui in the Battle of Shanghai.

== Plot ==
In 1937, after the Marco Polo Bridge Incident, the Second Sino-Japanese War breaks out. San Mao (Jia Lin), a wandering orphan, joins the army, where he meets his comrade-in-arms Laogui (Wei Zongwan), they participate in the Battle of Shanghai led by Feng Yuxiang, Chen Cheng and Zhang Zhizhong in Shanghai. One day, they are dropped into the jungle, but the plane never comes to pick them up again. They live in the jungle for a long time and become savages. One day, a plane flies over the jungle and scatters numerous leaflets. After reading the leaflet, they know that the war is over.

== Cast ==
- Jia Lin as San Mao
- Wei Zongwan as Laogui
- Sun Feihu as Chiang Kai-shek
- Zhu Yi as Division commander Niu
- Zhang Mingyu as Regimental commander
- Li Ying as Wife
- Jiang Wen as Girl
- Dong Lin as Drillmaster
- Shi Ling as General
- Zhan Che as Policeman
- Su Zhenyu as Young Master
- Xu Caigen as Japanese soldier
- Hu Ronghua as Military official

== Reception ==
Douban gave the drama 8.3 out of 10.

== Accolades ==
Date	Award	Category	Recipient(s) and nominee(s)	Result	Notes
1993	1st Beijing College Student Film Festival	Best Film	San Mao Joins the Army	Won	
1993	1st Beijing College Student Film Festival	Special Award for Artistic Innovation	San Mao Joins the Army	Won	
1993	1st Beijing College Student Film Festival	Best Visual Effects	San Mao Joins the Army	Won	
1993	5th Bingxue Film Festival	Silver Award	San Mao Joins the Army	Won	
1993	Fantasporto	Judges Award	San Mao Joins the Army	Won	
1993	50th Venice International Film Festival	Senate Special Award	San Mao Joins the Army	Won	
1993	13th Golden Rooster Awards	Best Makeup	San Mao Joins the Army	Nominated	
1993	13th Golden Rooster Awards	Best Children's film	San Mao Joins the Army	Won	
1993	13th Golden Rooster Awards	Best Director	Zhang Jianya	Nominated	
1993	13th Golden Rooster Awards	Best Supporting Actor	Wei Zongwan	Won	
1994	1st Baogang Elegant Art Award	Outstanding Film	San Mao Joins the Army	Won	
1995	6th Chinese Film Tongniu Award	Outstanding Children's Film	San Mao Joins the Army	Won	
1995	6th Chinese Film Tongniu Award	Outstanding Director	Zhang Jianya	Won	
2005	One of the Most Memorable 100 Chinese Films	—N/a	San Mao Joins the Army	Won	
