= Yan Kuan =

Chinese actor and singer (born 1979)

- Born: 24 January 1979 (age 47); Shanghai, China
- Other name: Yan Yikuan
- Education: Shanghai Theatre Academy
- Occupations: Actor; Singer
- Years active: 1999–present
- Agent: Yan Kuan Studio
- Spouse: Sunny Du (m. 2014)

Chinese name
- Traditional Chinese: 嚴寬
- Simplified Chinese: 严宽
Transcriptions
Standard Mandarin
- Hanyu Pinyin: Yán Kuān
- Website: www.weibo.com/yankuan

Yan Kuan (Chinese: 严宽; born 24 January 1979), stage name Yan YiKuan (Chinese: 严屹宽), is a Chinese actor and singer. He is best known for his roles in the television series Taiji Prodigy (2002), The Prince of Qin, Li Shimin (2005), The Last Princess (2008), All Men Are Brothers and The Glamorous Imperial Concubine (2011), Mazu (2012), Heroes in Sui and Tang Dynasties (2013), The Three Heroes and Five Gallants (2016) and Treasure Raiders (2016).

== Career ==
Yan graduated from the acting department of Shanghai Theatre Academy in 2001 and joined National Theatre Company of China. He made his debut in the film First Opium War (1997), where he had a minor role. However due to his appearance not fitting the role, his scenes were later cut.

Yan first gained attention with his appearance in wuxia drama Taiji Prodigy and later historical drama The Prince of Qin, Li Shimin. Thereafter, he starred in a series of well-received period dramas, such as Big Shot and Golden Years, which gained him considerable recognition and earned him the title of "Most Handsome Ancient Man" in China. He also starred in The Last Princess which yield high audience following during its run and led to a surge in popularity for Yan.

Yan achieved breakthrough in 2011; his performance in the television adaptation of Water Margin, All Men Are Brothers and historical palace drama The Glamorous Imperial Concubine garnered much attention for Yan, who later won the Acting Idol award at the China TV Drama Awards. Yan also starred alongside Liu Tao in mythology drama Mazu, which was a hit in China.

Yan then headlined historical drama Heroes in Sui and Tang Dynasties (2013), which marked the turning point of his career. The series earned both positive reviews and high ratings. After the series was broadcast in Taiwan, Yan experienced a surge in popularity in the region. His other notable appearances were in The Three Heroes and Five Gallants (based on The Seven Heroes and Five Gallants) and Treasure Raiders (based on Gu Long's novel of the same name). In 2016, Yan starred alongside an ensemble cast in Guo Jingming's epic fantasy film L.O.R.D: Legend of Ravaging Dynasties. In 2017, Yan co-starred in the fantasy romance film Once Upon a Time, portraying Demon Lord Qing Cang. He has also been cast in the historical drama The Legend of Ba Qing co-starring Fan Bingbing.

== Personal life ==
Yan and his girlfriend of five years, actress Sunny Du held their long-awaited wedding in Bali, Indonesia on the evening of 22 March 2014. The couple were engaged for four months before registering for marriage.

== Filmography ==
=== Film ===
Year	English title	Chinese title	Role	Notes
2004	Fairy Tale in Beijing	北京童话	Liu Xiaofeng	
2005	One Stone Two Birds 2	一石二鸟II		
2007	Momentary Beauty	瞬间的美丽	Du Peng	
2010	The Love of Three Smile Scholar and the Beauty	三笑之才子佳人	Scholar	Cameo
2014	Forever Young	怒放之青春再见	Zhang Wu	Cameo
2014	The White Haired Witch of Lunar Kingdom	白发魔女传之明月天国	Hong Taiji	
2016	L.O.R.D: Legend of Ravaging Dynasties	爵迹	Guishan Fenghun	
2017	The Chinese Widow	营救飞虎队	Village head	
2017	Once Upon a Time	三生三世十里桃花	Qing Cang	
2019	Whisper of Silent Body	秦明·生死语者	Qin Ming	
2019	Ocean Rescue	深海危机		

=== Television series ===
Year	English title	Chinese title	Role	Notes	Ref
1999	Love Letter	情书	Jin Pengcheng		
1999	The Blessed Family and The Sun, Moon and star	情牵日月星	Liu Dehua	Cameo	
2000	Love Web	心网	Bi Chenggong		
2000		碧血情仇	Kuang Xianneng		
2000		奇人奇案	Ye Yushu		
2001	Two People Is Better Than Being Alone	一个人不如两个人	Wang Dong		
2002	Chasing Dream	追梦	Sun Benli		
2002	Taiji Prodigy	少年张三丰	Yi Jifeng		
2002		秋潮向晚天	Zhuang Zili		
2003		梦里花开	Lin Hui		
2003	The Ming Dynasty	大明王朝惊变录	Zhengtong Emperor		
2005		起跑天堂	Wen Cheng		
2005	The Prince of Qin, Li Shimin	秦王李世民	Li Jiancheng		
2005	Wu Dang	武当	Zhu Yuanzhang		
2005	Young People of Border Town	飞天潜龙	Liu Yushu		
2005	Wind Warrior	风中战士	Yan Kuan		
2005		六女当铺	Qin Chi		
2006	Golden Years	金色年华	Fang Guowei		
2006	The Life and Death Love	生死绝恋	Tao Jin		
2006		春天后母心	Huzi	Cameo	
2007	The Legend of Lu Xiaofeng	陆小凤传奇之决战前后	Ye Gucheng		
2007	Justice Department	青天衙门	Yu Huanchun		
2007	Loving Insurance	情爱保险	Huang Jianyuan		
2007	Liaozhai 2	聊斋志异2	E Zichuan		
2007	Good Morning Shanghai	纯白之恋	Wang Mingwei		
2007	Big Shot	大人物	Qin Ge		
2008	Bicheonmu	飞天舞	Liu Zhangyu	Special appearance	
2008	The Last Princess	最后的格格	Fang Tianyu		
2009		犯罪启示录	Lee Dalin		
2009		大案组	Sha Cheng		
2009		冷枪	Xiang Jianfeng		
2009	Love in Trouble Time	乱世艳阳天	Qiu Zheng		
2010		烽火长城	Xiao Yunfei	broadcast 2020	
2010	Indanthrene	阴丹士林	Li Zhaocun		
2010	Ghost Catcher – Legend of Beauty Zhongkui	天师钟馗之钟馗嫁妹	Du Ping		
2010	Beauty's Rival in Palace	美人心计	Liu Shaokang	Special appearance	
2010	The Legend of Crazy Monk	活佛济公	Sheng De		
2010		生死迷局	Wu Fei		
2011	All Men Are Brothers	水浒传	Yan Qing		
2011	Palace	宫	Lin Feifan	Cameo	
2011		大唐儒将开漳圣王	Chen Yuanguang		
2011	The Glamorous Imperial Concubine	倾世皇妃	Meng Qiyou		
2012		媳妇是怎样炼成的	Tang Lei	Cameo	
2012	Happiness By Your Side	身边的幸福	Yang Qing		
2012		铁血男儿夏明翰	Xia Minghan		
2012	Lord of Legal Advisors	刑名师爷	Emperor	Cameo	
2012	Mystery of the Blue Butterfly	蓝蝶之谜	Zhuo Lixuan	Cameo	
2012	Mazu	妈祖	Wu Zonglun		
2013	Heroes in Sui and Tang Dynasties	隋唐演义	Qin Shubao		
2013	Love Love	恋了爱了	Jiang Haotian		
2013	Girlfriend's Lover	闺中密友	Li Qiuyang		
2013	Blood Oath	血誓	Ao Zi	Cameo	
2013	Longmen Express	龙门镖局	Shangguan Jingyu	Cameo	
2013		春天的绞刑架	Du Kurong		
2014	Modern Father	岳父太囧	Yuan Dong		
2014	Dating Hunter	约会专家	Gu Yi	Cameo	
2014	God of War	战神	Qin Jinwen		
2014	The Romance of the Condor Heroes	神雕侠侣	Wang Chongyang	Special appearance	
2015	Legend of the Seaways	海上絲路	Emperor Xuanzong	not broadcast	
2016	Sisters	姐妹姐妹	Cha Zhachai		
2016	Treasure Raider	新萧十一郎	Xiao Shi Yi Lang		
2016	The Three Heroes and Five Gallants	五鼠闹东京	Zhan Zhao		
2016	God of War, Zhao Yun	武神赵子龙	Liu Bei	Special appearance	
2016	Ice Fantasy	幻城	Yuan Ji	Special appearance	
2016	Ares Ensanguined Youth	战神之血染的青春	Zhuang Zian		
2016	The Legend of Flying Daggers	飞刀又见飞刀	Li Xunhuan	Special appearance	
2016	Maritime Silk Road	海上丝路	A Man / Li Long Ji	not broadcast	
2018	Love in Hanyuan	小楼又东风	Gao Chen		
2018	The Legend of Jasmine	苏茉儿传奇	Duo Ergun		
2019	The Eyas	飞行少年	Kong Xin		
2021	Silk Road Treasure	昆仑·丝路宝藏	Mu Wenshan		
TBA	Blood River	暗河传			
TBA	The Legend of Ba Qing	巴清传	Crown Prince Dan		
TBA	Love and Passion	万水千山总是情	Yuan Tingshen		
TBA	The Justice	宣判			
2026	Pursuit of Jade	逐玉	Wei Yan	Main Role	

== Discography ==
=== Albums ===
Year	English title	Chinese title	Notes
2008	The Next Heavenly King	下一站天王	

=== Singles ===
Year	English title	Chinese title	Album	Notes
2000	"Waiting for Love"	等爱	Qiren Qi'an OST	
2001	"Don't Be Afraid, There's Me"	别怕有我	Two People Is Better Than Being Alone OST	
2006	"Only Have Love"	只有爱	Golden Years OST	
2007	"Rely"	依赖	The Last Princess OST	
2007	"Breaking Fragments"	断章	The Last Princess OST	
2009	"Falling Leaves"	落叶	Qiuchao Xiang Wantian OST	
2013	"The You I Love"	我爱的你	Love Love OST	
2013	"Love Love	恋了爱了	Love Love OST	
2013	"Say I Love You Again"	再一次说爱你	Love Love OST	

== Awards and nominations ==
Year	Award	Category	Nominated work	Result	Ref.
2011	China TV Drama Awards	Acting Idol Award	—N/a	Won	
2011	China TV Drama Awards	Best Supporting Actor	All Men Are Brothers	Nominated	
2013	China TV Drama Awards	Most Popular Couple (with Sunny Du)	Girlfriend's Lover	Won	
2016	New Zealand Asia Pacific Film Festival	Most Popular Actor	—N/a	Won	
2016	China TV Drama Awards	Most Popular Couple (with Sunny Du)	Sisters	Won	
2017	Huading Awards	Best Actor (Ancient Drama)	Treasure Raiders	Nominated	
