= Mazu (TV series) =

- Traditional Chinese: 媽祖
- Simplified Chinese: 妈祖
- Hanyu Pinyin: Māzǔ
- Genre: Chinese mythology, fantasy, historical
- Based on: Mazu
- Written by: Zeng Youqing
- Directed by: Lu Qi
- Starring: Liu Tao; Stephen Wong Ka-lok; Yan Kuan
- Opening theme: Tan Jing Mazu
- Country of origin: China
- Original language: Mandarin
- No. of episodes: 38

Production
- Executive producers: Meng Fanyao, Yang Ping
- Production companies: People's Government of Putian; Binhai District Bureau of Culture; Beijing Wanglian Bafang Culture Media Co., LTD

Original release
- Network: CCTV-8
- Release: December 31, 2012 – January 8, 2013

Mazu (Chinese: 妈祖) is a 2012 mythology fantasy television series directed by Lu Qi and starring Liu Tao, Stephen Wong Ka-lok, and Yan Kuan. The television series also stars Roy Liu, Wei Zongwan, Zhao Hongfei, Coffee Lü, and Ruby Lin. It is based on the Chinese myths of Mazu.

== Plot ==
In the heavenly realm, the Jade Emperor and Guanyin (Ruby Lin) observe that the coastal population of Fujian is frequently affected by maritime disasters. To address this, a celestial spirit is sent to the mortal world.

The spirit is born as Lin Moniang (Liu Tao) into a family on Meizhou Island. Because she does not cry for the first month after birth, she is given the name "Moniang" (meaning "Silent Girl").

As she grows up, Moniang is portrayed as intelligent and compassionate, with an ability to anticipate weather and ocean conditions. She is later mentored by the Barefoot Immortal and learns various healing and protective techniques. Using these abilities, she helps fishermen avoid storms and provides medical aid during regional crises, gradually earning the respect of local communities.

Her actions bring her into conflict with Ya Zi (Zhao Hongfei), the second son of the Dragon King of the Eastern Sea, who is depicted as antagonistic toward humanity. Ya Zi and his followers are shown causing storms and maritime disasters affecting coastal regions.

With assistance from mortal allies such as official Wu Zonglun (Yan Kuan), Moniang confronts these forces. In the final episodes, she sacrifices her mortal life to protect the people, after which she is deified by the heavenly court as Mazu, the protector of seafarers.

== Cast ==
- Liu Tao as Mazu
  - Guan Xiaotong as young Mazu (Lin Moniang)
  - Davy Williams as Morris
- Stephen Wong Ka-lok as Yang Shengquan
  - Wan Changhao as Yang Shengquan
- Yan Kuan as Wu Zonglun
- Wei Zongwan as Dragon King
- Liu Jia as Mother Wang, Mazu's mother.
- Roy Liu as Lin Yuan, Mazu's father.
- Zhao Hongfei as Ya Zi, Dragon King's son.
- Coffee Lü as Guihua, Lin Yuan's adopted daughter.
- Ruby Lin as Guanyin.
- Hu Biao as Lin Hongyi, Mazu's elder brother.
- Wang Yamei as Li Haiyan, Lin Hongyi's wife.
- Zhuang Qingning as Lin Miaozhu, Mazu's elder sister.

== Reception and cultural impact ==
The television series received positive reviews.

Upon its broadcast on CCTV-8 in 2012, Mazu repeatedly topped national viewership ratings and received generally positive reviews. The production's success was officially recognized when it earned the Full-length Television Series Second Prize at the 29th Flying Apsaras Awards.

Beyond its initial broadcast, the series had a profound and unprecedented impact on modern Chinese folk religion. Lead actress Liu Tao's portrayal of the sea goddess became so deeply ingrained in coastal communities that her face became the modern visual standard for the deity. During the show's pre-production, Liu participated in a traditional zhijiao (divination blocks) ritual at the Mazu Ancestral Temple in Fujian. She threw three consecutive "Holy Blocks," which locals interpreted as Mazu's direct divine approval of her casting. The show's director, Lu Qi, further bolstered this mythology by claiming the production experienced "miraculous" weather, noting that the sky always remained clear during their ocean shoots despite forecasts of heavy rain.

As a result of the series, it became a widespread custom in Fujian for fishermen to frame photographs of Liu Tao in her Mazu costume and mount them inside their boats to pray for safe voyages, with many families placing her TV stills directly on their home altars alongside traditional wooden deity statues. The local reverence for her performance was so intense that Fujian residents reportedly considered it taboo to speak ill of the actress, equating it with disrespecting the goddess herself. The local government formally recognized her cultural contribution by granting her the title of "Global Ambassador for Mazu Culture Promotion."

Between 2024 and 2026, the series' imagery experienced a massive resurgence among young Chinese netizens, evolving into a "cyber-religion" phenomenon. Millions of young people began using high-definition stills of Liu Tao from the show as their smartphone lock screens to pray for good luck, safety, and academic success. Her social media comment sections are frequently treated by Generation Z fans as "electronic wishing wells."
