= The Last Princess (TV series) =

2008 Chinese television series

- Genre: Historical drama, romance
- Starring: Huo Siyan; Sammul Chan; Yan Yikuan; Sun Xing; Leila Tong
- Opening theme: Duanzhang (断章) performed by Yan Kuan
- Ending theme: Yilai (依赖) performed by Yan Kuan
- Country of origin: China
- Original language: Mandarin
- No. of episodes: 40

Production
- Running time: 45 minutes per episode

Original release
- Release: February 22, 2008 – March 2008

The Last Princess
- Traditional Chinese: 最後的格格
- Simplified Chinese: 最后的格格
Transcriptions
Standard Mandarin
- Hanyu Pinyin: Zuìhòu Dè Gégě

The Last Princess is a 2008 Chinese television series.

== Plot ==
This story takes place during the end of the Qing Dynasty and centers on the love story between princess Yunxiang and Wen Liangyu. Separated the night they'd planned to elope, Yunxiang was rescued by an enemy of the imperial family, Fang Tianyu. Tianyu falls for Yunxiang and frequently comes between Yunxiang and Liangyu, going as far as plotting to kill Liangyu. Yunxiang thinks Liangyu has perished and tries to kill Tianyu for revenge, but ends up on death row. Wealthy official Shen Shihao also loves Yunxiang and saves her, at which time Yunxiang discovers she's pregnant with Liangyu's child. She marries Shihao in gratitude. Eighteen years later, Liangyu returns as Beijing's most prominent mob ringleader. Unbeknownst to him, his son with Yunxiang, Shen Zikang, has grown up and become a police captain dead set on capturing Liangyu. Further complicating things, Zikang falls in love with Tianyu's daughter Yuyan, but she loves Liangyu.

== Alternate plot synopsis ==
During the Qing Dynasty, a prostitute decides to dress up her daughter, Li Kaixin, as a boy in attempt to prevent her from following the same path as she did, and become a prostitute like her. The attempt is unsuccessful. Years later, Kaixin is well known throughout the capital as the most popular courtesan.

Grown up, Kaixin makes a sudden decision in order to help her mother repay her gambling debts, which is to marry a rich eunuch. To her horror, he tries to violate her on their wedding night. To protect herself, Kaixin murders her new husband. At the same time, Kaixin's mother reunites with her husband, who happens to be a wealthy government official. Not long, Kaixin is married again. This time, it is due to her wealthy father, who marries her off to Fang Tianyu. However, with Kaixin's first love, Wen Liangyu returning home, drama ensues.

== Cast ==
- Huo Siyan as Yunxiang
- Sammul Chan as Wen Liangyu
- Yan Yikuan as Fang Tianyu
- Sun Xing as Shen Shihao
- Leila Tong as Li Kaixin
- Cheng Lisha as Pan Nianru
- Florence Tan as Hua Yuerong
- Xu Guiying as Yu Qin
- Tian Zhenwei as Shen Zikang
- Liu Jia as Fang Yuyan / Bai Rihong
- Cheng Sihan as Commander Pang
- Gao Lei as Ming Jiu
- Zhong Liang as Zhou Dabao
- Hei Jinghuan as Chun Hong
- Chen Jiaxin as child Fang Yuyan
- Shen Baoping as Fu Lun
- Zhu Zhonghe as Fang Qing Hai
- Zhao Qiang as Liu Gongzi
- Xu Min as Hua Mama
- Lu Enhua as Wan'er
