= Jin Shijia =

Chinese actor and swimmer (born 1986)

- 金世佳
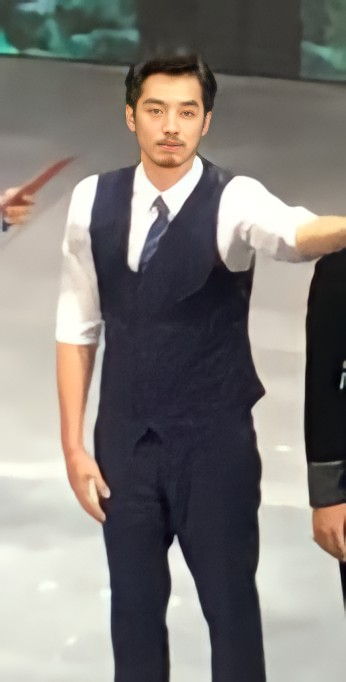
- Jin Shijia in the play "The Merchant of Venice" on 5 October 2019
- Born: November 10, 1986 (age 39); Shanghai, China
- Other name: Kingscar Jin
- Education: Yong'an School; Shanghai No.62 Meddle School; Shanghai No.62 High School; Shanghai Theatre Academy
- Occupations: Actor, swimmer
- Years active: 2009-present
- Spouse: Unknown
- Children: 1
- Sports career
- Height: 189-cm (74 in)
- Weight: 77-kg (170 lb)
- Sport: Swimming
Medal record
Men's 100m Freestyle
Representing China
National Youth Championships
Silver medal – second place	2003	National Youth Championships – Men's 100m Freestyle

Jin Shijia (Chinese: 金世佳; pinyin: Jīn Shìjiā; born 10 November 1986), also known as Kingscar Jin, is a Chinese actor and swimmer.

Jin is noted for playing Lu Zhanbo in the romantic comedy television series iPartment, which was ranked one of the highest ratings in China when it was broadcast.

== Early life and education ==
Jin was born in Shanghai on November 10, 1986, in his ancestral home in Xiangshan County, Ningbo, Zhejiang. During his early years, Jin attended Yong'an School, Shanghai No.62 Meddle School and Shanghai No.62 High School. Jin graduated from Shanghai Theatre Academy, majoring in acting.

In 2003, Jin won the silver medal in Men's 100m Freestyle of the National Youth Championships.

== Acting career ==
Jin starred in a number of successful sequels beginning with iPartment, which gained great popularity among Chinese young generation and Jin quickly rose to prominence. In the comedy television series iPartment, Jin played the role of Lu Zhanbo, a top student who falls in love with the daughter of a billionaire banker.

In 2014, Jin participated in the romantic comedy television series Tiny Times, which adapted from the Chinese novelist Guo Jingming's novel of the same title.

== Filmography ==
=== Film ===
Year	English title	Chinese title	Role	Notes
2015	A Fool	一个勺子	Diaozi	
2015	Les Aventures d'Anthony	陪安东尼度过漫长岁月	Fang Jie	
2015	Fall in Love Like a Star	怦然星动	Bing	Cameo
2016	Captain America: Civil War	美国队长3	Chinese News Reporter	Cameo
2016	The Precipice Game	魔轮	Yu Bingchuan	
2016	Never Gone	致青春：原来你还在这里	Zhou Ziyi	
2017	Didi's Dream	吃吃的愛	Kouzi	
2018	Dream Breaker	破梦游戏		
2019	Midnight Diner	深夜食堂		
2019	Yesterday Once More	昨日重现		
2022	Someday or One Day	想見你	Yang Hao	

=== Television series ===
Year	English title	Chinese title	Role	Notes
2009	iPartment	爱情公寓	Lu Zhanbo	
2011	The Prince of Tennis	加油！网球王子	Hei Yu	Cameo
2011	iPartment 2	爱情公寓2	Lu Zhanbo	
2012	iPartment 3	爱情公寓3	Lu Zhanbo	
2014	iPartment 4	爱情公寓4	Lu Zhanbo	
2014	Tiny Times	小时代之折纸时代	Wei Hai	
2014	Heroes of the War	火线英雄	Zhang Zhigang	
2014	Cosmetology High	美人制造	Helan Jun	
2015	My Amazing Bride	极品新娘	Shen Bonan	
2015	Hero Dog	神犬小七	Ai Liang	
2017	Above the Clouds	云巅之上	Mi Di	Cameo
2018	Forty Years We Walked	我们的四十年	Feng Du	
2020	Tientsin Mystic 2	河神2	Guo Deyou	
2020	Twenty Your Life On	二十不惑	Zhou Xun	
2022	Under the Skin	猎罪图鉴	Du Cheng	
2025	Sword Rose	利剑玫瑰	Chang Rui	

== Awards and nominations ==
Year	Award	Category	Nominated work	Result	Ref.
2020	7th The Actors of China Award Ceremony	Best Actor (Emerald)	—N/a	Pending	
