= Zhao Ji (actress) =

Chinese actress (born 1987)

- 赵霁
- Born: October 28, 1987 (age 38); Zibo, Shandong, China
- Other name: Evonne Zhao
- Education: Shanghai Theatre Academy
- Occupations: Actress, model
- Years active: 2007–present

Chinese name
- Traditional Chinese: 趙霽
- Simplified Chinese: 赵霁
Transcriptions
Standard Mandarin
- Hanyu Pinyin: Zhào Jì

Zhao Ji (Chinese: 赵霁; born 28 October 1987), also known as Evonne Zhao, is a Chinese actress and model.

Jin is noted for playing Lin Wanyu in the romantic comedy television series iPartment, which was one of the highest ratings in China when it was broadcast.

== Early life ==
Zhao was born in Zichuan District of Zibo city, Shandong province on October 28, 1987. During her early years, she attended Shandong Art Academy and Zibo No.4 High School. She graduated from Shanghai Theatre Academy, majoring in acting.

== Acting career ==
Zhao starred in a number of successful sequels beginning with iPartment, which enjoyed the highest ratings in China and Wang quickly rose to prominence. In the romantic comedy television series iPartment, Zhao played the role of Lin Wanyu, the daughter of a billionaire banker, who falls in love with Lu Zhanbo, This was followed by iPartment 3 and iPartment 4.

== Filmography ==
=== Film ===
Year	English title	Chinese title	Role	Notes
2007	Hard to Find True Love	难得有情人	Lu Lu	
2007	In The Name of Shootingstar	逆转流星	Ning Xin'er	

=== Television ===
Year	English title	Chinese title	Role	Notes
2009	iPartment	爱情公寓	Lin Wanyu	
2012	iPartment 3	爱情公寓3	Lin Wanyu	
2012	Say that You Love Me	爱是从告白开始的	Shangguan Yi	
2014	iPartment 4	爱情公寓4	Lin Wanyu	
