= Shanghai Theatre Academy =

Dramatic arts school in Shanghai, China

- 上海戏剧学院
- Logo for academy
- Type: Public
- Established: December 1, 1945; 81 years ago
- Officer in charge: Party Secretary
- President: Sheng Han
- Location: Shanghai, China
- Website: sta.edu.cn

Shanghai Theatre Academy
- Simplified Chinese: 上海戏剧学院
- Traditional Chinese: 上海戲劇學院
Transcriptions
Standard Mandarin
- Hanyu Pinyin: Shànghǎi Xìjù Xuéyuàn

Shanghai Theatre Academy (Chinese: 上海戏剧学院) is a municipal public college for dramatic art education in Shanghai, China. It is affiliated with the Shanghai Municipal People's Government.

== History ==
On December 1, 1945, the Shanghai Municipal Experimental Drama School (Chinese: 上海市立实验戏剧学校) was established, with Gu Zhongyi (Chinese: 顾仲彝) as the first principal, and in October 1949, the Shanghai Municipal Experimental Drama School was renamed the Shanghai Municipal Drama College.

In 1952, the national institutions of higher learning to implement departmental adjustment, Shandong University, Department of Fine Arts, Drama Division, Shanghai Xingzhi Art School Drama Group merged into the formal establishment of the school, renamed the Central Academy of Drama, East China Branch. In 1956, formally known as the Shanghai Theatre Academy, became the school under the direct supervision of the Ministry of Culture. In 2002 June, the former School of Performing Arts of Shanghai Normal University, the Shanghai Municipal School of Opera, the Shanghai Municipal School of Dance merged into the Shanghai Theatre Academy of Theatre and Dance Branch, the affiliated school of Opera and the attached School of Dance. Three campuses were formed (Huashan Road Campus, Lotus Road Campus, Hongqiao Road Campus).

== Famous alumni ==
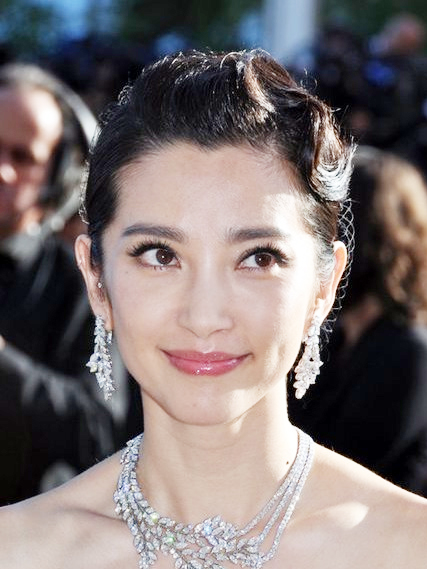
Li Bingbing, 2011

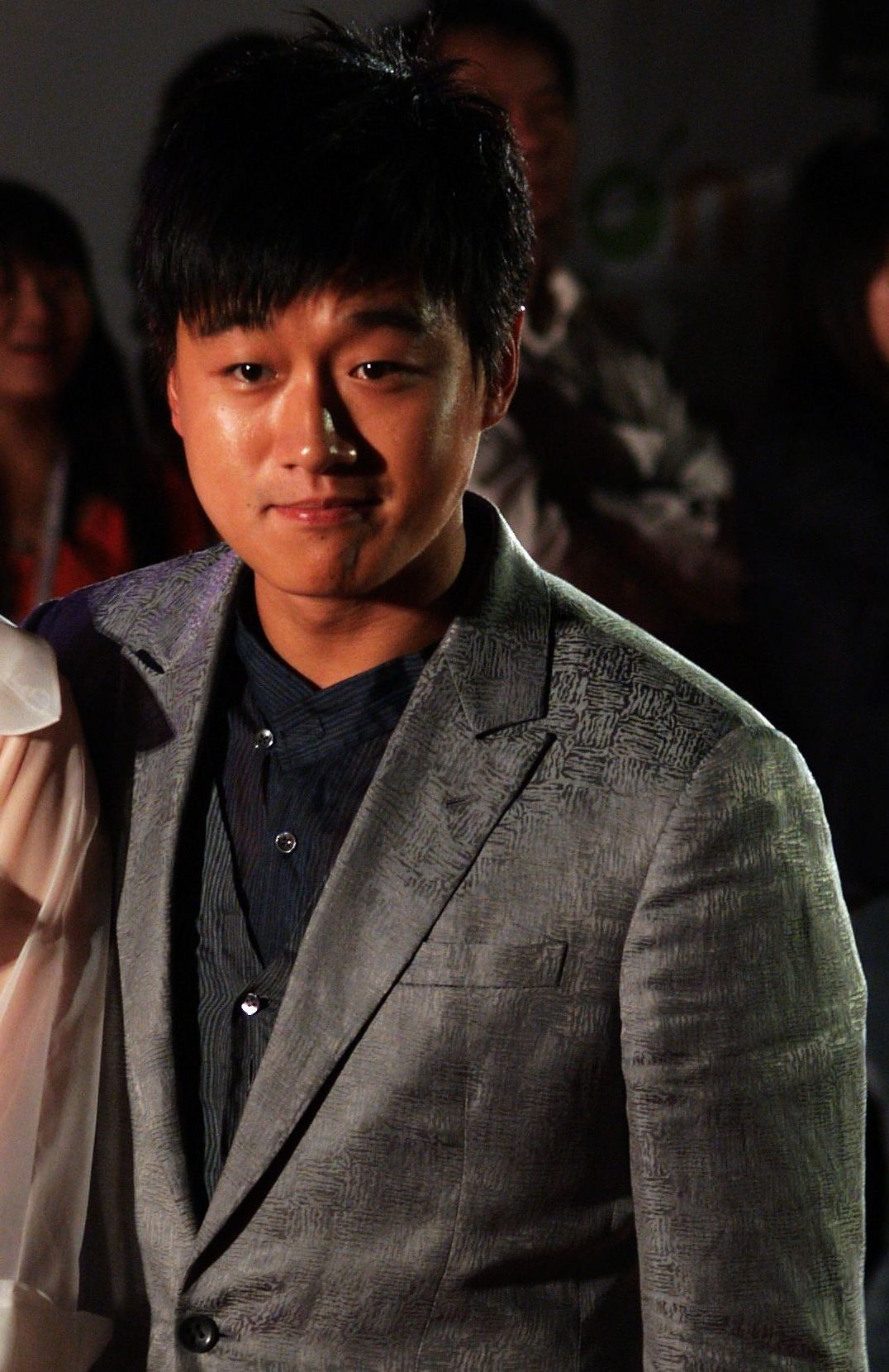
Tong Dawei, 2007

Class year indicates the entrance year, not graduating year.

- Class of 1952: Wang Fulin
- Class of 1974: Xu Xing
- Class of 1976: Pan Hong
- Class of 1980: Ding Jiali
- Class of 1981: Wang Luoyong, Song Jia
- Class of 1984: You Yong
- Class of 1985: Guo Donglin
- Class of 1986: Chen Hong
- Class of 1987: Liu Qiong, Wang Hui
- Class of 1989: Zhou Jie
- Class of 1990: Xu Zheng
- Class of 1993: Li Bingbing, Liao Fan, Li Yu
- Class of 1994: Ma Yili
- Class of 1995: Lu Yi, Li Qian, Wang Jingchun
- Class of 1996: Hao Lei, Nie Yuan, Chen Sicheng
- Class of 1997: Tong Dawei, Yan Yikuan, Feng Shaofeng, Yang Rong, Yu Zheng
- Class of 2000: Wan Qian
- Class of 2001: Hu Ge, Han Xue, Yuan Hong
- Class of 2002: Sun Yizhou, Monica Mok, Lei Jiayin
- Class of 2003: Xu Haiqiao
- Class of 2004: Jiang Shuying, Li Jinming, Zhao Ji, Zheng Kai, Chen He, Eric Wang, Du Jiang
- Class of 2005: Jin Shijia, Luo Yunxi
- Class of 2006: Li Jiahang, Lou Yixiao
- Class of 2007: Lin Gengxin, Purba Rgyal
- Class of 2008: Li Qin, Wang Yanlin
- Class of 2009: Jiang Jinfu, Zhang Zhehan
- Class of 2010: Dilraba Dilmurat, Merxat, Yuan Bingyan, Huang Shijia
- Class of 2011: Deng Lun
- Class of 2012: Elvis Han, Vin Zhang, Peng Yuchang, Xing Fei
- Class of 2014: Zhu Zhengting
- Class of 2015: Zeng Keni, Ding Yuxi
- Class of 2016: Qiu Xinyi, Tian Xiwei
- Class of 2017: Xia Zhiguang, Wang Churan
- Class of 2018: Gao Siwen
- Class of 2019: Sun Zhenni, Wu Junting
- Class of 2021: Lin Mo
