= IPartment =

Chinese television series

iPartment
- Genre: Sitcom; Comedy; Comedy drama
- Created by: Wei Zheng; Wang Yuan
- Starring: Chen He (Michael Chen); Lou Yixiao (Loura Lou); Jin Shijia (Kingscar Kim); Sun Yizhou (Sean Sun); Li Jinming (Kimi Li)
- Narrated by: Chen He (Michael Chen); Lou Yixiao (Loura Lou); Jin Shijia (Kingscar Kim); Sun Yizhou (Sean Sun); Li Jinming (Kimi Li)
- Opening theme: "My Future Styles" by Amber Kuo(Guo Caijie)
- Country of origin: China
- Original languages: Chinese; Japanese; English; Korean
- No. of seasons: 5
- No. of episodes: 124

Production
- Camera setup: Multi-camera
- Running time: 45 minutes
- Production company: Shanghai Media Distribution

Original release
- Network: Jiangxi TV (1); Guangdong TV (2); Dragon TV (2-4); Shandong Education TV (2); Ningxia TV (2); Anhui TV (3-4); Hubei TV (3-4); Shaanxi TV; Heilongjiang TV iQiyi
- Release: August 23, 2009 – February 18, 2020

iPartment (Chinese: 爱情公寓; pinyin: Àiqíng Gōngyù) is a Chinese sitcom. The first season debuted on Jiangxi TV in August 2009, and the final fifth season aired on iQiyi in 2020. A film adaptation, Love Apartment, was released in 2018. The show attracted high ratings but divided critics, mainly due to its plagiarism involving such sitcoms as Friends, How I Met Your Mother, and The IT Crowd. Some cast members, notably Wang Chuanjun, later distanced themselves from the show.

== Investors and Producers ==
The parent company of iPartment is a social networking site, known as "i-Part". It was founded by four Taiwanese, and its main investors are Japanese funds JAIC and CyberAgent

"iPartment" is invested by Love Apartment Company to promote the social networking site of the same name, produced by Shanghai Gaoge Culture Communication Co., Ltd., a TV series jointly produced by Shanghai Film Group, Gaoge Culture, and Xinjiadi Film and Television.

== Premise ==
The show details the lives of seven young adults in their mid-to-late 20s who are neighbors in an apartment complex in Shanghai, "iPartment," which was opened to young couples in love for heavily discounted prices by a wealthy philanthropist who was moved by a wedding.

== Cast ==
- Jin Shijia (Kim Jin) as Lu Zhanbo
- Zhao Ji (Evonne Zhao) as Lin Wanyu
- Chen He (Michael Chen) as Zeng Xiaoxian
- Lou Yixiao (Loura Lou) as Hu Yifei
- Sun Yizhou (Sean Sun) as Lü Ziqiao
- Li Jinming (Kimi Li) as Chen Meijia
- Wang Chuanjun (Eric Wang) as Sekiya Kamiki (Chinese: Guangu Shenqi)
- Deng Jiajia as Tang Youyou
- Li Jiahang (Jean Li) as Zhang Wei/Snake
- Zhao Wenqi (Vanessa Zhao) as Qin Yumo
- Rong Rong as Lisa Rong
- Kenichi Miura as Sekiya Kenjiro
- Cheng Guo (Loyce Cheng) as Zhuge Dali
- Wan Zilin (Catharine Wan) as Curry sauce
- Zhang Yiduo (Zac Zhang) as Zhao Haitang

== Episodes ==
Season	Episodes	Originally released	
Season	Episodes	First released	Last released
1	20	August 5, 2009	August 14, 2009
2	20	January 24, 2011	February 2, 2011
3	24	July 31, 2012	August 11, 2012
4	24	January 17, 2014	January 28, 2014
5	36	January 12, 2020	February 18, 2020

=== Season 1 (2009) ===
No. overall	No. in season	Title	Original release date
1	1	"Wedding Battle"	August 5, 2009
2	2	"The Super "Big" Scandal"	August 5, 2009
3	3	"March of Depression"	August 6, 2009
4	4	"The Revenge of Romance"	August 6, 2009
5	5	"Love Antidote"	August 7, 2009
6	6	"Fame In A Snap"	August 7, 2009
7	7	"Watching Porn"	August 8, 2009
8	8	"Mysterious Present"	August 8, 2009
9	9	"The Traffic Jam"	August 9, 2009
10	10	"Wa"	August 9, 2009
11	11	"It's A Small World"	August 10, 2009
12	12	"Life and Death"	August 10, 2009
13	13	"Memory Fragments"	August 11, 2009
14	14	"The Boring Weekend"	August 11, 2009
15	15	"The Halloween Fright"	August 12, 2009
16	16	"Gossip King"	August 12, 2009
17	17	"The Teller"	August 13, 2009
18	18	"You are Evil"	August 13, 2009
19	19	"Valentine : The Valentine Prelude"	August 14, 2009
20	20	"Valentine : The Last Valentine"	August 14, 2009

=== Season 2 (2011) ===
No. overall	No. in season	Title	Original release date
21	1	"I can Predict the Beginning, but I can't Predict the Ending"	January 24, 2011
22	2	"Drama Queen"	January 24, 2011
23	3	"I Am Legend"	January 25, 2011
24	4	"The Da Vina Code"	January 25, 2011
25	5	"Family"	January 26, 2011
26	6	"Raining With A Chance of Diamonds"	February 26, 2011
27	7	"In the Name of Love"	February 27, 2011
28	8	"The Drunk Angel"	February 27, 2011
29	9	"Dinner Party"	February 28, 2011
30	10	"The Festive Resurrection"	January 28, 2011
31	11	"The Conversion Fascination"	January 29, 2011
32	12	"The Best Actress"	January 29, 2011
33	13	"It's Not Father's Day"	January 30, 2011
34	14	"Hill of Hope: Cataclysm"	January 30, 2011
35	15	"The Secret Secret"	January 31, 2011
36	16	"The Story of the Single Woman"	January 31, 2011
37	17	"The Lady"	February 1, 2011
38	18	"The Boss"	February 1, 2011
39	19	"I'm Millionaire : The Beginning"	February 2, 2011
40	20	"I'm Millionaire : The End"	February 2, 2011

=== Season 3 (2012) ===
No. overall	No. in season	Title	Original release date
41	1	"I'm Millionaire : The New Beginning"	July 30, 2012
42	2	"Fusion of Sekiya and Ziqiao"	July 30, 2012
43	3	"Silent Night"	July 31, 2012
44	4	"This Is A Miracle : The Return"	July 31, 2012
45	5	"This Is A Miracle : Stay"	August 1, 2012
46	6	"Nice to Meet You"	August 1, 2012
47	7	"War of Proposals"	August 2, 2012
48	8	"2:30 A.M."	August 2, 2012
49	9	"The King's Scar : The Best Ending"	August 3, 2012
50	10	"The King's Scar : Life Is A Circle"	August 3, 2012
51	11	"Counter Strike"	August 4, 2012
52	12	"The Twist of Fate : Watching the Meteor Shower"	August 4, 2012
53	13	"The Twist of Fate: Moments We Share"	August 5, 2012
54	14	"The Scriptures from the Forbidden Summit"	August 5, 2012
55	15	"Social Network"	August 6, 2012
56	16	"No Ifs : The Break-Up and the Make-Up"	August 6, 2012
57	17	"No Ifs : The Truth and the Lie"	August 7, 2012
58	18	"No Ifs : The Prankster and the Pranked"	August 7, 2012
59	19	"My Girl"	August 8, 2012
60	20	"The True Lie"	August 8, 2012
61	21	"Flying Across the Mists of Mt. Creation : It's Night-Time, Close Your Eyes"	August 9, 2012
62	22	"Flying Across the Mists of Mt. Creation : It's the Morning, Open Your Eyes"	August 9, 2012
63	23	"The Matrix"	August 10, 2012
64	24	"Final Fantasy"	August 11, 2012

=== Season 4 (2014) ===
No. overall	No. in season	Title	Original release date
65	1	"There's Only One Truth"	January 17, 2014
66	2	"Who Said I'm Sick?"	January 17, 2014
67	3	"In the Name of Father"	January 18, 2014
68	4	"Roll, Zhanbo!"	January 18, 2014
69	5	"Inception"	January 19, 2014
70	6	"Flight 19"	January 19, 2014
71	7	"A Long River"	January 20, 2014
72	8	"Love Life"	January 20, 2014
73	9	"Cold War"	January 21, 2014
74	10	"Let Me Inspire You"	January 21, 2014
75	11	"Let's Be Friends, Richass"	January 22, 2014
76	12	"Escape Plan"	January 22, 2014
77	13	"The Bro Code"	January 23, 2014
78	14	"The Play (Part One)"	January 23, 2014
79	15	"The Play (Part Two)"	January 24, 2014
80	16	"Superhero"	January 24, 2014
81	17	"Bachelor's Weekend (Part One)"	January 25, 2014
82	18	"Bachelor's Weekend (Part Two)"	January 25, 2014
83	19	"Paladin of The Goddess"	January 26, 2014
84	20	"When Love Breaks In: Part One"	January 26, 2014
85	21	"When Love Breaks In: Part Two"	January 27, 2014
86	22	"The Forgiveness of the Goddess"	January 27, 2014
87	23	"If I Saw Them Again: Part One"	January 28, 2014
88	24	"If I Saw Them Again: Part Two"	January 28, 2014

=== Season 5 (2020) ===
No. overall	No. in season	Title	Original release date
89	1	"Next Level in Life"	January 12, 2020
90	2	"Vigorously Miracle"	January 12, 2020
91	3	"Most Kind Man"	January 12, 2020
92	4	"A Pear Blossom Pressed Begonia"	January 12, 2020
93	5	"My Treasure"	January 12, 2020
94	6	"Matchmaker's Curse"	January 12, 2020
95	7	"Where is Mika"	January 12, 2020
96	8	"Have Something to Say"	January 12, 2020
97	9	"Shopping Colors"	January 13, 2020
98	10	"Leave the Grass on the Table"	January 13, 2020
99	11	"I Cheer for You"	January 14, 2020
100	12	"Average Looking Glasses"	January 14, 2020
101	13	"Barrage Space"	January 19, 2020
102	14	"Awaken, Super Power!"	January 19, 2020
103	15	"The Ultimate Survival Test"	January 20, 2020
104	16	"Pig Apartment"	January 20, 2020
105	17	"Decoration Master"	January 21, 2020
106	18	"My Best Friend's Wedding (Part 1)"	January 21, 2020
107	19	"My Best Friend's Wedding (Part 2)"	January 26, 2020
108	20	"Best Gift"	January 26, 2020
109	21	"New Dating Era"	January 27, 2020
110	22	"A Good Show"	January 27, 2020
111	23	"Desperate to Live"	January 28, 2020
112	24	"Desperate Express"	January 28, 2020
113	25	"Your Name"	January 28, 2020
114	26	"Legal Family"	January 28, 2020
115	27	"Win at the Starting Line"	January 28, 2020
116	28	"Plan B"	January 28, 2020
117	29	"League of Keepers"	January 28, 2020
118	30	"I Have a Date With AI"	January 28, 2020
119	31	"Simulated Family"	January 28, 2020
120	32	"True Love Travels Around"	January 28, 2020
121	33	"Meet My Mother-in-Law"	January 28, 2020
122	34	"Laughter in Heart"	January 28, 2020
123	35	"WeChat War"	January 28, 2020
124	36	"Finally Married"	January 28, 2020

== Summary ==
=== Season 1 ===
There are seven young adults who have different backgrounds, ideals, and identities, that live in an unlike apartment. Hu Yifei is a PhD graduate who lectures at a university and lives with her stepbrother Lu Zhanbo and late-night talk show host Zeng Xiaoxian. After Zhanbo graduates from MIT, he meets a girl, Lin Wanyu, who is the daughter of a billionaire banker. Wanyu ran away from home to avoid her engagement, so she moves into iPartment. The apartment owner sets a rule: if a couple moves in, they only pay half rent and do not need to pay for utilities. Lu Ziqiao and Chen Meijia try to save money by pretending to be a couple and move into iPartment. The rent is still expensive for them, so they find a Japanese cartoonist, Sekiya Kamiki, to move in with them.

=== Season 2 ===
Three new residents move into the apartment: Zhang Wei, Tang Youyou, and Qin Yumo.

=== Season 3 ===
After the grand prize, Xiaoxian continues to live with in iPartment. He buys the bar and becomes the owner. Meijia returns with a man when the residents celebrate the opening of Xiaoxian's bar. Kamiki and Youyou fall in love. After Zhanbo and Wanyu traveled around the world, Zhanbo formally proposes to Wanyu, who refuses. Wanyu leaves iPartment to go to Italy to chase her dream.

=== Season 4 ===
Xiaoxian and Yifei's careers become successful on their work place. Although Ziqiao and Meijia get back together again, Ziqiao continues hitting on other girls. Kamiki's business is getting better, but it does not fix his relationship with Youyou.

=== Season 5 ===
The iPartment residents have achieved their goals.

== Behind-the-scenes ==
When filming the kissing scene, because both Wang Chuanjun and Deng Jiajia were shy, many clips were filmed for that scene (the second season).

There is a scene where Wang Chuanjun needs to scare Hu Ge and make him afraid. As long as Hu Ge leaned back, he jumped on the water basin in an exaggerated way to paint (the fourth season).

Deng Jiajia revealed that Hu Ge is a person without the burden of being an idol. In the play, he can play ugly and wretched, and he can do anything (the fourth season).

When Hu Ge first read the script, he immediately fell in love with Dino, a particularly controversial role. Even the director hesitated: "He played this role too badly for his image" (season four).

Wei Zheng has relatively high requirements for the scene, and he can't pass a dozen or twenty shots. The actor refused to get up in the morning, so Wei Zheng asked someone to pry into his room door.

Most of the clothes of the actors in the love apartment are bought by themselves. The costume set only provided a small selection, so each actor would buy a lot.

Zhao Ji was very scared when driving the tractor and filming. She was trying to force a smile and make various actions. When the weather in Shanghai was the hottest, Zhao Ji was tanned after wearing one, and she was sunburned the next day.

The role that the director asked Chen He to audition for was not "Zeng Xiaoxian", but "Lu Zhanbo". But when Chen He read the lines of a good man, he was destined to play the role of "Zeng Xiaoxian".

Teacher Zeng's lines are always long and long. When Chen He forgets his words, he will use Teacher Zeng's signature laughter to delay time to think of words.

Wang Chuanjun was once punished by plugging ears with cucumbers because of too much laughter and affecting other people to enter the role.

Sun Yizhou will do 20 push-ups before each nude scene.

In the winter of December, Lou Yixiao voluntarily asked to re-shoot the water-splashing scene many times because she was dissatisfied with her shooting.

In the finale, the scene where Lu Ziqiao had a room with his sister in the name of Lu Zhanbo was actually filmed in the private room of the five-star hotel. The original script did not soak in the bathtub, but the director went to the private room and thought the bathtub was good, so he filmed in the bathtub. The scene was filmed for six hours, and Sun Yizhou was soaked in the water for six hours .

The subject of Lou Yixiao's audition was the "wedding" scene at the very beginning of iPartment. Due to the many roles, she could only dance in the air. Even she herself thought she was a lunatic at first glance.

== Reception ==
"Love Apartment" presents love stories in the form of sitcoms. The witty and humorous language, the lively rhythm, and the novel and unique expression techniques suit the appreciation taste of college students, and the discussion of propositions such as love, friendship, and life hit the hearts of college students. The play has the obvious feature of "episodic narrative", that is, the stories broadcast in the episodes are not coherent. The whole play is run through by several fixed main characters, each episode has an independent and complete plot, and there is no obstacle to watch from any episode. ("Guangming Daily" review)

"Love Apartment" not only has charismatic characters and more fashionable and vivid lines, but also has more diversity and integrity in the setting of the scene. The use of all new cast members also allows the audience to see the whole scene in front of them while gaining a fresh feeling. Bright performance. (Sina Online Review)

"Love Apartment 2" is bolder in terms of story material, and its rhythm is more compact and smooth than the first season. At the same time, "Love Apartment 2" added more popular elements and time-travel scenes.

"Love Apartment 3" triggered the "idol" era of sitcoms. In terms of quality, "Love Apartment 3" is better than the first two. It not only introduces a large number of novel plots by rearranging the story clues of several protagonists, but also has various imaginations in the techniques. Enrich the viewing experience. "Love Apartment 3" can be said to be more intoxicated in nonsensical jokes, basically only netizens and audiences can understand. ("Jinghua Times" review)

The humorous and modern comedy style of "Love Apartment 4" is deeply loved by audiences of all walks of life. The witty, humorous and contemporary lines in the play have become popular online expressions for young people. (Tencent Entertainment Review)

Produced by Beijing iQiyi Technology Co., Ltd. and Huacekton's Syndicate Film and Television, directed by Wei Zheng, starring Lou Yixiao, Li Jiahang, Sun Yizhou, Li Jinming, starring Zhang Yiduo, Guo Guo, Wan Zilin, and Chen He's special starring urban sitcom " Love Apartment 5" ended on February 11 at iQIYI VIP members. As the final season of the "Love Apartment" series, "Love 5" not only continues the classics to provide fans with emotional satisfaction, but also boldly innovates to bring surprise viewing experience to the audience, drawing a perfect end to ten years of youthful companionship.

Much criticism has been directed towards the reuse of jokes and settings from American sitcoms such as Friends, How I Met Your Mother, The Big Bang Theory and The War at Home.

As for the comments from netizens, the director said that the creation of "Love Apartment" was indeed deeply influenced by the style of American dramas, incorporating many elements of American dramas, but the story is completely different from "Friends". However, director Wei Zheng also admitted that the play did borrow from "Friends", and believed that "only if there is imitation, can there be a chance to surpass" . In addition to the ambiguity between several young people and the development of love, "Love Apartment" also pays more attention to the combination of young people's life and popular topics . However, some lawyers responded to the explanations given by the screenwriter and director of the play, saying that "referencing" is not an excuse for infringement.

== Awards and nominations ==
Year	Award	Category	Nominated work	Result
2013	5th China TV Drama Awards	Most Popular Television Series		Won
2014	6th China TV Drama Awards	Top Ten Television Series		Won
2014	6th China TV Drama Awards	Most Appealing Young Actor	Michael Chen	Won
