= Chen He =

Chinese actor

- 陈赫
- Born: 9 November 1985 (age 40); Changle District, Fuzhou, Fujian, China
- Other name: Michael Chen
- Education: Shanghai Theatre Academy
- Occupation: Actor
- Years active: 2009–present
- Agent: Mountain Top
- Spouses: Xu Jing (m. 2013–2014) Zhang Zixuan (m. 2016)
- Children: 2
- Parent: Hu Xiaoling (mother)
- Relatives: Uncle (or first cousins once removed): Chen Kaige

Chinese name
- Simplified Chinese: 陈赫
- Traditional Chinese: 陳赫
Transcriptions
Standard Mandarin
- Hanyu Pinyin: Chén Hè

Chen He (Chinese: 陈赫; born 9 November 1985), also known as Michael Chen, is a Chinese actor, best known for his role as Zeng Xiaoxian in the sitcom IPartment and as a cast member of Keep Running, the Chinese version of Running Man. Chen ranked 69th on Forbes China Celebrity 100 list in 2015, 54th in 2017, and 100th in 2019.

== Career ==
Chen was born on 9 November 1985 in Changle District, Fuzhou. He is the son of Hu Xiaoling (胡小玲), an actress. Chen's uncle is Chen Kaige, a noted Chinese director. Chen graduated from Shanghai Theatre Academy in 2008, majoring in acting.

In 2009, Chen starred in a sitcom IPartment, which became a major hit in China.

In 2014, Chen took part in the Chinese version of the Korean Running Man.

== Personal life ==
In September 2013, Chen married high school sweetheart Xu Jing (许婧; 許婧; Xǔ Jìng) in Phuket Island, Thailand. Xu is a graduate of University of Auckland.

In 2016, Chen married actress Zhang Zixuan. On 23 October, their daughter was born.

== Filmography ==
=== Film ===
Year	English title	Chinese title	Role	Notes/Ref.
2014	Love on the Cloud	微爱之渐入佳境	Sha Guo	
2014	Fleet of Time	匆匆那年	Su Kai	
2015	Running Man	奔跑吧兄弟	Himself	
2015	Jian Bing Man	煎饼侠	Cameo	
2015	Love in the Office	一路向前	Niu Dun	
2015	Detective Chinatown	唐人街探案	Huang Landeng	
2016	Everybody's Fine	一切都好	Guan Hao	
2016	The New Year's Eve of Old Lee	过年好	Ran Ran's father	Cameo
2016	Super Express	超级快递	Mali	
2016	When Larry Met Mary	陆垚知马俐		Cameo
2016	Mr. Nian	年兽大作战		
2017	The Founding of an Army	建军大业	Si Li	
2018	Love Apartment	爱情公寓	Zeng Xiaoxian	
2018	Mad Ebriety	断片儿		Cameo
2021	Hi, Mom	你好，李焕英	Leng Te	

=== Television series ===
Year	English title	Chinese title	Role	Notes/Ref.
2009	IPartment	爱情公寓	Zeng Xiaoxian	
2010	Days with the Air Hostess	和空间一起的日子	Cheng Xiaohe	
2011	IPartment 2	爱情公寓2	Zeng Xiaoxian	
2011	Waking Love Up	爱情睡醒了	Zeng Xiaoxian	Cameo
2012	IPartment 3	爱情公寓3	Zeng Xiaoxian	
2012	My Father's Love	老爸的爱情	Leng Leilei	
2013	Love Destiny	爱情自有天意	Tang Li / Tang Guanzhong	
2013	Longmen Express	龙门镖局	Yi Jigao	Cameo
2014	IPartment 4	爱情公寓4	Zeng Xiaoxian	
2014	Love is Back	爱情回来了	Gao Jian	
2014	The Young Doctor	青年医生	Zhang Jun	Cameo
2015	Monthly	月供	He Shaoyong	
2015	Laughter Medical Center	医馆笑传	Doctor Zhu	
2015	Three Dads	三个奶爸	Zhang Yinan	
2016	Legend of Ace	极品家丁	Lin San	
2017	Master Healing	复合大师	Lin Youyang	Cameo
2019	The Neighbour is My Ex-Wife	我的冤家住对门	Pan Xiangdong	
2019	Bureau of Transformer	动物管理局	Chi Yun	
2020	iPartment 5	爱情公寓5	Zeng Xiaoxian	
2020	Sniper	瞄准	Chi Tiecheng	
2020	Happy Hunter	欢喜猎人	Brother O	
2021	Medal of the Republic	功勋	Li Chengying	
2021		做梦吧！晶晶		
2021	New Generation: Emergency Rescue	我们的新时代	Zhao Xiaofei	

=== Variety show ===
Year	English title	Chinese title	Role	Notes
2014–2018	Keep Running	奔跑吧兄弟	Cast member	

== Discography ==
Year	English title	Chinese title	Notes
2012	"Love Apartment"	爱情公寓	iPartment 3 OST
2013	"A Gift That Cries"	会哭的礼物	Love Destiny OST
2013	"Fool"	傻瓜傻	Love Destiny OST
2015		少年三国志	Theme song of mobile game 少年三国志
2015	"A Letter of Home"	一封家书	Everybody's Fine OST
2016	"Super Hero"	超级英雄	Theme song of Hurry Up, Brother
2016	"Super Express"	超级快递	Super Express OST
2018	"Youth is Different"	青春不一样	—N/a
