= Wang Chuanjun =

Chinese actor (born 1985)

- 王传君
- Born: October 18, 1985 (age 41); Shanghai, China
- Other name: Eric Wang
- Education: Shanghai Theatre Academy
- Occupations: Actor; singer; host
- Years active: 2007–present

Chinese name
- Traditional Chinese: 王傳君
- Simplified Chinese: 王传君
Transcriptions
Standard Mandarin
- Hanyu Pinyin: Wāng Chuánjūn

Wang Chuanjun (Chinese: 王传君; born 18 October 1985), also known as Eric Wang, is a Chinese actor. Wang rose to prominence for his role as Sekitani Kamiya in the sitcom iPartment, which attracted high ratings but divided critics, largely due to allegations of plagiarism. Wang later distanced himself from the series, declining to appear in its film adaptation and final season. His film credits include Dying to Survive and No More Bets.

== Early life ==
Wang, born in Shanghai on October 18, 1985, graduated from Shanghai Theatre Academy with a major in acting. He participated in Dragon TV's reality program My Hero as a contestant.

== Filmography ==
=== Film ===
Year	English title	Chinese title	Role	Notes/Ref.
2001	Eyes of a Beauty	西施眼	Hao Bo	
2012	Happy Adventure	开心大冒险		Cameo
2012	Fearless	热血街头	Li Ke	
2013	Sweet Summer Love	夏日示爱	Lou Hao	
2013	Mysterious Island 2	孤岛惊魂2		
2014	Bugs	食人虫		
2015	Fly Me to Venus	星语心愿之再爱	Wang Pengpeng	
2015	Uncover Duet	猛龍特囧	He Yongyi	
2015	Ex-Files 2	前任2：备胎反击战	Tian Shengxin	
2016	The Wasted Times	罗曼蒂克消亡史	Ma Zai	
2017	Love Is a Broadway Hit	情遇曼哈顿	Tony	
2018	Dying to Survive	我不是药神	Lü Shouyi	Changchun Film Festival - Best Supporting Actor; China Film Director's Guild Awards - Best Actor
2019	Saturday Fiction	兰心大剧院		
2023	Hidden Blade	無名	Captain Wang	
2023	No More Bets	孤注一掷	Lu Bingkun	
2023	The Volunteers: To the War	志愿军：雄兵出击	Qiao Guanhua	
2024	A Place Called Silence	默杀	Lin Zaifu	
2025	She’s Got No Name	酱园弄		
2025	Dead to Rights	南京照相馆	Wang Guanghai	
2025	Mothertongue	春树	Wang Dongdong	
	Forever Young	不老奇事		
	Lost in Ganga	故人如梦		
	English	英格力士		
	Mosaic Portrait	马赛克少女		
	Moerdao	莫尔道嘎		

=== Television series ===
Year	English title	Chinese title	Role	Notes/Ref.
2007	Thank You for Having Loved Me	谢谢你曾经爱过我		Cameo
2008	IPartment	爱情公寓	Sekitani Kamiya	
2009	Mystery File	迷案记	Zheng Tian	
2009	Prince of Tennis	加油！网球王子	Qian Zhenzhi	
2010	Super Idol	超级偶像	Jiao Xiaoming	
2010	Go La La Go!	杜拉拉升职记	Sheng Tianjiao	
2010	Legend of IPartment	爱情公寓外传	Sekitani Kamiya	
2011	Utopia Office	乌托邦办公室	Su Ge	
2011	IPartment 2	爱情公寓2	Sekitani Kamiya	
2012	Say That You Love Me	爱情是从告白开始的	Han Fei	
2012	IPartment 3	爱情公寓3	Sekitani Kamiya	
2014	IPartment 4	爱情公寓4	Sekitani Kamiya	
2014	Love Is Back	爱情回来了	Fang Siqi	
2014	Girl in Icebox	冰箱少女	Sima Dongping	
2014	Mysterious Summer	不可思议的夏天	Zhou Yi	
2015	Laughter Medical Center	医馆笑传	Yang Yuxuan	
2015	Miss Unlucky	乌鸦嘴妙女郎	Qiao Yijiao	
2016	The Fox Fairy Court	大仙衙门	Wang Yuanfeng	
2017	The Times We Had	国民大生活	Mr. Chen	Cameo
