= Sun Yizhou =

Chinese actor

- 孙艺洲
- Born: October 23, 1983 (age 42); Chengdu, Sichuan, China
- Other name: Sean Sun
- Education: Shanghai Theatre Academy
- Occupation: Actor
- Years active: 2009–present
- Agent: Mountain Top
- Spouse: Cao Xiaowen (m. 2009)

Chinese name
- Traditional Chinese: 孫藝洲
- Simplified Chinese: 孙艺洲
Transcriptions
Standard Mandarin
- Hanyu Pinyin: Sūn Yìzhōu

Sun Yizhou (Chinese: 孙艺洲, born 23 October 1983), also known as Sean Sun, is a Chinese actor.

== Early life and education ==
Sun was born in Chengdu, Sichuan on October 23, 1983. He graduated from Shanghai Theatre Academy, majoring in acting.

== Career ==
Sun made his acting debut in the 2007 television series Embroiderer Lan Xin.

In 2009, Sun rose to fame for his role in the sitcom iPartment, which enjoyed explosive popularity in China and spanned several seasons.

In 2012, he starred in his first idol drama, Confession of Love From the Start.

In 2014, Sun starred in Scarlet Heart 2, the modern sequel of popular historical drama Scarlet Heart. He won his first award for acting at the China TV Drama Awards the same year.

In 2017, Sun starred in the historical romance drama General and I, which had high ratings in China.

In 2019, Sun starred in the spy drama Awakening of Insects.

== Personal life ==
On September 9, 2009, Sun married his university classmate Cao Xiaowen (曹晓雯).

== Filmography ==
=== Film ===
Year	English title	Chinese title	Role	Notes/Ref.
2015	Crazy New Year's Eve	一路驚喜	Xiao Zhao	
2015	You Are My Sunshine	何以笙箫默	Supermarket manager	Cameo
2015	Forever Love	北京时间	Wang Xiaomo	
2017	This Is Not What I Expected	喜歡·你	Xiao Meng	
2018	The Faces of My Gene	祖宗十九代	Host	Cameo
2018	Love Apartment	爱情公寓	Lü Ziqiao	
2021	Under the Light	坚如磐石		

=== Television series ===
Year	English title	Chinese title	Role	Notes/Ref.
2006	Youth and Future	青春未来	Jiang Chuan	
2007	Embroiderer Lan Xin	绣娘兰馨	A Lang	
2007	The Sword and the Chess of Death	魔剑生死棋	Jian Yin	
2008	No.36 Beach Bar	36号沙滩酒吧	Li Da'ning	
2009	iPartment	爱情公寓	Lü Ziqiao	
2009	The Story of My Boss	老板这点事	Xu Wenqiang	
2010	The Legend of Lin Daiyu	黛玉传	Jia Yun	
2011	Shanghai Case in 1937	上海迷案1937	Shi Yuquan	
2011	Qian Duoduo Marry Remember	钱多多嫁人记	Ma Wen	
2011	iPartment 2	爱情公寓2	Lü Ziqiao	
2011	Every Day 2008	天天2088	Huo Xiaoyu	
2012	iPartment 3	爱情公寓3	Lü Ziqiao	
2012	Confession of Love From the Start	爱情是从告白开始的	Ou Haochen	
2012	Refresh	刷新3+7	A Yong	
2013	The Princess	全民公主	Yu Zihao	
2014	iPartment 4	爱情公寓4	Lü Ziqiao	
2014	Scarlet Heart 2	步步惊情	Kang Sihan	
2015		奇葩一家亲	Tang Liqiu	
2015	The Gossip Girl	米粒向前冲	Qian Kang	
2015	The Legend of Qin	秦时明月	Wei Zhuang	
2015	Women on the Breadfruit Tree	面包树上的女人	Du Weiping	
2016	First Love	柠檬初上	Zheng Lei	
2016	The Fatal Mission	怒江之战	Zhao Benkuo	
2017	General and I	孤芳不自赏	He Xia	
2017	Two Idiots	废柴兄弟5泰爽	Zhan Wu	
2019	Awakening of Insects	惊蛰	Zhou Haichao	
2020	iPartment 5	爱情公寓5	Lu Ziqiao	
2020	Like a Flowing River 2	大江大河2	Xiao Ran	Guest role
2021	Astringent Girl	涩女郎	Li Wen Sen	
2021	Good Life	生活万岁	Zeng Zhidong	
2023	Gone with the Rain		Chen Wende	
2024	Growing Pains of Swordsmen	欢乐英雄	Wang Dong	
2024	The House of 72 Tenants		Peter Ma / Xiao Pi Jiang	
TBA	Secret Keepers	绝密者	Gu Ying Ze	
TBA	Prosecutor and Boy		Luo Bai Ming	

== Awards and nominations ==
Year	Award	Category	Nominated work	Result	Ref.
2014	6th China TV Drama Awards	Most Promising Actor	Scarlet Heart 2	Won	
2020	11th China TV Drama Awards	Rising Actor	—N/a	Won	
