= Li Jiahang =

Chinese actor

- Born: Anshan, Liaoning, China
- Other name: Jean Lee
- Occupation: Actor
- Years active: 2008–present
- Agent: Tongle Entertainment Culture
- Spouse: Li Sheng (m. 2014)
- Children: 1

Li Jiahang
- Chinese: 李佳航
Transcriptions
Standard Mandarin
- Hanyu Pinyin: Lǐ Jiāháng

Li Jiahang (Chinese: 李佳航; pinyin: Lǐ Jiāháng) is a Chinese actor.

== Life and career ==
Li Jiahang was born in Anshan, Liaoning. He graduated from Shanghai Theatre Academy in 2010. In New My Fair Princess, he played the role of Fu Erkang. He then starred in the sitcom iPartment playing the role of a young and unfortunate lawyer.

== Filmography ==
=== Film ===
Year	English title	Chinese title	Role	Notes/Ref.
2003	Scratches Years	划痕岁月	Hooligan	
2009	Don’t Cry, My Beloved	別哭,我心愛的	Lin Xiaoyang	
2013	Dating Fever	我為相親狂	Zhao Shuai	
2013	The Love Experience	有招没招之爱情达人	Shi Sheng	
2015	Go Lala Go 2	杜拉拉追婚记	Ah Le	
2015	Forever Young	栀子花开	Doctor	Cameo
2017	Sky Hunter	空天猎	Liu Haocheng	
2018	Love Apartment	愛情公寓	Zhang Wei	
2021	Be Yourself	机智的上半场	Mai Meng	

=== Television series ===
Year	English title	Chinese title	Role	Notes/Ref.
2008	Golden Warrior	金甲战士	Shao Chongtian	
2009	iPartment	愛情公寓	Zhang Wei	Cameo
2011	iPartment 2	愛情公寓2	Zhang Wei	
2011	New My Fair Princess	新还珠格格	Fu Erkang	
2012	iPartment 3	愛情公寓3	Zhang Wei	Cameo
2012	Home, Sweet Home	我家有喜	Lin Yongxiong	
2012	Amy Go	艾米加油	Zhang Heping	
2013	Longmen Express	龙门镖局	Jia Qian	Cameo
2013	Enjoy My Life	快乐ELIFE	Zheng Yidi	Cameo
2014	iPartment 4	愛情公寓4	Zhang Wei	
2014	Coco Soul	腾空的日子	Jiang Baichuan	
2014	Young Sherlock	少年神探狄仁杰	Zhu Xiangyuan	
2015		奋囧	Lu Xiaochun	
2015	Say No For Youth	天生要完美	Cai Mi	
2015	Ladies and Boys	淑女涩男	Zhao Xiaomai	Cameo
2015	Legend of Ban Shu	班淑傳奇	Deng Zhi	
2015		爱情上上签	She Jian	Cameo
2016	Mad About You	新婚公寓	Xiao Xiaojun	
2016	Singing All Along	秀麗江山之長歌行	Feng Yi	
2016	Laughter Medical Center	医馆笑传2	Zhu Yipin	
2016	The Flame of Youth	尖锋之烈焰青春	Gu Xing	
2017	Surgeons	外科风云	Chen Shaocong	
2017	Invincible Daddy	熊爸熊孩子	You Yong	
2018	Partners	合伙人	Wang Zi	
2018	Strategy	兵临棋下	Jiang Nianhua	Cameo
2018	Born In 70s	生于70年代	Yang Fan	
2019	The Liar Hunter	读心	Zhuang Zhong	
2020	iPartment 5	爱情公寓5	Zhang Wei	
2020	Customer First	猎心者	Dai Meng	
2020	Young Army Officers	尉官正年轻	Xu Xiaobin	
2021	A Little Dilemma	小舍得	Yan Peng	
2021	The Lord of Losers	破事精英		
2021	The Bond	乔家的儿女	Qiao Weimin	
