= Young Justice Bao =

Singaporean legal drama TV series

- Traditional Chinese: 俠義包公
- Simplified Chinese: 侠义包公
- Literal meaning: The Heroic and Gallant Judge Bao
- Hanyu Pinyin: Xiá Yì Bāo Gōng
- Starring: Chew Chor Meng; Zhang Xinxiang; Chen Hanwei; Eugena Lee; Cherie Lim
- Opening theme: "Pei Ni Dao Tianya" (陪你到天涯) by Huang An
- Ending theme: "Jiu Yinyuan" (救姻緣) by Huang An
- Country of origin: Singapore
- Original language: Mandarin
- No. of episodes: 25

Original release
- Network: Television Corporation of Singapore
- Release: 1994 – 1994

Young Justice Bao (Simplified Chinese: 侠义包公) is a 25-episode ancient legal drama series produced by the Television Corporation of Singapore in 1994. The drama stars Chew Chor Meng as the legendary Song Dynasty jurist Bao Zheng.

== Cast ==
- Chew Chor Meng as Bao Zheng
- Chen Hanwei as Bai Yutang
- Zhang Xinxiang as Zhan Zhao
- Eugena Lee as Li Ke
- Cherie Lim as Li Jue
- Chen Shucheng as Li Wenye
- Richard Low as Imperial Tutor Pang
- Fu Youming as Pang Yu
- Chen Tianwen as Di Qing
- Wang Guanwu as Emperor Renzong of Song
- Zhou Shiqiang as Wen Yanbo
- Zhu Yuye as Empress Dowager Liu
- Liang Tian as Guo Huai
- Lin Xiulian as Kou Zhu
- Huang Shaoting as Consort Li
- Yang Tianfu as Wang Chao
- Wu Kaishen as Ma Han
- Lin Qinyuan as Fan Zonghua
- Li Yuejie as Yelü Xiong
- Li Yinzhu as Xiao Yanyan
