= Bao Zheng =

11th-century Chinese politician and cultural personification of justice

Justice Bao (包青天; pinyin: Bāo qīngtiān) Bao Zheng
- 包拯
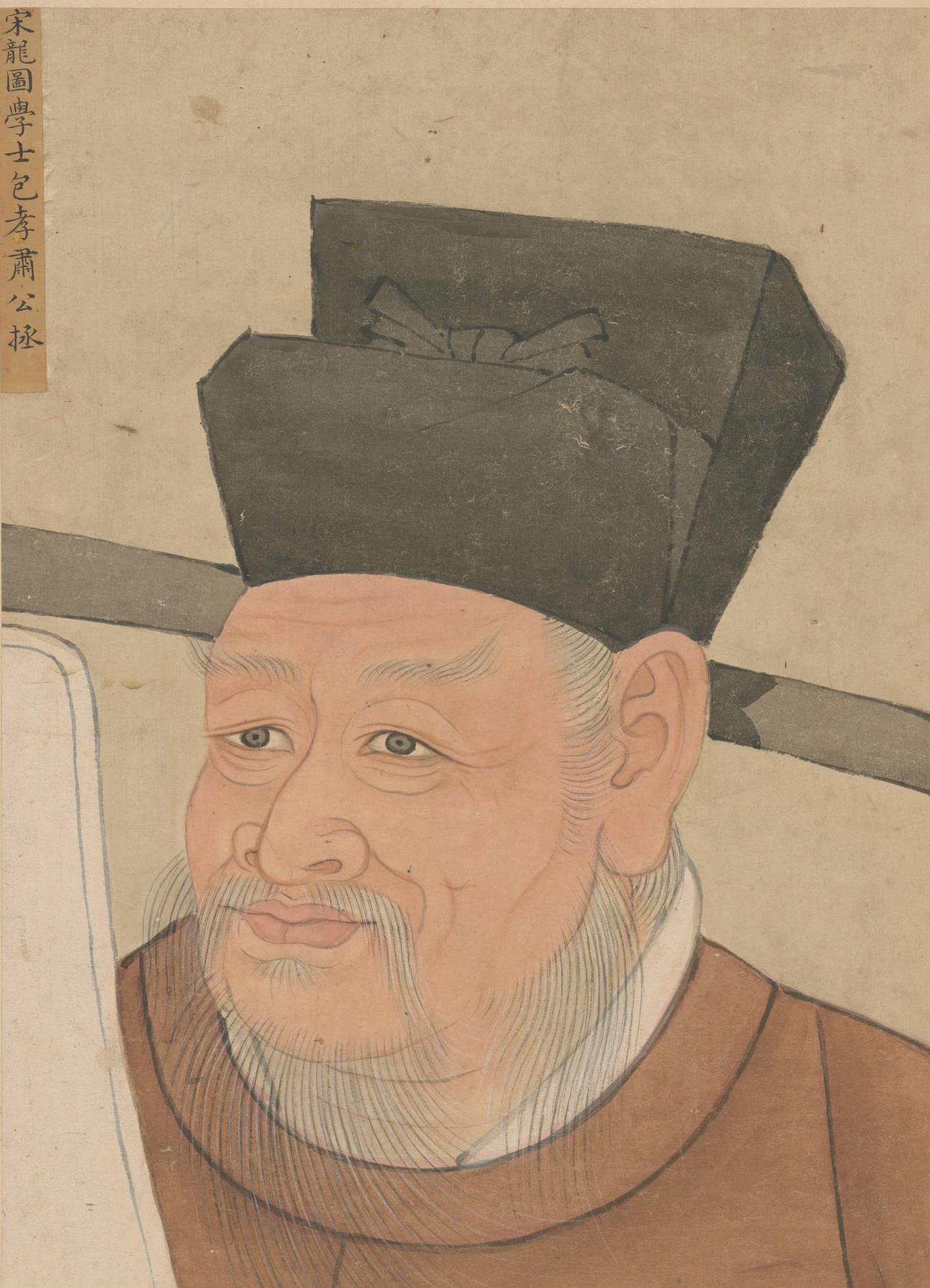

Personal details
- Born: 5 March 999 Shenxian, Hefei, Luzhou, Northern Song
- Died: 3 July 1062 (aged 63) Kaifeng, Northern Song
- Resting place: Baogong Cemetery, Luyang District, Hefei, Anhui, China; 31°51′27.17″N 117°17′56.39″E
- Spouses: Lady Zhang (張氏); Lady Dong (董氏)
- Domestic partner: Lady Sun (孙氏)
- Children: Bao Yi (son), with Lady Dong; 2 daughters, with Lady Dong; Bao Shou (son), with Lady Sun
- Parent: Bao Lingyi (father)
- Education: Jinshi
- Occupation: Politician & Imperial General Inspector
- Known for: Chinese cultural personification of justice
- Full name: Surname: Bāo (包); Given name: Zhěng (拯); Courtesy name: Xīrén (希仁); Posthumous name: Xiàosù (孝肅)
- Other names: Bao Wenzheng (包文正); Bao Xiren (包希仁); Bao Gong (包公); Bao Qingtian (包青天); Bao Longtu (包龙图); Bao Fu Qiansui (包府千岁); Yanluo Tianzi (阎罗天子); Bao Heizi (包黑子); Bao Heitan (包黑炭)

Bao Zheng

Chinese name
- Chinese: 包拯
Transcriptions
Standard Mandarin
- Hanyu Pinyin: Bāo Zhěng
- Wade–Giles: Pao^{1} Cheng^{3}
Yue: Cantonese
- Yale Romanization: Baau^{1} Ching^{2}
- Jyutping: Baau^{1} Cing^{2}
Southern Min
- Hokkien POJ: Pau Chín
Eastern Min
- Fuzhou BUC: Bău Cīng

Vietnamese name
- Vietnamese: Bao Công; Bao Chửng
- Chữ Hán: 包拯

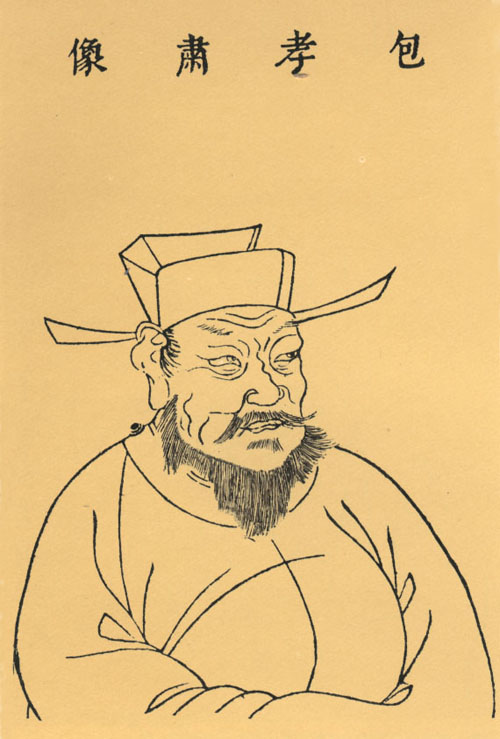
Bao Zheng as depicted in the Sancai Tuhui (1609)

Bao Zheng (包拯; Bāo Zhěng; 5 March 999 – 3 July 1062), commonly known as Bao Gong (包公; Bāo Gōng; 'Lord Bao'), was a Chinese politician during the reign of Emperor Renzong in China's Song Dynasty. During his twenty-five years in civil service, Bao was known for his honesty and uprightness, with actions such as impeaching an uncle of Emperor Renzong's favourite concubine and punishing powerful families. His appointment from 1057 to 1058 as the prefect of Song's capital Kaifeng, where he initiated a number of changes to better hear the grievances of the people, made him a legendary figure. During his years in office, he gained the honorific title Justice Bao (Chinese: 包青天; pinyin: Bāo qīngtiān) due to his ability to defend peasants and commoners against corruption or injustice. Bao Zheng is depicted as the incarnation of the Astral God of Civil Arts (Wenquxing, 文曲星), while famous Northern Song warrior Di Qing is depicted as the Astral God of Military Arts (Wuquxing, 武曲星).

Bao Zheng today is honored as the cultural symbol of justice in Chinese society. His largely fictionalized gong'an and wuxia stories have appeared in a variety of different literary and dramatic mediums (beginning with The Seven Heroes and Five Gallants), and have enjoyed sustained popularity. In mainstream Chinese mythology, he is often portrayed wearing a judge's zhanjiao futou hat and a crescent moon on his forehead. Some Chinese provinces later deified Judge Bao, equating him to the benevolent war god Guan Gong.

== Early life ==
Bao Zheng was born into a scholar family in Shenxian (慎县), Hefei, Luzhou (present-day Feidong County near Hefei, Anhui). Bao's family was in the middle class, his father Bao Lingyi (包令仪) was a scholar and an official, while his grandfather Bao Shi Tong (包士通) was a commoner. Though Bao's parents could afford to send him to school, his mother had to climb up mountains to collect firewood just before she gave birth to him. As Bao grew up among low working class, he well understood people's hardships, hated corruption and strongly desired for justice.

At the age of 29, Bao passed the highest-level imperial examination and became qualified as a Jinshi. Bao was appointed as magistrate of Jianchang County, but he deferred embarking on his official career for a decade in order to care for his elderly parents and faithfully observe proper mourning rites after their deaths.

During the time Bao looked after his parents at home, Liu Yun (刘赟), Magistrate of Luzhou who was renowned as an excellent poetic and fair-minded officer, usually visited Bao. Because the two got along well, Bao obtained great influence from Liu Yun in respect of the love for people.

== As magistrate of Tianchang ==
After the passing of his parents, Bao Zheng, then 39, was appointed magistrate of Tianchang County not far from his hometown. It was here that Bao first established his reputation as an astute judge. According to an anecdote, a man once reported that his ox's tongue had been sliced out. Bao told him to return and slaughter the ox for sale. Soon another man arrived in court and accused the first man of privately slaughtering a "beast of burden", an offense punishable by a year of penal servitude. Bao bellowed: "Why did you cut his ox's tongue and then accuse him?" In shock, the culprit had to confess.

== As prefect of Duanzhou ==
In 1040, Bao Zheng was promoted to the prefect of Duanzhou (modern Zhaoqing) in the south, a prefecture famous for its high-quality inkstones, a certain number of which were presented annually to the imperial court. However, Bao discovered that previous prefects had collected far more inkstones from manufacturers than the required tribute—several dozens of times more—in order to bribe influential ministers with the extras. Bao abolished the practice by telling manufacturers to fill only the required quota.

When his tenure was up in 1043, Bao left without a single inkstone in his possession. It was in Duanzhou that he wrote this poem:

Chinese

清心為治本
直道是身謀
秀幹終成棟
精剛不作鉤
倉充鼠雀喜
草盡兔狐愁
史冊有遺訓
勿貽來者羞

Pinyin

qīng xīn wèi zhì běn
zhí dào shì shēn móu
xiù gàn zhōng chéng dòng
jīng gāng bú zuò gōu
cāng chōng shǔ què xǐ
cǎo jǐn tù hú chóu
shǐ cè yǒu yí xùn
wú yí lái zhě xiū

English

The essence of governing is to have a cleansed heart,
The strategy of life is to follow upright ways.
An elegant stem will eventually turn into a pillar,
Refined steel cannot be bent into a hook.
Rats and sparrows overjoy when the granary is full,
Rabbits and foxes worry when the grassland dies.
History books contain teachings by those deceased:
Don't leave your descendants with only embarrassment!

== As investigating censor ==
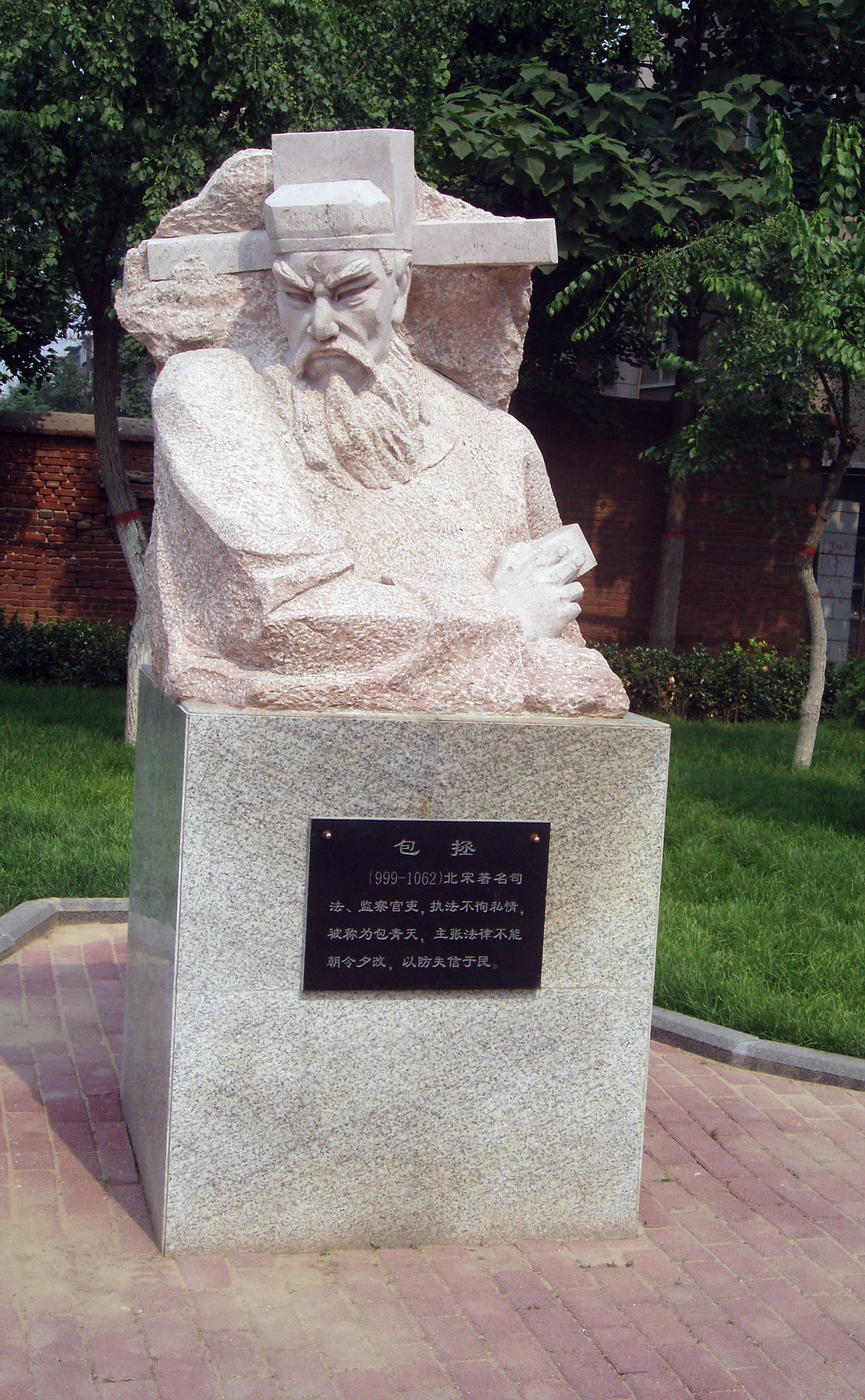
Bao Zheng's statue in Xiqing Park (西清公园), Shijiazhuang, Hebei, China.

Bao Zheng returned to the capital and was named an investigating censor in 1044. For the next two years in this position, Bao submitted at least 13 memoranda to Emperor Renzong of Song on military, taxation, the examination system, and governmental dishonesty and incompetence.

In 1045, Bao was sent to the Liao dynasty as a messenger. During an audience, a Liao official accused the Song of violating the peace by installing a secret side door in the border prefecture of Xiongzhou, so as to solicit defectors from Liao for intelligence. Bao retorted: "Why is a side door required for intelligence?" The Liao subject could not respond.

In the following years, Bao held the following positions:

- Fiscal commissioner of Hebei
- Vice Director of Ministry of Justice
- Auxiliary in the Academy of Scholarly Worthies (直集賢院)
- Vice Commissioner of Ministry of Revenue

== Impeaching Zhang Yaozuo ==
Emperor Renzong's favourite consort had been Concubine Zhang, whom he had wanted to make empress but could not because of opposition by his (unknown to him, fake) mother, Empress Dowager Liu. Nevertheless, the concubine's uncle Zhang Yaozuo (張堯佐) was quickly promoted within a few years from minor local posts to high office, including the state finance commissioner (三司使). On July 12, 1050, Bao and two other censors together presented a memorandum, which in strong language accused Zhang of mediocrity and shamelessness, even attributing natural disasters to his appointments. Probably annoyed, Emperor Renzong not only did nothing to Zhang Yaozuo, he awarded Consort Zhang's sister with a title four days later. But Bao did not give up. In another memorandum submitted by himself alone, he wrote:

In all dynasties, family members of imperial consorts, even when talented, were not appointed office, to say nothing of a mediocre, talentless one... In prostration, your subject saw our nation-dynasty since its founders had always carefully selected intelligent ministers for appointments, even at times of overflowing treasuries... The current (financial) state is dire and dangerous from all directions, how could this man be appointed to that post and hold on to it, dashing the world's hopes and neglecting the world's matters? Your subject really and painfully feels sorry for your majesty.

Partly to appease protests by Bao and others, the emperor relieved Zhang Yaozuo as state finance commissioner, but instead appointed him a concurrent four-commission position: commissioner of palace attendants, military commissioner of Huainan, Qunmu military commissioner-in-chief (群牧製置使), and commissioner of Jingling Palace (景靈宮). In a memorandum dated December 26, Bao voiced his strong protest and wrote:

The situation right now is, if your majesty is determined to appoint Yaozuo, then expel this advisor; if your majesty is to listen to this advisor, then (your majesty) must remove Yaozuo.

In the next court meeting to confirm Yaozuo's appointments, there was a heated argument in court led by seven ministers including Bao, which resulted in the emperor deciding to strip the commission of palace attendants and commission of Jingling palace from Zhang's promotion.

A few decades later, Zhu Bian (朱弁, 1085–1144) wrote a humorous account in his Anecdotes from Quwei (曲洧舊聞), which probably contributed to the development of future legends:

One day, when the emperor was about to hold audience, Wencheng (Concubine Zhang's posthumous name) sent him off all the way to the door of the palace court, caressed his back and said: "My husband, don't forget, commissioner of palace attendant today." The emperor said, "OK, OK." When he issued his edict, Bao Zheng asked to speak. Bao spoke at length on reasons to oppose, spoke hundreds of sentences repeatedly, his voice so loud and agitated that spittle spattered the emperor's face. The emperor, to stop him, gave up (on the edict). Wencheng, ... on receiving (the emperor), bowed and gave thanks. The emperor, wiping his face with his sleeve, said: "... All you know is ask for commissioner of palace attendant, commissioner of palace attendant. Don't you know that Bao Zheng is the vice censor-in-chief?"

During his years in the government service, Bao had thirty high officials demoted or dismissed for corruption, bribery, or dereliction of duty. In addition, as the imperial censor, Bao avoided punishment despite many other contemporary imperial censors having been punished for minor statements.

== As prefect of Kaifeng ==
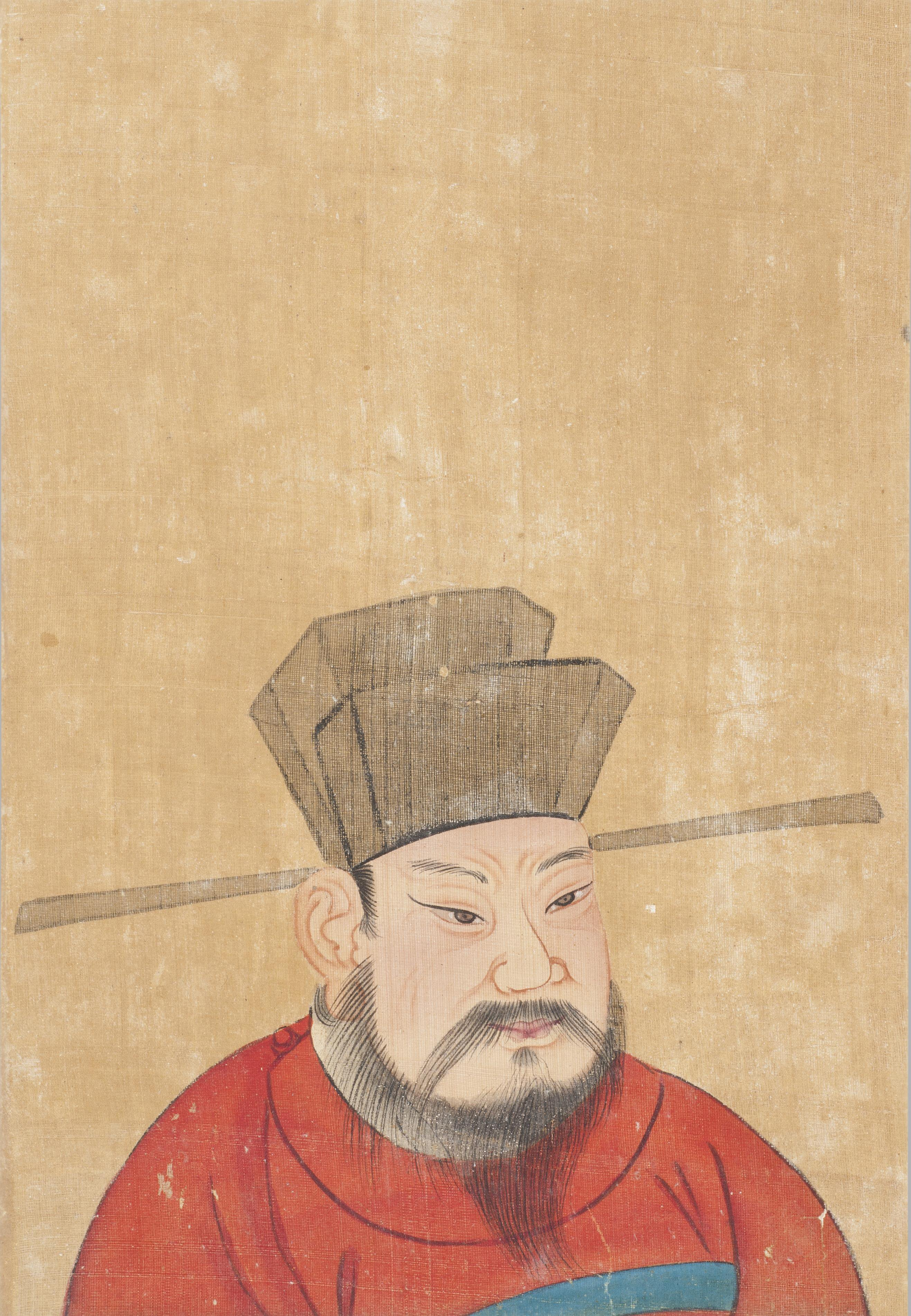
As depicted in the album Portraits of Famous Men c. 1900, housed in the Philadelphia Museum of Art

In 1057, Bao was appointed the magistrate of the capital city of Bian (present day Kaifeng). Bao held the position for only one year, but he initiated several material administrative reforms, including allowing the citizens to directly lodge complaints with the city administrators, thereby bypassing the city clerks who were believed to be corrupt and in the pay of local powerful families.

Bao had also been the Minister of Finance. Despite his high rank in the government, Bao led a modest life like a commoner.

Apart from his intolerance of injustice and corruption, Bao was well known for his filial piety and his stern demeanor. In his lifetime, Bao gained the name "Iron-Faced Judge" (鐵面判官) and it was also said among the public that his smile was "rarer than clear waters in the Yellow River".

Due to his fame and the strength of his reputation, Bao's name became synonymous with the idealized "honest and upright official" (清官), and quickly became a popular subject of early vernacular drama and literature. Bao was also associated with the god Yanluo (Yama) and the "Infernal Bureaucracy" of the Eastern Marchmount, on account of his supposed ability to judge affairs in the afterlife as well as he judged them in the realm of the living.

== Family ==
Bao Zheng had two wives, Lady Zhang (張氏) and Lady Dong (董氏). Bao had one son, Bao Yi, born 1033, and two daughters with Lady Dong. His only son Bao Yi died in 1053 at a relatively young age while being a government officer, two years after his marriage to Lady Cui (崔氏). Bao Yi's son, Bao Wenfu (包文辅), died prematurely at the age of five.

However, when a young maid Lady Sun (孙氏) in Bao Zheng's family became pregnant, Bao dismissed her back to her hometown. Lady Cui, Bao Yi's wife, knowing that the maid was pregnant with her father-in-law's child, continued to send money and clothing to her home. Upon the birth of Lady Sun's son named Bao Yan (包𫄧) (1057 - 1105), Lady Cui secretly brought him to her house to foster him. The following year, she brought him back to his biological father, thus enabling the continuation of Bao's family line. Bao Zheng and his wife rejoiced, and they renamed their new son as Bao Shou.

Bao Yi's wife Lady Cui was greatly praised in the official sources for her devotion to the protection of family line. This story was very influential to the formation of the legend that Bao Zheng was raised by his elder sister-in-law, whom he called "sister-in-law mother" (嫂娘).

== Death ==
Bao died in the Capital City of Kaifeng (present day Kaifeng, Henan) in 1062. It was recorded that he left the following warning for his family:

Any of my descendants who commits bribery as an official shall not be allowed back home nor buried in the family burial site. He who shares not my values is not my descendant.

Bao was buried in Daxingji in 1063. His tomb was rebuilt by officials of the Huaixi Road in 1066. Lady Dong died in 1068 and was buried next to him.

== Remains ==
=== Cultural Revolution period ===
During the Cultural Revolution, the Baogong Temple in Baohe Park of Hefei City was looted, and the Bao Zheng statue was ruined. The Bao Zheng portraits preserved by the generations of his descendants and the Baoshi Genealogy (包氏宗譜) were burned.

The relevant personnel set up a relic rescue effort "Bao Cemetery Clearing and Excavation Leading Group" (包公墓清理發掘領導小組) to excavate and clean up the cemetery. They unearthed Bao Zheng's remains and the two newly discovered tombstones with Chinese engravings in forms of (宋樞密副使贈禮部尚書孝肅包公墓銘) and (宋故永康郡夫人董氏墓誌銘). It was found that the tombstones of Bao Zheng and Lady Dong had been displaced due to destruction. In addition, the tomb of the eldest son and his wife, the tomb of the second son and his wife, and the tomb of the grandson Bao Yongnian (包永年) were also excavated and cleaned up. The excavation group handed back the remains of Bao Zheng and his family to their descendants.

One day in August 1973, the remains of Bao Zheng and his family were carried out in 11 wooden coffin boxes and transported back to Dabaocun (大包村), the hometown of Bao Zheng. However, the local commune secretary there would not allow their ancestors' remains to be buried on the grounds, otherwise they would be destroyed immediately.

Bao Zheng's descendants, in fear that the remains of Bao Zheng and his family would be destroyed, with the help of a fellow 34th generation descendant Bao Zunyuan (包遵元), secretly hid them elsewhere without knowing what to do. The remains, consisting of 34 Bao Zheng's bone fragments, would later be sent to Beijing for forensics research before they were returned to the newly reconstructed cemetery.

=== Reconstructed cemetery ===
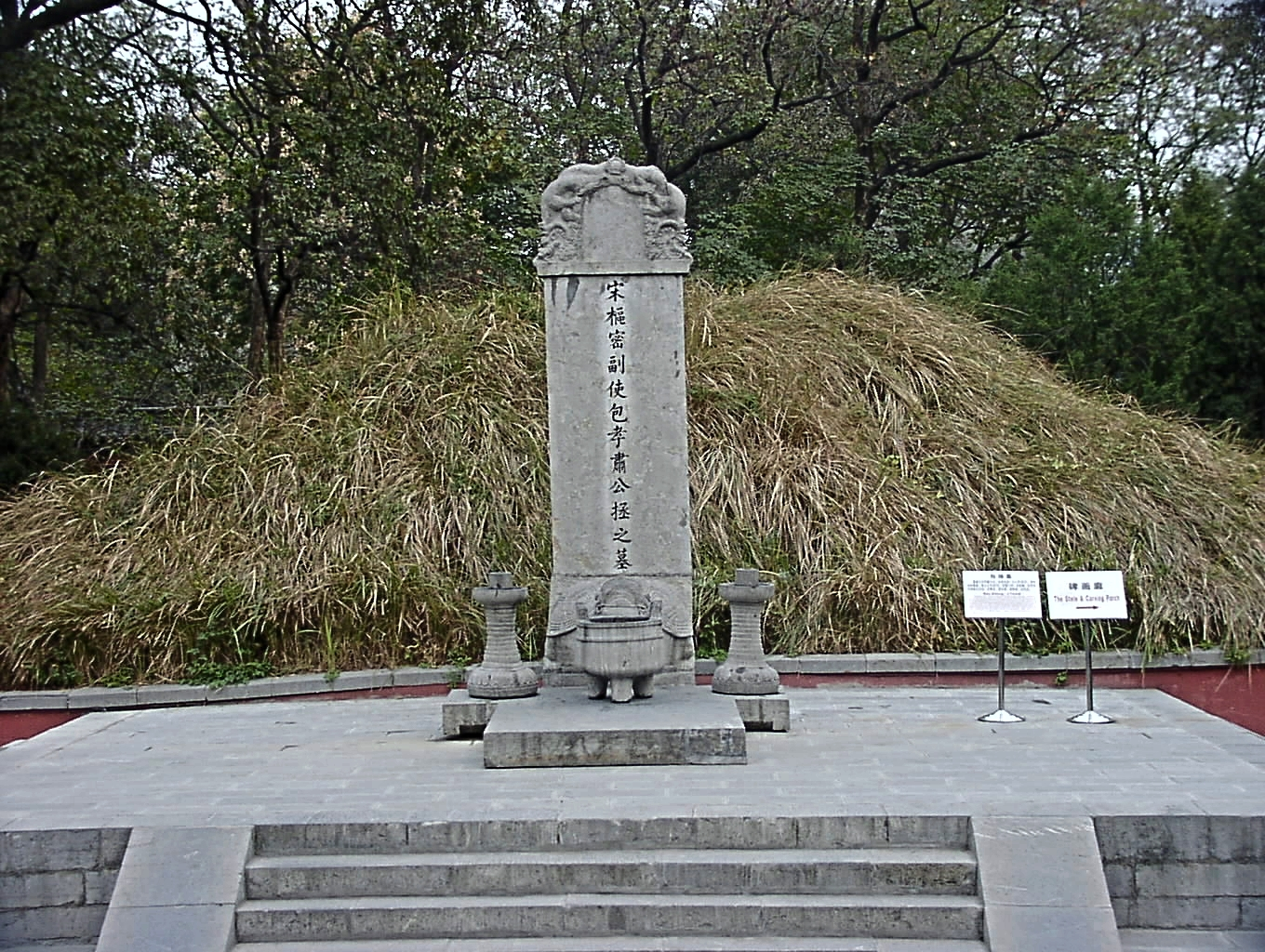
Bao Zheng's tomb in Luyang District, Hefei, Anhui, China.

The Bao Gong Cemetery (包公墓园) was reconstructed next to the Bao Gong Temple in Hefei in the forested area of Anhui in 1985 and was completed in 1987 to preserve the remains of Bao Zheng and artifacts from the former tombs. The exact location of Bao Zheng and his family's remains however is unknown, known only to his descendants.

== Notable descendants ==
- 8th generation: Bao Xun
- 9th generation: Bao Hui
- 27th generation: Bao Fang Wu (包方务)
- 28th generation: Pao Siu Loong
- 29th generation: Yue-Kong Pao, Yue-Shu Pao, Pao Teh-ming
- 30th generation: Anna Pao Sohmen, Bessie Pao Woo, Cissy Pao-Watari, Doreen Pao
- 32nd generation: Bao Zhenming
- 33rd generation: Bao Huacheng (包华成), Bao Huazhang (包华章), Bao Huabing (包华兵), Bao Huajun (包华军), Bao Huaxiu (包华秀), Bao Shengdong (包胜东), Run Bao, Anthony Bao, Tino Bao
- 34th generation: Bao Tingzheng, Bao Xi (包玺), Bao Dan (包丹), Bao Huifang (包慧芳), Bao Yong (包勇), Bao Zunyuan (包遵元), Bao Zunxin

== Legends ==
=== Literary traditions ===
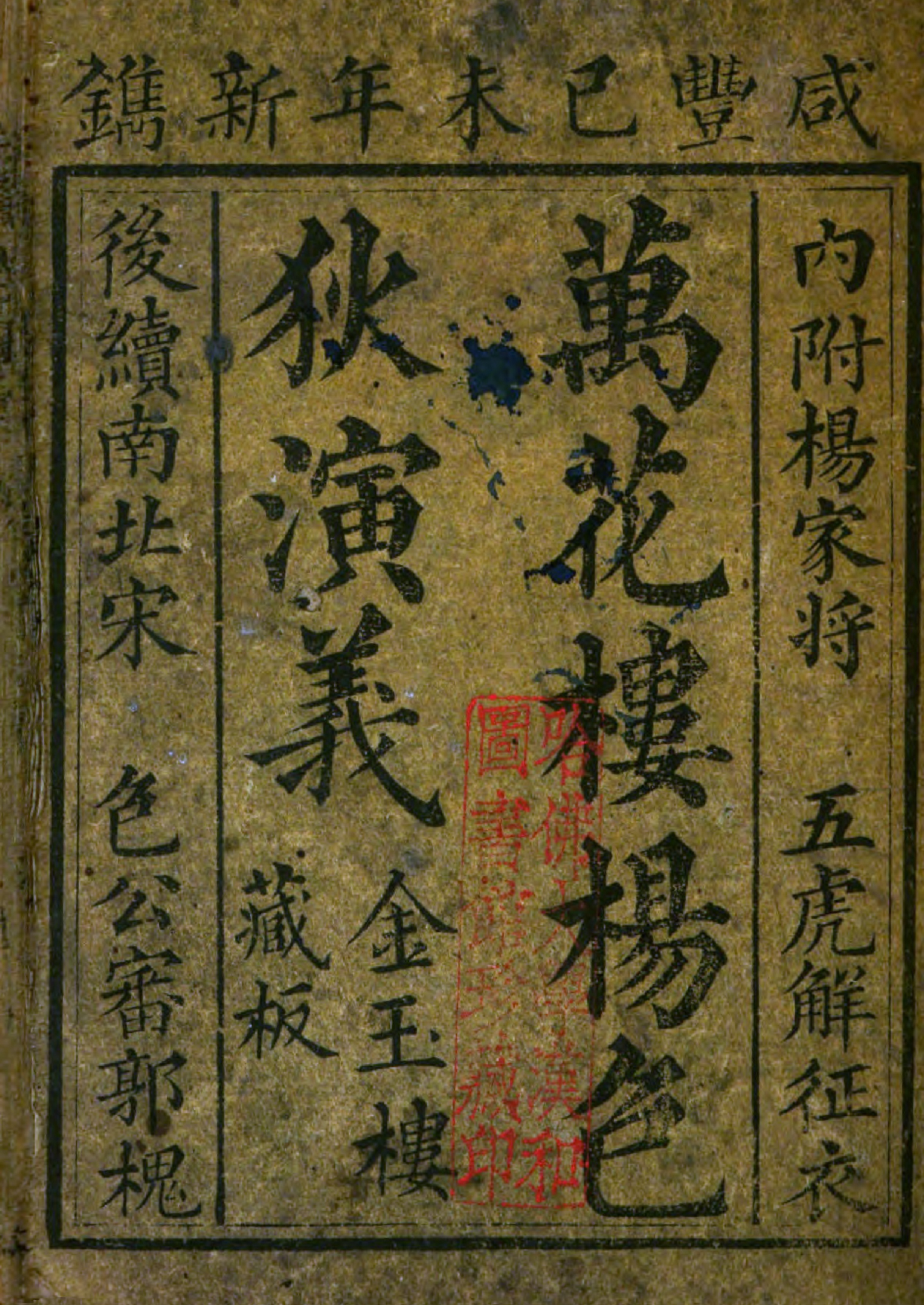
Pavilion of Ten Thousand Flowers, as printed in 1859 by the Hall of Gold and Jade (金玉樓), featuring Bao Zheng as main character

Bao Zheng's stories were retold and preserved particularly in the form of performance arts such as Chinese opera and pingshu. Written forms of his legend appeared in the Yuan Dynasty in the form of Qu. Vernacular fiction of Judge Bao was popular in the Ming and Qing Dynasties. A common protagonist of gong'an fiction, Judge Bao stories revolve around Bao, a magistrate, investigating and solving criminal cases. When Sherlock Holmes was first translated into Chinese in the Qing Dynasty, the Chinese called Sherlock “the English Judge Bao.”

In the Yuan Dynasty, many plays (in the forms of qu and zaju) have featured Bao Zheng as the central character. These plays include:

- Rescriptor Bao Cleverly Investigates the Circle of Chalk (包待制智勘灰闌記) by Li Qianfu
- Rescriptor Bao Thrice Investigates the Butterfly Dream (包待制三勘蝴蝶夢) by Guan Hanqing, English translation can be found in Yang & Yang 1958
- Rescriptor Bao Cleverly Executes Court Official Lu (包待制智斬魯齋郎) by Guan Hanqing, English translation can be found in Yang & Yang 1958 (as The Wife-Snatcher)
- Rescriptor Bao Sells Rice at Chenzhou (包待制陳州糶米), English translation can be found in Hayden 1978
- Ding-ding Dong-dong: The Ghost of the Pot (玎玎當當盆兒鬼), English translation can be found in Hayden 1978
- Rescriptor Bao Cleverly Investigates the Flower of the Back Courtyard (包待制智勘後庭花) by Zheng Tingyu, English translation can be found in Hayden 1978

Also discovered from this period include some ballads which had been translated by Wilt L. Idema in 2010.

The 16th-century novel Bao Gong An by An Yushi (安遇時) (partially translated by Leon Comber in 1964) increased his popularity and added a detective element to his legends.

The 19th-century novel The Seven Heroes and Five Gallants by the storyteller Shi Yukun (石玉昆) (partially translated by Song Shouquan in 1997 as well as Susan Blader in 1997) added a wuxia twist to his stories.

In Pavilion of Ten Thousand Flowers (萬花樓), Five Tigers Conquer the West (五虎平西), Five Tigers Conquer the South (五虎平南) and Five Tigers Conquer the North (五虎平北), four serial wuxia novels composed by Li Yutang (李雨堂) during Qing Dynasty, Bao Zheng, Di Qing and Yang Zongbao appear as main characters.

In What the Master Would Not Discuss (子不語), a Qing Dynasty biji by Yuan Mei (袁枚), Bao Zheng as well as the belief that he was able to judge affairs of both human beings and supernatural beings is featured.

=== Stories ===
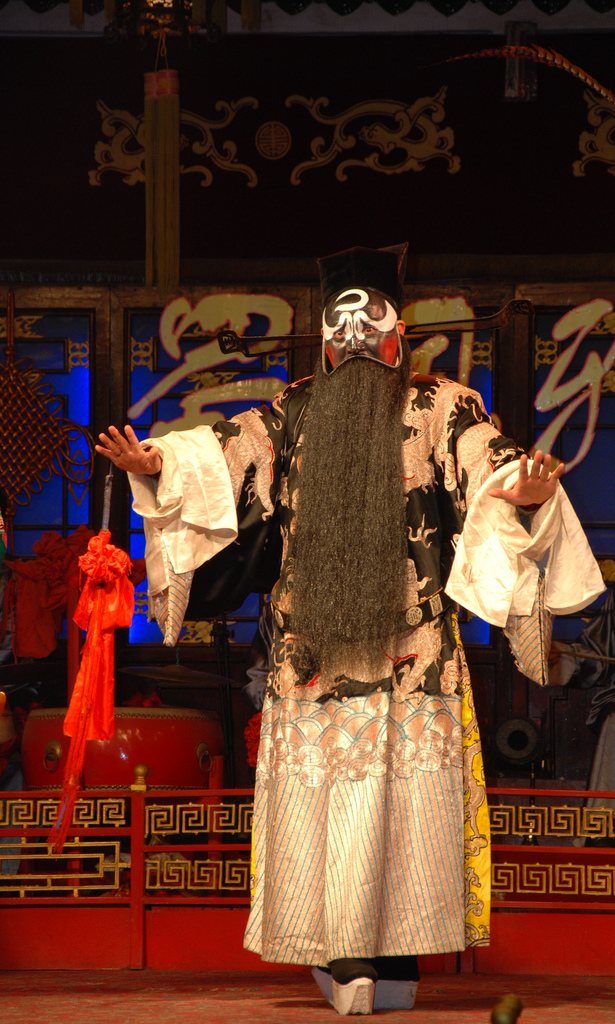
Bao Zheng portrayed by a Peking Opera actor.

In opera or drama, he is often portrayed with a black face and a white crescent shaped birthmark on his forehead.

In legends, because he was born dark-skinned and extremely ugly, Bao Zheng was considered cursed and thrown away by his father right after birth. However, his virtuous elder sister-in-law, who just had an infant named Bao Mian (包勉), picked Bao Zheng up and raised him like her own son. As a result, Bao Zheng would refer to Bao Mian's mother as "sister-in-law mother".

In most dramatizations of his stories, he used a set of guillotines (鍘刀, "lever-knife"), given to him by the emperor, to execute criminals:

- The one decorated with a dog's head (狗頭鍘 or 犬頭鍘) was used on commoners.
- The one decorated with a tiger's head (虎頭鍘) was used on government officials.
- The one decorated with a dragon's head (龍頭鍘 or 火龍鍘) was used on royal personages.

He was granted a golden rod (金黄夏楚) by the previous emperor, with which he was authorized to chastise the current emperor. He was also granted an imperial sword (尚方寶劍) from the previous emperor; whenever it was exhibited to the persons surrounding, irrespective of their social classes, they must pay respect and compliance to the person exhibiting the sword as if they were the emperor (unless the person has an object of equal power). Each of Bao Zheng's guillotines were authorized to execute the corresponding social-ranked person without first obtaining approval from the emperor, though any interference from the emperor would stop the process.

He is famous for his uncompromising stance against corruption among the government officials at the time. He upheld justice and refused to yield to higher powers including the Emperor's Father-in-Law (國丈), who was also appointed as the Grand Tutor (太師) and was known as Grand Tutor Pang (龐太師). He is depicted to have treated Bao as an enemy. Although Grand Tutor Pang is often depicted in myth as an archetypical villain (arrogant, selfish, and cruel), the historical reasons for his bitter rivalry with Bao remain unclear.

Bao Zheng also managed to remain in favour by cultivating a long-standing friendship with one of Emperor Renzong's uncles, the Eighth Imperial Prince (八王爺) and Prime Minister Wang Yanling (王延齡).

In many stories Bao is usually accompanied by his skilled bodyguard Zhan Zhao (展昭) and personal secretary Gongsun Ce (公孙策). Zhan is a skilled martial artist while Gongsun is an intelligent adviser. When Sherlock Holmes was first translated into Chinese - Watson was compared to Gongsun Ce. There are also four enforcers named Wang Chao (王朝), Ma Han (馬漢), Zhang Long (張龍), and Zhao Hu (趙虎). All of these characters are presented as righteous and incorruptible.

Due to his strong sense of justice, he is very popular in China, especially among the peasants and the poor. He became the subject of literature and modern Chinese TV series in which his adventures and cases are featured.

=== Famous cases ===
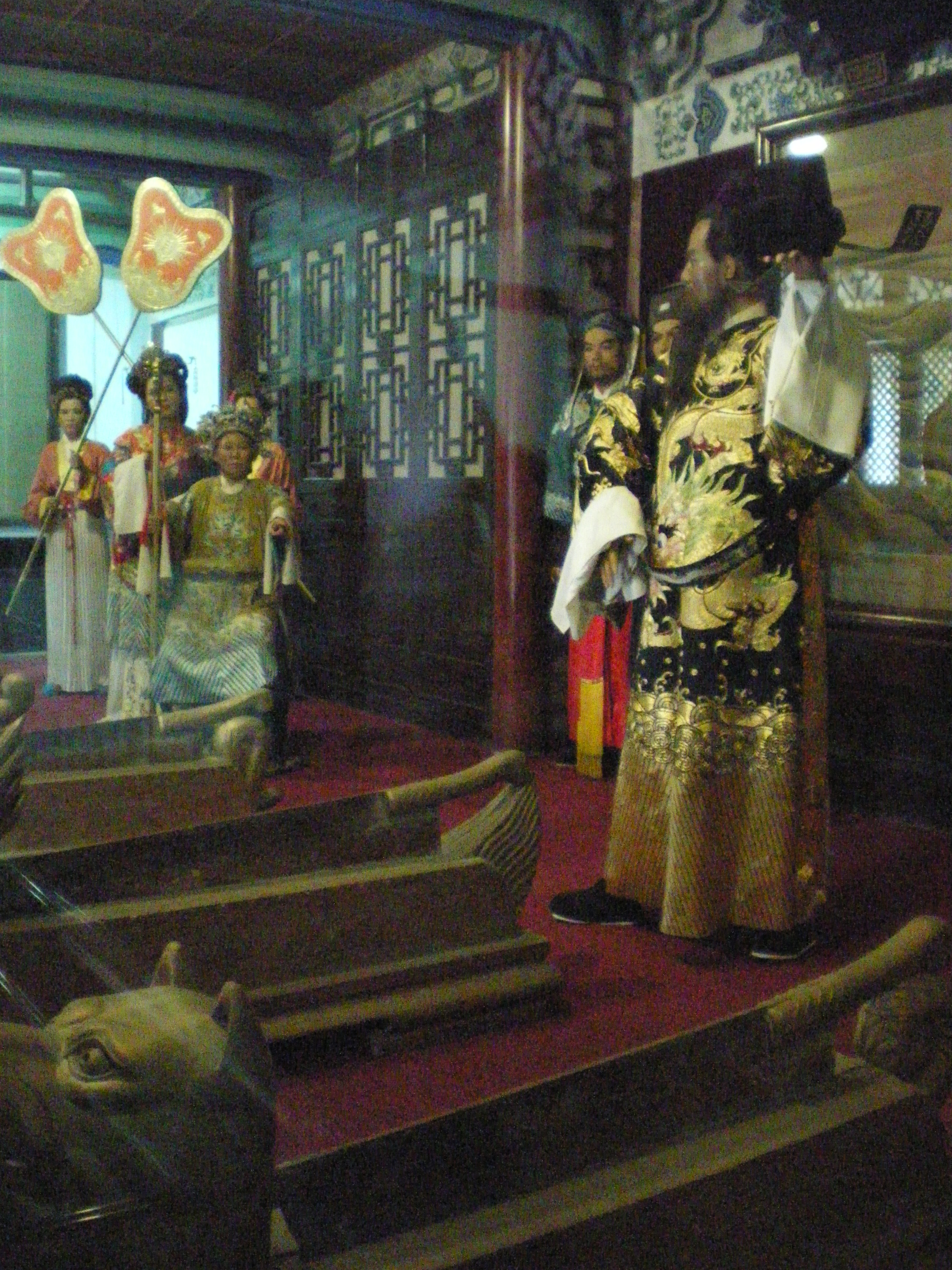
Wax sculptures inside the Lord Bao Memorial Temple, a tourist attraction in Kaifeng, Henan, China. In this scene, a fearless Bao Zheng takes off his official headwear to challenge the empress dowager, in order to execute the prince consort Chen Shimei.

All of these cases have been favorites in Chinese opera.

- Executing Chen Shimei (鍘美案): Chen Shimei had two children with wife Qin Xianglian, when he left them behind in his hometown for the Imperial examination in the capital. After placing first, he lied about his marriage and became the emperor's new brother-in-law. Years later, a famine forced Qin and her children to move to the capital, where they learned what happened to Chen. Qin finally found a way to meet Chen and begged him to help at least his own children. Not only did Chen refuse, he sent his servant Han Qi to kill them in order to hide his secret, but Han helped the family escape and killed himself. Desperate, Qin brought her case to Bao Zheng, who tricked Chen to the court to have him arrested. The imperial family intervened with threats, but Bao executed him nonetheless.
- Executing Bao Mian (鍘包勉): When Bao Zheng was an infant, he was raised by his elder sister-in-law, Wu, like a son. Years later, Wu's only son Bao Mian became a magistrate, and was convicted of bribery and malfeasance. Finding it impossible to fulfill both Confucian concepts of loyalty and filial piety, an emotional Bao Zheng was about to reluctantly execute his nephew. In the end, the real criminals were forced to confess and Bao Mian's sentence was commuted.
- Civet Cat Exchanged for Crown Prince (狸貓換太子): Bao Zheng met a woman claiming to be the mother of the reigning Emperor Renzong. Dozens of years prior, she had been Consort Li, an imperial concubine of Emperor Zhenzong's, before falling out of favour for supposedly giving birth to a bloody (and dead) civet cat. In reality, the jealous Consort Liu had plotted with eunuch Guo Huai (郭槐) to secretly swap Li's infant with a skinned civet cat minutes after the birth and ordered palace maid Kou Zhu to kill the baby. However, Kou gave the baby to chief eunuch Chen Lin (陳琳), who secretly brought the child to the Eighth Prince, a younger brother of Emperor Zhenzong. Kou was later tortured to death by Guo when Consort Liu began to suspect that the infant had survived. The child was raised by the Eighth Prince as his own son and was subsequently selected to succeed Emperor Zhenzong, who had died heirless. Due to the passage of time, gathering evidence was a challenge. With the help of a woman dressed as Kou's ghost, Bao dressed himself as Yama, lord of Hell, to play on both Guo's fear of the supernatural and guilt, thereby extracting his confession. When the verdict was out, the emperor was reluctant to accept Consort Li. Bao then admonished the emperor and ordered that he be beaten for lack of filial piety. The emperor's Dragon Robe was beaten instead. Emperor Renzong eventually accepted his mother and elevated her as the new empress dowager.
- The Case of Two Nails (雙釘記): Bao Zheng investigated a man's suspicious death whose cause had been ruled as natural. After an autopsy, his coroner confirmed the earlier report that there was no injury to the whole body. At home, the coroner discussed the case with his wife, who mentioned that someone could force long steel nails into the brain without injuring the body. The next day, the coroner indeed found a long nail, and the dead man's widow was arrested; she confessed to adultery and mariticide. Afterwards, Bao Zheng began to question the coroner's wife and learned that the coroner is her second husband, as her first husband had died. Bao ordered his guards to go to the cemetery and unearth her first husband's coffin. Sure enough, there was also a nail driven into the skull.
- The Case of the Black Basin (烏盆記): A silk merchant by the name of Liu Shichang was on a trip home when he decided to ask for food and overnight lodging at the place of Zhao Da, the owner of a pottery kiln. Greedy for the riches carried by Liu, Zhao killed him by poisoning his dinner, burying his remains with clay in his kiln to make a black basin in order to destroy the evidence. An old man named Zhang Biegu, whom Zhao owed a debt to, soon took the basin from Zhao in lieu of cash payment. Zhang eventually encountered the Liu's ghost, who had been possessing the basin ever since his murder, and was told the story of the latter's cruel death at Zhao's hands. Determined to bring the suspect to justice, Zhang soon brought the black basin to Bao Zheng's court in Kaifeng and after several attempts, finally persuaded Liu's ghost to tell the judge everything. As a result, Zhao was finally arrested and executed for murder.

== Modern references ==
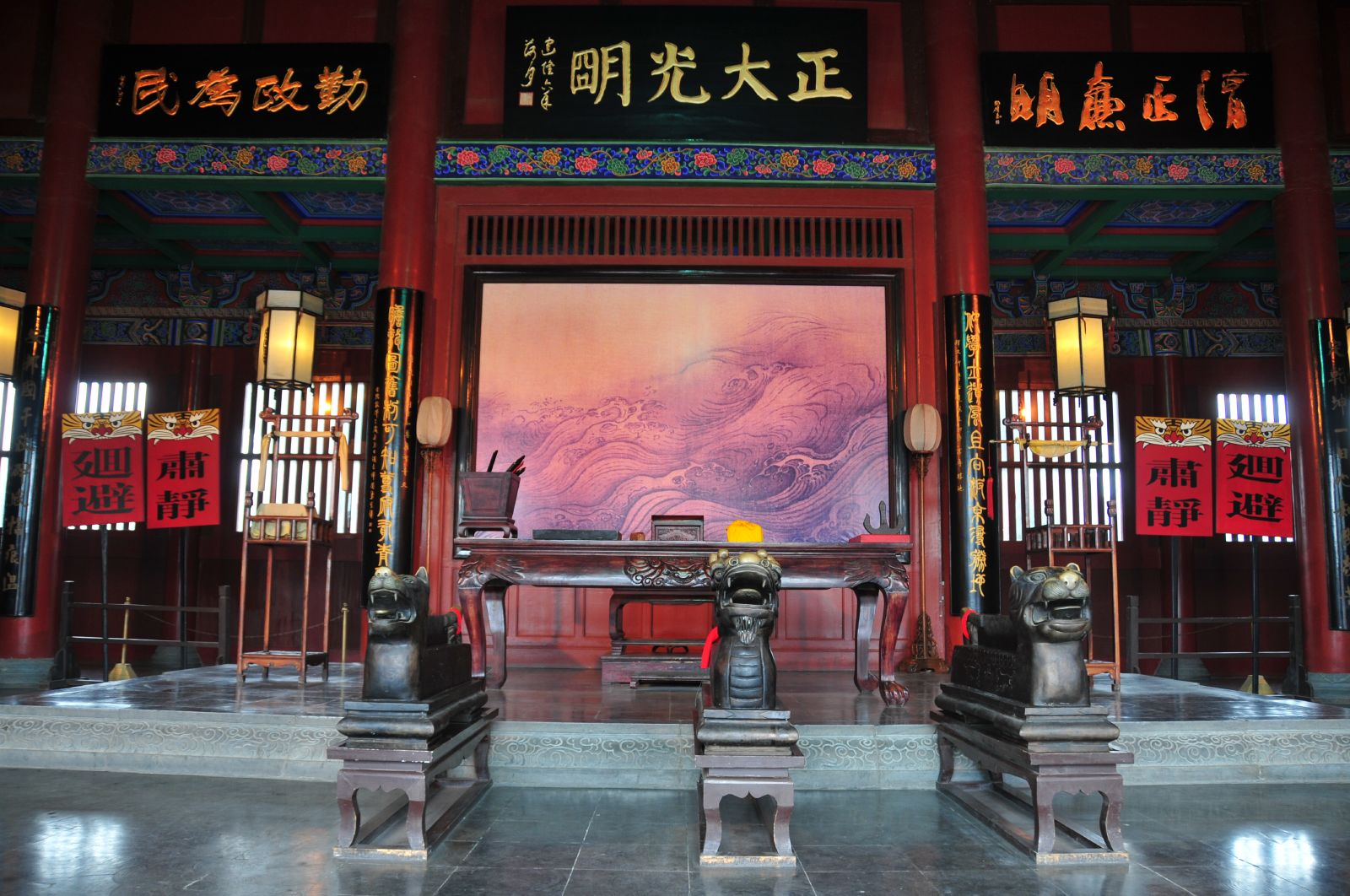
The Kaifeng Court, a tourist attraction in Kaifeng, Henan, China, displaying the three guillotines Bao Zheng had allegedly used.

A large painted face of Bao Zheng in Haw Par Villa, Singapore.

=== Linguistic influence ===
In modern Chinese, "Bao Gong" or "Bao Qingtian" is invoked as a metaphor or symbol of justice. There is a chain of cafes selling baozi in Singapore called Bao Today (Bao Jin Tian), which is a pun on Bao Qingtian (Justice Bao).

In the Thai language, Than Pao (ท่านเปา; "Lord Bao") has become a colloquial term for a judge. The Royal Institute of Thailand recorded the term in the Dictionary of New Words, Volume 2, published in 2009. Furthermore, the word "Pao" is used colloquially by the sports media to mean a referee in a game, especially a football match.

=== Films ===
- Redressing a Grievance (乌盆记), a 1927 Chinese silent film featuring Ling Wusi as Bao Zheng.
- The Crimson Palm (血手印), a 1964 Shaw Brothers musical film features Cheng Miu as Bao Zheng, and is about a scholar who is framed for murder by his fiancée's father.
- Inside the Forbidden City (宋宮秘史), a 1965 Shaw Brothers musical film stars Cheng Miu as Bao Zheng, and tells the story of the "Wild Cat for Crown Prince conspiracy" case.
- The Mermaid (魚美人), a 1965 Shaw Brothers musical film features Cheng Miu as Bao Zheng, and is a fantasy about a carp spirit who is in love with a human scholar.
- King Cat (七俠五義), a 1967 Shaw Brothers film features Cheng Miu as Bao Zheng.
- The Wrongly Killed Girl (南俠展昭大破地獄門), a 1976 Hong Kong film stars Jen Hao as Bao Zheng and tells the Liu Jinchan murder.
- Cat and Mouse (老鼠愛上貓), a 2003 Media Asia romantic comedy stars Anthony Wong as Bao Zheng.
- Game of a Cat and Mouse (包青天之五鼠鬥御貓), a 2005 film stars Jin Chao-chun as Bao Zheng.
- Hua Gu Di Wang (包青天之化骨帝王), a Mainland China film planned for 2013 release.

Stephen Chow also made a spin-off movie based on Bao Zheng called Hail the Judge and titled Pale Face Bao Zheng Ting in Chinese. In the movie Chow plays a descendant of Bao Zheng called "Bao Sing" living during Qing Dynasty, whose family lost its once glorious prestige due to generations of incompetence and corruption.

=== Television ===
Some of the more prominent TV series include:

- Justice Bao (包青天), a 1974–75 series produced by CTSTV totaling 350 episodes With English subtitles. Yi Ming portrayed Bao Zheng.
- Justice Bao (包青天), a 1993–94 series produced by CTSTV with 41 cases totaling 236 episodes produced in one season. This would be the first series where Jin Chao-chun portrayed Bao Zheng.
- Young Justice Bao (侠义包公), a 1994 series produced by SBC (now Mediacorp) and starring Chew Chor Meng as young Bao Zheng.
- Justice Bao (包青天), a 1995 series produced by TVB and starring Ti Lung as Bao Zheng, with 16 cases totaling 80 episodes.
- Justice Bao (新包青天), a 1995–1996 series produced by ATV and starring Jin Chao-chun as Bao Zheng, with 25 cases totaling 160 episodes.
- Young Justice Bao (少年包青天), a 2000 Mainland Chinese series starring Zhou Jie as Young Bao Zheng, with 40 episodes divided into seven cases. This series is heavily inspired by mainstream crime fiction such as Sherlock Holmes and Detective Conan
- Justice Bao (包青天), a 2008 Mainland Chinese series starring Jin Chao-chun as Bao Zheng, with five cases totaling 61 episodes.
- Justice Bao (包青天), a 2010 Mainland Chinese series starring Jin Chao-chun as Bao Zheng. The first season airing in 2010, three seasons totaling 120 episodes have been shown as of 2012.
- Justice Bao: The First Year (包青天再起風雲), a 2019 series produced by TVB and starring Shaun Tam as young Bao Zheng, totaling 30 episodes. His father Ti Lung played the titular role 24 years earlier.

=== Novels ===
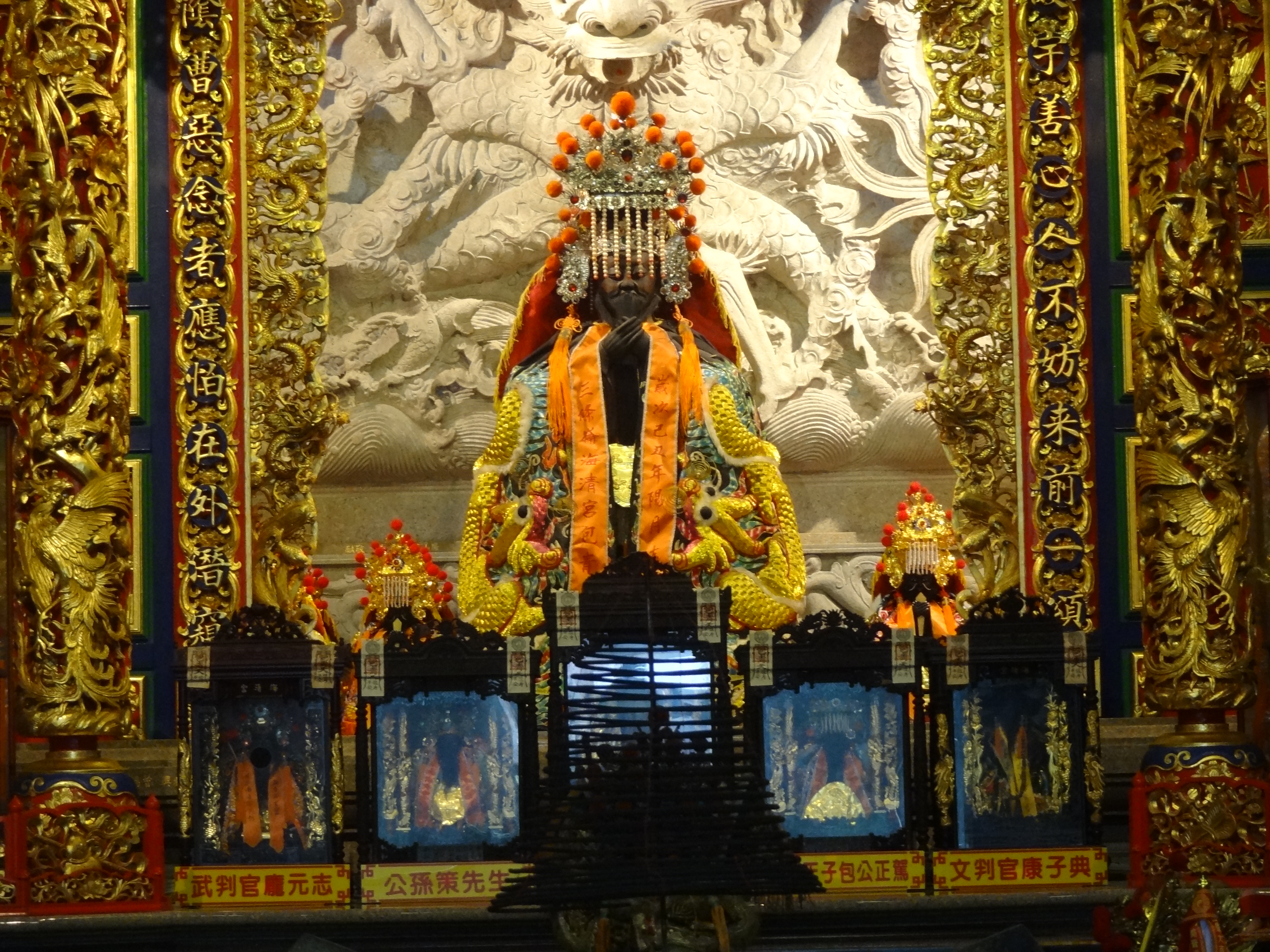
Bao Zheng's shrine in Haiching Temple (海清宫) in Sihu, Yunlin County, Taiwan.

Bao Zheng briefly appears in the novel Iron Arm, Golden Sabre and sponsors young Zhou Tong's entry into the military as an officer.

In March 2012, Frederic Lenormand, author of 18 Judge Dee's New Cases (Fayard 2004–2011), published at Editions Philippe Picquier Un Thé chez Confucius (A Tea with Confucius), first novel of his new series, The Judge Bao Cases.

=== Video games ===
An unlicensed Nintendo side-scrolling/platform game for Famicom, entitled Bāo Qīngtián (Chinese: 包青天), also known as Justice Pao, was made in Taiwan by ex-Sachen developers and published by Ka Sheng in 1996.

=== Comics and manga ===
In the Marvel comic series New Universal, Young Judge Bao is one of the characters in an in-universe comic book.

"Les éditions Fei" also publishes a series of French-language comics about Bao Zheng. As of August 2010, two volumes have been printed.

A 16-volume Japanese manga series Hokusō Fūunden (北宋風雲伝), partly adapting the 1993 TV series, was serialized in the magazine Princess GOLD, published by Akita Shoten, from May 2000 to May 2008.

== See also ==
- Bao Gong An
- Chinese crime fiction
- Generals of the Yang Family
- The Seven Heroes and Five Gallants
- Zhan Zhao
