= Judge Bao fiction =

Traditional Chinese crime fiction

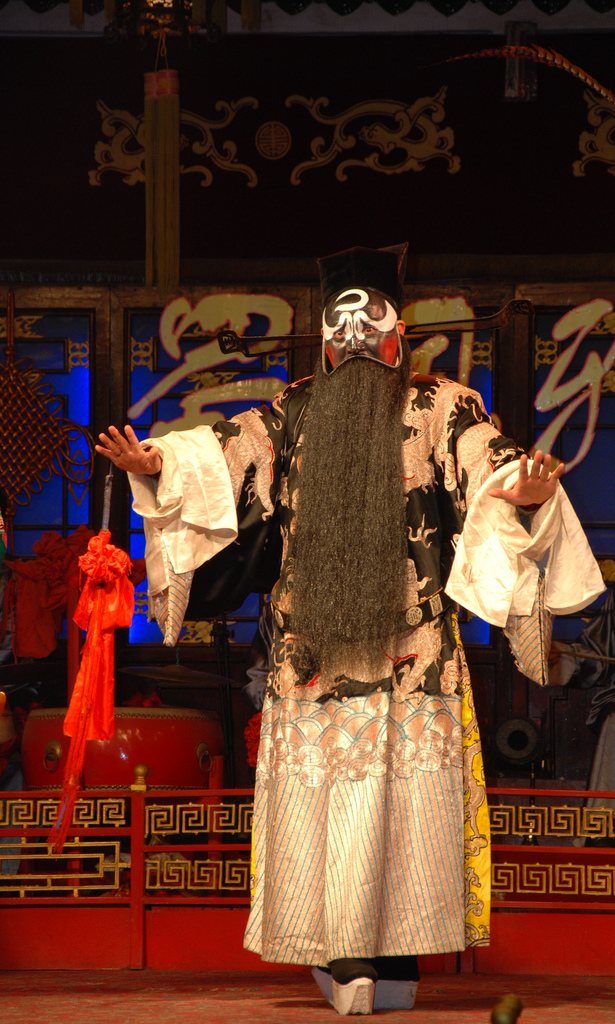
The character Judge Bao in a 2009 Sichuan opera performance in Chengdu, Sichuan, China.

Judge Bao or Justice Bao (Chinese: 包青天; pinyin: Bāo qīngtiān) stories in literature and performing arts are some of the most popular in traditional Chinese crime fiction (gong'an fiction). These stories are based on the Song dynasty minister Bao Zheng who solves, judges and sentences criminal cases. Since the accused were sometimes men of power, Bao had to display courage and ingenuity in bringing them to justice. These stories helped to make Bao a symbol of a fearless official.

== Literary tradition ==
=== Plays from the Yuan and Ming dynasties ===
In the Yuan Dynasty, many plays (in the forms of qu and zaju) have featured Bao Zheng as the central character. These plays include:

- Judge Bao Cleverly Investigates the Circle of Chalk (包待制智勘灰闌記) by Li Qianfu
- Judge Bao Thrice Investigates the Butterfly Dream (包待制三勘蝴蝶夢) by Guan Hanqing
- Judge Bao Cleverly Executes Court Official Lu (包待制智斬魯齋郎) by Guan Hanqing
- Judge Bao Sells Rice at Chenzhou (包待制陳州糶米)
- Ding-ding Dong-dong: The Ghost of the Pot (玎玎璫璫盆兒鬼)
- Judge Bao Cleverly Investigates the Flower of the Back Courtyard (包待制智勘後庭花) by Zheng Tingyu

=== Story Collections from the Ming dynasty ===
In 1594, the Yupan tang (與畔堂) bookstore owner An Yushi (安遇時) published the first Judge Bao-themed short story collection Cases of A Hundred Families Judged by Dragon-Design Bao (包龍圖判百家公案).

- Cases Judged by the Dragon-Design (龍圖公案) by anonymous, which includes several chapters from the previous book.
- "Lady Qin's Ghost Return to Exile Shimei" (秦氏還魂配世美), Ch.26, which tells the story of a heartless man Chen Shimei betraying his loyal wife Lady Qin for power and wealth.

A Peking opera performance featuring Bao Zheng (seated) and his officers to his back.

Judge Bao stories in other collections include:

- "Song the Fourth Greatly Torments Tightwad Zhang" (宋四公大鬧禁魂張) in Feng Menglong's Stories Old and New (1620)
- "Judge Bao Solves a Case through a Ghost That Appeared Thrice" (三現身包龍圖斷冤) in Feng's Stories to Caution the World (1624)
- "Squire Zhang Righteously Raises the Orphan; Judge Bao Cleverly Extracts the Contract" (張員外義撫螟蛉子 包龍圖智賺合同文) in Ling Mengchu's Slapping the Table in Amazement (1628)

=== Chantefables from the Ming dynasty ===
In 2010, the scholar Wilt Idema published an annotated translation of eight ballad-stories (chantefable) from a late Ming dynasty collection printed in Beijing in the late Ming and which had recently been found in a tomb.

=== Famous cases ===
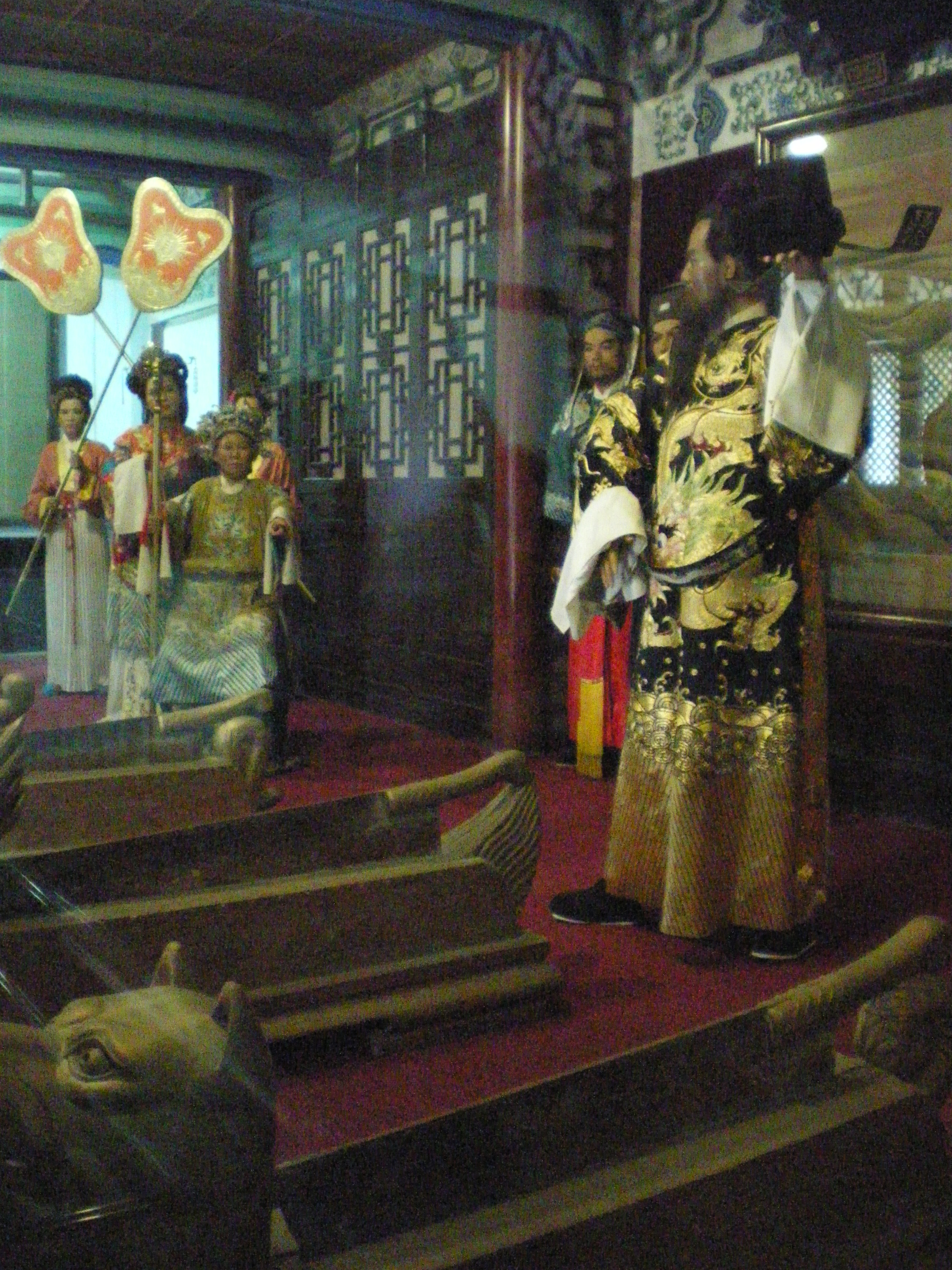
Sculptures inside the Lord Bao Memorial Temple, a tourist attraction in Kaifeng, Henan, China. In this scene, a fearless Bao Zheng takes off his official headwear to challenge the empress dowager, in order to execute the prince consort Chen Shimei.

All of these cases have been favorites in Chinese opera.

- Civet Cat Exchanged for Crown Prince (狸貓換太子): Bao Zheng met a woman claiming to be the mother of the reigning Emperor Renzong. Dozens of years prior, she had been Consort Li, an imperial concubine of Emperor Zhenzong's, before falling out of favour for supposedly giving birth to a bloody (and dead) civet cat. In reality, the jealous Consort Liu had plotted with eunuch Guo Huai (郭槐) to secretly swap Li's infant with a skinned civet cat minutes after the birth and ordered palace maid Kou Zhu to kill the baby. However, Kou gave the baby to chief eunuch Chen Lin (陳琳), who secretly brought the child to the Eighth Prince, a younger brother of Emperor Zhenzong. Kou was later tortured to death by Guo when Consort Liu began to suspect that the infant had survived. The child was raised by the Eighth Prince as his own son and was subsequently selected to succeed Emperor Zhenzong, who had died heirless. Due to the passage of time, gathering evidence was a challenge. With the help of a woman dressed as Kou's ghost, Bao dressed himself as Yama, lord of Hell, to play on both Guo's fear of the supernatural and guilt, thereby extracting his confession. When the verdict was out, the emperor was reluctant to accept Consort Li. Bao then admonished the emperor and ordered that he be beaten for lack of filial piety. The emperor's Dragon Robe was beaten instead. Emperor Renzong eventually accepted his mother and elevated her as the new empress dowager.
- The Case of Executing Chen Shimei (鍘美案): Chen Shimei had two children with wife Qin Xianglian, when he left them behind in his hometown for the Imperial examination in the capital. After placing first, he lied about his marriage and became the emperor's new son-in-law. Years later, a famine forced Qin and her children to move to the capital, where they learned what happened to Chen. Qin finally found a way to meet Chen and begged him to help at least his own children. Not only did Chen refuse, he sent his servant Han Qi to kill them to hide his secret, but Han helped the family escape and killed himself. Desperate, Qin brought her case to Bao Zheng, who tricked Chen to the court to have him arrested. The imperial family intervened with threats, but Bao executed him nonetheless.
- Executing Bao Mian (鍘包勉): When Bao Zheng was an infant, he was raised by his elder sister-in-law, Wu, like a son. Years later, Wu's only son Bao Mian became a magistrate, and was convicted of bribery and malfeasance. Finding it impossible to fulfill both Confucian concepts of loyalty and filial piety, an emotional Bao Zheng executed his nephew according to the law and later tearfully apologized to Wu, his motherly figure.
- The Case of Two Nails (雙釘記): Bao Zheng investigated a husband's suspicious death whose cause had been ruled natural. After an autopsy, his coroner confirmed the earlier report that there was no injury throughout the body. At home, the coroner discussed the case with his wife, who mentioned that someone could force long steel nails into the brain, leaving no other traces on the body. The next day, the coroner found a long nail indeed, and the widow was arrested and confessed to adultery and mariticide. Afterwards, Bao Zheng began to question the coroner's wife and learned that the coroner is her second husband, as her first husband had died. Bao ordered his guards to go to the cemetery and unearth her first husband's coffin. Sure enough, there was also a nail in the skull.
- The Case of the Black Basin (烏盆記): A silk merchant by the name of Liu Shichang was on a trip home when he decided to ask for food and overnight lodging at the place of Zhao Da, the owner of a pottery kiln. Greedy over the riches carried by Liu, Zhao killed him by poisoning his dinner, and burned Liu's remains with clay in his kiln to make a black basin, in order to destroy the evidence. An old man named Zhang Biegu, whom Zhao owed a debt to, soon took the basin from Zhao as an alternate of cash payment. Zhang eventually encountered the ghost of Liu, who had been possessing the basin ever since his demise, and was told the story of the latter's cruel death at Zhao's hands. Determined to put the suspect to justice, Zhang soon brought the black basin to Bao Zheng's court in Kaifeng and after several attempts, finally persuaded Liu's ghost to tell the judge everything. As a result, Zhao was finally arrested and executed for murder.
