= Chen Shimei and Qin Xianglian =

Chinese opera characters

Chen Shimei

In-universe information
- Gender: Male
- Title: Prince consort
- Spouse: Qin Xianglian
- Children: Winter Boy (冬哥); Spring Maid (春妹)
- Nationality: Song dynasty
- Hometown: Jun Prefecture

Qin Xianglian

In-universe information
- Gender: Female
- Spouse: Chen Shimei
- Children: Winter Boy (冬哥); Spring Maid (春妹)
- Nationality: Song dynasty
- Hometown: Jun Prefecture

Chen Shimei

Chinese name
- Traditional Chinese: 陳世美
- Simplified Chinese: 陈世美
Transcriptions
Standard Mandarin
- Hanyu Pinyin: Chén Shìměi
- Wade–Giles: Ch'en^{2} Shih^{4}-mei^{3}

Vietnamese name
- Vietnamese: Trần Thế Mỹ
- Chữ Hán: 陳世美

Qin Xianglian

Chinese name
- Traditional Chinese: 秦香蓮
- Simplified Chinese: 秦香莲
Transcriptions
Standard Mandarin
- Hanyu Pinyin: Qín Xiānglián
- Wade–Giles: Ch'in^{2} Hsiang^{1}-lien^{2}

Vietnamese name
- Vietnamese: Tần Hương Liên
- Chữ Hán: 秦香蓮

Chen Shimei is a Chinese opera character and a byword in China for a heartless and unfaithful man. He was married to Qin Xianglian, also translated as Fragrant Lotus. Chen Shimei betrayed Qin Xianglian by marrying another woman, and tried to kill her to cover up his past. This fictional couple are also popular in legends.

== Chinese opera ==
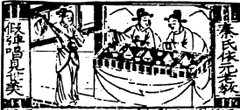
An illustration from a 1594 copy of the novel Legal Cases of A Hundred Families Judged by Dragon-Design Bao (包龍圖判百家公案) depicting Chen Shimei in a banquet listening to his abandoned wife Lady Qin disguised as a pipa player.

The story of Beijing opera “[Chen Shi] Mei’s Beheading Case” (鍘美案)：

In the Song Dynasty, Chen Shimei (陳世美) was a poor scholar studying for the imperial examinations. Chen Shimei was married to Qin Xianglian (秦香蓮), who took care of him, his parents, and their children so Chen Shimei had time to study. When the time for the examinations came, Shimei went to the capital to take them, leaving Xianglian and their children behind. He did not return. In the meantime, a famine hit the country and killed their parents. With nothing left in the countryside, Xianglian and the children traveled to the capital to look for Shimei.

It turned out that Shimei had placed first in the examinations and had been awarded an official post as a result. The Emperor favored him, and offered to marry his sister to Shimei. Although Shimei was already married, he coveted wealth and power; he kept his previous marriage a secret and married the princess, hoping to forget about Xianglian and their children. This put Shimei in a bind when Xianglian came to the capital. Still, aware that his position was in danger plus that he had lied to the Emperor to marry the princess, Shimei not only claimed to not know Xianglian and their children, but also secretly ordered his bodyguard Han Qi (韓琪) to murder them.

Han Qi cornered Xianglian outside the capital. However, when Xianglian begged Han Qi to raise her children after her death, Han Qi could not bring himself to kill them. Caught between his conscience and duty, Han Qi committed suicide in Sanguantang (三官堂). After burying Han Qi, Xianglian approached Bao Zheng to force Shimei to recognize her. Bao Zheng sent a subordinate to Shimei and Xianglian's hometown, verifying Xianglian's story. He then planned to have Xianglian confront Shimei in court, and tried to give Shimei another chance to recognize Xianglian as his first wife, for their children's sake. Instead, Shimei again denied knowing Xianglian. When Shimei denied sending an assassin to kill Xianglian as well, Xianglian proved that Shimei was lying by showing the court Han Qi's sword. Bao Zheng convicted Shimei for attempted murder and for lying to the Emperor, the punishment for which was death.

When the princess heard of the impending execution, she was aggrieved that Shimei had lied to her, but also did not want to become a widow. Therefore, she went with her mother, the Empress Dowager, to pressure Bao Zheng to stop the execution. Bao Zheng refused. However, when the Emperor issued an edict pardoning Shimei, Bao Zheng was left with no choice but to obey. Lamenting that justice would not be served, he offered Xianglian some money and planned to resign from office. Xianglian refused the gift, crying so hard about how the officials were shielding each other that she fainted. Ordering his subordinates to help Xianglian, Bao Zheng indignantly resolved to proceed with the execution. When the Empress Dowager pointed out that the penalty for defying an imperial edict was also death, Bao Zheng took off his official headwear and declared that Shimei should be executed before himself. Shimei was executed. Afterwards, peasants throughout the country gave Bao Zheng the honorific "Justice Bao" (包青天).

After the foundation of the People's Republic of China, Changchun Film Studio (長春電影製片廠) produced the colorful opera film “Qin Xianglian” in 1964 to preserve the stagecraft of Beijing opera performers such as Zhang Junqiu (張君秋), Ma Lianliang (馬連良), Li Duokui (李多奎) and Qiu Shengrong (裘盛戎).

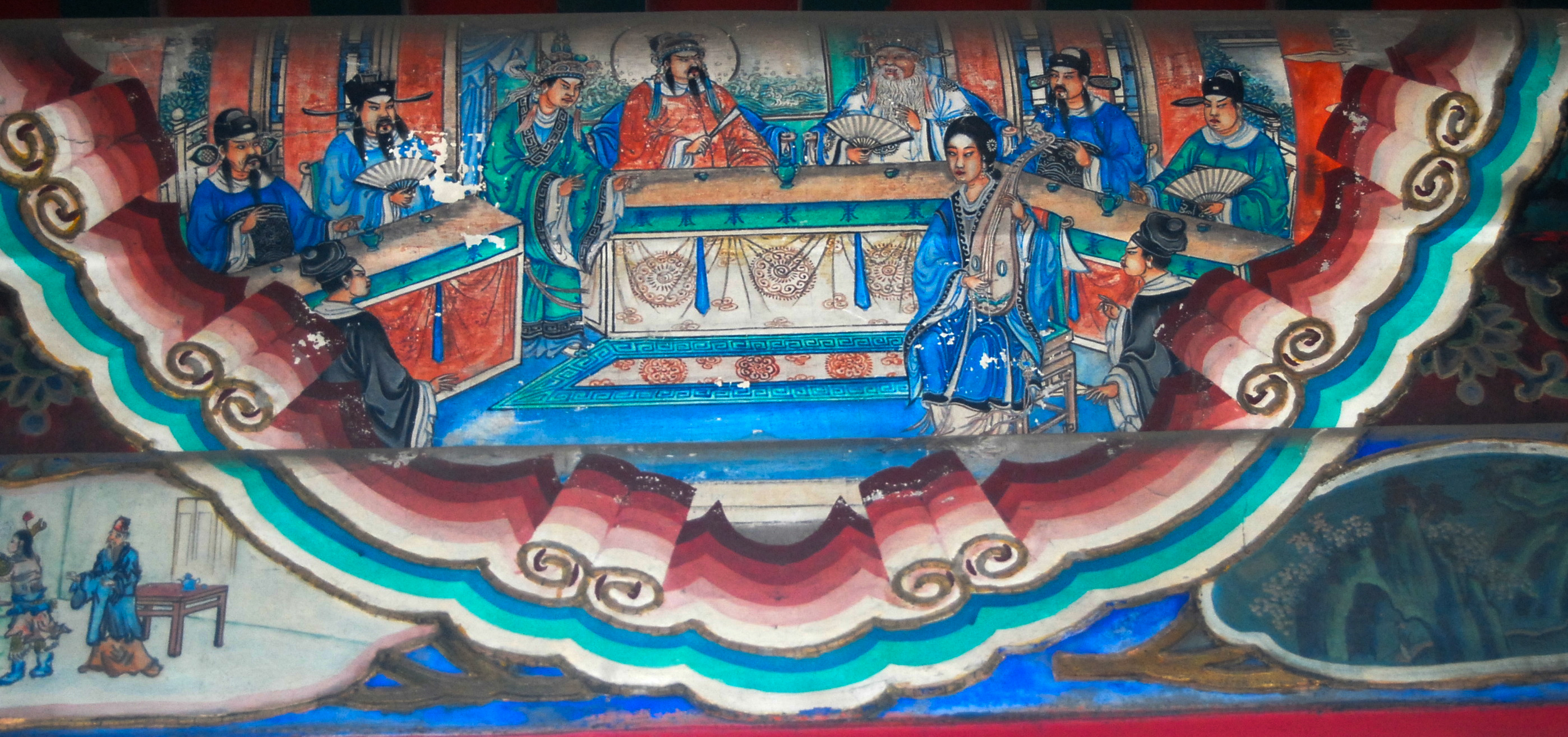
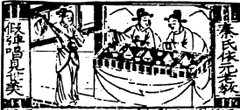
(Top) A mural from Long Corridor, Summer Palace, Beijing, China, depicting Qin playing a pipa during a banquet attended by Chen. (Bottom) The exact same scene from the 1594 copy of the novel Legal Cases of A Hundred Families Judged by Dragon-Design Bao (包龍圖判百家公案).

== Coincidence ==
Chen Shimei first appearance was in the Ming dynasty (1363–1644) novel “Bao Zheng’s Cases” (包公案). In the novel, Qin Xianglian first appeared as Lady Qin (秦氏) without a given name (like most women recorded in imperial China's literature).

Coincidentally, according to Local Records of Junzhou and the Dictionary of Hubei Historical Figures, there was a figure named Chen Shumei (陳熟美), originally named Chen Niangu (陳年谷) who lived during the Qing dynasty (1636–1912). He was a native of Junzhou who travelled to Beijing for further studies after passing the imperial examination. Chen Shumei has a wife name Qin Xinglian (秦馨蓮). Like Bao Zheng, Chen was an upright official who eventually became an enemy of other corrupted officials. These officials rewrote the ending of the infamous "Mei's Beheading Case" opera, changing the middle Chinese characters of their real names and brought Bao Zheng of the Song dynasty era into their fictitious story to slander and smear Chen Shumei and his wife Qin Xinglian.

Hence, the literary character Chen Shimei has no connection to the historical figure.

== In popular culture ==
An Internet meme called "Ching Cheng Hanji" is a name given to the Blaxy Girls song called "If You Feel My Love (Chaow Remix)" that samples the line "近前看其 詳上寫著 秦香蓮年三十 二歲那狀告當朝 駙馬郎 欺君王瞞皇上 那悔婚男兒招東床", which became popular in late 2019. The song is often paired with a clip from the 1942 Tom and Jerry short Puss n' Toots, depicting Tom spinning on a phonograph with a record on his head. In 2021 the song was used in another meme parodying the proposed Chinese Social Credit System in which one is asked questions about China. If they are answered in a way that opposes the official narrative provided by the Chinese government (e.g. acknowledging the Tiananmen Square Massacre) one is berated and/or punished. Similarly, if one answers "correctly" they are rewarded with more Social Credit Points.

== Portrayal in film and television ==
=== Chen Shimei ===
- Peter Yang in The Story of Ching Hsiang-lien (1964)
- Yang Huai-min in Justice Pao (1993)
- Ding Zhicheng in The New Case of Beheading Chen Shimei (2004)
- Wang Hao in Justice Bao (2008)
- Benny Chan in Qin Xianglian (2011)

=== Qin Xianglian ===
- Li Lihua in The Story of Ching Hsiang-lien (1964)
- Leanne Liu in Justice Pao (1993)
- Hao Lei in The New Case of Beheading Chen Shimei (2004)
- Chen Ting in Justice Bao (2008)
- Zhou Zihan in Female Constable (2011)
- Mabel Yuan in Qin Xianglian (2011)

== See also ==
- Bao Zheng

== Bibliography ==
- “A Hundred Legal Cases of Bao Zheng’s Cases”, Chapter 26, ‘Qing Xianglian’s Revial from the Death’
- "China National Peking Opera Company". Archived from the original on July 23, 2011.
- "full length video of this opera with background in English".
- Yuan, Haiwang (2006). "The Magic Lotus Lantern" and Other Tales from the Han Chinese. Libraries Unlimited. ISBN 1-59158-294-6.
