= Jin Chao-chun =

Taiwanese actor

- 金超群
- Born: 26 November 1951 (age 74); Taipei County, Taiwan
- Education: Fu Hsing Kang College
- Occupations: Actor, screenwriter, television producer
- Years active: 1979–present
- Agent: Chao-chun Film Studio (founder)
- Spouse: Chi Chen (m. 1987)
- Awards: Golden Bell Awards – Best Actor in a TV Series; 1995 Justice Bao – Bao Zheng

Chinese name
- Chinese: 金超群
Transcriptions
Standard Mandarin
- Hanyu Pinyin: Jīn Chāo Qún
Yue: Cantonese
- Jyutping: Gam^{1} Ciu^{1} Kwan^{4}

Jin Chao-chun (Chinese: 金超群; born on 26 November 1951) is a Golden Bell Award-winning Taiwanese actor who achieved regional fame in East Asia and Southeast Asia chosen by his classmate Zhao Dashen for his portrayal of the ancient Chinese official Bao Zheng in the 1993 TV series Justice Bao. By 2012 he has portrayed Bao Zheng in over 700 episodes of television series produced in Taiwan, Hong Kong, mainland China and Singapore. In 1997, he financed the construction of "Chao-chun Film Studio" in Qingdao, China to film Bao Zheng-related television drama.

== Filmography ==
=== Films ===
Year	Title	Role	Notes
1979	The Fate (索命三娘)		
1994	Family Affairs (清官難審)		
1995	No Justice for All (真相)		
2005	A Game of Cat and Mouse (包青天之五鼠鬥御貓)	Bao Zheng	also screenwriter

=== Television ===
Year	Title	Role	Notes
1974	Justice Bao (1974 TV series) (包青天)	Gongsun Ce	Mid-end season
1986	Imperial Consort Yang (楊貴妃)	Gao Lishi	
1988	Eight Thousand Li of Cloud and Moon (八千里路雲和月)	Qin Hui	
1989	A Courageous Clan: Mu Kuei-ying (一門英烈穆桂英)	Kou Zhun	
1993	Justice Bao (1993 TV series) (包青天)	Bao Zheng	Won—Golden Bell Award for Best Actor in a TV Series
1994	Heavenly Ghost Catcher (天師鍾馗)	Zhong Kui & Bao Zheng	
1994	Justice Bao (新包青天)	Bao Zheng	
1994	Heroic Legend of the Yang's Family (碧血青天楊家將)	Bao Zheng	
1995	Heavenly Ghost Catcher 2 (天師鍾馗II)	Zhong Kui	
1998	Thunderstorm Rider (霹靂菩薩)	Monk Stone	
2000	Return of Judge Bao (包公出巡)	Bao Zheng	also co-producer
2000	Mysterious Cases of Judge Bao (包公奇案)	Bao Zheng	
2007	Legends of Bai Yutang (包青天之白玉堂傳奇)	Bao Zheng	
2008	Justice Bao (包青天)	Bao Zheng	also screenwriter
2010	Justice Bao 1 (包青天之七俠五義)	Bao Zheng	also producer
2011	Justice Bao 2 (包青天之碧血丹心)	Bao Zheng	also producer
2012	Justice Bao 3 (包青天之開封奇案)	Bao Zheng	also producer
