= Inside the Forbidden City =

1965 Hong Kong film by Kao Li

Inside The Forbidden City
- Hong Kong movie poster

Chinese name
- Traditional Chinese: 宋宮秘史
- Simplified Chinese: 宋宫秘史
Transcriptions
Standard Mandarin
- Hanyu Pinyin: Sòng Gōng Mì Shǐ
Yue: Cantonese
- Jyutping: Sung^{3} Gung^{1} Bei^{3} Si^{2}
- Directed by: Kao Li
- Written by: Kao Li; Chang Cheh
- Produced by: Run Run Shaw
- Starring: Ivy Ling Po; Cheng Miu; Go Bo-shu; Ouyang Sha-fei; Chin Feng
- Cinematography: Tung Shao-Yung
- Edited by: Chiang Hsing-Lung
- Music by: Joseph Koo
- Distributed by: Shaw Brothers Studio
- Release date: 1965
- Running time: 98 minutes
- Country: Hong Kong
- Language: Mandarin

Inside The Forbidden City is a 1965 Hong Kong Huangmei opera musical film. Depicted is the famous tale known as "Civet for Crown Prince" which allegedly took place in China's Song dynasty.

== Synopsis ==
While passing through the town of Caoqiao, the famous Song dynasty official Bao Zheng is stopped by a villager on behalf of his blind mother. Bao discovers that the blind woman was Consort Li, a concubine of the late Emperor Zhenzong.

Twenty years ago, right after Li gave birth to a son, a jealous rival Consort Liu conspired with eunuch Guo Huai to have the infant swapped with a dead civet. She then ordered her maid Kou Zhu to throw the baby into the river. At the Jinshui Bridge, a hesitant Kou was approached by eunuch Chen Lin. Chen was able to carry the infant to Eighth Imperial Prince, one of Zhenzong's brothers, who raised the baby as one of his own. Eventually the baby became crown prince as Zhenzong had no other sons.

As a result of giving birth to a monster, Li was banished to Yu Chen Palace, while Liu was elevated to the status of Empress. One day, the 10-year-old crown prince wandered to the forbidden palace and met Li. Liu came upon them and became suspicious. She convinced Zhenzong that Li was cursed and needed to be burned to death along with her palace. Kou ran off to warn Li and was interrogated harshly when she returned. After Kou killed herself by slamming into a pillar, Guo and the soldiers went to Yu Chen Palace to carry out the burning order, when they saw a hanged body with Li's clothing. Unbeknownst to them, eunuch Yu Zhong had sacrificed himself, allowing Li to escape.

The crown prince had become Emperor Renzong, and Bao uses the Lantern Festival for an opportunity to tell him the story. Then, Bao tricks Guo to the Kaifeng court but Guo stubbornly refuses to confess. Playing on Guo's fear of the supernatural, Bao invokes the "Ghost of Kou Zhu" to finally get a confession. Liu is ordered to commit suicide while Renzong welcomes his mother back to the palace.

== Cast ==
- Ivy Ling Po as Kou Zhu
- Cheng Miu as Bao Zheng
- Go Bo-shu as Consort Liu
- Ouyang Sha-fei as Consort Li
- Chan Yau-san as Guo Huai
- Goo Man-chung as Chen Lin
- Chin Feng as Emperor Zhenzong of Song & Emperor Renzong of Song
- Yeung Chi-hing as Eighth Prince
- Chan Wan-ma as Princess Di
- Tien Feng as Pang Ji
- Fan Dan as Bao Xing
- Fung Ngai as Wang Chao
- Kwan Yan as Ma Han
- Tsui Kwan-sang as Zhang Long
- Wong Nin as Zhao Hu
- Fuk Yan-cheng as Qin Feng
- Lee Ching as Ghost of Kou Zhu

=== Huangmei opera dubbing ===
- Ivy Ling Po as Kou Zhu
- Tsui Ping as Consort Li
- Kiang Hung as Bao Zheng
