= Huang An (singer) =

Taiwanese singer and writer (born 1962)

Michael Huang An
- Born: Huang Hongming; 8 December 1962 (age 63); Zhubei, Hsinchu County, Taiwan
- Education: National Pingtung School of Agriculture
- Occupations: Comedian, singer, television personality, writer
- Years active: 1989–2010
- Children: 1

Chinese name
- Chinese: 黄安
Transcriptions
Standard Mandarin
- Hanyu Pinyin: Huáng Ān
- Website: weibo.com/huangan

Michael Huang An (Chinese: 黃安; born 8 December 1962) is a Taiwanese comedian, singer, television host, and writer, best known for his 1992 hit song "The New Mandarin Ducks and Butterflies Dream", the ending theme of the mega-hit television series Justice Pao (1993), and the album of the same name, which ranks as one of Taiwan's best-selling albums of all time.

== Life and career ==
Huang was born Huang Hongming (黃宏銘) in Zhubei, Hsinchu County, Taiwan on 8 December 1962, with ancestral roots in Zhangzhou, Fujian Province. He graduated from National Pingtung School of Agriculture.

He released his first album, All from the Beginning (一切從頭), in 1989. In 1993, he released his breakthrough record, The New Mandarin Ducks and Butterflies Dream (新鴛鴦蝴蝶夢), which sold one million copies in Taiwan and six million worldwide. It ranks as Taiwan's 10th best-selling album of all time.

He subsequently released several more records, including the critically acclaimed Save the Marriage (救姻緣, 1994), The Old Mandarin Ducks and Butterflies Dream (舊鴛鴦蝴蝶夢, 1997), Sister I Love You (1998), Great Compassion Mantra (大悲咒, 1999, for relief of the 1999 Jiji earthquake), Best of Huang An (2000), Affirmative Sentence (2012), as well as several singles.

Huang wrote and published three books: The Dark Side of the Moon (1998), Who Ruined the Entertainment Industry? (2003), and Who Ruined Marriage? (2004). He has hosted numerous television programs, first in Taiwan, and then in mainland China since 2001.

== Hit songs ==
- "The New Mandarin Ducks and Butterflies Dream", theme song of the 1992 film Passionate Dream (劍霸天下) and the 1993 TV series Justice Pao
- "Accompanying You to the End of the World" (陪你到天涯), theme song of the 1992 TV series The Sky Beyond the Loesses (黃土地外的天空) and the 1994 TV series Young Justice Bao
- "Save the Marriage" (救姻緣), theme song of the 1994 TV series The Seven Heroes and Five Gallants and Young Justice Bao

== Politics ==
Huang An is well known for his strong anti-Taiwan Independence stance. He has publicized what he perceives to be anti-Chinese sentiments by his colleagues in the entertainment circle, causing them to be blacklisted from mainland entertainment shows. Taiwanese singer Crowd Lu and Hong Kong actor Wong He were among his targets, having their careers adversely affected by his posts on social media. His criticism of K-pop singer Chou Tzu-yu for waving a Taiwanese flag on South Korean television led to Chou's public video apology just before the 2016 Taiwan election, sparking an outrage in Taiwan.

In 2025, he was among the 40 individuals who are being investigated by the Mainland Affairs Council over Chinese ID ownership. If proven, it would risk him losing his Taiwanese citizenship.

== Personal life ==
Huang has a daughter, Emily, and a granddaughter nicknamed Cutie Huang.
