= Kou Zhu =

Fictional Song dynasty palace maid

Kou Zhu carrying the newborn crown prince running into Chen Lin at Gold Water Bridge. An illustration from a 1918 print of the book Collection of Yuan Plays (元曲選) published by Hanfenlou.

Kou Zhu (寇珠, also translated as "Pearl") is a fictional Song dynasty palace maid popular in legends related to Emperor Renzong of Song, Emperor Zhenzong of Song, Concubine Li and Empress Liu.

In the 19th-century novel The Seven Heroes and Five Gallants, she is credited with saving the newborn Emperor Renzong: when her master Concubine Liu ordered her to strangle him and dump his body under a bridge, she gave the infant to the eunuch Chen Lin instead. Years later, she was tortured by Liu (then already the empress thanks to her conspiracy) and her eunuch Guo Huai, and committed suicide. Still years later, Bao Zheng and his chief strategist Gongsun Ce "invoked her ghost" to extract a confession out of Guo.

She first appeared in writing in the play Chen Lin Carrying the Filigree Box at Gold Water Bridge (金水橋陳琳抱粧盒) from the 1615 volume Collections of Yuan Plays (元曲選), in which she was simply called Palace Maid Kou (寇承禦, "Kou Chengyu") without a given name.

== Worship ==
Dragon-Mother Temple (龍母宮), a temple in Xinshi District, Baoding, Hebei, China, is a temple dedicated to the worship of Kou Zhu. It was likely built in the Ming dynasty (1368–1644), but local folk legends claim it was built by Emperor Renzong (1010–1063) to commemorate his savior.

== Portrayal in film and television ==
- Ivy Ling Po in Inside the Forbidden City (1965)
- Chang Hsiao-yen in The Secret History of the Song Palace (1974)
- Hsu Hsiu-nien in Exchanging A Wild Cat for the Crown Prince (1984)
- Hu Huiling in Justice Pao (1993)
- Sun Huining in The Song Dynasty Stunning Legend (2004)
- Huang Hui in Struggle for Imperial Power (2005)
- Shen Yunzhou in Justice Bao (2008)

== Citations ==
- Blader, Susan (1998). Tales of Magistrate Bao and His Valiant Lieutenants: Selections from Sanxia Wuyi. The Chinese University Press. ISBN 962-201-775-4.
