= Wanhua Lou =

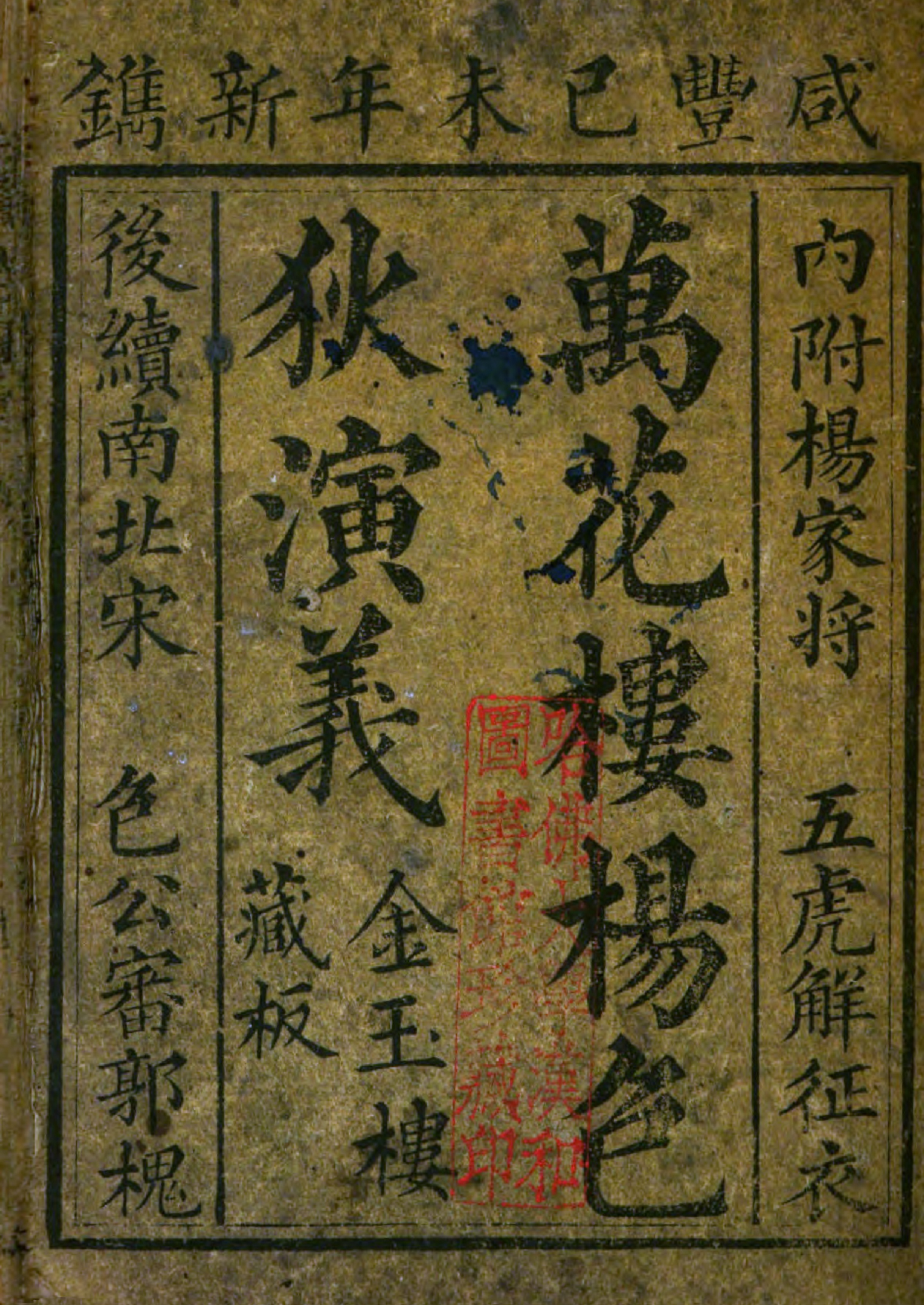
Front cover of the novel Wanhua Lou

Inside the page of a later expanded edition from 1876

Wanhua Lou (traditional Chinese: 萬花樓; simplified Chinese: 万花楼), also translated into English as Pavilion of Myriad Flowers and Pavilion of Ten Thousand Flowers, is a Chinese novel written by Li Yutang (李雨堂) during the Qing dynasty. The novel's story is set in the Song dynasty and consist of 68 chapters. Its first edition was published in 1808, with later expanded editions releasing throughout the following decades.
