= Justice Pao (1993 TV series) =

- Promotional poster
- Also known as: Judge Bao; Justice Bao
- Simplified Chinese: 包青天
- Hanyu Pinyin: Bāo Qīng Tiān
- Genre: Crime fiction Historical fiction Wuxia; Gong'an fiction Fantasy; Period; Tragedy drama
- Starring: Jin Chao-chun; Kenny Ho; Fan Hung-hsuan
- Opening theme: "Bāo Qīng Tiān" (包青天) performed by Hu Gua (胡瓜)
- Ending theme: 1. "New Dream of the Butterfly Couple" (新鴛鴦蝴蝶夢) performed by Huang An; 2. "Hand in Hand, Let's Travel the World" (攜手遊人間) performed by Chang Chen
- Composer: Hsi Yu-lung
- Country of origin: Taiwan
- Original language: Mandarin
- No. of seasons: 10
- No. of episodes: 236

Production
- Producer: Chao Ta-shen
- Running time: 45 minutes/episode

Original release
- Network: CTS
- Release: February 23, 1993 – January 18, 1994

Related
- Justice Bao (2008); Justice Bao (2010–2012)

Justice Bao
- Chinese: 包青天
Transcriptions
Standard Mandarin
- Hanyu Pinyin: Bāo Qīng Tiān
- Wade–Giles: Pao^{1} Ch'ing^{1} T'ien^{1}
Yue: Cantonese
- Jyutping: Baau^{1} Cing^{1} Tin^{1}

Justice Pao is a 236-episode television series from Taiwan, first airing on Chinese Television System (CTS) from February 1993 to January 1994.

== Background ==
The show stars Jin Chao-chun as the legendary Song dynasty official Bao Zheng. It was hugely popular in many countries in East Asia and Southeast Asia.

The series was originally planned to have just 15 episodes. However, the show had high ratings when the initial episodes aired. Due to its popularity, CTS extended the show to 236 episodes.

The rival TVB and ATV Home networks in Hong Kong both bought the series in an attempt to gain viewers. Competition between the two networks during the series’ run was so intense that identical episodes were shown on both channels on the same night. It was also one of the first dramas that used NICAM technology (Dual Sound Switch Cantonese/Mandarin).

== List of cases ==
Case	ep. #	Chinese Title	English Translation
#1	6	鍘美案 (Zhá Mĕi Àn)	The Case of Chen Shimei
#2	5	真假狀元 (Zhēn Jiă Zhuàng Yuán)	The Real and Fake Principal Graduate
#3	7	狸貓換太子 (Lí Māo Huàn Tài Zĭ)	Beating the Dragon Robe
#4	3	雙釘記 (Shuāng Dīng Jì)	The Tale of Two Nails
#5	4	探陰山 (Tàn Yīn Shān)	The Trek to the Underworld
#6	4	紅花記 (Hóng Huā Jì)	The Tale of the Red Flowers
#7	5	鍘龐昱 (Zhá Páng Yù)	The Execution of Pang Yu
#8	9	鍘包勉 (Zhá Bāo Miăn)	The Execution of Bao Mian
#9	3	烏盆記 (Wū Pén Jì)	The Tale of the Black Pot
#10	5	秋娘 (Qiū Niáng)	Qiu Niang
#11	4	鍘王爺 (Zhá Wáng Yé)	The Execution of the Prince
#12	5	古琴怨 (Gŭ Qín Yuàn)	Resentment of the Guqin
#13	9	三擊鼓 (Sān Jī Gŭ)	The Thrice-hit Drum
#14	5	攣生劫 (Luán Shēng Jié)	The Tale of Twin Brothers
#15	5	報恩亭 (Bào Ēn Tíng)	The Temple of Retribution
#16	5	真假女婿 (Zhēn Jiă Nǚ Xù)	The Real and Fake Son-in-Law
#17	4	紫金錘 (Zĭ Jīn Chuí)	The Purple Hammer
#18	9	天下第一莊 (Tiān Xià Dì Yī Zhuāng)	The Number One Manor
#19	5	寸草心 (Cùn Căo Xīn)	The Mind of Kindness
#20	8	屠龍記 (Tú Lóng Jì)	The Tale of Dragon Slayers
#21	5	鴛鴦蝴蝶夢 (Yuān Yāng Hú Dié Mèng)	The Dream of the Butterfly Lovers
#22	6	天倫劫 (Tiān Lún Jié)	The Rules of the Lord
#23	6	孔雀膽 (Kŏng Què Dăn)	Peacock Gall (A type of poison)
#24	6	真假包公 (Zhēn Jiă Bāo Gōng)	The Duel of Baos
#25	6	貞節牌坊 (Zhēn Jié Pái Făng)	The Widow's Board
#26	5	血雲幡傳奇 (Xuè Yún Fān Chuán Qí)	The Legend of the Blood-thirsty Flag
#27	7	生死戀 (Shēng Sĭ Liàn)	Love Between Life and Death
#28	6	尋親記 (Xún Qīn Jì)	The Story of Seeking Beloved Ones
#29	6	踏雪尋梅 (Tà Xuĕ Xún Méi)	Searching for Plum Blossom in the Snow
#30	6	青龍珠 (Qīng Lóng Zhū)	The Azure Dragon Pearl
#31	6	魚美人 (Yú Mĕi Rén)	The Mermaid Angel
#32	5	狄青 (Dí Qīng)	Di Qing
#33	7	孝子章洛 (Xiào Zĭ Zhāng Luò)	Zhang Luo, the Filial Son
#34	7	雷霆怒 (Léi Tíng Nù)	Heaven's Wrath
#35	7	陰陽判 (Yīn Yáng Pàn)	The Fortunes of Yin and Yang
#36	6	九道本 (Jiŭ Dào Bĕn)	Nine Letters to the King
#37	6	菩薩嶺 (Pú Sà Lĭng)	Buddha's Peak
#38	6	畫中話 (Huà Zhōng Huà)	Mystery of the Painting
#39	6	龐妃有喜 (Páng Fēi Yŏu Xĭ)	Consort Pang's Pregnancy
#40	6	乞丐王孫 (Qĭ Gài Wáng Sūn)	The Beggar Princess
#41	5	五鼠鬧東京 (Wŭ Shŭ Nào Dōng Jīng)	Five Rats in the Eastern Capital

== Cast ==
Note: Some cast members played multiple roles.

Cast	Role	Description
Jin Chao-chun	Bao Zheng	Prefect of Kaifeng, capital of Song Dynasty
Kenny Ho	Zhan Zhao	"Southern Hero", "Royal Cat", 4th-ranked imperial guard
Fan Hung-hsuan	Gongsun Ce	Bao Zheng's secretary
Kao Nien-kuo	Wang Chao	Bao Zheng's officer
Hsu Chien-yu (C.1–21)	Ma Han	Bao Zheng's officer
Liu Yueh-ti (C.22–41)	Ma Han	Bao Zheng's officer
Yang Hsiung	Zhang Long	Bao Zheng's officer
Shao Chang-sheng	Zhao Hu	Bao Zheng's officer
Sun Peng (C.1)	Zhao Zhen	"Emperor Renzong", 4th emperor of Song Dynasty
Wang Chung-huang (C.2–28)	Zhao Zhen	"Emperor Renzong", 4th emperor of Song Dynasty
Shih Yu (C.29–41)	Zhao Zhen	"Emperor Renzong", 4th emperor of Song Dynasty
Hou Ping-ying		Emperor Renzong's sister
Yang Huai-min	Chen Shimei	married to Emperor Renzong's sister
Yang Ping-an	Han Qi	Chen Shimei's guard
Leanne Liu	Qin Xianglian	Chen Shimei's original wife
Tsao Chien	Wang Yan Ling	Song Dynasty chancellor
Lung Lung	Zhao Defang	"Eighth Virtuous Prince", Emperor Renzong's uncle, and the name in real life history is Zhao Yuanyan
Han Hsiang-chin (C.3)	Princess Di	Eighth Virtuous Prince's wife
Yin Pao-lien (C.32)	Princess Di	Eighth Virtuous Prince's wife
Liu Yueh-ti	Zhao Heng	"Emperor Zhenzong", Emperor Renzong's father and predecessor
Lu Pi-yun (C.1)	Empress; Dowager Liu	Emperor Zhenzong's wife
Hsiao Ai (C.3)	Empress; Dowager Liu	Emperor Zhenzong's wife
Tai Chih-yuan	Guo Huai	eunuch for Empress Dowager Liu
Tseng Ya-chun	Consort Li	Emperor Renzong's real mother
Wen Shuai	Chen Lin	eunuch
Tu Man-sheng	Pang Ji	Song Dynasty grand tutor
Chen Chi	Consort Pang	Pang Ji's daughter, married to Emperor Renzong
Doze Niu	Pang Yu	Pang Ji's son
Liu Chu	Pang Fu	Pang Yu's servant
Chang Kuo-chu	Lu Fang	"Sky Rat", 1st sworn brother
Wu Yuan-chun	Han Zhang	"Earth Rat", 2nd sworn brother
Pang San	Xu Qing	"Mountain Rat", 3rd sworn brother
Lu Yi-lung	Jiang Ping	"River Rat", 4th sworn brother
Chang Chen-huan (C.3–6)	Bai Yutang	"Sleek Rat", 5th sworn brother
Goo Goon-chung (C.41)	Bai Yutang	"Sleek Rat", 5th sworn brother
Tai Chih-yuan	Bao Mian	Bao Zheng's same-aged nephew
Liu Ming	Wu Miaozhen	Bao Zheng's eldest sister-in-law and motherly figure, Bao Mian's mother
Chang Fu-chien	Di Qing	Song Dynasty general, Princess Di's nephew

== Awards ==
1995 – 30th Golden Bell Awards

- Won – Jin Chao-chun, Best Actor
- Won – Tai Chih-yuan, Best Supporting Actor, for the portrayal of Guo Huai (Case 3)
- Won – Liu Ming, Best Supporting Actress, for the portrayal of Bao Mian's mother (Case 8)

== Theme songs ==
1. The opening theme, performed by Hu Kua, has the same title as the series. It was originally performed by the late Chiang Kuang-Chao for the earlier 1974 CTS series also of the same name.

- The ending credits song in Stephen Chow's Hong Kong comedy movie Hail the Judge was based on the opening theme of Justice Bao.
- A Cantonese cover ("願世間有青天") performed by George Lam with lyrics by Wong Jim was the opening theme of the series on TVB in Hong Kong. It was also the opening theme of the 1995 TVB series Justice Bao.
- Another Cantonese cover by Ray Lui was the opening theme of the 1995 ATV series Justice Bao.
- A Tagalog cover ("Katarungan Ay Si Judge Bao") was the opening theme of the series on ABC-5 in the Philippines Produced By 20 Plus Entertainment.
- Andy Lau covered the song in the 2003 Bao Zheng-related movie Cat and Mouse.
- Cambodian version was performed by Nou Sib which aired on CTV9 in 1994 and Neay Koy which air on CTN in 2020 (as he performed in 2001)

2. The ending theme was "New Dream of the Butterfly Lovers" (Chinese: 新鴛鴦蝴蝶夢; pinyin: Xīn Yuānyāng Húdié Mèng), written and performed by Huang An.

- This song became a huge hit in the Chinese-speaking world, and Huang's album with the same name became one of the best-selling albums in Taiwan, selling over a million copies.
- Cover versions in many languages exist due to the show's influence in the region. Kenny Ho recorded a Cantonese version (also "新鴛鴦蝴蝶夢") with lyrics by Albert Leung, while Huang An and Loletta Lee each recorded a different Cantonese version (both titled "愛於錯誤年代" but the lyrics differ). A popular English version from the Singaporean band Tokyo Square was titled "Can't Let Go". Huang An's own English version was titled "When It Comes to Love". There are also versions in Hokkien ("鴛鴦蝴蝶夢" by Joice Lim), Thai ("สุดจะหยุดใจ" by Koong Tuangsith Reamchinda), Vietnamese ("Uyên Ương Hồ Điệp Mộng" by Đan Trường), Khmer ("ផ្ការោយមុនរដូវ" by Nou Sib and "ព្រួយជាមួយចន្ទ" by Khemarak Sereymon) and Indonesian ("Melody Memory" by Lavenia), among others.

3. Another ending theme song used for some episodes was "Hand in Hand, Let's Travel the World" (Chinese: 攜手遊人間; lit. 'Traveling the World Hand in Hand').

== International broadcast ==
- (Cambodia) : Channel 9
- (Indonesia) : Indonesian Educational Television (1995).
- (Malaysia) : Metrovision (1995)
- : Myawady Television (1998), Myanmar Radio and Television (2018 - with Burmese dub), Sky Net Channel 9 Myanmar (2019)
- (Philippines) : RPN (1996-2000), ABC 5 (2007-2008)
- (Singapore) : Channel 8
- (Thailand) : Channel 3 (1995; rerun was broadcast in 2006, 2015 and again since 2024)
- (Thailand) : NEW18 (April 6, 2020 - March 28, 2021 (Every Monday - Sunday from 16: 35-17: 35))
- (Vietnam) : HanoiTV (1996)
- (South Korea) : KBS2 (1994-1996)

== Video game adaptations ==
On the first few years after its original run ended, at least three video game adaptations of the series were published in Asia. It is unknown if any of them were licensed by CTS.

The first adaptation was the homonymous beat 'em up 包青天 (Bāo Qīng Tiān), published in 1994 by Bit Corporation for the Gamate handheld console in Taiwan. It is the only one out of the three that was licensed by the console manufacturer. Its higher quality and overall polish and country of origin may also be a pointer for it being officially licensed by CTS, although that is uncertain.

The second and third adaptations were both released in mainland China in 1996 for the Nintendo Entertainment System, and it is unclear which went to market first. The most well-known out of the two, usually cited as the first, is a platformer also titled Bāo Qīng Tiān, published by Kai Sheng in Hong Kong and by Family TSI in Thailand. The second is a fighting game titled Impartial Judge, published by Fuzhou Waixing in China.
