= Jun Prefecture =

Historical administrative division in Hubei, China

Junzhou or either Jun Prefecture (均州) was a zhou (prefecture) in imperial China, seated in modern Danjiangkou, Hubei, China. It existed (intermittently) between the years 585 and 1912.

== Geography ==
The administrative region of Junzhou in the Tang dynasty is in modern Shiyan and Hubei. It probably includes parts of modern Shiyan, Danjiankou and Yun County.
