= Zhan Zhao =

Fictional Chinese character

- Wuxia character
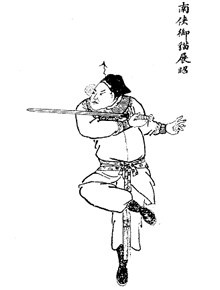
- from one 1890 print of the novel
- Created by: Shi Yukun

In-universe information
- Nicknames: Southern Hero (南俠); Imperial Cat (御貓)
- Gender: Male
- Spouse: Ding Yuehua (丁月华)
- Relatives: Elder brother: Zhan Hui (展輝) Zhan Yao (展耀); Nephew: Zhan Guodong (展國棟); Niece: Zhan Xiaoxia (展小霞)
- Home: Wujin, Changzhou
- Nationality: Chinese

Zhan Zhao
- Chinese: 展昭
Transcriptions
Standard Mandarin
- Hanyu Pinyin: Zhǎn Zhāo
- Wade–Giles: Chan^{3} Chao^{1}
Yue: Cantonese
- Yale Romanization: Jin^{2} Chiu^{1}
- Jyutping: Zin^{2} Ciu^{1}

Zhan Zhao (展昭) is a fictional character in the Chinese wuxia classic The Seven Heroes and Five Gallants. Nicknamed the "Nánxiá" (南俠, Southern Hero), he is a righteous knight-errant with incredible martial arts skills, often helping Prefect Bao Zheng uphold justice. Emperor Renzong of Song made him a 4th rank royal guard and gave him the title "Yùmāo" (御貓, Imperial Cat) for his swift movements.

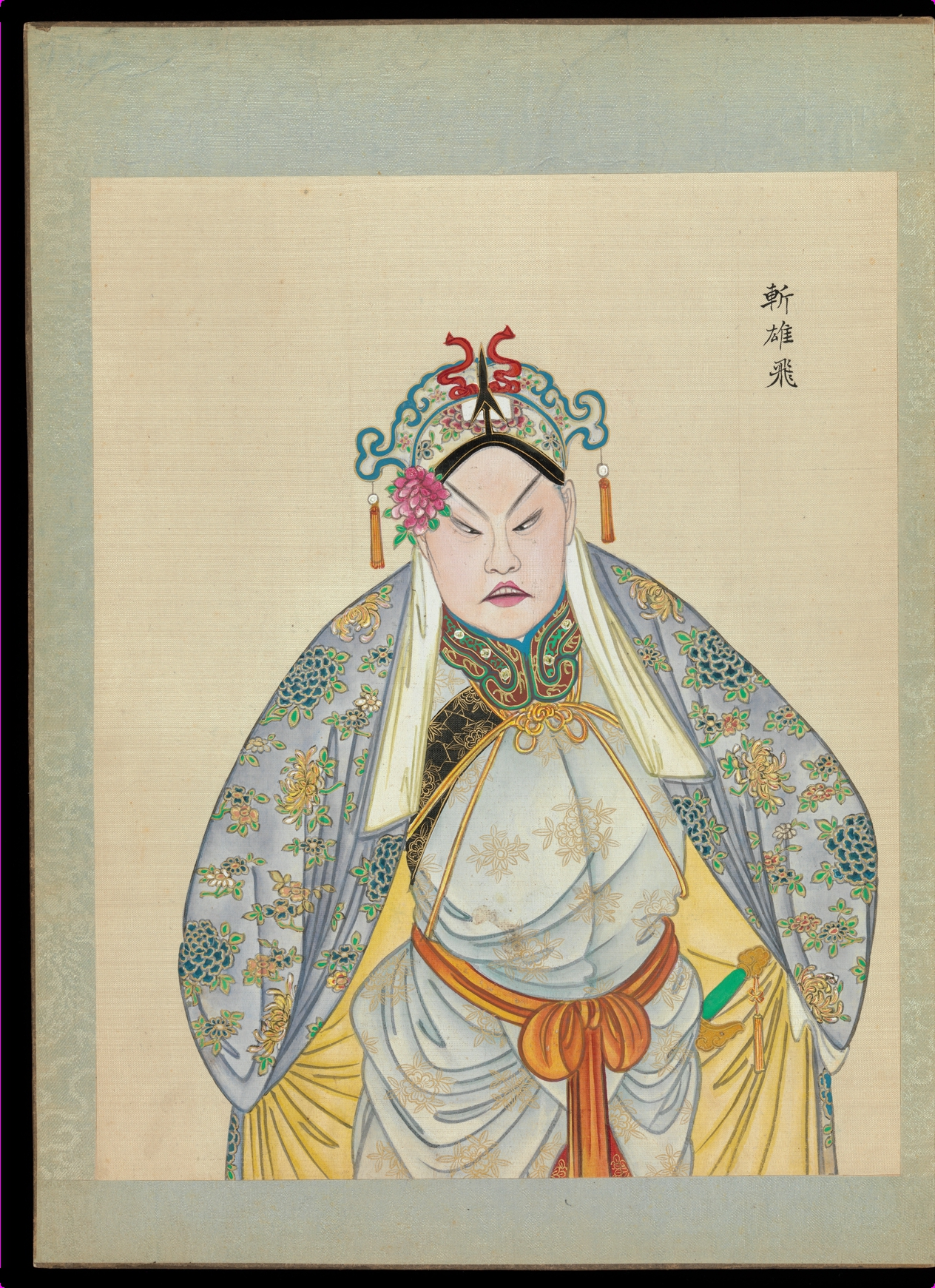
Zhan Zhao in a Chinese Peking Opera Figure Painting Book

== Stories ==
=== Saving Bao Zheng at the Gold Dragon Monastery ===
Zhan Zhao sees a Taoist priest attempting suicide and saves him. The priest reveals that two lecherous monks have killed the old monk in the Gold Dragon Monastery, and are using the place to hide women they kidnap. The priest reported them, but the government took in bribes and physically punished the priest instead. Meanwhile, Bao Zheng and servant Bao Xing arrive at the monastery for overnight lodging. At night, Zhan climbs over the wall and discovers that the monks have locked the pair up with plans to murder them for money. Zhan helps them escape while he stays behind. A few hours later, Bao Zheng sees a huge fire from the direction of the monastery.

=== Saving Bao Zheng at Earth Dragon Crag ===
While passing through Earth Dragon Crag, Zhan Zhao is confronted by a bandit named Zhao Hu and defeats him quickly. Other bandits come to help and Zhan sees that his old friend Wang Chao is the leader. Wang invites Zhan to the crag where he rules with blood brothers Ma Han, Zhang Long and Zhao. Zhan discovers that they have two prisoners and recognizes them as Bao Zheng and Bao Xing whom he had saved once before. He asks the bandits to release them and after talking, suggests to the four that instead of remaining as bandits, they should help Bao Zheng serve the country. Eventually his suggestion is followed.

=== Unfoiling Bao Zheng's Assassination Plot ===
Near Chenzhou, Zhan Zhao sees a woman crying and learns that Marquis Pang Yu had kidnapped a beautiful woman Jin Yuxian. At night, Zhan climbs over the wall to Pang Yu's palace and discovers a plot by Pang and Governor Jiang Wan to assassinate Bao Zheng, on his way to Chenzhou to investigate Pang's wrongdoings. Zhan follows the assassin Xiang Fu and notifies Bao beforehand. At night, Xiang is spotted on the roof by Bao's vigilant entourage and when he tries to escape, Zhan shoots him down with an arrow. Using Zhan's tips, Bao also saves Jin and arrests Pang.

=== Engagement to Ding Yuehua ===
Zhan Zhao is invited by Ding Zhaohui to visit the Ding Family Village. There he tries sword dancing with a famous sword from the village, Zhanlu, and remarks that Zhanlu is much lighter than his own sword, Juque. Outraged, the younger cousin Ding Yuehua challenges Zhan to a duel as she is Zhanlu's owner. Zhan is very impressed with Ding Yuehua's skills and admits defeat when she cuts off his bandanna. However, Ding Zhaolan notices that Zhan has actually cut off Ding Yuehua's earring which is much more difficult. With the blessings of the entire Ding family, Zhan and Ding Yuehua exchange swords as engagement gifts.

=== Dueling with Bai Yutang ===
Zhan Zhao learns that Bai Yutang is in the capital looking to challenge him, as a result of him getting the nickname "Royal Cat" from Emperor Renzong. While Zhan talks about it in the Kaifeng court, Zhao Hu makes a comment that Bai is not to be feared. As soon as Zhao finishes the sentence, someone listening to the conversation outside throws something that breaks the wine cup Zhao has in hand. Zhan quickly goes outside and engages in a battle with this man in the night. Zhan is impressed with Bai's agility and feels his anger. He also gets serious and breaks Bai's sabre. Zhan pursues Bai, but Bai throws a stone, knocking off Zhan's bandanna and manages to escape.

=== Being Captured by Bai Yutang ===
Bai Yutang steals three treasures and leaves a note specifically challenging Zhan Zhao to follow him to Hollow Island. Jiang Ping and Gongsun Ce suggest that Zhan wait until Han Zhang is found. However, Zhan gets impatient and goes to Hollow Island by himself. The guards at Hollow Island would not open the gate and provoke him. Angry, Zhan climbs the wall at night and finds Bai's place well-lit. He goes inside, and after passing through a few rooms, steps on a spring-lock and falls in a trap. On the third day of his imprisonment he is saved by Ding Zhaohui and gets the three treasures back.

== Career ==
Zhan Zhao was the royal guard of the palace. He was later assigned to work together with Bao Zheng, a governor of Kaifeng city in the capital city of Northern Song. He was a very honest person who was good at martial arts. In his life, he was known for serving Bao even more than being a royal guard of the imperial court. Zhan Zhao was best known for his martial art skills. He was the body guard of Bao and the fourth ranking royal guard of the Song's Royal Palace. His title was "The Royal Cat" (御猫, yùmāo). He was the only man who was allowed to enter the Inner Palace armed. People said that he represented the Wu (martial) aspect while Bao Zheng represented the Wen (civil) aspect. He was also the leader of Bao Zheng's guards, namely Wang Chao (王朝), Ma Han (馬漢), Zhang Long (張龍) and Zhao Hu (趙虎).

Before Zhan Zhao became a royal guard, he travelled around the land. During his travels, he encountered "The Five Rats" who each had a special skill, specializing in water and others underground, and fought them. During his career, Zhan Zhao was once ordered to catch Bai Yutang who was the best and the youngest of the "Five Rats". Zhan Zhao went to their island to fight against them and was able to defeat all of them.

== Media Adaptations ==
=== Justice Bao (1993 TV Series) ===
One of the most well-known media adaptations of Zhan Zhao is the 1993, 236-episode Justice Bao television series. Zhan Zhao, played by Hong Kong actor Kenny Ho, is portrayed as a righteous, yet gentle and kind knight-errant who assists Bao Zheng, often taking on roles such as Bao's personal body guard, policeman, and detective.

Zhan Zhao's signature garments of the red robe is especially memorable for many, and is often repeated by other television adaptations following this one. It is also because of the red robe appearance that fans describe Kenny Ho's version of Zhan Zhao using these lines: "仗劍三尺，江湖之外，紅袍展仁心，青峰昭律義。", the sword that serves justice, the red robe that displays a kind heart," thus incorporating Zhan Zhao's name (展昭), his personalities, and appearance.

=== Justice Pao (1995 TV Series) ===
Following the popular 1993 TV series is this 80-episode series produced by Television Broadcast Limited. Zhan Zhao, played by Hong Kong actor Felix Wong, once again wears his signature red robe. This version of Zhan Zhao is similarly portrayed as the righteous and sympathetic paladin who aids Bao Zheng in his criminal cases.

=== Three Heroes and Five Gallants (2016 TV Series) ===
A new adaptation of Shi Yukun's The Seven Heroes and Five Gallants produced by Huayi Brothers and Tianxing Yiyuan Entertainment (天星亿源影视), with actor Yan Yikuan playing Zhan Zhao / Shen Zhongyuan. Zhan Zhao is again portrayed as a righteous and clever hero who takes on the persona of Shen Zhongyuan in order to spy on enemies of the people and to complete missions assigned to him by Bao Zheng. It also allows him to team together with the Five Rats.

=== Justice Bao (2025 TV series) ===
Produced by Channel 3 and Tencent Penguin Pictures. Zhan Zhao played by Thai actor Kanawut Traipipattanapong.

=== Zhan Zhao Adventures (2025 TV series) ===
Spin-off of Shi Yukun's The Seven Heroes and Five Gallants. Zhan Zhao portrayed by Yang Yang.
