= Lu Prefecture (Anhui) =

Historical administrative division in Anhui, China

- Traditional Chinese: 廬州
- Hanyu Pinyin: Lú Zhōu
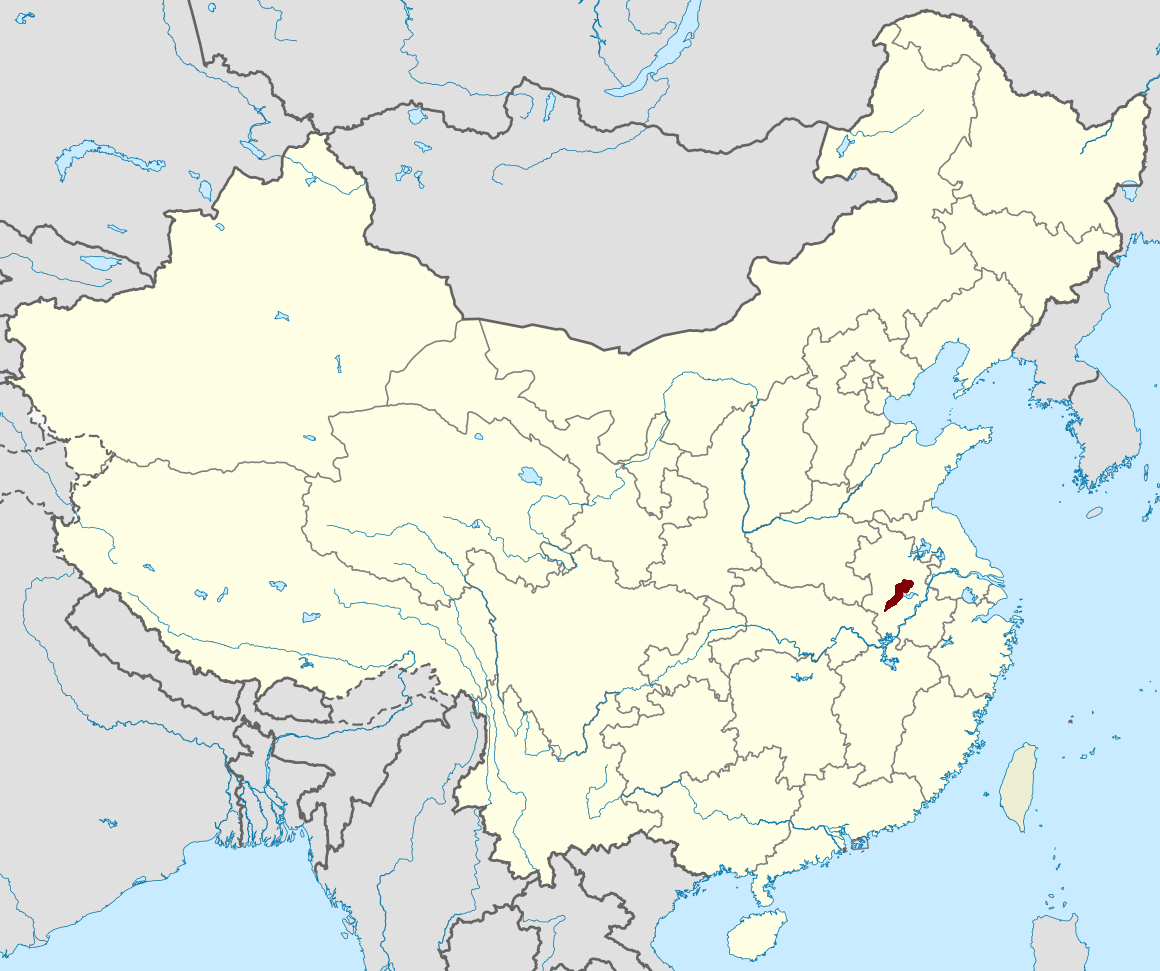
- Population
  - 740s or 750s: 205,396
  - 1100s: 178,359
- History
  - Preceded by: Lujiang Commandery
  - Created: 581 (Sui dynasty); 621 (Tang dynasty)
  - Abolished: 1277 (Yuan dynasty)
  - Succeeded by: Luzhou Route
- Contained within
  - Circuit: Huainan Circuit; Huainan West Circuit (1072–1277)

Luzhou or Lu Prefecture was a zhou (prefecture) in imperial China centering on modern Hefei, Anhui, China. It existed (intermittently) from 581 to 1277.

== Counties ==
Lu Prefecture administered the following counties (縣) through history:

#	Sui dynasty	Tang dynasty; Five Dynasties period	Song dynasty	Modern location
1	Hefei (合肥)			Hefei (City Proper)
2	Shen (慎)		Shen, 960–1162; Liang (梁), after 1162	Feidong County
3	Xiang'an (襄安)	Chao (巢)	administered by Wuwei Prefecture	Chaohu
4	Lujiang (廬江)		administered by Wuwei Prefecture	Lujiang County
5	Shucheng (舒城)			Shucheng County

During the Five Dynasties period, Lu Prefecture was administered by Wu from 907 to 937, by Southern Tang from 937 to 958, and by Later Zhou (who seized the prefecture from Southern Tang during the Southern Tang–Later Zhou War) from 958 to 960.
