= The Great Emperor in Song Dynasty =

- Promotional poster
- Traditional Chinese: 大宋傳奇之趙匡胤
- Simplified Chinese: 大宋传奇之赵匡胤
- Hanyu Pinyin: Dà Sòng Chuánqí zhī Zhào Kuāngyìn
- Written by: Yang Lijun
- Directed by: Gao Xixi
- Starring: Chen Jianbin; Yin Tao; Shao Feng; Wang Huichun; Tian Ling; Zhou Yang; Li Jianxin; Li Wenwen
- Ending theme: "Wangzhe Mo Wen Gui" (王者莫問歸) performed by Duo Liang
- Country of origin: China
- Original language: Mandarin
- No. of episodes: 48

Production
- Producer: Song Tong
- Running time: 45 minutes

Original release
- Network: Chongqing Television; Jilin Television

The Great Emperor in Song Dynasty is a 2015 Chinese historical TV series directed by Gao Xixi, starring Chen Jianbin as Emperor Taizu of Song (Zhao Kuangyin) who founded the Song dynasty and reunified most of China proper.

The series was filmed at the Hengdian World Studios in 2012 but was not broadcast until 2015.

== International broadcast ==
- China - 10 August 2015, Chongqing Television/Jilin Television
- Malaysia - 24 January 2016, Astro Quan Jia HD
- South Korea - 20 May 2016, AsiaUHD
- Taiwan - November 2016, Taiwan Television/Videoland Television

== Cast ==
- Chen Jianbin as Zhao Kuangyin
- Yin Tao as Wang Yuehong
  - Li Yiying as young Wang Yuehong
- Yin Tao also as Xu Rui
- Shao Feng as Zhao Kuangyi
  - Qiu Shuang as young Zhao Kuangyi
- Wang Huichun as Zhao Pu
- Tian Ling as Du Shenping
- Zhou Yang as Zhao Jingniang
- Li Jianxin as Wang Ji'en
- Li Wenwen as Fu Rong
- Kang Kai as Zhang Qiong
- Ji Chenmu as Fu Zhaoshou
- Cao Weiyu as Shen Yilun
- Wang Guan as He Shuya
- Sun Jia as Xue Fengjiao
- Li Jianyi as Chen Tuan
- Liu Yajin as Meng Chang
- Yan Pei as Wei Renpu
- Xu Maomao as Gao Huaide
- Lu Yong as Guo Wei
- Li Hongrui as Li Chongjin
- Cheng Xiangyin as Wang Rao
- Sun Ning as Tao Gu
- Song Laiyun as Han Tong
- Li Yuxuan as Han Gui
- Wang Dongming as Liu Chengyou
- Li Yansheng as Liu Wensou
- Ye Peng as Zheng En
- Bi Haifeng as Zhao Hongyin
- Lu Yujie as Fu Yanqing
- Huo Qing as Jia Yan
- Fan Ying as Lu Duoxun
- Wang Zitong as Song Huayang
  - Xu Yuan as young Song Huayang
- Gao Baosong as An Zhong
- Wang Ming as Yingying
- Zhang Jinyu as Wanqing
- Zuo Yidan as Bailing
- Liu Jing as Xiaodie
- Wang Tongyu as Liu Yao
- Fan Yulin as Chen Kai
- Zhang Xinhua as Cheng Dexuan
- Shang Yue as Niu Deshui
- Zhong Minghe as Su Fengji
- Xu Ge as Li Chongju
- Yang Guang as Li Yun
- Zhang Yaxi as Li Yu
- Li Yuemin as Lei Dexiang
- Ji Chonggong as Wei Rong
- Xu Wanqiu as Liu Chengyou's concubine
- An Ruiyun as Du Shenzhao
- Fan Guolun as Du Zhu
- Bai Jincheng as Doctor Fan
- Wu Xiaodong as Chai Rong
- Yang Sichen as Chai Zongxun
- Tian Yuqing as Fu Ming
- Guo Wenxue as Lü Yuqing
- Ma Zengqin as Lady He
- Yang Kaiwen as An Yougui
- Liu Yuchen as Zhao Dezhao
  - Huang Yujialin as young Zhao Dezhao
- Zhang Yuzhu as elderly clansman
- Hu Jingpei as Ge Ba
- Cao Yuqing as Ge Ba's mother
- Tang Qirong as Doctor Hong
- Wang Hui as Huilin
- Yang Zhe as Zhang Yongde
- Jia Jungang as Li Hao
- Li Yufu as Lin Renzhao
- Yu Kuai as Li Jixun
- Zou Dongxiao as Liu Jiyuan
- Cheng Yuxuan as Liu Chongjun
- Dai Ming as Shi Hongzhao
- Yang Shu as Li Shouzhen
- Luo Ting as Yang Bin
- Guo Junke as Meng Xuanzhe
- Qiu Yunhe as Liu Chang
- Yin Xiaotian as Li Cunxu (cameo)
- Yu Conghai as Li Siyuan (cameo)
- Zhang Chenghao as Emperor Jingzong of Liao
