= How Much Sorrow Do You Have =

- DVD cover
- Also known as: The Real Warrior; Li Hou Zhu and Zhao Kuangyin; Love for the Country and the Beautiful Woman
- Traditional Chinese: 問君能有幾多愁
- Simplified Chinese: 问君能有几多愁
- Hanyu Pinyin: Wèn Jūn Néng Yǒu Jǐ Duō Chóu
- Genre: historical fiction
- Starring: Nicky Wu; Liu Tao; Howie Huang; Wu Yue; Pan Hong; Xiong Naijin; Serina Liu
- Country of origin: China
- Original language: Mandarin
- No. of episodes: 40

Production
- Running time: 45 minutes
- Production company: Beijing HualuBaina Film & TV

How Much Sorrow Do You Have, also known as The Real Warrior in some countries, is a 2005 Chinese historical drama produced by Beijing HualuBaina Film & TV Co. It was first broadcast on China Television in Taiwan in August 2005. In mainland China it was first broadcast on CCTV-8 in 2006. The title is directly taken from a poem by Li Yu, the protagonist of the drama.

Essentially a soap opera, many relationships are fictionalized, but recorded historical events including the Conquest of Southern Tang by Song are followed relatively faithfully. Over 60 historical characters appear in this series, including 9 monarchs of 5 different states (Later Han, Later Zhou, Later Shu, Song dynasty and Southern Tang).

== Plot ==
Set in the 10th century, the story revolves around two monarchs: Zhao Kuangyin, the first ruler of the Song dynasty, and Li Yu, the last ruler of the Southern Tang dynasty. It is the third TV series focusing on the complex friend-foe relationship between these two historical characters (though in history no such relationship exists), after the 1986 Singaporean series The Sword and the Song and the 1996 Taiwanese series Love, Sword, Mountain & River, but the plot-lines differ somewhat.

Li Yu and Zhao Kuangyin were two emperors during the Five Dynasties and Ten Kingdoms period. Li Yu was kind and respectful, while Zhao Kuangyin was rough and ambitious. They had different backgrounds and attitudes towards life, resulting in two drastically different futures.

Zhao Kuangyin and Zhou Ehuang fell in love at first sight and they planned to visit Southern Tang together. They met Li Yu, and they formed an unlikely friendship. However because of fate, Zhou Ehuang ultimately married Li Yu and she became the Queen.

The marriage between Zhou Ehuang and Li Yu deteriorated when Li Yu also had an affair with Zhou Ehuang's sister, Zhou Jiamin, who later became Queen Zhou the Younger and their second son died at the age of three. Zhou Ehuang soon died from sorrow. Zhao Kuangyin was angered by her death, and wanted to wage war against Southern Tang.

After Zhao Kuangyin conquered Southern Tang and the other kingdoms, he spared Li Yu and his family. He also unexpectedly met Madame Huarui, who looked exactly like Zhou Ehuang.

== Cast ==
- Nicky Wu as Li Yu
- Liu Tao as Zhou Ehuang
  - Liu Tao also as Madame Huarui
- Howie Huang as Zhao Kuangyin
- Wu Yue as Zhao Kuangyi
- Pan Hong as Empress Zhong
- Xiong Naijin as Zhou Jiamin, Queen Zhou the Younger
- Serina Liu as Yaoniang
- Wang Hui as Zhao Pu
- Chunyu Shanshan as Pei Houde
- Yi Zhaobo as Jiang Zheng
- Ye Xinyu as Li Hongji
- Zhang Shuai as Li Congshan
- Wu Lanhui as Li Jing
- Shen Meng-sheng as Zhao Hongyin
- He Zhonghua as Meng Chang
- Chen Zhihui as Shi Shouxin
- Shi Ke as Qing'er
- Wang Xinmin as Zhang Dejun
- Yuan Min as Lin Renzhao
- Chen Dacheng as Zhou Zong
- Liu Jie as Zhou Zong's wife
- Cai Jing as Sapo
- Jin Demao as Han Xizai
- Chen Weiguo as Chen Qiao
- Zhu Yikun as Fan Ruoshui
- Gao Yuqing as Xu You
- Liu Jiang as Feng Yansi
- Sui Shuyang as Feng Yanlu
- Li Fei as Chai Rong
- Mo Meilin as Wang Yansheng
- Chen Hai as Pan You
- Xu Ming as Zhong Mo
- Zhang Lei as Li Jingsui
- Chen Bin as Sun Sheng
- Wu Hongwu as Cao Bin
- Shen Xiaoyan as Li Yanniang
- Jia Hong as Han Tong
- Li Meng as Gao Huaide
- Zhang Liang as Murong Yanzhao
- Zuo Baixue as Tao Gu
- Zhong Xinpei as Yan Xu
- Zou Na as Palace-Maid Huang
- Zhao Gang as Guo Wei
- Shi Lei as Guo Chong
- Cai Gang as Fan Zhi
- Zhu Mingming as Miao Xun
- Shi Yajun as Empress Dowager Li
- Tang Yajun as Chu Zhaofu
- Zhyang Han as Wang Shenqi
- Zhou Kai as Kang Sheng
- Yin Xinhao as Liu Chengyou
- Cao Shiping as Wang Pu
- Ju Bo as Pan Mei
- Peng Zhenzhong as Shi Yande
- Zhan Lei as Li Chuyun
- Miao Liang as Han Chongyun
- Zhou Tingchao as Wang Quanbin
- Qian Minghua as Liu Guangyi
- Yan Pei as Chang Sheng
- Yue Ranting as Bi Zhu
- Hu Rong as Xiaoyu
- Wang Luoting as Xiao Yan
- Jia Shijun as Zha Wenhui
- Guo Qiming as Fan Xijiang
- Xu Jiawei as Guo Zongxun
- Duan Jing as Empress Dowager Fu
- Lu Wenzhong as Chen Jue
- Ding Jianguo as Li Deming
- Lu Zhong as Wang Chongzhi
- Zhong Hanhao as Chang Mengxi
- Song Jianhua as Bian Hao
- Li Fan as Yuan Congfan
- Sui Shuyang as Wang Zhaoyuan
- Rao Min as Empress Wang
- Tang Yifan as Li Zhongxuan
- Ji Tianfu as Li Zhongyu
- Zhang Chaoli as Fu Gui
