= Chenqiao mutiny =

960 coup that began the Song dynasty in China

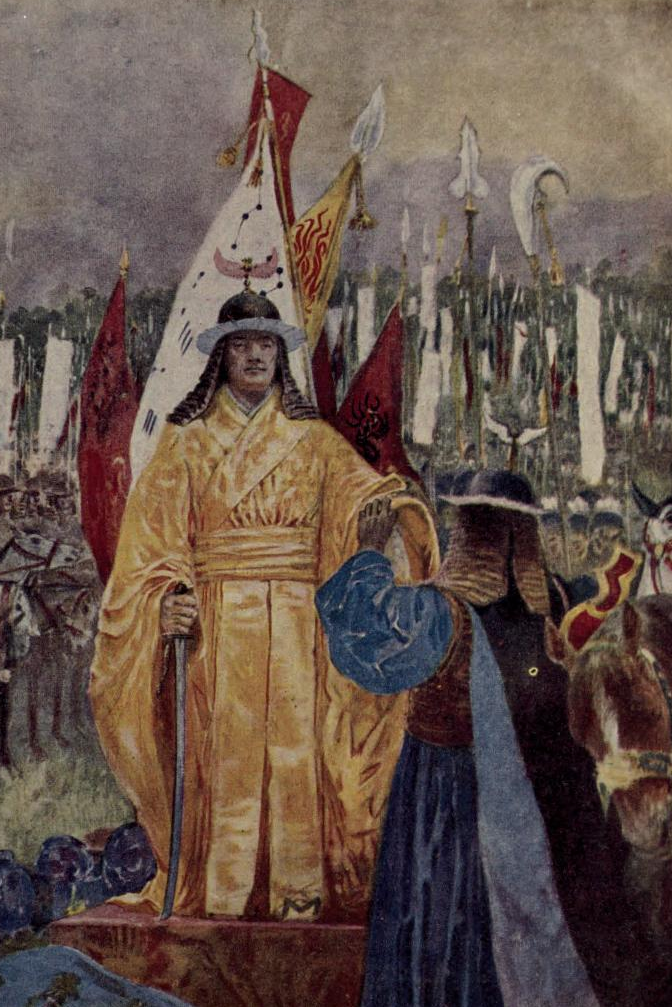
- A 1915 interpretation of the Chenqiao mutiny. Zhao Kuangyin is visible in yellow robes, the symbol of emperorship.
Date	2 February 960 (Note: According to the Gregorian calendar.)
Location	Chenqiao, Fengqiu County, Henan, China
Result	Successful coup d'état by Zhao Kuangyin: Overthrow of the Later Zhou dynasty; Foundation of the Song dynasty; Consolidation of military authority under Zhao

Chinese name
- Traditional Chinese: 陳橋兵變
- Simplified Chinese: 陈桥兵变
Transcriptions
Standard Mandarin
- Hanyu Pinyin: Chénqiáo bīngbiàn
- Wade–Giles: ch'en-ch'iao ping pian

The Chenqiao mutiny was a mutiny and coup d'état on 2 February 960 during the Five Dynasties and Ten Kingdoms Period of China that resulted in the overthrow of the Later Zhou dynasty and the foundation of the Song dynasty. In response to an invasion by the Northern Han and Liao dynasty, general Zhao Kuangyin led his troops to Chenqiao. His troops soon mutinied and installed him as emperor. (Note: Zhao Kuangyin was posthumously honoured as Emperor Taizu of Song.) Although the official narrative recounts that a yellow imperial robe was forced upon Zhao and that he only accepted the emperorship reluctantly, most modern historians now agree that he helped orchestrate the mutiny. Many apocryphal events, such as a solar eclipse and a previous emperor's discovery of a mysterious wooden tablet, also surround the Chenqiao mutiny, decreasing the inherent illegitimacy of usurpation.

Prior to the foundation of the Song dynasty, China had experienced a period of disunity in the aftermath of Huang Chao's rebellion and during the Five Dynasties and Ten Kingdoms period. Military-backed rebellions and usurpations were especially common during this period. The largely bloodless Chenqiao mutiny therefore empowered Zhao to not only maintain the personal loyalty of the Song military, but also to institute centralization reforms that effectively prevented internal military threats from occurring in the future. This stability allowed Zhao and his younger brother, Emperor Taizong, to largely reunify China in 979 following the conquest of the Northern Han.

== Background ==
Following the end of the An Lushan rebellion in the mid-700s, the Tang dynasty largely delegated its regional authority to the Jiedushi, or military governors. The government was further weakened by Huang Chao's rebellion in the late 800s, which destroyed the Tang court's ability to appoint regional governors; the warlords that filled the regional power vacuum would go on to found the Five Dynasties and Ten kingdoms. The Five Dynasties, the first of which was founded following Zhu Wen's usurpation of the throne from Emperor Ai of Tang in 907, ruled over northern China in quick succession, each supplanting the other via usurpation, war, and other violent means.

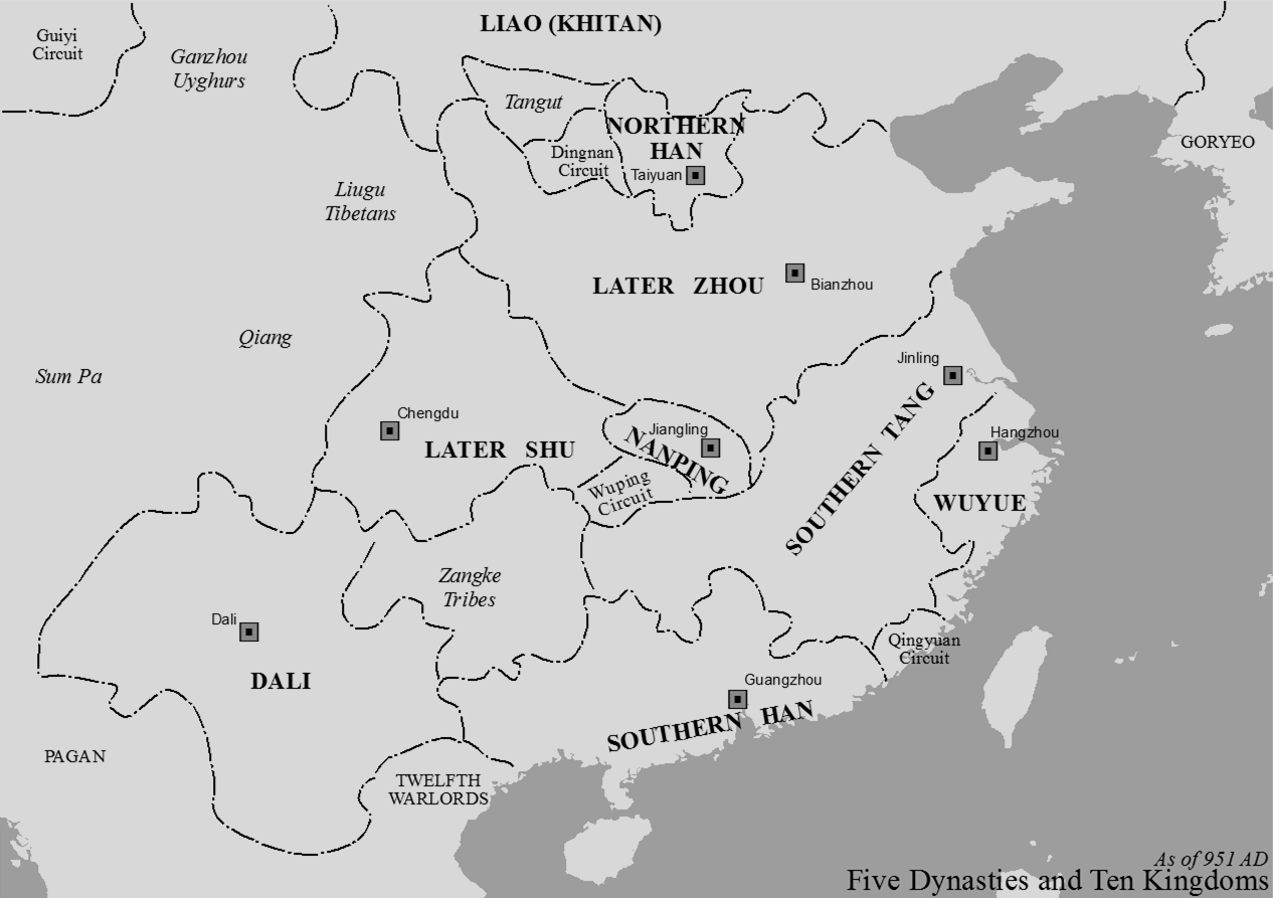
The Later Zhou dynasty upon its foundation in 951. Bianzhou, the capital, is an alternative name for Kaifeng.

The southern Ten Kingdoms were generally wealthier than the northern Five Dynasties. However, the Later Zhou, founded in 951 and the last of the Five Dynasties, did lay a "limited foundation of wealth" under the emperors Guo Wei and Chai Rong. Guo and Chai wore down the power of the regional military governors strengthened the bureaucracy, centralized the military, and initiated serious plans to reunify China. Chai in particular oversaw the conquest of significant territories from the Later Shu, Southern Tang (during the Later Zhou conquest of Huainan), and Liao dynasty respectively. These administrative and military successes made Chai more legitimate than any emperor of the previous dynasties and enabled northern China to recover economically. Nonetheless, the Later Zhou's authority was not strong enough to sustain a child as emperor.

Facilitating the military success of the Later Zhou was Zhao Kuangyin, a talented general who would later become the subject of the Chenqiao mutiny. His father, Zhao Hongyin, was himself a general. Zhao Kuangyin joined the regional army of Guo Wei when he was 21 and helped the latter stage a successful coup against the Later Han. Zhao quickly rose through the ranks and endeared himself to Chai Rong by distinguishing himself in campaigns against the Later Shu and Southern Tang. His promotion to inspector-general of the Palace Command (one of the Later Zhou's armies, the other being the Metropolitan Command) gave him the means to cultivate his troops’ personal loyalty. Zhao was therefore in a prime position to usurp the throne following the death of Chai Rong.

== Events leading to the mutiny ==
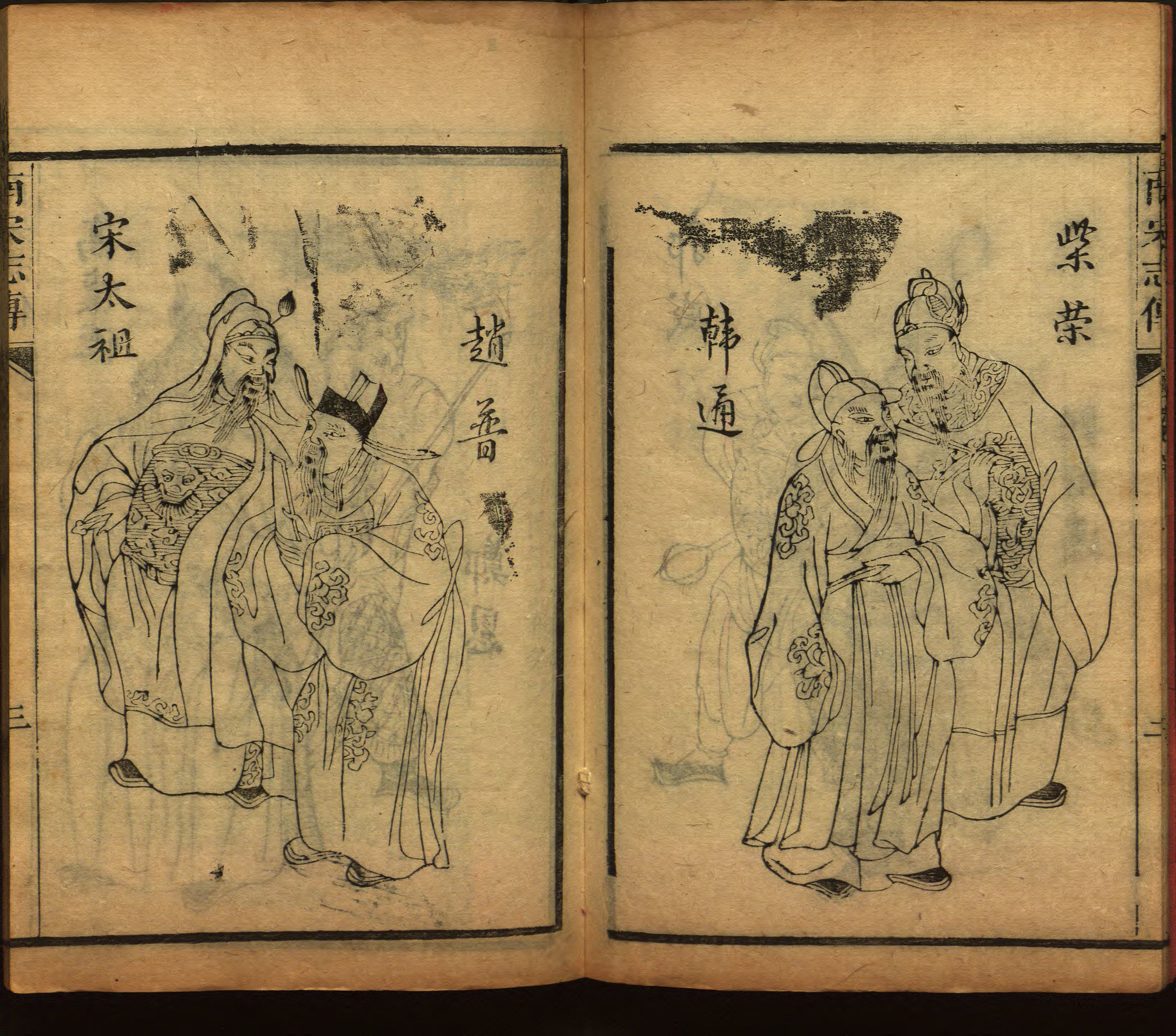
Important figures related to the mutiny depicted on a Qing-era book. From left to right: Zhao Kuangyin, his advisor Zhao Pu, the Later Zhou commander Han Tong, and the previous emperor Chai Rong.

The Later Zhou emperor Chai Rong died of illness in 959 and was succeeded by his five-year-old son, Guo Zongxun. Possibly capitalizing on their rival's preoccupation with succession, a joint Liao-Northern Han invasion was launched against the Later Zhou in early 960. Many officials, including inspector-general Han Tong's son, were concerned about Zhao's growing influence. Despite these officials’ warnings against further empowering Zhao, he was still sent to lead an army to counter the northern invasion, after the Later Zhou court consulted its chancellors, Fan Zhi and Wang Pu.

After marching his troops out of the capital, Kaifeng, and crossing the Yellow River on 1 February, Zhao Kuangyin allowed his troops to rest at Chenqiao, a village 20 miles northeast of Kaifeng. He ordered his troops to camp on a piece of flatland near in front of the village's courier station, tied his horse to a pagoda tree, and entered a nearby house to drink some wine before falling asleep. That night, Zhao's officers agreed that he would properly reward them for service if he were emperor. The officers then consulted Zhao Kuangyi, Zhao Kuangyin's younger brother, and Zhao Pu, Kuangyin's advisor, about the plan. Both men supported the usurpation and Kuangyi added that, to remain popular, the generals should "discipline the officers and men under [themselves] and strictly prohibit them from looting". Kuangyi then informed two of Kuangyin's loyal generals in Kaifeng about the imminent coup.

=== Later additions ===
Retrospective propaganda detailed many legitimizing portents that supposedly precipitated the Chenqiao mutiny. The Yuhu Qinghua (玉壺清話), completed in 1078; the Xu Zizhi Tongjian Changbian, published in 1183; and the History of Song, published in 1346, all claim that an astrologer, Miao Xun, saw the sun being eclipsed by another sun. The Yuhu further states that the new sun appeared above the regular one, implying that a new emperor would replace the old one.

Also mentioned in the Yuhu Qinghua is Han Xizai, a Southern Tang envoy sent to the Later Zhou court to congratulate Chai Rong on his succession. Upon his return, Han said little about Chai but heaped praise upon Zhao Kuangyin. Han had a history of accurately predicting the future, so his praise made Zhao seem even more remarkable.

The History of Song claims that Chai Rong was reading his book collection after a northern campaign when he found a wooden plaque that said "The inspector-general is to be emperor". The annoyed Chai thus replaced the previous inspector-general of the Palace Command with Zhao Kuangyin.

The Sushui Jiwen, completed in the late 1000s, and the Dongdu Shilüe, published in 1186, both mention a rumor that circulated in the capital: Zhao's troops would mutiny because a child emperor under the regency of Empress Dowager Fu would not recognize the troops' services. In anticipation of this rumor's fruition, citizens fled the capital, Kaifeng, en masse.

== Mutiny ==
Zhao Kuangyin was declared emperor by his troops on the dawn of 2 February 960. According to the History of Song, Zhao's armor-clad officers stormed his bedroom and said: "Now we do not have a master. We will make you Emperor!" Surprised, Zhao jumped out of his bed only to be forcibly draped in an imperial yellow gown. The officers helped the reluctant Zhao onto his horse and the army marched south to Kaifeng. On the way, Zhao threatened to refuse the throne if the mutineers did not pledge absolute loyalty to him and he vowed to execute those who "dared to loot the capital or to molest its inhabitants". Those who obeyed would be awarded handsomely.

Although this version of the mutiny is the most commonly accepted version amongst traditional historians, the yellow gown was likely a later addition. Other sources, such as the Xu Zizhi Tongjian Changban and the Dongdu Shilüe, add that Zhao was intoxicated and reluctant to support the mutineers.

== Aftermath ==
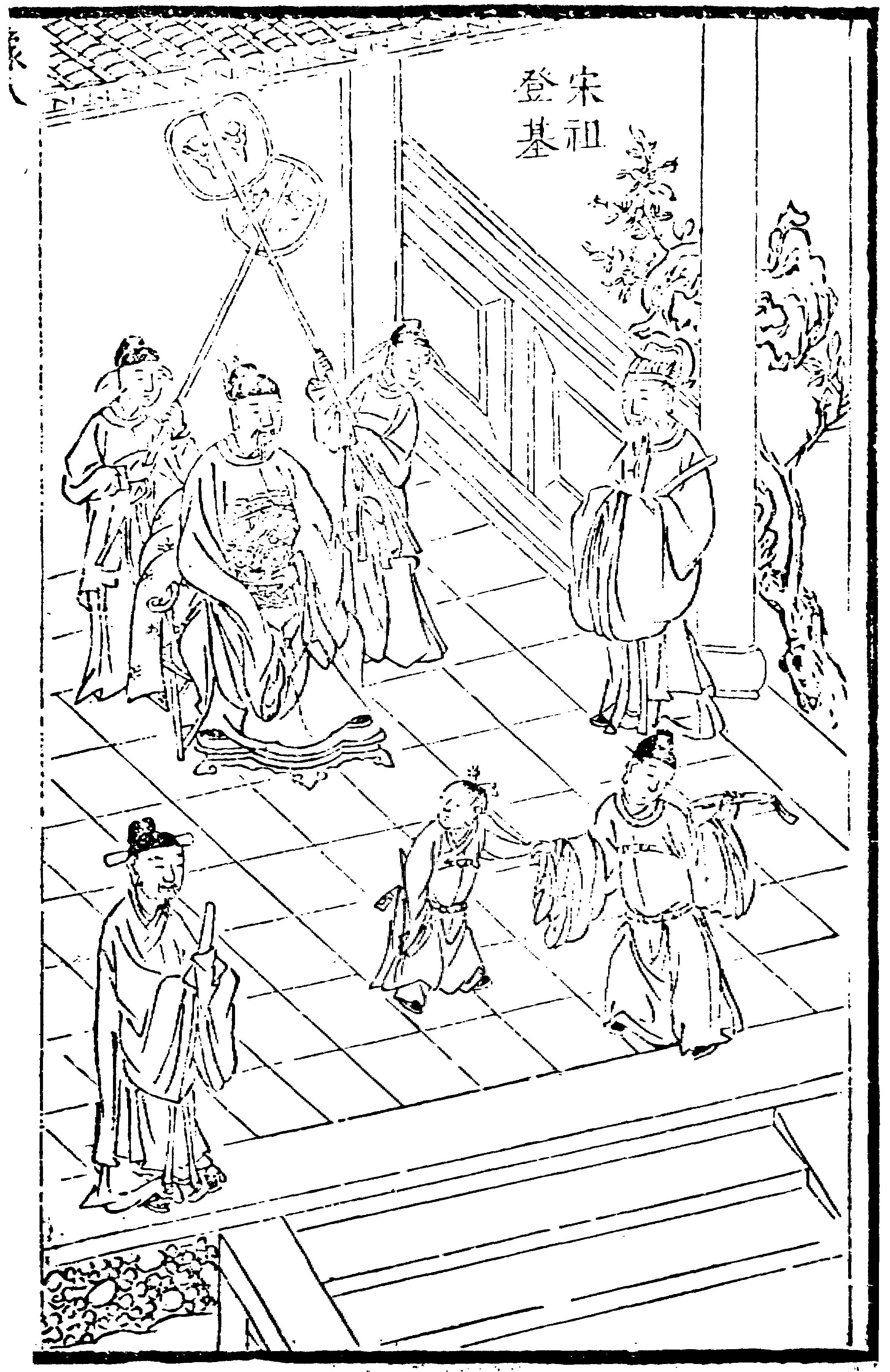
A Qing-era depiction of the enthroned Zhao Kuangyin sending Guo Zongxun, the former child emperor, into exile

According to the History of Song, Zhao Kuangyin marched his troops into Kaifeng the following day. Fan Zhi was so distressed that, upon receiving the news after attending court in the morning, he squeezed Wang Pu's hand until it bled. Han Tong, the only serious opposition to Zhao's usurpation, was killed by a commander loyal to Zhao, and the child emperor Guo Zongxun was exiled after an organized abdication. While sitting in his office, Zhao cried to Fan Zhi and Wang Pu that he had been forced to take the throne. After a commander threatened them with a sword, Fan and Wang realized the theatre of the situation and kowtowed. Zhao then received the congratulations of the other officials, proclaimed the Song dynasty, and rewarded his supporters. However, Zhao's mother, Empress Dowager Du, was unhappy. When questioned about this by her son, she said that it was impossible to become an ordinary man again if the emperorship was lost. Zhao bowed and vowed to always remember her teachings.

The succession, which was so peaceful that street markets continued to trade, represented a significant break from the violent transitions of the previous Five Dynasties. Zhao's popularity was preserved and the Song dynasty was strong enough to resume the unification of China. Zhao nonetheless compensated for the inherent illegitimacy of usurpation by claiming the Mandate of Heaven; this was established via auspicious signs of Heaven's approval. To appear confident in his legitimacy, Zhao laughed off warnings that a newly enthroned emperor should not personally inspect society because Heaven would protect him.

Several powerful individuals opposed the Chenqiao mutiny, namely Guo Chong, Yuan Yan, Li Yun, and Li Chongjin. Guo and Yuan, who had helped establish the Later Zhou, would eventually submit to Song authority. Li Yun, the military governor of Luzhou (in modern-day Shanxi), sought an alliance with the Northern Han, but his rebellion was defeated by Song forces in under two months. Li Chongjin, the former inspector-general of the Metropolitan Command and the governor of Yangzhou (in modern-day Jiangsu), tried to rebel alongside Li Yun; however, his envoy defected to the Song and he too was defeated in under two months. These military successes, along with further structural reforms to the military dampened any remaining dissent amongst Zhao's generals.

According to the Sushui Jiwen, Zhao complained to his top generals at a drinking party in mid-971 that an incident similar to the Chenqiao mutiny could be committed against him. He pointed out that wealth, prestige, and prosperous descendants were the essence of happiness and persuaded his generals (some of whom had assisted in the mutiny) to give up their posts in exchange for appointment as regional military governors. Each general who resigned had his clan married into the royal family and lived the rest of their lives in comfortable retirement. This incident further increased Zhao's control over the military. The powerful clans that resulted from these royal marriages would continue to supply empresses for Song emperors and would act as aristocratic counterparts to the imperial examination-selected literati.

The Song dynasty under Zhao Kuangyin would conquer Jingnan, Ma Chu, Later Shu, Southern Han, and Southern Tang, in that order. Kuangyin's brother and successor, Kuangyi, would conquer Wuyue, Qingyuan Circuit, and, in 979, Northern Han, thereby ending the Five Dynasties and Ten Kingdoms period. However, he failed to conquer the Sixteen Prefectures from the Liao dynasty. Kuangyi would continue his predecessor's centralizing reforms and transform the Song dynasty into a state dominated by the literati, rather than by military generals.

== Assessment ==
=== Traditional interpretations ===
The account of the mutiny in the Old History of the Five Dynasties, published in 974, was officially endorsed by the Song dynasty since its compilation was ordered by Zhao Kuangyin. It places the responsibility of the mutiny on Zhao's officers but does not mention his drunkenness, the yellow robe, or the legitimizing portents, leaving much room for later embellishment.

Ouyang Xiu, author of the Historical Records of the Five Dynasties (published in 1073), stressed that the last emperor of the Later Zhou "relinquished" the throne to Zhao Kuangyin; translator Richard L. Davis notes that this implies "obedience" to the Mandate of Heaven, likely to legitimize Zhao's usurpation of the throne. Ouyang's description of the mutiny is otherwise extremely short. Although this may have been done to avoid scrutiny, the Historical Records were never intended for publication.

All traditional interpretations agree that Zhao Kuangyin was unwillingly installed as emperor. They state that he was merely a victim of circumstance, whether heavenly or man-made, and they generally approve of his decision to usurp the throne.

=== Modern interpretations ===
Most modern historians (such as Deng Guangming, Chen Dengyuan, and Wang Boqin) agree that Zhao Kuangyin, Zhao Kuangyi, and some key advisors engineered the Chenqiao mutiny. Thomas Bartlett corroborates this interpretation and further argues that Zhao was motivated by the need for competent leadership against an imminent invasion. Regardless of his actual willingness to take the throne, Zhao Kuangyin quickly took control of the situation after being declared emperor.

Johannes Kurz notes the accidental nature of the Chenqiao mutiny: The presence of a child emperor made it easy for strongmen outside of the royal family to contend for the throne, while a joint Liao-Northern Han invasion empowered a mutinous general to leave the capital with elite troops.

In The Cambridge History of China, Lau Nap-Yin and Huang Kuan-Ch’ung argue that the northern invasion may not have occurred at all. The Liao dynasty had recently been defeated by Chai Rong and may have wanted to recover the lands it had lost while the Later Zhou was preoccupied with succession.

=== Legacy ===
In the Cambridge History of China, John W. Chaffee says that there was little to indicate that “[Song] dynasty would be anything more than the sixth of the short-lived dynasties that had ruled north China for a half-century.” Yet, the political and military structures that Zhao and his successor created successfully ensured the longevity and internal peace of their dynasty. For example, future Song emperors would personally control major aspects of military and fiscal policy; while provided legitimacy and stability for the new dynasty.

== See also ==
- History of the Song dynasty
- Military history of the Song dynasty
