= The Sword and the Song =

- Also known as: Sword and the Song
- Traditional Chinese: 絕代雙雄
- Simplified Chinese: 绝代双雄
- Hanyu Pinyin: Jué Dài Shuāng Xióng
- Starring: Lin Mingzhe; Li Wenhai; Chen Xiuhuan; Chen Tianwen; Zheng Wanling; Liu Qiulian
- Opening theme: 《绝代双雄》 by Shiao Lih-ju
- Ending theme: 《山河泪》,《回首尘缘》,《独上西楼》 by Shiao Lih-ju
- Composers: Lee Shih Shiong; Lee Wei Shiong
- Country of origin: Singapore
- Original language: Mandarin
- No. of episodes: 40

Production
- Running time: 45 minutes

Original release
- Network: Singapore Broadcasting Corporation
- Release: 8 December 1986 – 6 February 1987

The Sword and the Song is a 1986 Singaporean historical series produced by Singapore Broadcasting Corporation. The drama focuses on a pair of great monarchs during the 10th century: Song dynasty's fearless and heroic warrior Zhao Kuangyin and Southern Tang's compassionate and sentimental poet-artist Li Yu, and how their vastly different personalities sealed the fates of their respective countries. The stories about Zhao Kuangyin are to some extent based on Wu Xuan's 1768 Chinese novel Fei Long Quan Zhuan (飛龍全傳).

Two subsequent TV series, the 1996 Taiwanese drama Love, Sword, Mountain & River and the 2005 Chinese drama How Much Sorrow Do You Have feature virtually the same main characters, though the plots differ somewhat.

== Cast and characters ==
=== Northern China (Later Han, Later Zhou, Song dynasty) ===
- Lin Mingzhe as Zhao Kuangyin
- Chen Tianwen as Zhao Kuangyi, Zhao Kuangyin's younger brother
- Chen Tianxiang as Zhao Hongyin, Zhao Kuangyi's father
- Chen Juanjuan as Du Siniang, Zhao Kuangyi's mother
- Liu Qianyi as Liu Chengyou, Later Han's emperor
- Hu Shuzhen as He Jinchan
- Yan Bingliang as Han Tong
- Guo Chongyi as Han Wei, Han Tong's son
- Gu Rongfang as Guo Wei
- Tang Wentao as Chai Rong
- Hong Peixing as Shi Shouxin
- Lin Jinchi as Wei Yixiao
- An Zheming as Zhao Pu
- Ye Shipin as Zheng En
- Hong Huifang as Tao Sanchun

=== Southern China (Southern Tang, Chu) ===
- Li Wenhai as Li Yu
- Zheng Wanling as Zhou Huimin (NvYing)
- Wu Weiqiang as Li Jing, Li Yu's father and Southern Tang's emperor
- Zhu Yuye as Empress Zhong, Li Yu's mother
- Chen Xiuhuan as Zhou Ehuang
- Yang Junhe as Li Jingsui, Li Yu's uncle
- Huang Shinan as Li Hongji, Li Yu's older brother
- Jin Jugong as Li Congshan, Li Yu's younger brother
- Liu Qiulian as Huang Feng
  - Michelle Chia as Huang Feng (child)
- Fu Shuiyu as Liuzhu
- Zeng Yaofeng as Huangfu Jixun
