= Shen Lun =

Shen Lun (沈倫); Shen Yilun (沈義倫)
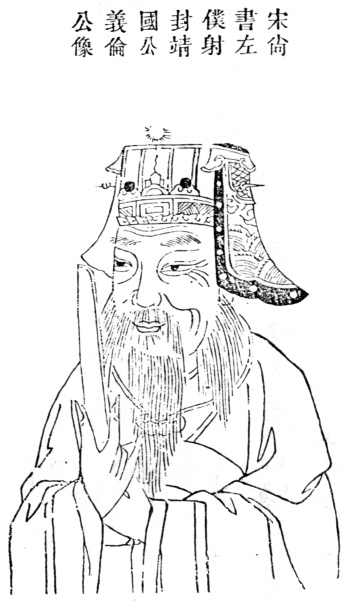
- from a Qing dynasty genealogy book

Grand councilor of the Song dynasty
- In office October 17, 973 – May 14, 982 Serving with Xue Juzheng, Lu Duoxun, Zhao Pu
- Monarchs: Emperor Taizu, Emperor Taizong

Personal details
- Born: c. 909; Taikang County, Kaifeng, Later Liang
- Died: November 16, 987 (aged 77–78); Kaifeng, Song Empire
- Spouses: Lady Yan (閻); Lady Tian (田)
- Children: Shen Jizong (沈繼宗), son

Shen Lun
- Traditional Chinese: 沈倫
- Simplified Chinese: 沈伦
Transcriptions
Standard Mandarin
- Hanyu Pinyin: Shěn Lún

Shen Yilun
- Traditional Chinese: 沈義倫
- Simplified Chinese: 沈义伦
Transcriptions
Standard Mandarin
- Hanyu Pinyin: Shěn Yìlún

Shen Shunyi
- Traditional Chinese: 沈順儀
- Simplified Chinese: 沈顺仪
Transcriptions
Standard Mandarin
- Hanyu Pinyin: Shěn Shùnyí

Shen Lun (c. 909 – 16 November 987, courtesy name Shunyi), known as Shen Yilun before 976, was a scholar-official who successively served the Later Han, Later Zhou and Song dynasties. He was one of the Song dynasty grand councilors between 973 and 982.

Emperor Zhenzong's Consort Shen was his granddaughter.

== During the Five Dynasties ==
Early in his career, Shen Yilun studied the "Three Rites" (Rites of Zhou, Book of Rites, and Etiquette and Ceremonial) and taught these classics between Luoyang and Sōng Prefecture to support himself. During Later Han, he joined the staff of Bai Wenke (白文珂), the prefect of Shǎn Prefecture.

In 954 during the Later Zhou, Shen Yilun was referred by a friend and became a retainer to general Zhao Kuangyin, then a military governor administering Hua Prefecture, Xǔ Prefecture, and Sòng Prefecture. Shen was able to manage the finances of all 3 prefectures, and had an incorruptible reputation.

== During the Song dynasty ==
In February 960, Zhao Kuangyin usurped the Later Zhou throne and founded the Song dynasty. At that time, Shen Yilun was a mere surveillance circuit judge stationed in Sòng Prefecture, but now that his former boss had become the emperor, he was summoned to the capital (and his hometown) Kaifeng and made director of the Census Bureau.

In early 962, returning from a diplomatic trip to Song's tributary state Wuyue, Shen offered more than 10 recommendations to the new emperor, all of which were accepted. One of recommendations was loaning out grain from military granaries to relieve the mass starvation Shen witnessed in Si and Yang Prefectures. Shen argued that peasants would repay the loan come harvest time in the autumn. However, another minister soon objected:

"If starvation continues, where would the repayment come from? And who would be accountable for that?"

To which Shen responded:

"A nation should govern humanely. This will automatically ensure peace, prosperity and a ripe harvest."

Zhao Kuangyin was pleased with the reply and ordered government officials in Huainan Circuit to dispense grain to starved people.

In 962, Shen was made a supervising secretary. The following spring he was made fiscal commissioner of Shaanxi Circuit. When the Song dynasty invaded the Later Shu in 964, Shen was in charge of the military finances.

== Notes and references ==
- (in Chinese) Toqto'a; et al., eds. (1345). Song Shi (宋史) [History of Song].
- (in Chinese) Li Tao (1183). Xu Zizhi Tongjian Changbian (續資治通鑑長編) [Extended Continuation to Zizhi Tongjian].
