= Liu Chen =

Liu Chen may refer to:

- Liu Chen (Shu Han) (died 263), Chinese prince of Shu Han
- Liu Chen (physicist) (born 1946), American physicist
- Liu Chen (magician) (born 1976), Taiwanese magician
- Serena Liu (1975–2020), or Liu Chen, Taiwanese dancer

== See also ==
- Liu Zhen (disambiguation)
