= Emperor Zhaowu =

Emperor Zhaowu may refer to:

== Posthumous name ==
- Liu Cong (Han-Zhao) (died 318), emperor of Han-Zhao
- Murong Sheng (373–401), emperor of Later Yan
- Shi Siming (703–761), emperor of Yan
- Zhao Hongyin (899–956), father of Emperor Taizu and Emperor Taizong of Song

== Era name ==
- Wu Sangui (1678–1678), emperor of Zhou
