= Empress Dowager Du =

Lady Du
- Empress Dowager Zhaoxian
- Palace portrait on a Hanging scroll, kept in National Palace Museum, Taipei, Taiwan

Empress dowager of the Song dynasty
- Tenure: 4 February 960 – 17 July 961
- Emperor: Zhao Kuangyin (Emperor Taizu) (son)
- Born: 902 or January 903; Dingzhou, Hebei, China
- Died: 17 July 961 (aged 58–59); Kaifeng, Henan, China
- Burial: An Mausoleum (安陵, in present-day Gongyi, Henan)
- Spouse: Zhao Hongyin
- Issue 3 others died young: Zhao Kuangyin, son; Zhao Guangyi, son; Daughter (m. Mi Fude, later m. Gao Huaide); Zhao Tingmei, son (maternity disputed)
Names
- Surname: Dù (杜); Given name: unknown
Posthumous name
- 961: Empress Dowager Míngxiàn (明憲太后); 964: Empress Dowager Zhāoxiàn (昭憲太后)
- House: Zhao (by marriage)
- Father: Du Shuang (杜爽)
- Mother: Lady Fan (范氏)

Empress Dowager Du (杜太后, given name unknown, c. 902 – 17 July 961) was an empress dowager of imperial China's Song dynasty. She was the wife of general Zhao Hongyin and the mother of Emperor Taizu of Song, who founded the Song dynasty.

After her death, another son, Emperor Taizong, succeeded Emperor Taizu, claiming legitimacy on grounds of their mother's will, alleged to be sealed in a golden shelf at her death. Many historians believe that this was actually a fabrication by Emperor Taizong.

== Becoming the empress dowager ==
In 960, her eldest surviving son Zhao Kuangyin staged a coup d'état to end the Later Zhou, forcing the 7-year-old Emperor Gong of Later Zhou to abdicate power and declaring himself the emperor of the new Song dynasty. Upon hearing the news, Lady Du was not surprised and merely stated: "My son has always been ambitious." She was honored as the empress dowager in a grand ceremony before all ministers but did not appear happy. When asked why, she replied: "I heard it is very difficult to be a ruler. Being above all commoners, if an emperor governs according to the ethics, then he deserves all their respect. However, if he mismanages the sovereign, he can no longer be a commoner even if he begs. This is why I am worried." Emperor Taizu bowed and promised to remember that.

== Promise of the Golden Shelf ==
Just a year later, Empress Dowager Du fell sick, and Emperor Taizu personally fed her medicine and attended her by her bed. When the illness worsened, minister Zhao Pu was summoned to record the will. Empress Dowager Du asked her son, "Do you know why you became an emperor?" In tears, Emperor Taizu could not answer. The mother asked again, and Emperor Taizu responded that it was all due to the blessings of her and the ancestors. "Wrong," the mother said, "It was because Emperor Shizong of (Later) Zhou made his young kid succeed him as the emperor. Had (Later) Zhou had an older emperor, how could you become one? When you pass away, remember to pass the throne to your younger brother. The country is wide, the population is large, an older emperor is the blessing of the dynasty." Emperor Taizu cried and nodded his head. Empress Dowager Du also told Zhao Pu: "You shall also remember and follow my words." This conversation was recorded by Zhao Pu with his signature at the end and sealed in a golden shelf to be kept by reliable palace attendants.

== Family ==
The eldest of 8 children from an official family, Lady Du married general Zhao Hongyin upon reaching adulthood and bore him 7 children:

- Zhao Guangji (赵光济), 1st son, died young
- Zhao Kuangyin (赵匡胤), 2nd son, born in 927
- Zhao Kuangyi (赵匡义), later called Zhao Guangyi (赵光义) and eventually Zhao Jiong (赵炅), 3rd son, born in 939
- Zhao Kuangmei (赵匡美), later called Zhao Guangmei (赵光美) and eventually Zhao Tingmei (赵廷美), 4th son, born in 947
- Zhao Kuangzan (赵匡赞), 5th son, died young
- A daughter, originally married to Mi Fude (米福德), later married Gao Huaide after Mi's death
- Another daughter who died young

Lady Du was a strict mother who taught the children to follow rules and traditions. Her husband Zhao Hongyin died in 956.

== Notes and references ==
=== Sources ===
- Chikusa Masaaki (transl. Julia Ching) (1976). "Chao T'ing-mei". In Franke, Herbert (ed.). Sung Biographies. Wiesbaden: Franz Steiner Verlag. pp. 83–84. ISBN 3-515-02412-3.
- (in Chinese) Toqto'a; et al., eds. (1345). Song Shi (宋史) [History of Song].
- (in Chinese) Li Tao (1183). Xu Zizhi Tongjian Changbian (續資治通鑑長編) [Extended Continuation to Zizhi Tongjian].
