= Chen Zhihui =

Chinese actor

- Born: 1967 or 1968 (age 58–59)
- Occupation: Actor
- Years active: 1983–present

Chinese name
- Traditional Chinese: 陳之輝
- Simplified Chinese: 陈之辉
Transcriptions
Standard Mandarin
- Hanyu Pinyin: Chén Zhīhuī

Chen Zhihui is a Chinese actor best known for playing supporting roles in various films and television series since the 1980s. Some of his more notable roles in film include: Master Chin in Jet Li's Fearless (2006), Zhang Fei in Three Kingdoms: Resurrection of the Dragon (2008), and Master Liu in Ip Man (2008).

== Career ==
Chen is from Chengde, Hebei. In his early years, he joined a performing arts group and learnt dancing. He won an award in a national dancing competition. In 1980, he enrolled in the Hebei Medical School (now part of the Hebei Medical University). In 1986, he was accepted into the Central Academy of Drama and studied drama there.

Chen has made appearances in various films and television series since 1987. In the early 2000s, he joined the Hong Kong television network TVB for two years and acted in two TVB dramas, Blade Heart and Fight for Love.

Aside from acting, Chen also practises wushu and he specialises in Shaobei Fist (少北拳).

== Filmography ==
=== Film ===
Year	Title	Role	Notes
1987	Gandan Xiangzhao 肝胆相照	Huang Jingwu	
1994	Wing Chun 咏春	(extra)	
1995	Da Liao Taihou 大辽太后	Yelü Xiezhen	
1997	Long Chuang Zhongyuan 龙闯中原	Peng Kun	
2004	A World Without Thieves 天下无贼	(extra)	
2006	Fearless 霍元甲	Qin Lei	
2008	Three Kingdoms: Resurrection of the Dragon 三国之见龙卸甲	Zhang Fei	
2008	An Empress and the Warriors 江山美人	Diao Erbao	
2008	Ip Man 叶问	Master Liu	
2010	14 Blades 锦衣卫	Baihu	
2010	The Legend Is Born – Ip Man 叶问前传	Ip Man's father	
2010	Adventure of the King 龙凤店	Kuang	
2011	Shaolin 新少林寺	Huo Long	
2011	White Vengeance 鸿门宴	Xiahou Ying	
2013	Saving General Yang 忠烈杨家将	Huyan Zan	
2014	Hero of the River		
2018	The Bravest Escort Group		
2018	Diamond Fight		
2019	Warrior 2		

=== Television ===
Year	Title	Role	Notes
1994	Romance of the Three Kingdoms 三国演义	Bao Xin / Liao Hua / Xu Chu / Taishi Ci	
1994	San Buguan 三不管	Liang Baokui	
1994	Buyi Nü 布依女	Tan Tian	
1996	Sui Tang Yanyi 隋唐演义	Yuwen Chengdu	
1998	The Water Margin 水浒传	Wang Jin / Yang Xiong	
1998	Lanse Sanhuan 兰色三环	Gao Yuan	
1999	Shen Bu 神捕	Shangguan Buqi	
2000	Guangwudi Liu Xiu 光武帝刘秀	Deng Yu	
2001	Tianxia Liangcang 天下粮仓	Zhou Zhong	also co-director
2001	Shaonian Yingxiong Zhi Hong Wending 少年英雄之洪文定	Gao Jinzhong	
2003	The Story of Han Dynasty 大汉风	Ji Bu	
2003	Huai'an Qi'an 淮安奇案	Sun Dayou	
2004	Blade Heart 血荐轩辕	Fo Sang	
2004	Fight for Love 谈谈情练练武	Suen Cheng	
2004	Yuexia Jiangnan Zhi Di Renjie Xiyuan Lu 月上江南之狄仁杰洗冤录	Shi Chengshan	
2004	Huang Taizi Mishi 皇太子秘史	Yinti	
2005	Yingxiong Zhi 英雄志	Shi Gang	
2005	How Much Sorrow Do You Have 问君能有几多愁	Shi Shouxin	
2006	The Patriotic Knights 侠骨丹心	Yuanhai	
2006	Eight Heroes 八大豪侠	Meng Tianwen	
2006	Ming Dynasty in 1566 大明王朝1566	Qi Jiguang	
2006	The Rise of the Tang Empire 贞观之治	Qin Shubao	
2006	Empress Feng of the Northern Wei Dynasty 北魏冯太后	Feng Miao	
2007	The Great Revival 卧薪尝胆	Ling Gufu	
2008	The Shaolin Warriors 少林僧兵	Yu Dayou	
2008	Royal Tramp 鹿鼎记	Li Zicheng	
2008	Changping of the War 铁血长平	Lord Xinling	
2008	Taiwan 1895 台湾1895	Sun Kaihua	
2009	The Heaven Sword and Dragon Saber 倚天屠龙记	Yin Tianzheng / Jueyuan	
2009	Meng Laicai Chuanqi 孟来财传奇	Heda Bashi	
2009	The Qin Empire 大秦帝国	Hou Ying	
2010	Song of Spring and Autumn 春秋祭	Xian Zhen	
2010	Detective 女神捕	Long San	
2010	Kongque Ling 孔雀翎	Jin Kaijia	
2011	Journey to the West 西游记	Bull Demon King	
2013	The Patriot Yue Fei 精忠岳飞	Liu Ge	
2017	The Glory of Tang Dynasty	Guo Ziyi	
2020	Qin Dynasty Epic 大秦賦	Lian Po	
