= Xu You (Southern Tang) =

Personal details
- Born: c. 960
- Full name: Surname: Xú (徐); Given name: Yóu (游)

Xu You
- Chinese: 徐游
Transcriptions
Standard Mandarin
- Hanyu Pinyin: Xú Yóu
- Wade–Giles: Hsu^{2} Yu^{2}

Xu You (Chinese: 徐游; pinyin: Xú Yóu; born c. 960), was a Chinese official most active in the Southern Tang dynasty as a court minister, royal tutor, and artist. A member of the Xu family, comprising many government officials and civil servants, and descendant of Emperor Wu, he served as the Grand Guardian of Li Yu and enjoyed a close relationship with the royal family.

== Early life and career ==
Xu You was born in c. 960, in Haizhou, China. His father was Xu Zhihui (徐知诲), one of Xu Wen's five sons. Thus, by default, Xu was already respected for being Xu Wen's grandson. Additionally, many of Xu's relatives worked for the government. During the reign of Emperor Yuanzong, he became the Grand Guardian of Li Yu, who was heir apparent to the throne. As Grand Guardian, Xu successfully proposed the construction of a "clear mind pavilion", from which imperial commands would be relayed, on the palace grounds at Jinling. He was also the chancellor of the capital. After the fall of the Southern Tang dynasty, Xu You was appointed as a Song court director alongside Xu Xuan (徐铉).

Xu is described as a loyal subject of Li Yu. Following the death of Yuanzong in 961, Li Congshan attempted to seize the crown from the heir and his elder brother Li Yu. Viewing this as an opportune moment, the younger Li tried to coerce Xu into passing him Li Jing's final will, citing their shared genealogy and Xu's father's respect for Yuanzong. Xu was not convinced with the unlawful suggestion, however, and promptly reported the matter to the crown prince. Consequently, Li Congshan was demoted from Prince of Han to Duke of Southern Chu.

He was a "clever" inventor and reportedly built a working qiqi (Chinese: 欹器; lit. 'leaning vessel'), a time-measuring device, from scratch. By Xu's time, the qiqi had already been obsolete and virtually none of his peers knew how to operate one. He was also well-read in the arts, especially Chinese painting, and enjoyed travelling, particularly with the royal family.

Xu died of an illness. Controversially, Xu Xuan commented on his death, "Would Zhou Gong and Confucius play tricks, and cause this man to die an early death?" (Note: In Chinese: "难道周公、孔子也会作祟,致使此人早早归天?") This insinuated that Xu You was in fact a flawed official who contravened the teachings of the aforementioned sages.

== In popular media ==
Xu is mentioned in a fictitious tale collected in A Record of Ghosts and the Living, in which he dreams of a "an emissary dressed in black" who informs him that he will "become Lord of the Northern Dipper". He is also told in his dream that Chen Kangbo (陳康伯) will be his vice-magistrate; both men die concurrently a year later. This story is cited in Chen Shiyuan's Encyclopedia of Dreams (夢占逸旨) as a reason for "the noble man who cultivates himself while awaiting his destiny" to heed his dreams. Xu You is portrayed by Beijing actor Gao Yuqing in the 2005 Chinese historical drama How Much Sorrow Do You Have.
