= Zhao Tingmei =

Zhao Tingmei 趙廷美
- Prince Fudao (涪悼王)
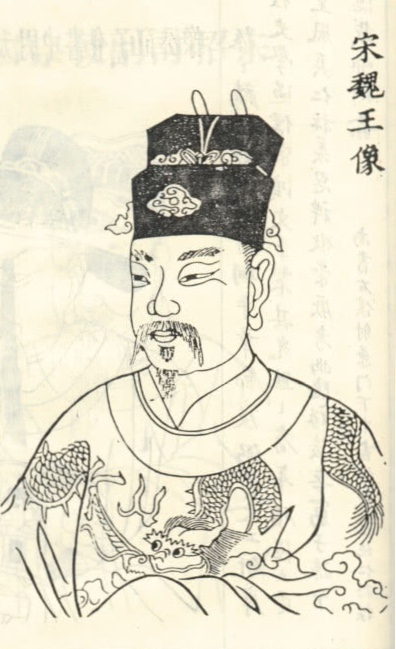
- Born: 947
- Died: 984 984 (aged 36–37); Present-day Fang County, Hubei Province, China
- Burial: Xinfeng, Lingtouxiang
- Issue: Zhao Degong; Zhao Delong; Zhao Deyi; Zhao Deyong; Zhao Dejun; Zhao Deqing; Zhao Derun; Zhao Dewen; Zhao Deyuan; Zhao Decun; Princess Zhangqing; Princess Chengqing; Princess Leping; Princess Daning; Princess Yunyang
Posthumous name
- Prince of Qin (秦王)
- House: House of Zhao
- Father: Zhao Hongyin
- Mother: Lady Geng

Zhao Tingmei (趙廷美; 947–984), formally known as Prince Fudao (涪悼王), was an imperial prince of the Song dynasty. He was the younger half-brother of Zhao Kuangyin and Zhao Jiong.

== Life ==
Zhao Tingmei is the fourth son of Zhao Hongyin born by his concubine, Lady Geng.

Zhao Tingmei was originally the Prince of Qi (齐王), and he served as the governor of Kaifeng and the commander of Zhongshu. In 979, he was named Prince of Qin (秦王). In September 981, the Beijing envoy Chai Yuxi accused Zhao Tingmei of being arrogant, and Zhao Pu also instructed Li Fu, who was in charge of the Kaifeng government, to falsely accuse Zhao Tingmei. Zhao Tingmei was exiled to Xijing was downgraded to Duke Xian of Fuling (涪陵县公).

In 984, Zhao Tingmei went to Fangzhou, and died because of anxiety. He was thirty-eight years old. Song Zhenzong restored Zhao Tingmei 's title of Prince of Qin, and Song Huizong posthumously named Zhao Tingmei the Prince of Wei.

== Family ==
=== Parents ===
- Father: Zhao Hongyin (趙弘殷, 899 – 3 September 956), Emperor Zhaowu (昭武皇帝)
- Mother: Lady, of the Geng clan (陳夫人 耿氏)

=== Consorts and issue ===
- Madame of Chu State, of the Zhang clan (楚國夫人张氏, 948－1022), daughter of Zhang Lingduo (张令铎)
  - Zhao Degong, Prince Cihui of Gaomi (高密慈惠郡王 趙德恭, 962－1006), 1st son
  - Zhao Delong, Prince Gongsu of Guangpin (廣平恭肅郡王 趙德隆, 964 – 13 February 986), 2nd son
  - Zhao Deyi, Prince Anjian of Yingchun (潁川安簡郡王 趙德彝, 968 – 9 May 1015), 3rd son
  - Zhao Deyong, Prince Kangjian of Guangling (廣陵康簡郡王 趙德雍, d. 1017), 4th son
  - Zhao Dejun, Duke of Yun State (鄖國公 趙德鈞), d.27 January 1007), 5th son
  - Zhao Deqing, Duke of Jiang State (江國公趙德欽, 974 – 7 July 1004), 6th son
  - Zhao Derun, Duke of Yuan State (原國公趙德潤, d. 3 April 1003), 7th son
  - Zhao Dewen, Prince Gongyu of Shen (申恭裕王 趙德文, 975 – 1046), 8th son
  - Zhao Deyuan, Marquis of Guzang (姑臧侯 趙德愿, 976 – 25 April 999), 9th son
  - Zhao Decun, Duke of Ji State (紀國公 趙德存, 982 – 7 July 1011), 10th son
- Madame of Changyang County, of the Pan clan (昌阳郡夫人潘氏)
- Madame of Jurong County, of the Sun clan (句容县君孙氏)
- Unknown:
  - Princess Zhangqing (长清郡主), first daughter
    - married Tian Shouxin (田守信), son of Tian Zhongjin (田重进)
  - Princess Chengqin (承庆郡主), second daughter
  - Princess Jingping (兴平郡主), third daughter
    - married Cao Xue (曹珝), son of Cao Bin (曹珝)
  - Princess Yunyang (雲陽公主), fifth daughter
    - married Han Chongye (韓崇業), son of Han Zhongyun (韩重赟)
