= Xue Juzheng =

Scholar-official

- 薛居正
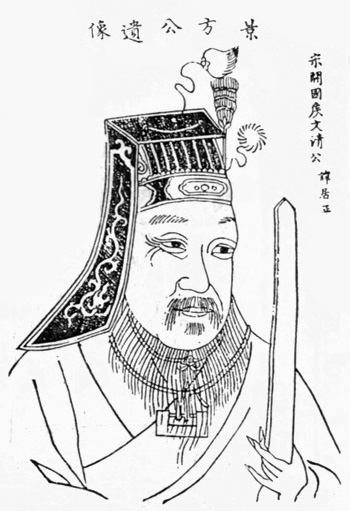
- from an 18th-century genealogy book

Chief minister of the Song dynasty
- In office October 17, 973 – July 12, 981 Serving with Shen Lun, Lu Duoxun
- Monarchs: Emperor Taizu, Emperor Taizong

Personal details
- Born: c. 912 Xunyi County, Kaifeng, Later Liang
- Died: July 12, 981 (aged 68–69) Kaifeng, Song Empire
- Children: Xue Weiji (薛惟吉), adopted son
- Parent: Xue Renqian (薛仁謙) (father)

Xue Juzheng
- Chinese: 薛居正
Transcriptions
Standard Mandarin
- Hanyu Pinyin: Xuē Jūzhèng
- Wade–Giles: Hsüeh^{1} Chü^{1}-cheng^{4}

Xue Ziping
- Chinese: 薛子平
Transcriptions
Standard Mandarin
- Hanyu Pinyin: Xuē Zǐpíng

Xue Juzheng (c. 912 – 12 July 981; courtesy name Ziping) was a scholar-official who successively served the Later Jin, Later Han, Later Zhou and Song dynasties. He was one of the chief ministers of the Song dynasty from 973 until his death.

Xue is best known today for being the lead author of the monumental history book Old History of the Five Dynasties (974).

== During the Five Dynasties ==
Born during the Later Liang, Xue Juzheng was said to be studious and ambitious from a young age. In 934 during the Later Tang Xue failed the imperial examination and wrote "An Essay to Dispel Sorrows" (遣愁文), which was much praised. He passed the imperial examination the following year.

After the Later Jin destroyed the Later Tang in 937, Xue served on the staff of Liu Suining (劉遂凝), the military governor of Hua Prefecture. In 941, he was recommended by Liu Suining's older cousin Liu Suiqing (劉遂清) and became a patrolling inspector for the Salt Monopoly. In 944, he served as a judge in the Bureau of General Accounts. When Li Song became the director for the Salt Monopoly, Xue served on his staff. Xue also received a position in the Court of Judicial Review, and subsequently he was made a reminder official in the Secretariat. In 946, when Sang Weihan was made the prefect of Kaifeng, Xue joined him as an administrative assistant.

During the Later Han, Xue once saved a commoner from execution. The man was accused of violating salt laws, but Xue found the evidence unconvincing. After further questioning he discovered bad blood between the defendant and the accuser, a minor government functionary who eventually admitted to making false accusations.

After Later Zhou's founding in 951, Xue was made vice director of the Bureau of Review, also in charge of all judges in the State Finance Commission.

== During the Song dynasty ==
When the Song dynasty replaced the Later Zhou in 960, Xue took service with the new dynasty as he had with dynasties prior to the new rulers of northern China. During the first two decades of the Song, Xue set about to compiling a history of the Five Dynasties.

Entitled Five Dynasties History, the main purpose of the work was to reinforce the claim of the Song to the Mandate of Heaven from the Tang dynasty through the Five Dynasties to the reigning Song.

== Death and legacy ==
Xue did not live much longer than after compilation of the Five Dynasties History in 974, dying in 981. However, his legacy of writing a history of a previous era of Chinese history for the purpose of bolstering the current patron dynasty would be repeated later in Chinese history, notably with the Yuan dynasty’s writing of the History of Liao.
