= Shiao Lih-ju =

- Born: Shiao Lih-ju (蕭麗珠); 1955 (age 70–71); Chiayi, Taiwan
- Education: Chinese Culture University
- Occupations: singer, television presenter
- Years active: 1974–1990
- Spouse: Soon Yuan De (m. 1990)

Chinese name
- Traditional Chinese: 蕭孋珠
- Simplified Chinese: 萧㛤珠
Transcriptions
Standard Mandarin
- Hanyu Pinyin: Xiāo Lìzhū
- Musical career
- Genres: Mandopop, Hokkien pop, J-pop

Shiao Lih-ju (born 1955) is a retired Taiwanese singer and TV presenter who released more than 30 albums in the 1970s and 1980s. She sang in Mandarin, Hokkien, and Japanese.

Shiao rose to fame after singing the theme songs of many popular films based on Chiung Yao's novels, like Fantasies Behind the Pearly Curtain (1975), Everywhere Birds Are Singing (1978), and Love Under a Rosy Sky (1979). She also sang the theme songs of many TV series, like the Singaporean historical drama The Sword and the Song (1986). In the mid-1980s, she moved to Singapore, and retired after marrying a Singaporean man in 1990.

== Awards ==
1984 Golden Bell Awards

- Won—Best Female Singer
