= Liu Zhen =

Liu Zhen is the name of:

- Liu Zhen (Western Han) (fl. 2nd century BC), Western Han dynasty marquis and son of Liu Sheng, Prince of Zhongshan
- Liu Zhen (Eastern Han) (died 217), Eastern Han dynasty writer and member of the Seven Scholars of Jian'an
- Liu Zhen (Tang dynasty) (died 844), Tang dynasty rebel
- Liu Zhen (PRC) (1915–1992), Chinese Communist general
- Liu Zhen (rower) (born 1982), Chinese rower
- Serena Liu (1975–2020), or Liu Zhen, Taiwanese dancer and actress
