= Wang Ji'en =

Wang Ji'en (simplified Chinese: 王继恩; traditional Chinese: 王繼恩; pinyin: Wángjì'ēn) (died c. 999), previously Zhang Dejun (simplified Chinese: 张德钧; traditional Chinese: 張德鈞; pinyin: Zhāngdéjūn), was an eunuch and a military general during imperial China's Later Zhou and the following Song dynasty.

== Under Later Zhou ==
Wang Ji'en was born in Shanzhou (Chinese: 陝州; pinyin: Shǎnzhōu, modern Shan County, Henan). His original surname was Wang, but his adoptive father Gentleman Zhang named him Zhang Dejun. He was one of the higher-ranked eunuch during the reign of Chai Rong, the second emperor of the Later Zhou.

== Under the Song dynasty ==
=== During Emperor Taizu's reign ===
As he requested to change his surname back to his ancestral surname, Emperor Taizu of Song named him Wang Ji'en.

== Sources ==
- (in Chinese) Toqto'a; et al., eds. (1345). Song Shi (宋史) [History of Song].
