= Xu Prefecture (Henan) =

Historical administrative division in Henan, China

Xuzhou or Xu Prefecture (許州) was a zhou (prefecture) in imperial China centering on modern Xuchang in Henan, China. It existed (intermittently) from 581 to 1913.

== Geography ==
The administrative region of Xuzhou in the Tang dynasty is in central Henan. It probably includes parts of modern:

- Under the administration of Xuchang:
  - Xuchang
  - Xuchang County
  - Yanling County
  - Changge
- Under the administration of Luohe:
  - Luohe
  - Linying County
  - Wuyang County
- Under the administration of Pingdingshan:
  - Wugang
- Under the administration of Zhoukou:
  - Fugou County
