= Li Chongjin =

- Traditional Chinese: 李重進
- Simplified Chinese: 李重进
Transcriptions
Standard Mandarin
- Hanyu Pinyin: Lǐ Chóngjìn
- Wade–Giles: Li^{3} Ch'ung^{2}-chin^{4}

Li Chongjin (李重進; died 960) was a military general during imperial China's Five Dynasties and Ten Kingdoms period and the subsequent Song dynasty. A nephew of Later Zhou's founding emperor Guo Wei, he rose to high ranks in the Later Zhou military. When Later Zhou was overthrown by Zhao Kuangyin who founded Song, Li Chongjin initially submitted to Zhao but eventually rebelled. He was defeated and committed suicide.

== Notes and references ==
=== Sources ===
- Wang Gungwu (1976). "Li Ch'ung-chin". In Franke, Herbert (ed.). Sung Biographies. Wiesbaden: Franz Steiner Verlag. ISBN 3-515-02412-3.
