= Han Tong =

Later Zhou general

Han Tong (韓通)
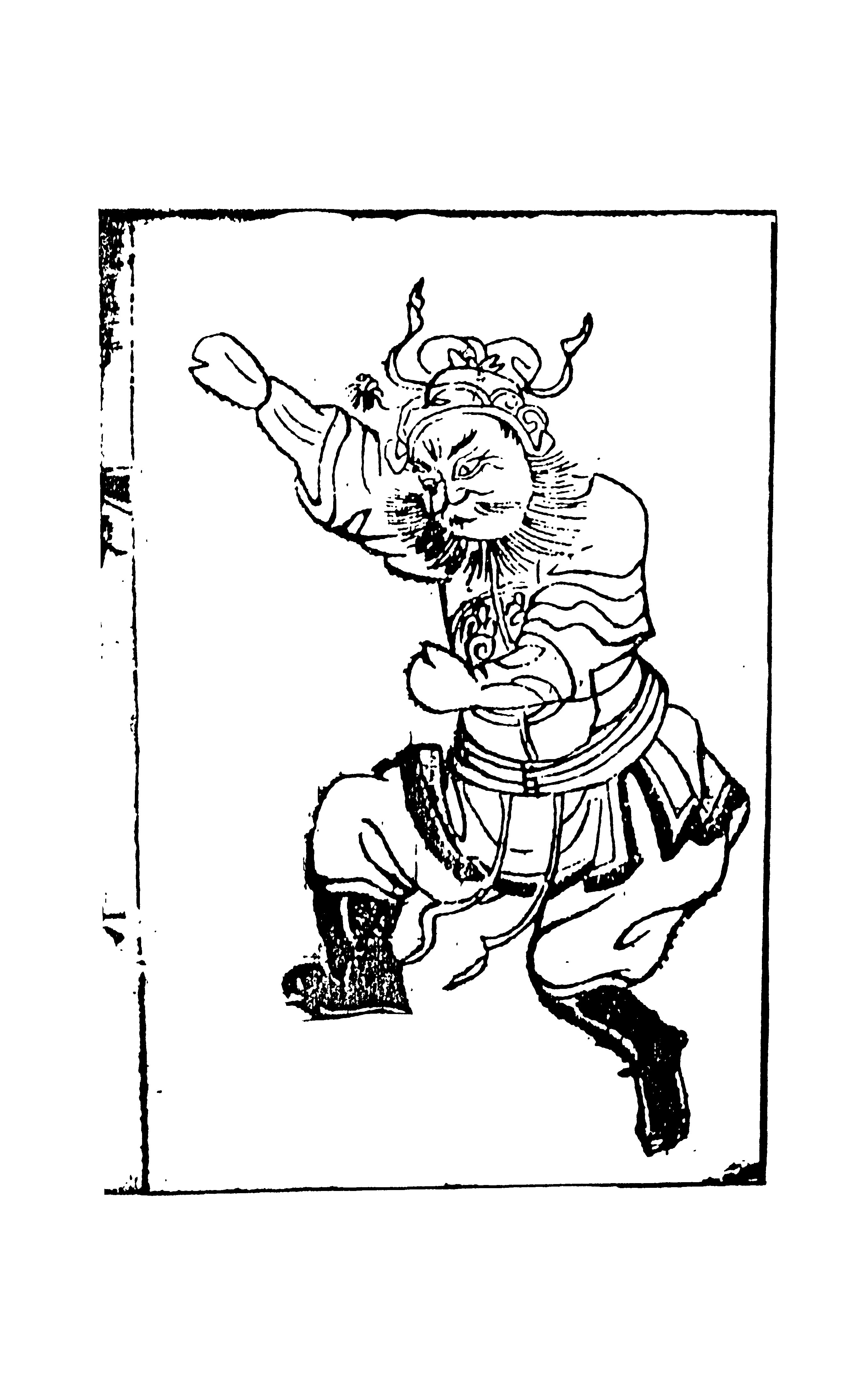
- Born: 908; Taiyuan, Jin
- Died: February 3, 960; Kaifeng, Later Zhou
- Spouses: Lady Dong (董氏); Lady Jiang (蔣氏)
- Children: Han Shoujun (韓守鈞); Han Shousu (韓守素); 2 other sons; Wife of Liu Fuzuo (劉福祚); 3 other daughters
- Parents: Han Zhang (韓章) (father); Lady Li (李氏) (mother)

Han Tong (908–3 February 960), courtesy name Zhongda, was a Chinese military officer during the Five Dynasties period who became a top general during the Later Zhou dynasty. In the early years of the Later Zhou, he strengthened the northern defense against the hostile Northern Han and Liao, and participated in the 955 invasion of the Later Shu. From 955, he remained mainly in the capital, Kaifeng, and wielded his influence during the reign of the child emperor Guo Zongxun. In 960, when general and former subordinate Zhao Kuangyin usurped the Later Zhou throne, Han Tong and his entire family were massacred by Zhao's officer Wang Yansheng.
