= Shi Shouxin =

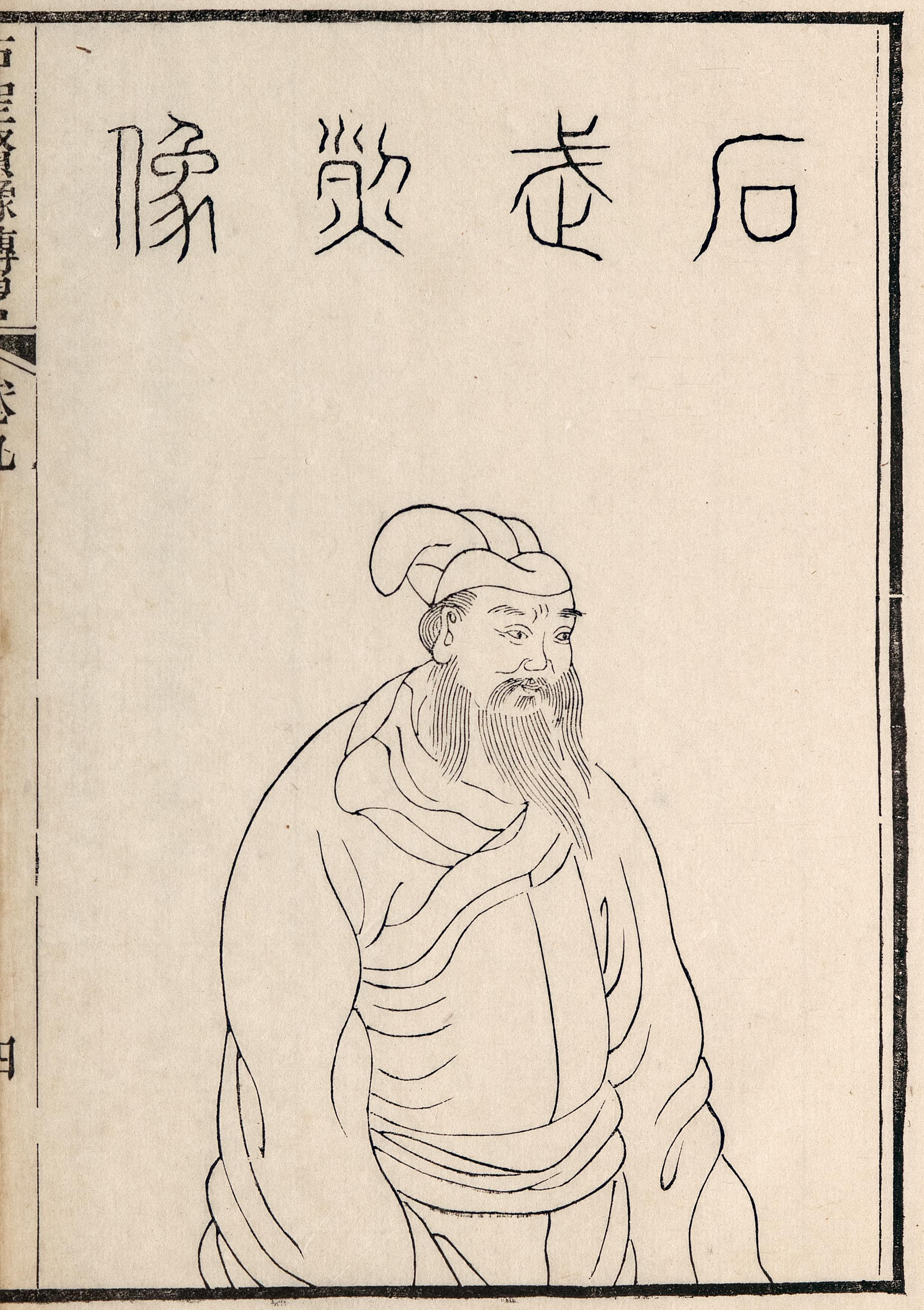

Personal details
- Born: 928 likely modern Kaifeng, Henan
- Died: 984
- Children: Shi Baoxing (石保興), son; Shi Baoji (石保吉), son
- Full name: Surname: Shí (石); Given name: Shǒuxìn (守信); Posthumous name: Wǔliè (武烈)

Shi Shouxin
- Chinese: 石守信
Transcriptions
Standard Mandarin
- Hanyu Pinyin: Shí Shǒuxìn
- Wade–Giles: Shih^{2} Shou^{3}-hsin^{4}
Yue: Cantonese
- Yale Romanization: Sek^{6} Sau^{2}-seun^{3}
- Jyutping: Sek^{6} Sau^{2}-seon^{3}
Southern Min
- Hokkien POJ: Chio̍h Siú-sìn

Shi Shouxin (Chinese: 石守信; 928–984) was a military general in imperial China, first serving the Later Zhou during the last years of the Five Dynasties and Ten Kingdoms period, and later the Song dynasty.

== Career under Later Zhou ==
Shi Shouxin first followed Guo Wei who founded the Later Zhou in 951. During Guo's early reign, Shi became an inspector-in-chief (都虞候) of the imperial guard (親衛). After the Battle of Gaoping against the Northern Han in 954, Shi was promoted to first commandant (第一軍都校) of the left imperial guard. After the siege of Taiyuan he was promoted to left and right commandant of the cavalry.

== Career under Song ==
After Later Zhou was overthrown by the Song dynasty, Emperor Taizu of Song made him a jiedushi. Later, he and Gao Huaide defeated Li Yun's rebellion, and he ordered the thousands of surrendered soldiers all executed. He also defeated Li Chongjin's rebellion.
