= Serena Liu =

Taiwanese actress (1975–2020)

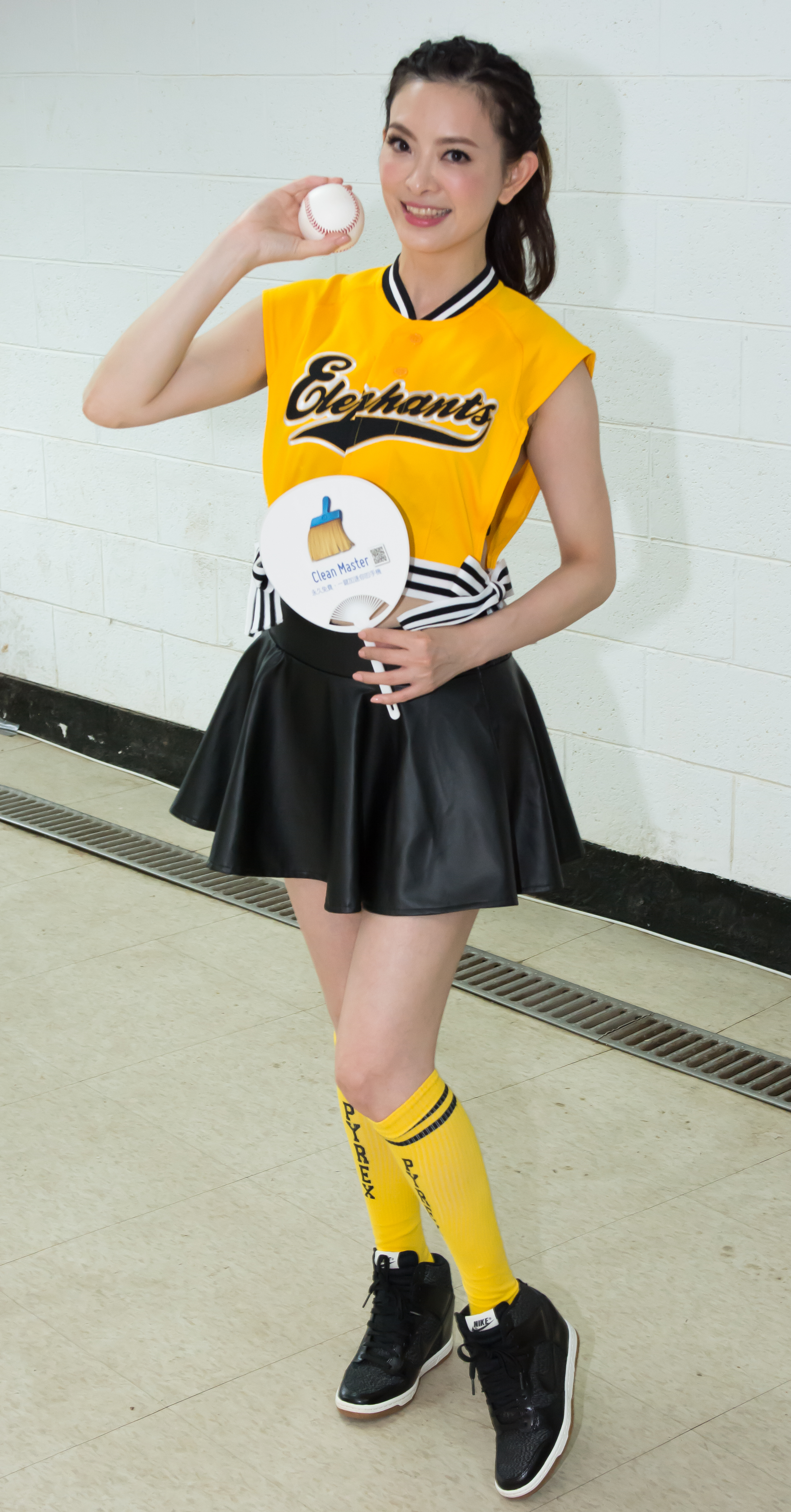
- Born: Liu Chen; 9 June 1975; Xindian, Taipei County, Taiwan
- Died: 22 March 2020 (aged 44); Beitou, Taipei City, Taiwan
- Occupations: dancer, actress
- Spouse: Shin Lung
- Children: 1

Chinese name
- Traditional Chinese: 劉真
- Simplified Chinese: 刘真
Transcriptions
Standard Mandarin
- Hanyu Pinyin: Liú Zhēn
Southern Min
- Hokkien POJ: Lâu Chin

Serena Liu (born Liu Chen; Chinese: 劉真; pinyin: Liú Zhēn; Pe̍h-ōe-jī: Lâu Chin; 9 June 1975 – 22 March 2020), also known as Serina Liu, was a Taiwanese dancer and actress.

== Early life and education ==
Liu started ballet lessons when she was a child and continued for 12 years, establishing strong foundations in dancing. She began to learn ballroom dancing at the age of 18. While studying at National Chengchi University, she continued ballroom dancing. After graduation, under her parents' persuasion, she applied for a job at a bank but ultimately at the age 23, decided to follow her passion in dance and participate in competitions.

== Career ==
Liu taught dance in appearances on variety and talk shows, before hosting her own television programs and acting in television series.

== Personal life ==
Liu and Taiwanese singer Shin Lung (辛龍) registered their marriage on 17 May 2014, and held their wedding at Ocean Crystal Chapel in Honolulu, Hawaii on 9 June in the same year. Liu announced the birth of their daughter on 15 February 2016.

=== Death ===
Liu suffered from a narrowed aortic valve. Her husband told the media that she had learnt about her condition purely by chance. Liu had taken her four-year-old daughter to see a doctor for a cold, but the young girl refused to let the doctor place a stethoscope on her chest. The doctor then demonstrated the stethoscope's use to the child by placing the device on Liu's chest. The doctor realised then that Liu had a heart murmur, and advised her to seek further treatment. Liu could have opted for an aortic valve replacement, but it would have required long-term medication after the surgery to prevent blood clots. The medication may also derail her plans to have a second child. On 7 February 2020, while undergoing a heart valve repair surgery at Taipei Veterans General Hospital, Liu had an unexpected sudden cardiac arrest and fell into a coma. Liu was then admitted to the intensive care unit and had been put on extracorporeal membrane oxygenation since then. Despite subsequent operations to deal with a developing cerebral embolism and increased brain pressure, Liu died on 22 March 2020 at the age of 44 after her body had stopped responding to medication and treatment.

== Filmography ==
=== Television series ===
Year	English title	Original title	Role	Notes
2005	How Much Sorrow Do You Have	問君能有幾多愁	Yaoniang	
2006	The Rise of the Tang Empire	贞观之治	Pipa Lady	
