= Zhao Pu =

Song dynasty Chinese politician (922–992)

Zhao Pu 趙普
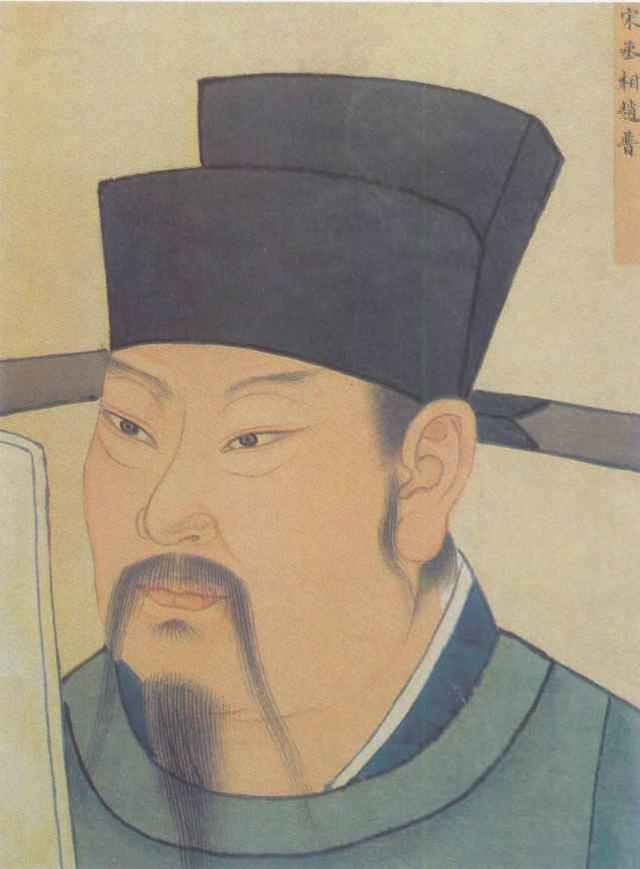

Grand Chancellor of the Song Dynasty
- In office 964–973
- Monarch: Emperor Taizu
- In office 981–983
- Monarch: Emperor Taizong
- In office 988–992
- Monarch: Emperor Taizong

Personal details
- Born: 922
- Died: 14 August 992 (aged 69–70)
- Children: Sons: Zhao Chengzong (趙承宗) Zhao Chengzu (趙承煦) Daughters: Zhao Zhiyuan (趙志願); Zhao Zhiying (趙志英)

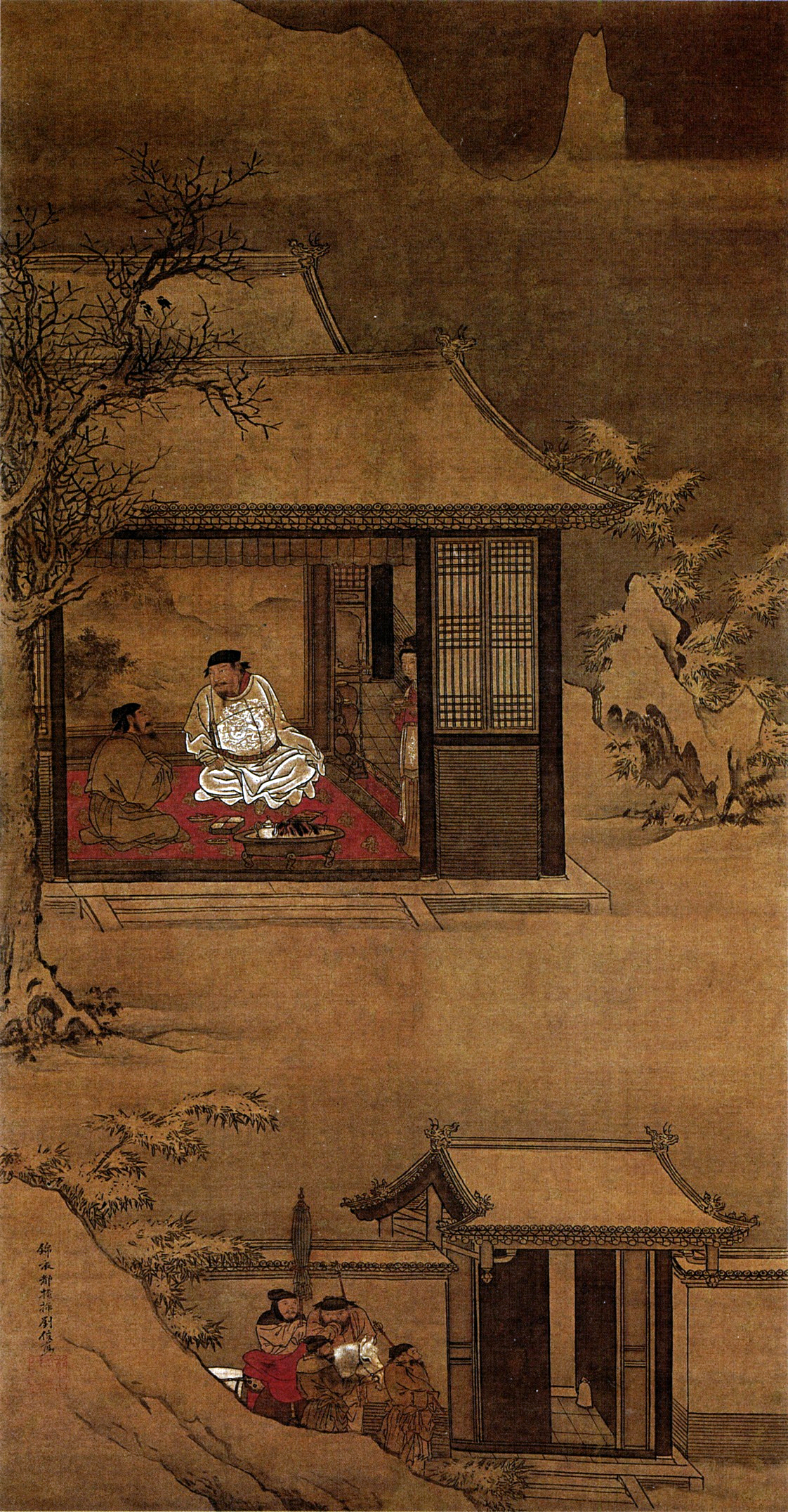
Emperor Taizu of Song visiting Zhao Pu in the early years of the Song dynasty, a 15th-century painting by Liu Jun.

Zhao Pu (922 – 14 August 992), courtesy name Zeping, was a Chinese politician and strategist during the reigns of the first two Song dynasty emperors (Emperor Taizu and Emperor Taizong), who was instrumental in plotting the seizure and consolidation of power for both of them. Despite several crises in his long career, Zhao Pu was by far the most powerful politician for most of the early Song dynasty, serving as a chief councilor (in many years the only one) three times for a total of 17 years. He has been praised for his brilliance in foreign and domestic policies which helped shape Song's Confucian outlook for the next 2–3 centuries. A proud Confucian (though not as learned as later ministers who came from the imperial examination), Zhao Pu is well known for allegedly claiming that he administered the state with "half the Analects". Confucian historians, however, also note his cunning, avarice, as well as ruthlessness towards political opponents like Lu Duoxun and Zhao Tingmei, all self-serving and un-Confucian traits.

== Biography ==
Before he entered politics, he was a tutor and was hired by the future Empress Dowager Du to tutor her son Zhao Kuangyin along with another tutor named Chen. Kuangyin always consulted Pu but ignored Chen's advice because of the tutor's constant scolding for his impatience.

Once Zhao Kuangyin became Emperor Taizu, he invited Zhao Pu to become Grand Chancellor.

In 961, he was summoned by Emperor Taizu to record the will of his mother Empress Dowager Du which she stated that upon Taizu's death, would go to his brother Zhao Guangyi and then upon Guangyi's death, would go to Zhao Guangmei, the youngest surviving brother. Before Du died, she told Zhao Pu to follow her words. Zhao Pu who recorded the entire conversation signed it and kept it in a golden box.

Zhao Pu was relieved of his post of Grand Chancellor and banished by Emperor Taizu in 973 due to rumors that he was being corrupt by the war minister Lu Duoxun (934 – 985) whom Zhao Pu bore a grudge against for repeatedly criticizing him. Lu did this to increase his own power and gain the favor of the Emperor. Pu's removal left the position of Grand Chancellor to Xue Jezheng and Shen Lun, who were appointed that same year, with Lu rising to Participant in Governance. Lu's scheme paid off, as in the winter of 976 he joined them as Grand Chancellor. However, Pu was recalled into the capital once Emperor Taizu died in which he was succeeded by Zhao Guangyi. Zhao Guangyi would become Emperor Taizong posthumously. Zhao Pu became chancellor and then accused Zhao Tingmei (c. 947 – 984 (formerly named Zhao Guangmei)) and Lu Duoxun for plotting against Emperor Taizong and as a result, Tingmei was imprisoned while Lu was exiled. It is worth mentioning that Zhao Pu advised Emperor Taizong to have his own son become Emperor instead of Zhao Tingmei.
