= Gao Huaide =

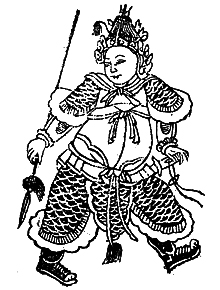
- from one 1797 print of the novel Legends of the Flying Dragon (飛龍傳)

Personal details
- Born: 926 modern Zhengding County, Hebei
- Died: 982 (aged 55–56) modern Cao County, Shandong
- Spouse: Grand Princess of Yan (燕國長公主)
- Children: Gao Chugong (高處恭), son; Gao Chujun (高處俊), son
- Father: Gao Xingzhou
- Full name: Surname: Gāo (高); Given name: Huáidé (懷德); Courtesy name: Cángyòng (藏用); Posthumous name: Wǔmù (武穆)

Gao Huaide
- Traditional Chinese: 高懷德
- Simplified Chinese: 高怀德
Transcriptions
Standard Mandarin
- Hanyu Pinyin: Gāo Huáidé
- Wade–Giles: Kao^{1} Huai^{2}-te^{2}
Yue: Cantonese
- Jyutping: Gou^{1} Waai^{4}-dak^{1}

Gao Huaide (高懷德; c. 926 – 982) courtesy name Cangyong was a general in ancient China, first in the Later Zhou military and later in the Northern Song military.

== Life ==
Gao Huaide's father Gao Xingzhou was a general in the Later Zhou military. In 944, just 18 years old, Gao Huaide accompanied his father in resisting the invasion by the Liao forces from the north. In Qicheng (near today's Puyang, Henan Province), his father was surrounded by the Liao forces and with no aid in sight, Gao Huaide fought a way out and saved his father on his horseback.

In 957, the Later Zhou military tried to invade Shouchun (in today's Shou County, Anhui Province) which was occupied by Southern Tang kingdom. At night, Gao Huaide and a few men went across the Huai River for reconnaissance and in the morning caught a Southern Tang soldier who provided important information. When Emperor Shizong of Later Zhou watched the battle from a height, he noticed a general who fought many enemies by himself, even taking the spear from the enemy's hands. He was informed that was Gao Huaide.

When Later Zhou was overthrown by the Song dynasty, Emperor Taizu of Song arranged for Gao Huaide to marry his younger sister, Princess Chang of Yan Kingdom. Along with Shi Shouxin, Gao Huaide defeated Li Yun's rebellion.
