= Zhao Hongyin =

10th-century Chinese general

Zhao Hongyin 趙弘殷
- A posthumous portrait on a hanging scroll, kept in National Palace Museum, Taipei, Taiwan
- Born: Zhao Hongyin; 899
- Died: 3 September 956 (aged 56–57)
- Burial: Yongan Mausoleum (永安陵, in present-day Gongyi, Henan 34°39′50.51″N 112°57′42.19″E)
- Spouse: Empress Dowager Zhaoxian (m. 916)
- Issue: Emperor Taizu of Song; Emperor Taizong of Song; Zhao Tingmei; Princess Gongyi
Posthumous name
- Emperor Zhaowu (昭武皇帝)
Temple name
- Xuanzu (宣祖)
- Father: Zhao Jing
- Mother: Lady Liu

Zhao Hongyin
- Traditional Chinese: 趙弘殷
- Simplified Chinese: 赵弘殷
Transcriptions
Standard Mandarin
- Hanyu Pinyin: Zhào Hóngyīn
- Wade–Giles: Chao^{4} Hung^{2}-yin^{1}
Yue: Cantonese
- Yale Romanization: Jiu^{6} Wang^{4}-yan^{1}
- Jyutping: Ziu6 Wang4-jan1
Southern Min
- Hokkien POJ: Tiō Hông-in

Zhao Hongyin (899 – 3 September 956) was a Chinese general during the Five Dynasties and Ten Kingdoms period.

After his death, his son Zhao Kuangyin founded the Song dynasty in 960. His other son Zhao Kuangyi would also become a Song emperor. For this reason, Zhao Hongyin is posthumously honored as "Emperor Xuanzu (宣祖) of Song". All emperors of the Song dynasty were his descendants via either Emperor Taizu (most emperors of the Southern Song) or Emperor Taizong (most emperors of the Northern Song).

== Early life ==
Zhao Hongyin decided against a civil career and became a military officer instead under Zhuangzong of Later Tang: he knew that in times of disunity it would be a military career that would lead to success.

The young Zhao Hongyin was a skilled horse archer. He originally served the warlord Wang Rong, the ruler of the de facto independent Zhao State, and was once ordered by Wang to lead 500 cavalries to assist their ally Li Cunxu in battles, presumably against the Later Liang. Impressed by his bravery, Li kept Zhao as part of his imperial army after the fall of Zhao in 921.

It was also around this period that he married Lady Du who was 3 years his junior. According to popular rumour a few decades after his death, when Zhao Hongyin first came to the area by himself, he encountered a snowstorm and had to beg for food from servants in official Du Shuang's (杜爽) house. After a few days, the servants noticed that he was hardworking and persuaded Du to keep him in the house. A few months later, the family arranged for him to marry their eldest daughter.

== Family ==
- Parents
  - Zhao Jing (宋翼祖趙敬), honoured as Emperor Yizu
  - Lady Liu (簡穆皇后劉氏), honoured as Empress Jianmu
- Consorts and children
  - Empress Dowager Zhaoxian, of the Du clan (昭憲皇太后 杜氏; 902–961)
    - Zhao Guangji, Prince Yong (邕王 趙光濟), first son
    - Princess Gongxian (恭獻帝姬), first daughter
    - Zhao Kuangyin, Taizu (太祖 趙匡胤; 927–976), second son
    - Princess Gongyi (恭懿帝姬; d. 973), second daughter
      - Married Gao Huaide (高懷德; 926–982) in 960, and had issue (one daughter)
    - Zhao Jiong, Taizong (太宗 趙炅; 939–997), third son
    - Zhao Guangzan, Prince Qi (岐王 趙光贊), fifth son
  - Lady, of the Geng clan (陳夫人 耿氏)
    - Zhao Tingmei, Prince Fudao (涪悼王 趙廷美; 947–984), fourth son
