= Guo Zongxun =

Later Zhou emperor from 959 to 960

Emperor Gong of Later Zhou 後周恭帝

Emperor of the Later Zhou dynasty
- Reign: 28 July 959 – 3 February 960
- Predecessor: Guo Rong (Emperor Shizong)
- Regent: Empress Dowager Fu
- Chancellors: Fan Zhi; Wang Pu; Wei Renpu (魏仁浦)
- Born: 14 September 953; Chanzhou, Later Zhou (modern Qingfeng County, Henan, China)
- Died: 973 (aged 20); Fangzhou, Northern Song (modern Fang County, Hubei, China)
- Burial: Shun Mausoleum (順陵, in modern Xinzheng, Henan); 34°33′55.04″N 113°41′54.66″E
Names
- Surname: Guō (郭) or Chái (柴); Given name: Zōngxùn (宗訓)
Era dates
- Xiǎndé (顯德), continued from Emperor Taizu and Emperor Shizong; Year 6: 11 February 959 – 30 January 960; Year 7: 31 January 960 – 19 January 961
Posthumous name
- Emperor Gong (恭皇帝)
- House: Chai (by birth); Guo (adoptive)
- Dynasty: Later Zhou
- Father: Chai Rong (Emperor Shizong)

Chai Zongxun
- Traditional Chinese: 柴宗訓
- Simplified Chinese: 柴宗训
Transcriptions
Standard Mandarin
- Hanyu Pinyin: Chái Zōngxùn

Guo Zongxun (Chinese: 郭宗訓) (14 September 953 – 973) or Chai Zongxun (Chinese: 柴宗訓), also known by his posthumous name as the Emperor Gong of Later Zhou (Chinese: 後周恭帝), was the third and last emperor of the Later Zhou dynasty during the Five Dynasties and Ten Kingdoms period. As the only child of Guo Rong (Emperor Shizong of Zhou), he ascended the throne in July 959, when his father suddenly died of illness during a northern military expedition attempting to recapture the Sixteen Prefectures from the Khitans Liao dynasty. His reign ended just months later in February 960, when the six-year-old emperor was usurped in a mutiny led by royal guard general Zhao Kuangyin, who founded the Song dynasty.

After the usurpation, Guo Zongxun was sent away with his mother Empress Dowager Fu to Xijing (西京), where he was renamed to his father's birth surname Chai. Despite assurance by Zhao Kuangyin (now Emperor Taizu of Song) that the Chai family would be treated with respect and granting of lifetime judicial amnesty, he was killed in 973 by Xin Wenyue, an official trying to gain favour with the emperor. Upon hearing the news, the Emperor Taizu ordered a period of national mourning and buried the dethroned emperor next to the Emperor Shizong's tomb.

== Notes and references ==
=== Sources ===
- Mote, F.W. (1999). Imperial China: 900–1800. Cambridge, Mass.: Harvard University Press. ISBN 0-674-44515-5.
- (in Chinese) Xue Juzheng; et al., eds. (974). Wudai Shi (五代史) [History of the Five Dynasties].
- (in Chinese) Ouyang Xiu (1073). Wudai Shiji (五代史記) [Historical Records of the Five Dynasties].
- (in Chinese) Sima Guang (1086). Zizhi Tongjian (資治通鑑) [Comprehensive Mirror for Aid in Government].

Guo Zongxun House of Chai (954–960) Born: 953 Died: 973
Regnal titles
Preceded by Emperor Shizong of Later Zhou	Emperor of the Later Zhou; 959–960	Succeeded by Emperor Taizu (Song Dynasty)
