= Li Kaifang =

- 李开芳
- Died: Possibly 1855; Caishikou Execution Grounds
- Military career
- Allegiance: Taiping Heavenly Kingdom
- Conflicts: Taiping Rebellion: Jintian uprising; Battle of Wuchang; Northern Expedition

Li Kaifang was a military leader of the Taiping Rebellion from Luchuan, Guangxi, China. In 1851, he was promoted to the rank of corps superintendent. While campaigning in Hunan in 1852, he was promoted three times, rising to the rank of commander. After helping to capture Wuchang and Hanyang in Hubei, he was ultimately named chief chancellor of the Earth Department. Along with Lin Fengxiang, Li lead the Taiping vanguard during the march toward Nanking and occupied Yangzhou in April 1853. Both would also lead the ill-fated Northern Expedition. Li was captured on March 31, 1855 in Fengguantun, Shandong. Li was then executed by lingchi at the Caishikou Execution Grounds.
