= Fan (surname) =

Fàn (Chinese: 范; pinyin: Fàn) is a Chinese family name. It is also one of the most common surnames in Vietnam, where it is written as Pham (范 - Phạm), and occurs in Korea as Beom (范, 범). It is the 46th name on the Hundred Family Surnames poem in Chinese.

== Fàn (范) ==
=== History ===
The House of Fàn (Fàn Family or Fàn Clan) is a Chinese noble family that traces its origins to the model Emperor Yao, a legendary Chinese ruler who lived from 2358 to 2258 BCE. Emperor Yao is a 5th generation descendant of Emperor Huang (or Yellow Emperor), and the second son of Emperor Ku.

Until the Zhou dynasty (1122–256 BCE), the Fàns are associated with the Du Clan.

It is said that Duke of Tangdu (Du Bo), a direct descendant of Emperor Yao, was murdered by the penultimate king of the Western Zhou dynasty, King Xuan (周宣王, 827–781 BCE). The Duke's son, Xian Shu (隰叔, also called Du Xian or "Uncle Xian") fled to the state of Jin (present day Shanxi Province) and was eventually appointed Minister of Justice (shishi 士師).

Xian Shu's son Shi Wei (士蒍) is the first person to use Shi (士, literally, judge) as a family name.

Du Bo's great-grandson, Shi Hui (士会, posthumously called Fàn Wuzi (范武子)), distinguishes himself by defeating the neighboring tribes as Commander in Chief of the Jin army and is ennobled as Duke of Sui and Duke of Fàn. He gains the title Fàn Hui (范会), and is rewarded with lands southeast of Fàn (now Fan County Fànxian 范縣 in Henan) and the city of Jiexiu in south-central Shanxi province. His descendants adopted the place name, Fàn, as their kin's name and surname and more rarely assumed the name of Sui or Shi.

Shi Hui's son takes the name of Fàn Quan (or Fàn Ziwen) and greatly expands the influence of the Fàn family as a powerful aristocratic force within the ancient state of Jin during the beginning of the Spring and Autumn period (771 to 476 BCE). Fàn Quan institutes the civil system for Jin, making it the earliest kingdom during the Spring and Autumn period to do so.

For some time, the Fàn family is the most powerful aristocratic family within the state of Jin, and along with the Zhao, Han, Wei, Zhonghang and Zhi families comprised the six dominating clans of the state. Nevertheless, the Fàn family remained vassals to the Dukes of Jin until the later split of the Jin State. See Fàn Zhongyan

In 490 BCE, the Fàn and Zhonghang clans are decisively defeated by the combined Zhao, Han, Wei, and Zhi forces. Subsequently, Fàn Jishe and Zhonghang Yin led their people to the State of Qi. See Duke Ding of Jin.

Around 473 BCE, the line of Fàn Li moves to the new capital of Yue in Wu (in what is now Suzhou province). Shortly after, Fàn Li resigned from the chancellorship of Yue and married Xi Shi, one of the renowned Four Beauties of ancient China.

284-260 B.C. marks the period of the Zhao state, which reached its climax in 269 B.C. when its forces decisively defeated two Qin armies. This paved the path for Fan Sui (also known as Fan Ju), a former Wei statesman, to ascend to the position of chief minister to King Zhao. From this position, he halted the rise of the warlords who had accumulated large fortunes, assembled armies, and crowned themselves monarchs during the Warring States period. His death, occurring in tandem with the death of Qin chief general Bai Qi, marked the end of a notable period of Warring States history and the inevitability of Qin dominance in the following decades.

In 689, Fàn Lübing, a descendant of Fàn Li, becomes de facto chancellor of the Tang dynasty. His grandson, Fàn Sui, would become the 5th generation ancestor of the famous Song dynasty chancellor Fàn Zhongyan.

In 960 after serving under 11 other emperors and 5 dynasties including a decade-long chancellorship for the Later Zhou dynasty, Fàn Zhi (范質) becomes the first Chancellor of the new Song dynasty to Zhao Kuangyin, Emperor Taizu of Song.

During the Song dynasty (960–1279) the Fàn family is one of several key families able to successfully transition from the Tang military aristocracy to a new elite gentry class of scholar bureaucrats. During this period, the family flourishes and cultivates substantial political and economic wealth, helping to govern the Middle Kingdom at the helm of the chancellorship for the longest period of any family. Prominent political figures during this era include Fàn Zhi (范質), Fan Zhongyan, Fàn Chunren (范純仁), Fàn Chunli (范純禮) and Fàn Chengda (范成大).

Modern-day Fàn County (范县) is located in the Puyang prefecture of north east Henan province. According to Baidu, the area's population is estimated at 504,000. Members of the Fàn family continue to thrive across a variety of different domains. The family's hometown is considered to be 40 miles northwest of Jingxian in Shandong province.

Some families of this name are derived from the Mǐ (芈) surname.

- From Jurchen (孛鲁术氏)
- From Manchu
- The corresponding Vietnamese version is Phạm.
- From some ancient people in Champa (Linyi, 林邑), Vietnam.

== Notable people with the surname Fàn (范) ==
=== Historical figures ===
- See House of Fàn, Fàn family or Fàn Clan
- Shi Hui, Sui Hui or Fàn Hui (范会), also known as Fàn Wu Zi, Duke of Fàn, Duke of Sui, progenitor of the aristocratic Fàn family and Commander in Chief of the Jin army
- Fàn Li (范蠡), advisor to the king of Yue state, chancellor of Qi and ancestor of Fàn Lübing (ancestor of Fàn Zhongyan)
- Fàn Lishe, leader of the military-aristocratic Fan Clan who fought during the War of the Clans. See Duke Ding of Jin
- Fan Ju, chancellor of the Qin dynasty
- Fàn Kuan, considered among the great master Song artists of the tenth and eleventh centuries
- Chen Fan (陳蕃), Grand Commandant during the reign of Emperor Huan and Grand Tutor during the reign of Emperor Ling of the Eastern Han dynasty
- Fan Jian (politician) (樊建), official of the state of Shu Han and Jin dynasty
- Fàn Yun (范雲), poet, friend and de facto chancellor of the Southern Qi dynasty during the reign of Emperor Wu of Liang
- Fàn Tai (范泰), military general of the Eastern Jin dynasty, father of Fàn Ye
- Fàn Ye (范曄), historian and politician of the Liu Song dynasty, son of Fàn Tai
- Fàn Zhen (范縝), philosopher and court official of the Southern Qi dynasty
- Fàn Lübing (范履冰), chancellor of the Tang dynasty during the first reign of Emperor Ruizong, ancestor of Fàn Zhongyan
- Fàn Dongfen (范冬芬), ancestor of "the Fans of Huizhou", state bureaucrat of the Tang dynasty, son of Fàn Lübing
- Fàn Dongqian (范冬倩), state bureaucrat of the Tang dynasty, son of Fàn Lübing
- Fàn Dongchang (范冬昌), state bureaucrat of the Tang dynasty, son of Fàn Lübing
- Fàn Sui (范隋), 6th generation grandson of Fan Lübing and 5th generation ancestor of Fàn Zhongyan, county magistrate of Lishui during the reign of Emperor Yizong of Tang
- Fàn Shouyu (范守遇), staff supervisor (判官) serving the Later Liang dynasty, father of Fàn Zhi,
- Fàn Zhi (范質), first chancellor of the Song dynasty, Duke of Lu
- Fàn Mengli (范夢齡), Fàn Zhongyan's great-grandfather, conferred as Duke of Xu (徐國公) posthumously
- Fàn Zanshi (范贊時), Fàn Zhongyan's grandfather, conferred as Duke of Cao (曹國公) and Duke of Tang (唐國公) posthumously
- Fàn Yong (范墉), Fàn Zhongyan's father, conferred as Duke of Su (蘇國公) and Duke of Zhou (周國公) posthumously
- Fàn Zhongyan (范仲淹), chancellor of the Song dynasty, Duke of Wenzheng, Duke of Chu
- Fàn Chunyou (范純佑) (1024–1063), son of Fàn Zhongyan
- Fàn Chunren (范純仁) (1027–1101), chancellor of the Song dynasty, prominent member of the conservative faction during the Wang Anshi Reforms, ratified as the Duke of Zhongxuan (忠宣公) posthumously, son of Fàn Zhongyan
- Fàn Chunli (范純禮)(1031一1106), chancellor of the Song dynasty, ratified as the Duke of Gongxian (恭獻公) posthumously, son of Fàn Zhongyan
- Fàn Chuncui (范純粹) (1046–1117), son of Fàn Zhongyan
- Fàn Chengda (范成大), Song dynasty poet, geographer, and court official
- Laurent-Joseph-Marius Imbert (范世亨), French-born missionary Bishop in Asia

=== Modern people ===
- Christine Fan (范瑋琪), Taiwanese singer
- Fan Bai, researcher and engineer
- Fan Bingbing (范冰冰), Chinese actress, older sister of Fan ChengCheng
- Fan Changjiang (范长江), Chinese journalist
- Fan Changlong (范长龙), Vice Chairman of the China Central Military Commission
- Fan Chengcheng (范丞丞), Chinese singer and rapper, younger brother of Fan Bingbing. Former member of Nine Percent and member of NEXT
- Fan Chun Yip (范俊業), Hong Kong footballer
- Fan Enrui (范恩睿), Singaporean historian, writer and poet
- Fan Hanjie (范漢傑), Chinese military general who served during the Second Sino-Japanese War and Chinese Civil War
- Fan Jian (legal scholar) (born 1957), Chinese legal scholar and lawyer
- Fan Jie (范洁), Chinese badminton Olympian
- Fan Lei (范磊), Chinese-born American musician
- Fan Ruijuan (范瑞娟), Chinese opera singer
- Fan Wanzhang (范万章)(1927–1952), Chinese pilot
- Fan Wei (范偉), Chinese film actor
- Fan Yi Ling (范宜灵), Chinese Model and Idol
- Fan Zhiyi (范志毅), Chinese footballer
- Fann Wong (范文芳), Singaporean film actress
- Huan Cheng Guan (范清渊), Malaysian politician and businessman
- Huang Tiong Sii (范长锡), Malaysian politician and businessman
- Lingling Fan, Chinese and American power engineer
- Mavis Fan (范曉萱), Taiwanese singer
- Michael Fam Yue Onn (範佑安), Singaporean civil engineer
- Rita Fan (范徐麗泰), former president of the Legislative Council of Hong Kong

== See also ==
- Fen (name)

== Equivalents in other cultures ==
Names from other cultures meaning 'bee', just as Fan, are, among others:

- Deborah (Hebrew)
- Madhukar (Sanskrit)
- Melissa (Greek)
