= Fan Zhi =

1st Chancellor of the Song dynasty
- In office 5 March 960 – 26 February 964 Serving with Wang Pu and Wei Renpu
- Monarch: Emperor Taizu of Song
- Succeeded by: Zhao Pu

Chancellor of the Later Zhou dynasty
- In office 27 July 951 – 3 February 960
- Monarchs: Guo Wei; Chai Rong; Chai Zongxun

Personal details
- Born: 911 or January 912 likely Zongcheng, Later Liang (in today's Wei County, Hebei)
- Died: 5 November 964 (aged 52–53) Kaifeng, Henan, China
- Children: Fan Min (范旻), son
- Occupation: Essayist, historian, jurist, politician
- Full name: Surname: Fàn (范); Given name: Zhì (質); Courtesy name: Wénsù (文素)
- Father: Fan Shouyu (范守遇)

Fan Zhi
- Traditional Chinese: 范質
- Simplified Chinese: 范质
Transcriptions
Standard Mandarin
- Hanyu Pinyin: Fàn Zhì
- Wade–Giles: Fan^{4} Chih^{4}
Yue: Cantonese
- Yale Romanization: Faan^{6} Jat^{1}
- Jyutping: Faan^{6} Zat^{1}

Fàn Zhi (Chinese: 范質) (c. 911 – 5 November 964), formally the Duke of Lu (魯國公), was a Chinese essayist, historian, jurist, and politician who served under 12 emperors of 6 dynasties during imperial China's Five Dynasties and Ten Kingdoms period and the subsequent Song dynasty. He was the Later Zhou chancellor from 951 until 960, and the Song dynasty chancellor from 960 until 964, not long before his death. A strict adherent to legal guidelines, he had influenced Later Zhou and Song rulers to rely more on civil administration in an age dominated by the military. Fàn was a member of the elite Fàn family.

== Early life ==
Growing up, Fàn Zhi's father Fan Shouyu (范守遇) was a staff supervisor (判官) serving the Later Liang. Biographer Jack Dull considers Fàn Zhi a representative of the rise of "new families" which were gradually replacing the exclusive aristocracy of the Tang dynasty. At age eight, Fàn Zhi was able to write essays, and by 12 he already mastered and began teaching the voluminous classic Book of Documents.

== Career under Later Tang ==
Later Liang was replaced by the Later Tang in 926, and Fàn passed the imperial examination in 933. The chief examination administrator He Ning (和凝) reportedly liked Fàn's writing the most that he intentionally assigned Fàn 13th place, which was the placing he himself got back in the day. Fàn became a prefectural judge (推官) for the Zhongwu Commandery (忠武軍; roughly governing today's central Henan), and was later promoted to the post of subprefect of Fengqiu which he served until Later Tang was overthrown in 936.

== Career under Later Jin ==
Under the new Later Jin, Fàn's essays caught the eyes of chancellor Sang Weihan, who helped Fàn become the imperial investigating censor (監察御史), a lowly position at the censorial offices. When Sang was subsequently appointed to other prefectures and eventually back as the chancellor, Fàn followed him along the way. In 943, Fàn Zhi was promoted to the post of assistant division chief of the Department of Hospitality (主客員外郎) and auxiliary official of the Institute of History (直史館). A year later, he became a Hanlin Academician and division chief (郎中) of the Department of Accounting, Ministry of Finance (比部), as well as special drafting of the Secretariat (知制誥).

== Career under Later Han ==
While Guo Wei (郭威, a general and the future founder of the Later Zhou, was serving in the Later Han court, he was impressed by Fan Zhi. Guo later appointed Fan as vice-commissioner of military affairs.

== Career under Later Zhou ==
Guo Wei, had been impressed by the timeliness and the contents of the imperial orders he received while fighting rebellions away from the capital. Once he asked the messenger who wrote the orders. "Fàn Zhi" was the reply, and Guo remarked, "Definitely fit to be chancellor."

In the winter months of early 951, Guo Wei rebelled against the Later Han emperor Liu Chengyou and his army swiftly conquered the capital Kaifeng. Amidst the chaos after Liu's fleeing from the city, Guo remembered the name Fàn Zhi and asked for his whereabouts. When Fàn – who was living with other commoners – was located, Guo paid him a personal visit in heavy snow and during the conversation, removed his own robe to put on Fàn for warmth. As a token of his friendship to Guo, Fàn wrote several imperial orders for Guo, helping him to transition the state as Guo declared himself the emperor of the new Later Zhou dynasty. Fan was appointed as chancellor following Guo's ascension to the throne.

== Career under Song ==
One day in 960, Fàn was dining in his own residence when general Zhao Kuangyin, who was supposed to be on the way to resist the Liao dynasty invasion, stormed in. In tears, Zhao explained to Fàn that he was forced to become the emperor and return to the capital by his subordinates. Stunned and not sure what to suggest, Fàn was confronted by Zhao's attendant Luo Yangui (羅彥瓌), who raised his sword to threaten Fàn into accepting the usurpation. When Fàn realized that everything was nothing but acting, he came down the stairs and bowed to Zhao, who became the first emperor of the Song dynasty.

== Notes and references ==
=== Sources ===
- Dull, Jack L. (1976). "Fan Chih". In Franke, Herbert (ed.). Sung Biographies. Wiesbaden: Franz Steiner Verlag. pp. 310–321. ISBN 3-515-02412-3.
- (in Chinese) Toqto'a; et al., eds. (1345). Song Shi (宋史) [History of Song].
- (in Chinese) Li Tao (1183). Xu Zizhi Tongjian Changbian (續資治通鑑長編) [Extended Continuation to Zizhi Tongjian].
- (in Chinese) Sima Guang (1086). Zizhi Tongjian (資治通鑑) [Comprehensive Mirror for Aid in Government].
- Twitchett, Denis; Smith, Paul Jakov (2009). The Cambridge History of China Volume 5 Part One: The Sung Dynasty and its Precursors, 907-1279. Cambridge University Press. ISBN 978-0-521-24330-8.
