= Sanfotsi =

Southeast Asian trading polity (c. 12th century)

Sanfotsi (Chinese: 三佛齊; pinyin: Sānfóqí), also written as Sanfoqi, was a trading polity in Southeast Asia mentioned in Chinese sources dated from the Song dynasty circa 12th century. In 1918, George Cœdès concluded that Chinese forms of San-fo-ts'i (Sanfoqi), Fo-ts'i (Foqi), Fo-che (Foshi), Che-li-fo-che (Shilifoshi), which correspond to Arabic Sribuza and can be reconstructed as Śribhoja, are names referring to the Srivijaya empire, located in Palembang, South Sumatra, in present-day Indonesia. After the Chola invasion of 1025, the term Sanfoqi has been proposed to refer to the Melayu kingdom, since the Chola invasion may have caused the disintegration of the Srivijaya mandala, and the mandala then re-centered in Jambi.

Others argued that Sanfotsi is more likely a transliteration of Suvarnabhumi, which may refer to Suvarnadvipa or Sumatra.

== Accounts ==
Chinese accounts mentioned a place named Shilifoshi (室利佛逝), and this is taken to mean Srivijaya. However, after 904 the named changed to Sanfotsi or Sanfoqi (三佛齊, literally "three vijayas"). Song dynasty annals recorded a number of missions sent from Sanfoqi between 960 and 1018.

Chinese records also indicated that there were at least two different places named Sanfoqi after the Chola attack on Palembang: Sanfoqi-Zhanbei (for Jambi) and Sānfóqí Zhu nian (Kedah).

Sanfotsi as a state is recorded in many Chinese sources such as the Chinese annals Chu-fan-chi written by Chau Ju-kua, and Ling-wai tai-ta by Chou K'u-fei (Chinese: 周去非; pinyin: Zhōu Qùfēi; Wade–Giles: Chou Ch'ü-fei). Excerpts here translated by Hirth and Rockhill:

=== Hsin-Tang-shu ===
This Tang dynasty chronicle Hsin-Tang-shu mentioned that the envoy of Mo-lo-yu (Melayu Kingdom) came to Chinese court in 644–645. While the envoy of Shih-li-fo-shih (Srivijaya) came for the first time in 670.

=== Yijing ===
The Tang dynasty monk Yijing visited Srivijaya, which was Palembang, and wrote of the country and its Buddhism. He also wrote that Malayu had "become Srivijaya" when he returned in 689.

=== Chu-fan-chi ===
Sanfotsi lies between Chon-la (Kamboja) and She-po (Java). Its rule extends over fifteen chou (provinces, or towns). It lies due south of Tsu'an-chou.

In the winter, with the monsoon, you sail a little more than a month and then come to Ling-ya-mon, where one-third of the passing merchants put in before entering this country of Sanfotsi.

A large proportion of the people are surnamed P'u. The people either live scattered about outside the city, or on the water on rafts of boards covered over with reeds, and these are exempt from taxation.

They are skilled at fighting on land or water. When they are about to make war on another state they assemble and send forth such a force as the occasion demands. They appoint chiefs and leaders, and all provide their own military equipment and the necessary provisions. In facing the enemy and braving death they have not their equal among other nations.

During most of the year the climate is hot, and there is but little cold weather. Their domestic animals are very much like those of China.

They have wine of flowers, wine of coconuts, and wine of areca nuts and honey, all fermented, though without any yeast of any kind, but they are so intoxicating to drink.

— translated by Friedrich Hirth and W. W. Rockhill

=== Ling-wai-tai-ta ===
Sanfotsi is in the Southern Ocean (South China Sea). It is the most important port-of-call on the sea-routes of the foreigners from the countries of Toupo on the east and from the countries of the Ta-shi (Arabs) and Ku-lin (Quilon) on the west; they all pass through it on their way to China.

The country has no natural products, but the people are skilled in fighting. When they are about to fight, they cover their bodies with a medicine which prevents swords wounding them. In fighting on land or on water none surpass them in impetuosity of attack; even the Ku-lin people come after them. If some foreign ship, passing this place, should not enter here, an armed party would certainly come out and kill them to the last.

This country has great store of rhinoceros, elephants, seed-pearls and medicinal aromatics. It is a custom of this people to make rafts to float on the water and to live on them.

— translated by Friedrich Hirth and W. W. Rockhill

== Interpretations ==
The established theory has concluded that Sanfotsi or Sanfoqi is identical to Srivijaya. Srivijaya was written in older Chinese sources as Shi-li-fo-shi (室利佛逝, also shortened as fo-shi) which is an approximate phonetic rendering, but changed to San-fo-qi at the end of the Tang dynasty. San means "three" in Chinese, therefore the term can be read as "the three vijayas"; this has been suggested as Chinese recognition that it was not a centralized empire at some time in its history.

The name Sanfotsi continued to be used in Chinses sources after the Chola invasion. Ling-wai-tai-ta mentioned that in the years of 1079, 1082, and 1088 the country of Chan-pi (Jambi) located in Sanfotsi sent envoys to China. In the 12th century, Shi-li-fo-shi (Srivijaya) only twice sending envoys to China; 1156 and 1178. The equation of Shi-li-fo-shi (Srivijaya or Palembang) with Sanfotsi may be problematic, since Chu-fan-chi mentioned that Palembang was one of the vassal states that belongs to Sanfotsi. On the other hand, Jambi or Malayu was not mentioned as Sanfotsi's vassal. This could mean that at that time Sanfotsi was centered in Jambi or Malayu, not in Palembang. Many historians now believe that Srivijaya may no longer be the appropriate name for the overlord's centre after 1025, when Sanfotsi referred to Jambi.

Sanfotsi is also argued to be a transliteration of Suvarnabhumi, which refers to Suvarnadvipa or Sumatra. In this interpretation the kingdom was Suvarnabhumi (Sanfotsi or Sumatra) while the capital was shifted between Palembang (Shi-li-fo-shi or Srivijaya) and Jambi (Chan-pi or Mo-lo-yu).

Historian Liam Kelley argues that the Sanfoqi mentioned in 14th century Chinese sources refers to Angkor in Cambodia.

Some Thai historians, such as Chand Chirayu Rajani, while agreeing with the designation of Sanfoqi with Srivijaya, argued that it refers to Chaiya in Thailand rather than Palembang.

== See also ==
- Zabag kingdom
