= Wang Pu (Song dynasty) =

Chancellor of imperial China's Later Zhou and Song Dynasty

1st chancellor of the Song Dynasty
- In office 5 March 960 – 26 February 964 Serving with Fan Zhi and Wei Renpu
- Succeeded by: Zhao Pu

chancellor of Later Zhou
- In office 27 July 951 – 3 February 960

Personal details
- Born: 922 or January 912 likely Bingzhou, Jin (in today's Taigu County, Shanxi)
- Died: September or October 982 (aged 59–60) Kaifeng, Henan, China
- Children: Wang Yisun (王貽孫), son; Wang Yizheng (王貽正), son; Wang Yiqing (王貽慶), son; Wang Yiju (王貽矩), son
- Full name: Surname: Wáng (王); Given name: Pǔ (溥); Courtesy name: Qíwù (齊物)
- Father: Wang Zuo (王祚)

Wang Pu (王溥) (922–982) was a chancellor of imperial China's Later Zhou and Song Dynasty.

He also wrote the important historiographical books Tang Huiyao and Wudai Huiyao after his retirement.

== Notes and references ==
=== Sources ===
- Dull, Jack L. (1976). "Wang P'u". In Franke, Herbert (ed.). Sung Biographies. Wiesbaden: Franz Steiner Verlag. pp. 1131–1137. ISBN 3-515-02412-3.
- (in Chinese) Toqto'a; et al., eds. (1345). Song Shi (宋史) [History of Song].
- (in Chinese) Li Tao (1183). Xu Zizhi Tongjian Changbian (續資治通鑑長編) [Extended Continuation to Zizhi Tongjian].
- (in Chinese) Sima Guang (1086). Zizhi Tongjian (資治通鑑) [Comprehensive Mirror for Aid in Government].
