= Shi Hui (Spring and Autumn Period) =

Shi Hui (Chinese 士会), posthumously known as Fàn Wu Zi (Chinese 范武子), was a general and politician of Jin during 7th and 6th century BC. He was the founder of Fan Clan. He fought in the Battle of Chengpu in 632 BC, and was appointed by Duke Wen as his right charioteer when the Jin army returned.

Shi Hui was a great-great-grandson of Du Bo, Shi Hui had a son, who changed his surname to Liu and was the ancestor of Liu Taigong.

== Biography ==
=== Service under Lord Zhao Dun ===
In 621 BC, Duke Xiang died. Since the crown prince, Ji Yigao (son of Duke Xiang), was still a minor, Ji Yong (son of Duke of Wen) was named his successor. Shi Hui, under orders from Lord Zhao Dun, traveled to Qin with the minister, Xian Mie, to welcome Ji Yong as the new ruler of Jin. In April 620 BC, Duke Kang of Qin escorted Ji Yong back to his hometown. While Shi Hui was in Qin, Mu Ying (wife of Duke Xiang) argued that Ji Yigao should not be dethroned. Fearing Mu Ying, Zhao Dun and others appointed Ji Yigao as Duke Ling of Jin. On April 1, Zhao Dun attacked and defeated the Qin army escorting Ji Yong at Linghu. The next day, Shi Hui defected to Qin and served under Duke Kang of Qin.

=== Service under Duke Kang of Qin ===
In the winter of 615 BC, Duke Kang of Qin invaded Jin in retaliation for the Battle of Linghu. Jin sent an army to resist and confronted the Qin forces at Hequ. On December 4th, Qin attacked the Jin upper army, but the upper army remained silent. Zhao Chuan pursued the Qin army but was unable to catch up. Upon returning, he angrily accused the upper army of not fighting. The upper army officers said they were waiting for an opportunity to fight. Unable to formulate a plan, Zhao Chuan declared he would fight alone and led his soldiers. Zhao Dun, fearing that Zhao Chuan would be captured, led the entire army. Once the battle began, both sides quickly retreated. That night, a Qin emissary arrived and expressed his desire to fight again the next day. Yu Pian noticed the Qin emissary's anxious eyes and unusual voice, suspecting that the Qin army might flee at night, and suggested that the Jin army pursue them. Xu Jia and Zhao Chuan, believing their own forces would not suffer any losses, did not fight as promised. This was neither merciful nor brave. The Qin army blocked the camp gates, blocking the Jin army's advance. The Qin army escaped during the night. Soon after, the Qin army invaded Jin again and entered the city in Xia.

In the summer of 614 BC, the Six Ministers of Jin met to discuss Qin's appointment of Shu Hui. Amid disasters, officials debated whether to reinstate Shi Hui or Hu Shegu. The Jin schemed to lure Shi Hui back through a staged rebellion led by Wei Shouyu, but Shi Hui refused to return, citing loyalty, the safety of his family, and the potential harm to his lord.

In 607 BC, Duke Ling of Jin executed a cook for undercooking a bear's leg. The body was placed on a dustpan and carried around the palace on a woman's head. Zhao Dun and Shi Hui, upon seeing the corpse's hands, questioned the reason for the murder and became concerned. They wanted to appeal to the Duke. Shi Hui objected. Duke Ling of Jin said he would make amends, but did not actually do so. Zhao Dun repeatedly advised him, but Duke Ling of Jin disliked him and repeatedly sent people to assassinate him. Duke Ling of Jin was eventually killed by Zhao Chuan.

=== Aiding the Zheng ===
In 606 BC, Duke Cheng of Jin sent an army to attack the state of Zheng, reaching the Yan lands. Zheng and Jin held peace negotiations, and Shi Hui traveled to Zheng to forge an alliance. In the winter of 599 BC, King Zhuang of Chu attacked the state of Zheng. Shi Hui came to Zheng's aid and drove the Chu forces north of the Ying River.

=== Leading the Jin against the Chu ===
In 597 BC, King Zhuang of Chu led his army to besiege Zheng. In June, the Jin army, led by General Shi Hui, set out to rescue Zheng. When they reached the Yellow River, news arrived that Zheng had made peace with Chu. Xun Linfu, general of the central army, wanted to retreat. Shi Hui argued that a virtuous and well-ordered state like Chu should not be attacked lightly and emphasized seizing the right opportunities, reorganizing the army, and targeting the weak. He condemned retreating without a fight as cowardly, mentioning the Jin’s bravery and capable vassals, and refused to follow "unmanly" orders.

Shi Hui led the Central Army across the Yellow River, forcing the Jin forces to pursue. When Chu’s Prime Minister appealed for restraint, but Shi Hui disregarded this intervention.

=== Defeat at the Battle of Bi ===
Wei Qi and Zhao Zhan, frustrated at being denied high-ranking positions, were sent as emissaries to Chu. Xi Ke warned that their malice could endanger Jin, but Shi Hui advised caution, arguing that provoking Chu recklessly would risk the army. Despite Xian Hu’s disagreement, Shi Hui led ambushes at Mount Ao. When Wei Qi and Zhao Zhan drew Chu’s forces, the Jin army panicked, but Shi Hui protected the Upper Army’s rear and organized a strategic retreat. Though the Jin army was defeated, the Upper Army survived. This engagement became known as the Battle of Bi. In the winter of 596 BC, the Jin people blamed Xian Hu for their defeat at the Battle of Bi and his collusion with Beidi, and had him killed. Shi Hui succeeded him as deputy commander of the central army. In the spring of 593 BC, Shi Hui led an army to destroy Beidi. In March, Jin presented the captured Beidi people to King Ding of Zhou. After King Ding's instructions, Duke Jing of Jin gave Shi Hui full uniform on March 27th and appointed him commander of the central army and Taifu (a deputy who governs the country when the king is a child or absent). All of Jin's bandits fled to Qin.

=== Solving Zhou's dispute ===
In the winter of 593 BC, he settled a dispute within the Zhou royal family and was treated well by King Ding of Zhou, but he felt ashamed that he had not known the etiquette, and after returning to China he restored the ritual laws established by Duke Wen of Jin as Jin law.

=== Revenge of Xi Ke against Qi ===
In 592 BC, Xi Ke of Jin, insulted by the Duke of Qi’s mother, sought revenge but was denied military support by Duke Jing of Jin. Observing that Xi Ke’s anger needed an outlet, Shi Hui resigned to allow Xi Ke to assume command without internal conflict. Xi Ke was promoted to General of the Central Army, and in 589 BC, he led Jin to defeat Qi, avenging the earlier humiliation.

In September 589 BC, the Jin army returned victorious, and Shi Xie was the last to enter the city. Shi Hui said to him, "Xie, don't you know that I am eagerly awaiting your return?" Shi Xie replied, "This army is led by Xi Ke, commander of the central army. They have achieved victory, and the people have joyfully welcomed them. If I were to return first, the people would focus their attention on me and I would receive the honors in place of the commander. Therefore, I dare not do that," Shi Hui said. "If I do so, I am confident that we can avoid disaster."
