= Herbert Franke =

Herbert Franke may refer to:

- Herbert Franke (sinologist) (1914–2011), German historian of China
- Herbert W. Franke (1927–2022), Austrian scientist and writer
