= Fan clan =

Chinese clan in the Spring and Autumn period

The Fàn Clan (Chinese: 范氏; pinyin: Fànshì) established itself as one of the six most powerful clans within the State of Jin during the Spring and Autumn period of ancient China. The clans were collectively called the Six Titled Retainers of Jin (Chinese: 晋国六卿; pinyin: Jìn-guó Liùqīng). These six aristocratic families dominated Jin in the late Spring and Autumn period, basically using the ruling duke as a figurehead until Jin was split into three separate states.

Shi Hui (士会), posthumously called Fàn Wuzi (范武子), great-grandson of Du Bo Duke of Tangdu, is considered the founder. He distinguished himself by defeating the neighbouring tribes as Commander in Chief of the Jin army and was ennobled as Duke of Sui and Duke of Fàn. He gained the title Fàn Hui(范会), and was rewarded with lands south-east of Fàn (now Fan County Fànxian 范縣 in Henan).

In 497 BCE, a dispute broke out between the Zhao clan, and the Fan and Zhonghang clans. The Fan and Zhonghang forces attacked Zhao, but were defeated and forced to retreat to the city of Zhaoge as the other three other clans (Han, Wei, and Zhi) came to Zhao's defence. Seven years later, in 490 BCE, the combined Jin forces decisively defeated Fan Jishe and Zhonghang Yin, leaders of their respective clans, forcing them to flee to the State of Qi. Later the Han, Zhao, and Wei clans would grow stronger leading to the partition Jin from 481 BCE into the new states of Han, Zhao, and Wei and finally destruction of the Jin State in 386 BCE.

The line of descent is as given in the table below:

Personal name	Posthumous name	Period of Reign
Shi Hui (士會 or 隨會)	Fàn Wu Zi (范武子)	593 BC-?
Shi Xie (士燮)	Fàn Wen Zi (范文子)	?-575 BC
Shi Gai (士匄)	Fàn Xuan Zi (范宣子)	574 BC-547 BC
Shi Yang (士鞅)	Fàn Xian Zi (范献獻子)	546 BC-?
Shi Jishe (士吉射) or Fàn Jiyi (范吉射)	Fàn Zhao Zi (范昭子)	?-490 BC

== See also ==
- Fan (surname)
