= Lepingpu =

Lepingpu 乐平铺镇
- Town
- Location in Shandong Lepingpu (China)
- Coordinates: 36°27′16″N 116°15′15″E
- Country: People's Republic of China
- Province: Shandong
- Prefecture-level city: Liaocheng
- County: Chiping
- Time zone: UTC+8 (China Standard)

Lepingpu (Chinese: 乐平铺镇) is a town in Chiping County, Liaocheng, in western Shandong province, China.
