= Hantun =

Hantun 韩屯镇
- Town
- Location in Shandong Hantun (China)
- Coordinates: 36°40′16″N 116°08′20″E
- Country: People's Republic of China
- Province: Shandong
- Prefecture-level city: Liaocheng
- County: Chiping
- Time zone: UTC+8 (China Standard)

Hantun (Chinese: 韩屯镇) is a town in Chiping County, Liaocheng, in western Shandong province, China.
