= Fen (name) =

Fen is a given name, sometimes of Chinese origin, especially as a transliteration of the Chinese character 芬 (pinyin: Fēn).

Fen may also be a surname in countries other than China, such as Uzbekistan where it is represented in Cyrillic as Фен.

Fen or Fenna is also an unrelated Frisian name.

Fen is also a gender neutral given name in English, meaning wetland fed by ground or surface water.

== Given name ==
- Fen Yang (born 1982), Congolese table tennis player of Chinese origin
- Yao Fen (b. 1967), Chinese badminton Olympic medal winner

Fen is also a part of the names of several other notable people, including:

- Lin Yan Fen (b. 1971), Chinese badminton Olympic medal winner
- Min Xiao-Fen (living), Chinese-American musician

=== Other ===
- Fen Cresswell (1915-1966), cricketer from New Zealand
- Fen McDonald, (1891–1915), Australian footballer
- Fen Osler Hampson

== See also ==
- Fan (surname)
