= Fan Jie =

Chinese handball player (born 1976)

Fàn Jie (simplified Chinese: 范洁; traditional Chinese: 範潔; pinyin: Fàn Jié; born October 25, 1976, in Beijing) is a Chinese handball player who competed at the 2004 Summer Olympics.

In 2004, she finished eighth with the Chinese team in the women's competition, playing all seven matches as goalkeeper. She is a member of the Fàn family.
