= Wudai Huiyao =

- Author: Wang Pu
- Original title: 五代會要 (Wǔdài Huìyào)
- Language: Classical Chinese
- Genre: Chinese historiography
- Publication date: 961
- Publication place: Northern Song dynasty
- Original text: 五代會要 (Wǔdài Huìyào) at Chinese Wikisource

Wudai Huiyao (Chinese: 五代會要; lit. 'Institutions of the Five Dynasties') is a Chinese historiography book on the Five Dynasties (907–960) in Chinese history. It was compiled by the Northern Song chancellor Wang Pu, who had personally served the last two of the Five Dynasties, namely the Later Han and the Later Zhou.

After collecting as much information on government systems in the chaotic period as he could find, he carefully examined the material before compiling it into Wudai Huiyao. The work was presented, along with Wang's Tang Huiyao, the Tang dynasty counterpart, to Emperor Taizu of Song. It was published in 30 chapters.
