= Northern Expedition (Taiping Rebellion) =

Military campaign of the Taiping Heavenly Kingdom

- Part of Taiping Rebellion
- Northern Expedition Route
Date	May 8, 1853 – March 31, 1855
Location	China
Result	Qing victory: The Northern Expeditionary Army was annihilated

Belligerents
Qing dynasty	Taiping Heavenly Kingdom; Nian forces

Commanders and leaders
(Qing dynasty) Sengge Rinchen (Qing dynasty) Qishan	Li Kaifang (executed); Lin Fengxiang (executed)

Units involved
60,000 Eight Banners soldiers	~70,000–80,000

Casualties and losses
8000 Killed	20,000 elite troops were annihilated

The Northern Expedition (Chinese: 太平天國北伐) was a failed campaign by the Taiping Heavenly Kingdom against the Qing dynasty during the Taiping Rebellion. Its purpose was to capture Beijing and then complete an encirclement of northern and western China. Launched in May 1853, the Northern Expedition would travel from Jiangsu to Zhili before being destroyed in early 1855.

== Planning ==
The Northern Expedition was conceived by Yang Xiuqing shortly after the fall of Nanjing. It was intended to march northward to Beijing before turning westward and ultimately meeting with concurrent Western Expedition, which was to attack Sichuan. The Taiping believed that such a pincer movement could capture all of western and northern China. It was also intended to, in conjunction with the Western Expedition, relieve pressure on the Taiping's holdings caused by the Qing's formation of the Northern and Southern Fronts.

== The expedition ==
The Northern Expedition, under the command of Lin Fengxiang and Li Kaifang, departed Yangzhou on May 8, 1853, after breaking through Qing Imperial Commissioner Qishan's defences. In Pukou, the Expedition received reinforcements from Nanjing and advanced toward Chuzhou, Anhui. Initially, the force moved rapidly through Anhui and then Henan, leaving no supply stations or garrisons behind and declining to besiege any well-defended cities.

The Taiping army reached the Yellow River by June, but the Qing had ordered all boats be removed from the southern shore. However boats were discovered at Fan County in late June. Only 30,000-40,000 Taiping troops were able to cross the river until Qing forces arrived. With his forces divided, Li Kaifang was forced to give up the siege of Huaiqing.

The Taiping forces at times cooperated with members of the Nian militias.

The force continued to recruit locals as it marched, swelling to a size of approximately 70,000-80,000 by the time they reached Huaiqing (also known as Qingyang), Henan.

Abandoning its prior strategy, the Northern Expedition unsuccessfully besieged Huaiqing for two months. This was nothing short of disaster for the expedition; the Qing inflicted heavy losses on the Taiping and Beijing gained valuable time to prepare for the coming army.

After abandoning the siege, the Northern Expedition retreated west into Shanxi but headed north again towards Zhili.The Manchu court was so sure that the rebels would take Beijing that they ordered for all future tax revenues to be sent towards Manchuria. They also called in infantry and cavalry from Manchuria and Mongolia to fortify the capital in the event of an attack.

However, on October 30 the Northern Expedition did not immediately storm Beijing but instead marched towards Tianjin. Li sent for reinforcements and anticipated that they arrive by February, but Taiping troops were unable to handle the winters of Northern China. On February 5, Li ordered a retreat back south. The delay in attacking Beijing allowed the imperial army time to regroup, enabling the Qing to successfully counterattack. Qing generals went so far as breaking the dikes of the Grand Canal to flood the rebels.

A relief army was sent north from Anqing in early 1854, but it was never able to reach the Northern Expedition as planned. Li and his top officers were captured on May 31, 1855.

== Assessment ==
A critical error was the Northern Expedition's decision to forego attacking Beijing in favour of Tianjin. Had the Taiping immediately besieged Beijing, it is likely that it would have fallen. Tactical blunders, severe weather, and shortages of provisions also contributed to the campaign's failure. Ultimately, the Northern Expedition was a complete disaster, culminating in almost the entire force being destroyed by March 31, 1855.
