= Fan Lübing =

Chinese politician (?–690)

Fàn Lübing (范履冰, died March 26, 690) was a Chinese politician during the Tang dynasty, serving as chancellor during the first reign of Emperor Ruizong. He was a member of the elite Fàn family.

== During Emperor Gaozong's reign ==
It is not known when Fàn Lübing was born. Fàn passed the imperial examinations in the Jinshi class and served as Hucao Canjun(戶曹參軍) under Li Xian, Prince of Zhou son of Emperor Gaozong. During Emperor Gaozong's Shangyuan era (674–676), Fàn and several colleagues also known for literary talent—Liu Yizhi, Yuan Wanqing (元萬頃), Miao Chuke (苗楚客), Zhou Simao (周思茂), and Han Chubin (韓楚賓)—were asked to serve as advisors to Emperor Gaozong's powerful wife Empress Wu (later known as Wu Zetian), and they wrote a number of works on her behalf, including the Biographies of Notable Women (列女傳), Guidelines for Imperial Subjects (臣軌), and New Teachings for Official Staff Members (百僚新誡). Collectively, they became known as the "North Gate Scholars" (北門學士), because they served inside the palace, which was to the north of the imperial government buildings, and Empress Wu sought advice from them to divert the powers of the chancellors.

== During Emperor Ruizong's first reign ==
Emperor Gaozong died in 683 and was succeeded by his son Li Zhe (i.e. Li Xian, Prince of Zhou) the Crown Prince (as Emperor Zhongzong), but Empress Wu retained actual power as empress dowager and regent. In 684, after he showed signs of independence, she deposed him and replaced him with his younger brother Li Dan the Prince of Yu (as Emperor Ruizong), but thereafter wielded power even more firmly. During her regency over Emperor Ruizong, Fàn Lübing served successively as Luantai Shilang (鸞臺侍郎)—the deputy head of the examination bureau of government (鸞臺, Luantai)—and deputy minister of civil service affairs (春官侍郎, Chunguan Shilang). As of 689, he was serving as the minister of civil service affairs (春官尚書, Chunguan Shangshu), when he was given the designation of Tong Fengge Luantai Pingzhangshi (同鳳閣鸞臺平章事), making him a chancellor de facto. He was also in charge of editing the imperial history. In 690, however, he was accused of having recommended as an official someone who later committed treason, and Empress Dowager Wu ordered him arrested and executed.

== Descendants ==
Fàn had three sons, each of whom passed the imperial examinations in the Jinshi class.

- Fàn Dongfen (范冬芬), also known as the ancestor of "the Fàns of Huizhou". His grandson Fàn Ping (范平) was the ancestor of another branch called "the Fàns of Jiangxi"
- Fàn Dongqian (范冬倩)
- Fàn Dongchang (范冬昌)

Fàn also had a 6th-generation grandson named Fàn Sui (范隋) who would serve as county magistrate of Lishui during the reign of Emperor Yizong of Tang. Fàn Sui was better known as the 5th-generation ancestor of Fàn Zhongyan.

== Notes and references ==
- New Book of Tang, vol. 201.
- Zizhi Tongjian, vol. 204.
