= Battle of Wuchang =

Conflict during the Taiping Rebellion (1852)

- Part of Taiping Rebellion
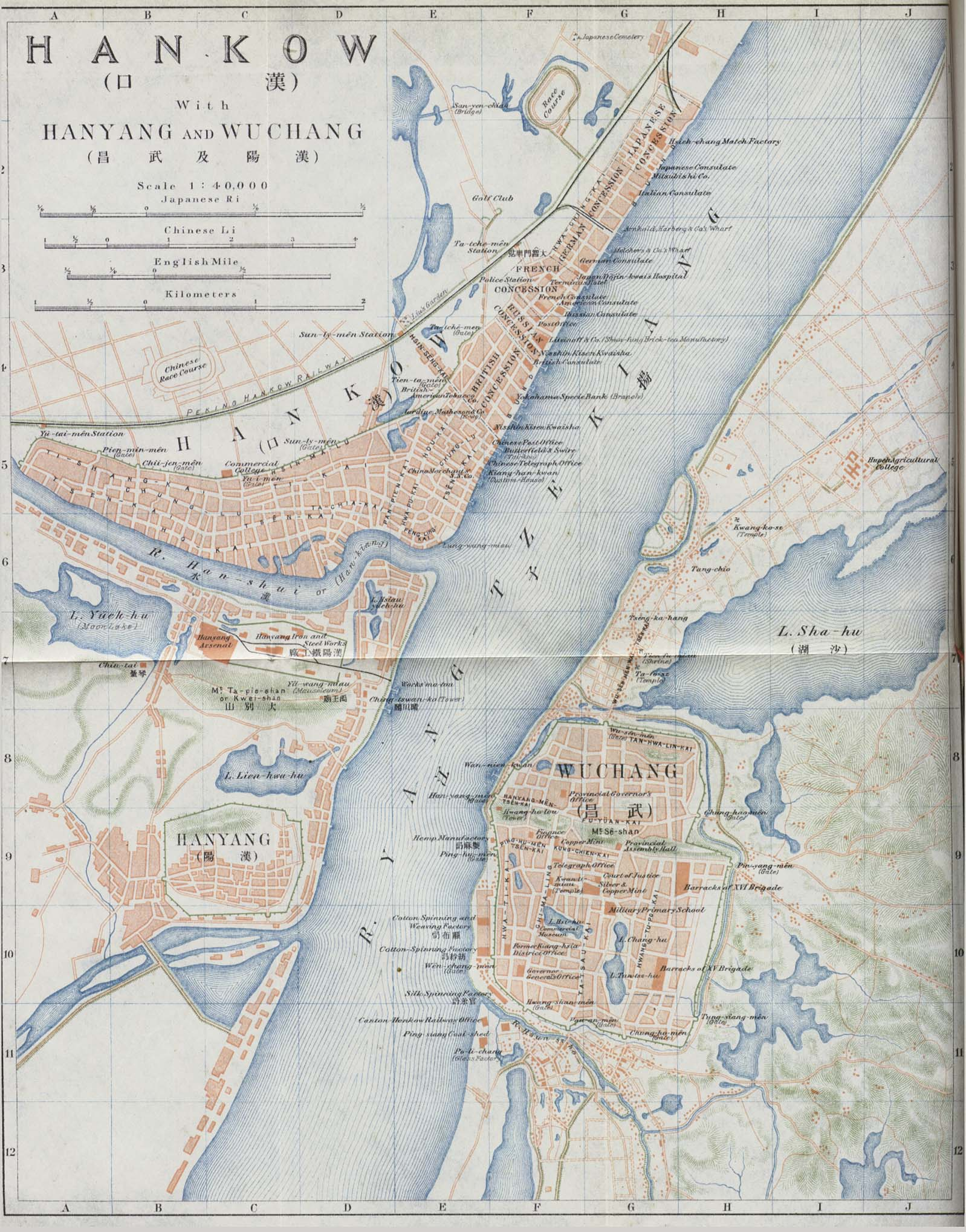
- Wuchang is on the left (Southern) bank of the Yangtze River, seen in a 1915 map
Date	December 1852 – January 1853
Location	Wuchang, Hubei
Result	Wuchang and surrounding areas captured by Taiping

Belligerents
Qing dynasty	Taiping Heavenly Kingdom

Commanders and leaders
?	Hong Xiuquan

The Battle of Wuchang occurred in 1852 during the Taiping Rebellion in Wuchang, part of the modern-day city of Wuhan.

== Background ==
In November 1852, Hong Xiuquan called off the siege of Changsha. The Taiping armies advanced northward down the Xiang River toward Wuchang, the capital of Hubei.

The Taiping advance towards Wuchang took very deceptive maneuvers so as to ward off pursuit from Qing forces. Taiping forces would embark onto land and abandon their boats at one spot. Then, they would unexpectedly seize new fleets when descending upon some unsuspecting river town. They also destroyed bridges as they passed them to delay pursuit, recruiting the boatmen along with their boats to check the advance of the Qing forces. In other cases, they would deploy pontoon bridges to allow crossing of the river, then float them downstream to use again. Taiping forces advanced forward around three hundred miles in twenty-five days.

== Battle ==
The Taiping army reached the Dongting Lake by December and occupied Yueyang with little resistance. They seized over 5,000 boats, arms, and other supplies. Upon reaching the banks of the Yangtze River, they moved swiftly east downstream, instead of at once attacking the strongly walled and massively guarded city of Wuchang. The Taiping leaders in a surprise maneuver sent their troops to the north shore and to seize the two wealthy but poorly defended commercial towns of Hanyang and Hankou, which were taken by the end of December. After capturing these two towns, the Taipings constructed two huge floating bridges by linking boats together across the Yangtze, so they could attack Wuchang on its weaker northern face.

The Hubei governor ordered his garrison to burn all the homes outside the Wuchang city walls to give them clearer fields of fire. The residents of Wuchang were promised cash rewards for every Taiping soldier they captured, twenty ounces of silver for every male Taiping head with hair so long one can tell it belongs to a veteran soldier, and ten ounces for each Taiping head with the shorter hair of recent recruits to the rebel ranks.

City defenders blocked the city gates with earth and rocks and created sunken listening posts to pinpoint the undermining of their walls to counteract siege tunneling. But the people were resentful of the destruction of their homes and seemed sympathetic to the Taiping propaganda. Wuchang was besieged for twenty days, and the city fell to the Taipings on January 12, 1853.

== Aftermath ==
After hearing of a large Qing army to the north, the Taiping forces decided not to march directly towards Beijing, and instead headed east along the Yangtze River towards Nanjing, where they hoped to use as a launching pad for future campaigns in North China. This decision has been criticized as "one of the greatest strategic errors in the history of the movement".

Wuchang became one of the first major cities where Taiping social policies are implemented.

On October 14, 1854, the Xiang Army led by Zeng Guofan recaptured Wuchang and Hanyang for the Qing. Then on April 3, 1855, the Taiping Western Expedition captured the area again. Finally, the Qing permanently regained control of the area on December 19, 1856.
