= Zhu Fan Zhi =

Book by Zhao Rukuo

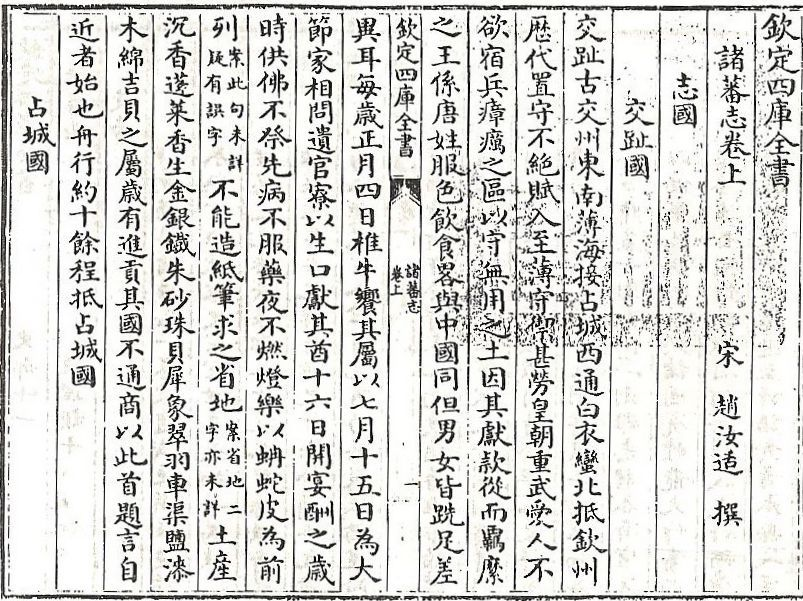
A page from Zhu fan zhi, with description of Jiaozhi.

Zhu Fan Zhi (simplified Chinese: 诸蕃志; traditional Chinese: 諸蕃志; pinyin: Zhū Fān Zhì; Wade–Giles: Chu-fan-chi), variously translated as A Description of Barbarian Nations, Records of Foreign People, or other similar titles, is a 13th-century Song Dynasty work by Zhao Rukuo. The work is a collection of descriptions of countries and various products from outside China, and it is considered an important source of information on the people, customs and in particular the traded commodities of many countries in South East Asia and around the Indian Ocean during the Song Dynasty.

== Background ==
The author Zhao Rukuo (1170-1231) was a member of the Song Dynasty imperial clan. He was posted to Fujian as a supervisor of the maritime trade in Quanzhou. While working in Fujian, he had the opportunity to meet merchants from various countries from whom he gathered information on various countries around the world. He also took note of the various products traded, studied the maps of the period, and together with the information he had learnt he wrote the book which was finished around 1225 CE. Zhao wrote: "Assigned to this post recently, I spend all day reading various maps... I listed names of these countries and their customs... I removed hearsay and kept facts. I thus name this book Zhu Fan Zhi."

Many entries of the Zhu Fan Zhi take information from other older works, such as Zhu Yu's Pingzhou Ketan (萍洲可談) from 1116, Duan Chengshi's 9th century Miscellaneous Morsels from Youyang, and other works. In particular it borrowed heavily from the 1178 work Lingwai Daida by another geographer, Zhou Qufei (Chinese: 周去非; pinyin: Zhōu Qùfēi; Wade–Giles: Chou Ch'ü-fei). However, a significant part of the book came from information Zhao gathered from foreign and Chinese traders. As he himself had not travelled overseas, the information he collected is necessarily secondhand, unlike other works such as Daoyi Zhilüe written by Wang Dayuan of the Yuan Dynasty who had travelled overseas to observe other countries at firsthand. Nevertheless, the book contains valuable information on various countries and traded products of the 13th century to modern scholars.

Though the original book was lost, extracts were found in other compilations and annals, and its content was also incorporated into the 15th century Yongle Encyclopedia. Extracts from the Yongle Encyclopedia were then recompiled by Li Diaoyuan (李調元) for inclusion in his collection known as Han Hai (函海) in 1781.

== Content ==
The book is divided into two volumes. The first volume gives a description of various countries and the customs of the local people, the second volume provides information on trade goods available from those countries. Some of the information given in the book are fanciful tales, for example the description of the giant bird of Madagascar as being so big that it can swallow a camel whole, and he may have incorporated inaccurate information from other Chinese written sources (for example, the tale of the giant bird of Madagascar may have come from Lingwai Daida), but much of his own sources appear to be generally accurate.

=== Volume 1 ===
In volume 1, 58 countries and regions are given.

The countries recorded include places and kingdoms in South East Asia, such as Jiaozhi (交趾, northern Vietnam), Champa (占城), Chenla (眞臘, here referring to the Khmer Empire), Langkasuka (凌牙斯加), Sanfoqi (三佛齊, Palembang), Java (闍婆), Kediri), Bagan (蒲甘, Burma), and Mayi (麻逸, the Philippines). Japan, Korea and Taiwan in East Asia, and countries in the Indian subcontinent such as Huchala (胡茶辣, Gujarat), Nanpi (南毗, Malabar) and Zhunian (注輦, Chola) are also mentioned. It also gives more information than previously available in Chinese sources on the Islamic world and their products. The country of Dashi (大食, the Arabs) is described as an extensive realm covering many territories (24 given in the book) with its capital in Egypt, and included Baida (白達, Baghdad); Wengman (甕蠻 Oman); Majia (麻嘉, Mecca); Jicini (吉慈尼, Ghazni) and others.

The book further listed countries and places in Africa, these include Wusili (勿廝離, Egypt) and its city of Egentuo (遏根陀, Alexandria), Bipaluo (弼琶囉, Berbera), Zhongli (中理, Somalia), Cengba (層拔, Zanzibar), Binouye (Tunisia and the Tripoli region in Libya), and Tuopandi (駞盤地, Damietta in Egypt). In this book, he described places such as the famed Lighthouse of Alexandria:

The country of O-kön-t'o (Alexandria) belongs to Wu-ssï-li (Egypt). According to tradition, in olden times a stranger, Tsu-ko-ni (Alexander the Great) by name, built on the shore of the sea a great tower under which the earth was dug out and two rooms were made, well connected and very well secreted. In one vault was grain, in the other were arms. The tower was two hundred chang high. Four horses abreast could ascend to two-thirds of its height. In the centre of the building was a great well connecting with the big river ... On the summit there was a wondrous great mirror; if war-ships of other countries made a sudden attack, the mirror detected them beforehand, and the troops were ready in time for duty.

— Zhao Rukuo, translation by Hirth and Rockhill

The furthest western state described is Mulanpi (木蘭皮, Al-Murabitun) which included southern Spain. The Mediterranean island of Sicily (斯加里野, Sijialiye) is also mentioned.

=== Volume 2 ===
In volume 2, 47 products were listed, 22 of which came from Central Asia and Africa. Zhao gave information on the various traded products of the early 13th century, for example, on the origin of frankincense (ruxiang) being traded into China from Arabia (Dashi):

"Ruxiang or xunluxiang comes from the three Dashi countries of Maloba (Murbat), Shihe (Shihr), and Nufa (Zufar), from the depths of the remotest mountains. The tree which yields this drug may generally be compared to the pine tree. Its trunk is notched with a hatchet, upon which the resin flows out, and, when hardened, turns into incense, which is gathered and made into lumps. It is transported on elephants to the Dashi (on the coast), who then load it upon their ships to exchange it for other commodities in Sanfoqi. This is the reason why it is commonly collected at and known as a product of Sanfoqi."

== Translations ==
An annotated partial English translation was published in 1911 by Friedrich Hirth and William W. Rockhill.

A new annotated translation of Volume 1, illustrated with maps and images, was published digitally by Shao-yun Yang in 2020.

== See also ==
- Daoyi Zhilüe
- Lingwai Daida
