= Chiping, Liaocheng =

Chiping 茌平区 Chihping
- District
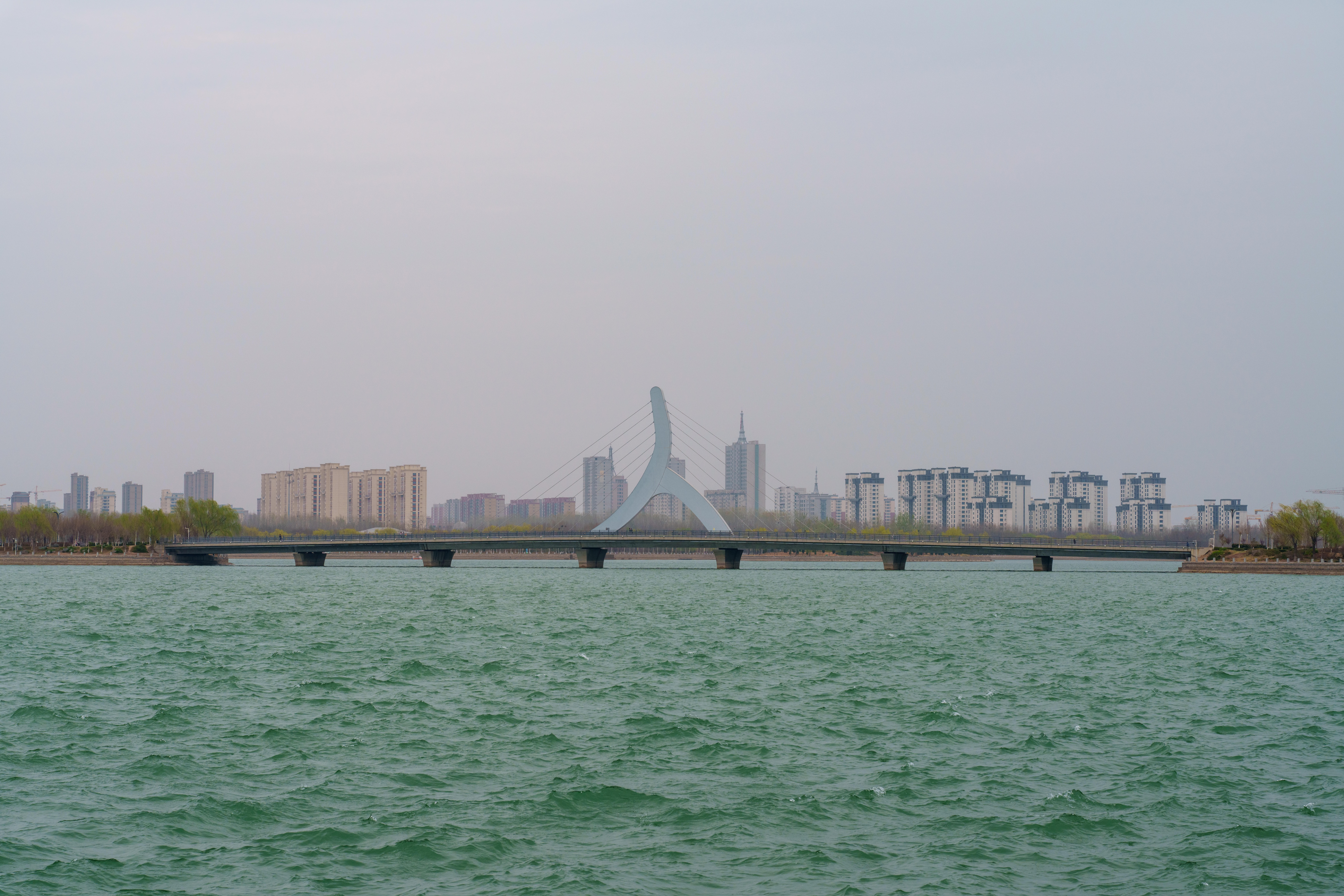
- Jinniu Lake

- Location of the seat in Shandong
- Coordinates: 36.581°N 116.255°E
- Country: People's Republic of China
- Province: Shandong
- Prefecture-level city: Liaocheng

Area
  - Total: 1,003 km^{2} (387 sq mi)

Population (2019)
  - Total: 545,500
  - Density: 543.9/km^{2} (1,409/sq mi)
- Time zone: UTC+8 (China Standard)
- Postal code: 252100

Chiping District (Chinese: 茌平区; pinyin: Chípíng Qū) is a district in Liaocheng City, northwestern Shandong province, People's Republic of China. It is 120 kilometres (75 mi) west of Jinan City, the provincial capital.

The population was 565,756 in 1999.

== Administrative divisions ==
As of 2012, this District is divided to 2 subdistricts, 6 towns and 8 townships.

Subdistricts

- Zhenxing Subdistrict (振兴街道)
- Xinfa Subdistrict (信发街道)

Towns

- Lepingpu (乐平铺镇)
- Fengguantun (冯官屯镇)
- Caitun (菜屯镇)
- Boping (博平镇)
- Dulangkou (杜郎口镇)
- Hantun (韩屯镇)

Townships

- Hanji Township (韩集乡)
- Guangping Township (广平乡)
- Hutun Township (胡屯乡)
- Wenchen Township (温陈乡)
- Jiazhai Township (贾寨乡)
- Yangguantun Township (杨官屯乡)
- Hongguantun Township (洪官屯乡)
- Xiaozhuang Township (肖庄乡)

== Transport ==
- Chipingnan railway station

== Climate ==
Climate data for Chiping, elevation 30 m (98 ft), (1991–2020 normals, extremes 1981–2010)
Month	Jan	Feb	Mar	Apr	May	Jun	Jul	Aug	Sep	Oct	Nov	Dec	Year
Record high °C (°F)	18.0 (64.4)	21.7 (71.1)	28.1 (82.6)	32.0 (89.6)	38.6 (101.5)	41.8 (107.2)	41.8 (107.2)	36.3 (97.3)	36.1 (97.0)	33.2 (91.8)	26.3 (79.3)	17.8 (64.0)	41.8 (107.2)
Mean daily maximum °C (°F)	4.1 (39.4)	8.1 (46.6)	14.4 (57.9)	20.9 (69.6)	26.4 (79.5)	31.7 (89.1)	32.0 (89.6)	30.4 (86.7)	27.1 (80.8)	21.2 (70.2)	12.6 (54.7)	5.7 (42.3)	19.6 (67.2)
Daily mean °C (°F)	−1.5 (29.3)	2.1 (35.8)	8.2 (46.8)	14.7 (58.5)	20.4 (68.7)	25.6 (78.1)	27.1 (80.8)	25.6 (78.1)	20.9 (69.6)	14.8 (58.6)	6.9 (44.4)	0.4 (32.7)	13.8 (56.8)
Mean daily minimum °C (°F)	−5.8 (21.6)	−2.7 (27.1)	2.7 (36.9)	8.9 (48.0)	14.5 (58.1)	19.9 (67.8)	23.0 (73.4)	21.7 (71.1)	16.0 (60.8)	9.6 (49.3)	2.3 (36.1)	−3.8 (25.2)	8.9 (48.0)
Record low °C (°F)	−22.3 (−8.1)	−18.0 (−0.4)	−10.3 (13.5)	−2.2 (28.0)	4.1 (39.4)	9.6 (49.3)	15.9 (60.6)	13.0 (55.4)	4.1 (39.4)	−3.6 (25.5)	−17.1 (1.2)	−18.9 (−2.0)	−22.3 (−8.1)
Average precipitation mm (inches)	3.8 (0.15)	8.6 (0.34)	11.0 (0.43)	33.5 (1.32)	55.6 (2.19)	72.7 (2.86)	152.5 (6.00)	149.3 (5.88)	51.9 (2.04)	30.9 (1.22)	19.4 (0.76)	5.2 (0.20)	594.4 (23.39)
Average precipitation days (≥ 0.1 mm)	1.8	3.2	3.0	5.2	6.5	7.4	11.2	9.7	6.4	5.4	4.2	2.6	66.6
Average snowy days	2.7	2.8	0.7	0.1	0	0	0	0	0	0	0.9	2.0	9.2
Average relative humidity (%)	62	59	56	61	66	63	78	83	77	68	67	65	67
Mean monthly sunshine hours	146.1	149.6	205.2	226.7	249.3	223.5	184.5	182.5	187.1	181.7	149.5	143.9	2,229.6
Percentage possible sunshine	47	48	55	57	57	51	42	44	51	53	49	48	50
Source: China Meteorological Administration
