= Caitun =

Caitun 菜屯镇
- Town
- Location in Shandong Caitun (China)
- Coordinates: 36°43′44″N 116°01′09″E
- Country: People's Republic of China
- Province: Shandong
- Prefecture-level city: Liaocheng
- County: Chiping
- Time zone: UTC+8 (China Standard)

Caitun (Chinese: 菜屯镇) is a town in Chiping County, Liaocheng, in western Shandong province, China.
