= Duke of Fan =

Two different dukedoms in historical China

The Duke of Fan refers to the titular heads of two different dukedoms in historical China, both romanized in the same way in Hanyu Pinyin.

- Duke of Fán (Chinese: 樊公; pinyin: Fán Gōng)
- Duke of Fàn (Chinese: 范公; pinyin: Fàn Gōng)

While two separate clans derived their surnames from these titles, they were also awarded to others as well.

== Background ==
=== Western Zhou dynasty ===
Zhong Shanpu was a judge in the reign of King Xuan of Zhou (r. 827–782 BCE). Zhong was instrumental in the northern expansion of the Zhou dynasty, and was awarded with the title Duke of Fán (South west of Ji Yuan in Henan Province). His descendants assumed the surname of Fan (樊).

=== Jin state ===
Shi Hui (士会), great grandson of Du Bo, was an army general, and became the Commander in Chief of the Jin kingdom (632–403 BCE). He was rewarded for defeating the neighboring tribes, and given the title the Duke of Sui (Jiexiu in Shanxi) and the Duke of Fan (south east of Fan in Henan). In reference to his title as Duke he is also known as Sui Hui (随会), or Fan Hui (范会), and his descendants assumed one of the following last names, Fan (范), Sui (随), or Shi (士). The Fan Family is the largest and most prominent clan.

=== Cao Wei dynasty ===
Cao Jun the a son of Cao Cao, a warlord who rose to power in the late Eastern Han dynasty was enfeoffed as the Marquis of Fan (樊侯) in 217. He died in 219 and was honored with the posthumous title "Duke An of Fan" (樊安公) in 221 by his half-brother Cao Pi became the first emperor of the Cao Wei state after usurping the throne from Emperor Xian, the last emperor of the Han dynasty. Cao Jun's son and heir, Cao Kang (曹抗), was also given the title of the Duke of Fán.
