= Western Expedition =

Military campaign of the Taiping Heavenly Kingdom

- Part of Taiping Rebellion
Date	May 19, 1853 – March 1856
Location	China
Result	Taiping victory
Territorial changes	Taiping occupies most of Anhui and Jiangxi, but fail to retake Hunan and Hubei

Belligerents
Qing dynasty	Taiping Heavenly Kingdom

Commanders and leaders
Jiang Zhongyuan †	Hu Yiguang; Lai Hanying; Zeng Tianyang; Wei Jun; Shi Zhenxiang

The Western Expedition (Chinese: 太平天國西征) was a campaign by the Taiping Heavenly Kingdom against the Qing dynasty during the Taiping Rebellion.

== Planning ==
The Western Expedition was conceived by Yang Xiuqing shortly after the fall of Nanjing. It was intended to march along the Yangtze River and ultimately meet with the concurrent Northern Expedition in Sichuan. The Taiping believed that such a pincer movement could capture all of western and northern China. It was also intended to, in conjunction with the Northern Expedition, relieve pressure on the Taiping's holdings caused by the Qing's formation of the Northern and Southern Fronts.

== Execution ==
The Western Expedition left Nanjing on May 19, 1853. Less than a month later, it recaptured the city of Anqing on June 10, 1853. At that point, the expedition split into three separate armies. The first army, led by Hu Yiguang, traveled north to conquer Anhui. The second, led by Lai Hanying, traveled south to conquer Jiangxi. The third, led by Zeng Tianyang, attacked a number of cities south of the Yangtze. Hu Yinguang successfully captured Luzhou (modern Hefei, Anhui) the government's new capital of Anhui, on January 14, 1854. In doing so, Hu defeated a small force led by Jiang Zhongyuan, who subsequently committed suicide. Lai was less successful, as he was unable to take Nanchang, Jiangxi's capital. Lai was replaced by Wei Jun and Shi Zhenxiang, who moved into Hubei and Hunan, ultimately capturing Xiangtan on April 24, 1854. The Western Expedition succeeded in capturing Pengze, Hukou, and Jiujiang. It also defeated Zeng Guofan in battle, leading him to attempt suicide on two separate occasions. The Western Expedition ended in March 1856 when it was recalled to Nanjing to reinforce the besieged city.

== Analysis ==
The Western Expedition had limited success. Although a number of key cities within a fertile recruiting ground had fallen, the Western Expedition was ultimately unable to capture the whole of western China or the upper Yangtze. The Taiping's original, rapid drive transformed into a push-and-pull struggle, which provided the Qing with time to recover and build-up new armies with new leaders who ultimately doomed the rebellion.

In 1856 Shi Dakai launches a second western expedition destined for Sichuan. This other campaign also fails when he surrenders in 1863.
