= Lin Fengxiang =

Military leader in Taiping Rebellion

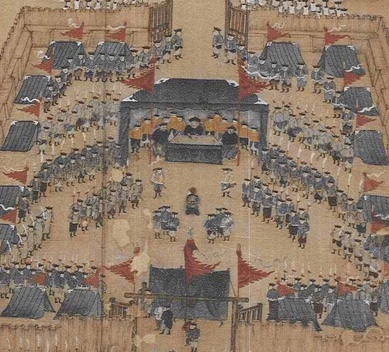
- Capture of Lin Fengxiang, Fengxiang is likely the kneeling figure in the centre
- Died: 1855; Qing Empire
- Military career
- Allegiance: Taiping Heavenly Kingdom
- Conflicts: Northern Expedition

Lin Fengxiang was from Gui County, Guangxi, China. Originally an imperial guard in 1852, he rose to the rank of commander during the Taiping's march through Hunan. In Hubei, he was promoted to deputy chancellor of the Heaven Department. Along with Li Kaifang, Lin lead the Taiping vanguard during the march toward Nanking and occupied Yangzhou in April 1853. Both would also lead the ill-fated Northern Expedition. Lin was captured on March 7, 1855 in Lizhen, Zhili.
