= Lingwai Daida =

12th-century CHinese geographical treatise

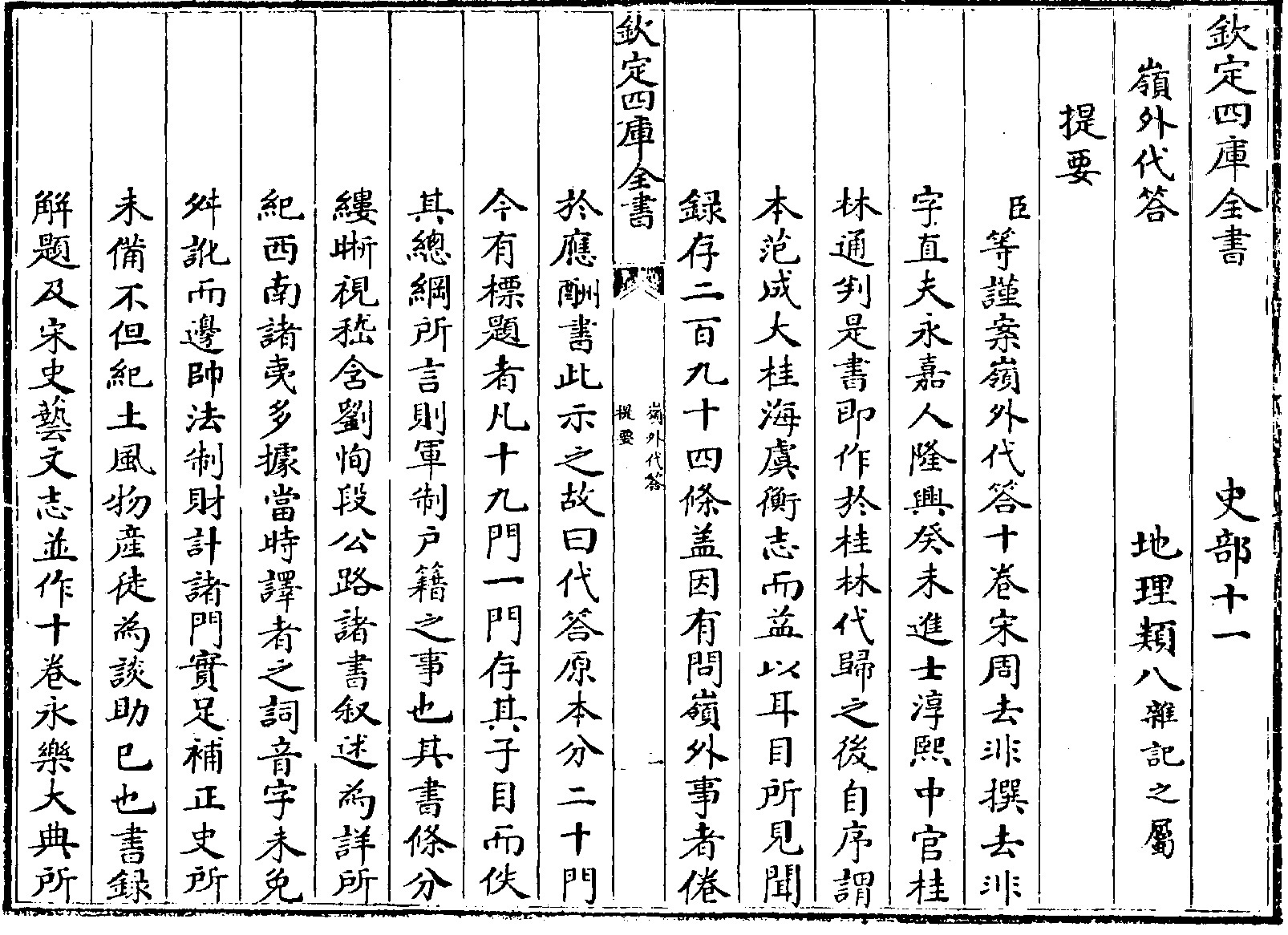
Introduction of Lingwai Daida in Siku Quanshu

Lingwai Daida (Chinese: 嶺外代答; pinyin: Lǐngwài Dàidá; Wade–Giles: Lingwai Taita), variously translated as Representative Answers from the Region beyond the Mountains, Notes Answering [Curious Questions] from the land beyond the Pass or other similar titles, is a 12th-century geographical treatise written by Zhou Qufei (Chinese: 周去非; pinyin: Zhōu Qùfēi; Wade–Giles: Chou Ch'ü-fei). It contains information on the geography, history, social custom and economy of territories of southern China, Guangxi in particular. More significantly it also provides knowledge of distant lands in China during the Song dynasty, and includes descriptions of oversea states as far away as Africa and southern Spain.

== Background ==
The book was written in 1178 by Zhou Qufei. Zhou based his book largely on information he had gathered himself and other previous published works, particularly a book written by Fan Chengda. He worked for 6 years in Guangxi; and had worked as an assistant sub-prefect in Guilin, Guangxi. In Guilin, Zhou served for a time under Fan Chengda who wrote a book on the southern region of China, Guihai yuheng zhi (桂海虞衡志, "Well-balanced Records of Guihai"). Zhou received a copy of Fan's book while he was revising his own book to finish it, and he quoted extensively from Fan's work. The book also includes quotes from Huanghua Sida Ji (皇華四達記) by the Tang dynasty geographer Jia Dan.

Zhou had also worked as an Educational Commissioner in Qinzhou, a port in Guangxi, where he had the opportunity to question traders, sailors as well as interpreters for foreign merchants. He added the information on distance lands he had gathered in two chapters of the book he wrote.

The original book is lost, and the current version was recompiled from entries in the Yongle Encyclopedia.

== Content ==
There are ten chapters in the book, which concentrates mostly on the history, geography, custom and products of Guangxi, and it also contains information on southwest China, the Leizhou Peninsula of Guangdong as well as Hainan Island. It remains today an important reference for Guangxi of the Song era.

Of particular interest are the two chapters that included descriptions of countries outside of China as well as their traded products. Some of these are among the earliest accounts of distant countries as far away as Africa in Chinese records. As the information on foreign countries was gathered secondhand, the accounts given in the book contain some exaggerations, inaccuracies and fanciful tales, but it gives a fairly accurate configuration of land and sea stretching from Korea to Spain.

Some of the entries in the book were incorporated or adapted into Zhao Rugua's book Zhu Fan Zhi, for example this description of Mulanpi (木蘭皮, Al-Murabitun) that covered part of northwest Africa (Morocco) and southern Spain, and it includes an early Chinese reference to northern Europe:

The country of Mu-lan-p'i is to the west of the Ta-shi (Arabs) country. There is a great sea, and to the west of this sea there are countless countries, but Mu-lan-p'i is the one country which is visited by the big ships of the Ta-shi. Putting to sea from T'o-pan-ti (Damietta) in the country of the Ta-shi, after sailing due west for full an hundred days, one reaches this country. A single one of these (big) ships of theirs carries several thousand men, and on board they have stores of wine and provisions, as well as weaving looms. If one speaks of big ships, there are none so big as those of Mu-lan-p'i. At the present day when people say 'a Mu-lan ship', is it not simply saying that it is a big one?

The products of this country are extraordinary; the grains of wheat are two inches long, the melons six feet round. Rice and wheat are kept in silos for tens of years without spoiling. Among the native products are foreign sheep which are several feet high and have tails as big as a fan. (Note: This may be a confusion with the Ethiopian broad-tailed sheep which were not found in northwest Africa or Spain.) In the spring-time they slit open their bellies and take out some tens of catties of fat, after which they sew them up again, and the sheep live on; if the fat were not removed, (the animal) would swell up and die.

There is a tradition in this country to the effect that if one travels by land (from Mu-lan-p'i) two hundred days journey, the days are only six hours long. (Note: This is a reference to northern Europe, which may be called the Land of Darkness by medieval Arab geographers and travellers.) In autumn if the west wind arises, men and beasts must at once drink to keep alive, and if they are not quick enough about it they die of thirst.

— Zhou Qufei, translation by Friedrich Hirth and William W. Rockhill

== Translations ==
A German translation, Das Ling-wai-tai-ta von Chou Ch'ü-fei: Eine Landeskunde Südchinas aus dem 12. Jahrhundert, by Almut Netolitzky was published in 1977. An annotated English translation of the geographical chapters by the Italian scholar Victoria Almonte was published in 2020, as The Historical Value of the Work Lingwai Daida by Zhou Qufei (Rome, Italy: Aracne, 2020).

== See also ==
- Zhu Fan Zhi
- Daoyi Zhilüe
