= Zhao Rukuo =

Chinese official and writer

Zhao Rukuo (simplified Chinese: 赵汝适; traditional Chinese: 趙汝适; pinyin: Zhào Rǔkuò; 1170–1231), also romanised as Zhao Rugua, Chau Ju-kua, or as Zhao Rushi, was a Chinese government official and writer during the Song dynasty. He wrote a two-volume book titled Zhu Fan Zhi. The book deals with the world known to the Chinese in the twelfth and thirteenth centuries; the first volume is a list of foreign places with descriptions of each place and the customs of its local people. The second volume is a catalog of trade goods.

== Biography ==
Zhao was a member of the Song dynasty imperial clan, an eighth-generation descendant of Emperor Taizong in the lineage through the younger brother of Emperor Zhenzong.

He was born in Tiantai County in Taizhou, Zhejiang in 1170. He began his career as a bureaucrat in 1190, and rose through the ranks. In 1224, he was appointed the supervisor of maritime trade (市舶司, shibosi) in Quanzhou, Fujian province. He also held the posts of prefect for Quanzhou as well the southern administrator. He died in 1231 and was buried in Linhai County in Zhejiang.

== Zhu Fan Zhi ==
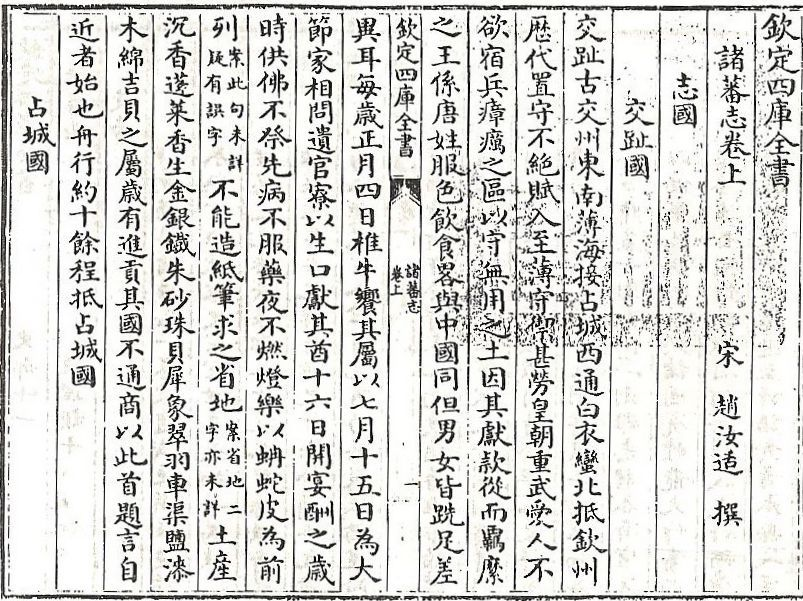
A page from Zhu Fan Zhi

While working in Fujian, Zhao noted the commodities from various countries, and he had the opportunity to meet foreign merchants from whom he gathered information on various countries around the world. He also studied maps, and with the information that he collected, he wrote the book, which he finished around 1225. Many entries of Zhu Fan Zhi take information from an older work from 1178, Lingwai Daida by another geographer, Zhou Qufei (Chinese: 周去非; pinyin: Zhōu Qùfēi; Wade–Giles: Chou Ch'ü-fei). However, a significant part of the book came from what he gathered from foreign and Chinese traders.

Although Zhao had not travelled outside of China, the book contained valuable information on various countries in the thirteenth century for modern scholars. The countries ranged from those nearby such as Japan, to the various kingdoms in South East Asia, such as Srivijaya and Brunei, places in India, to the Islamic heartland of Arabia and Mecca, as well as countries in Africa, and as far as southern Spain.

== See also ==
- Friedrich Hirth
