= Lingling Fan =

Power engineer

Lingling Fan is a power engineer who is currently a professor of electrical engineering at the University of South Florida. Fan specializing in the dynamics, system identification, and control theory of electrical grids and electric power conversion, and especially on the integration into these systems of inverter-based resources connected to variable renewable energy sources such as wind power and solar power.

== Education and career ==
Fan is originally from a small village on the coast of East China, the daughter of a teacher and a hydraulic engineer. She studied electrical engineering at Southeast University in Nanjing, earning bachelor's and master's degrees in 1994 and 1997 respectively. She came to the US as a doctoral student at West Virginia University, where she completed her Ph.D. in 2001.

After six years working for the industry at Midwest ISO, a nonprofit energy transmission organization based in St. Paul, Minnesota, Lingling joined North Dakota State University as an assistant professor in 2007. She moved to the University of South Florida in 2009, and is a full professor there.

In 2020, she became editor-in-chief of IEEE Electrification Magazine.

In 2026, she became editor-in-chief of IEEE Open Access Journal of Power and Energy.

== Books ==
Fan is the author or coauthor of books including:

- Modeling and Analysis of Doubly Fed Induction Generator Wind Energy Systems (with Zhixin Miao, Academic Press, 2015)
- Control and Dynamics in Power Systems and Microgrids (CRC Press, 2017)
- Weak Grid Integration of Inverter-Based Resources: Challenges and Control Solutions (with Zhixin Miao, Wiley-IEEE Press, 2025)

== Recognition ==
Fan was elected as an IEEE Fellow in 2022, "for contributions to stability analysis and control of inverter-based resources".

Fan was the recipient of the 2025 IEEE Power and Energy Society Wanda Reder Pioneer in Power Award, "for leadership in technical innovations in power grid stability analysis and dedicated services to IEEE PES publications and education".
