= Wuchang, Wuhan =

Wuchang 武昌区 Wu-Chang
- District
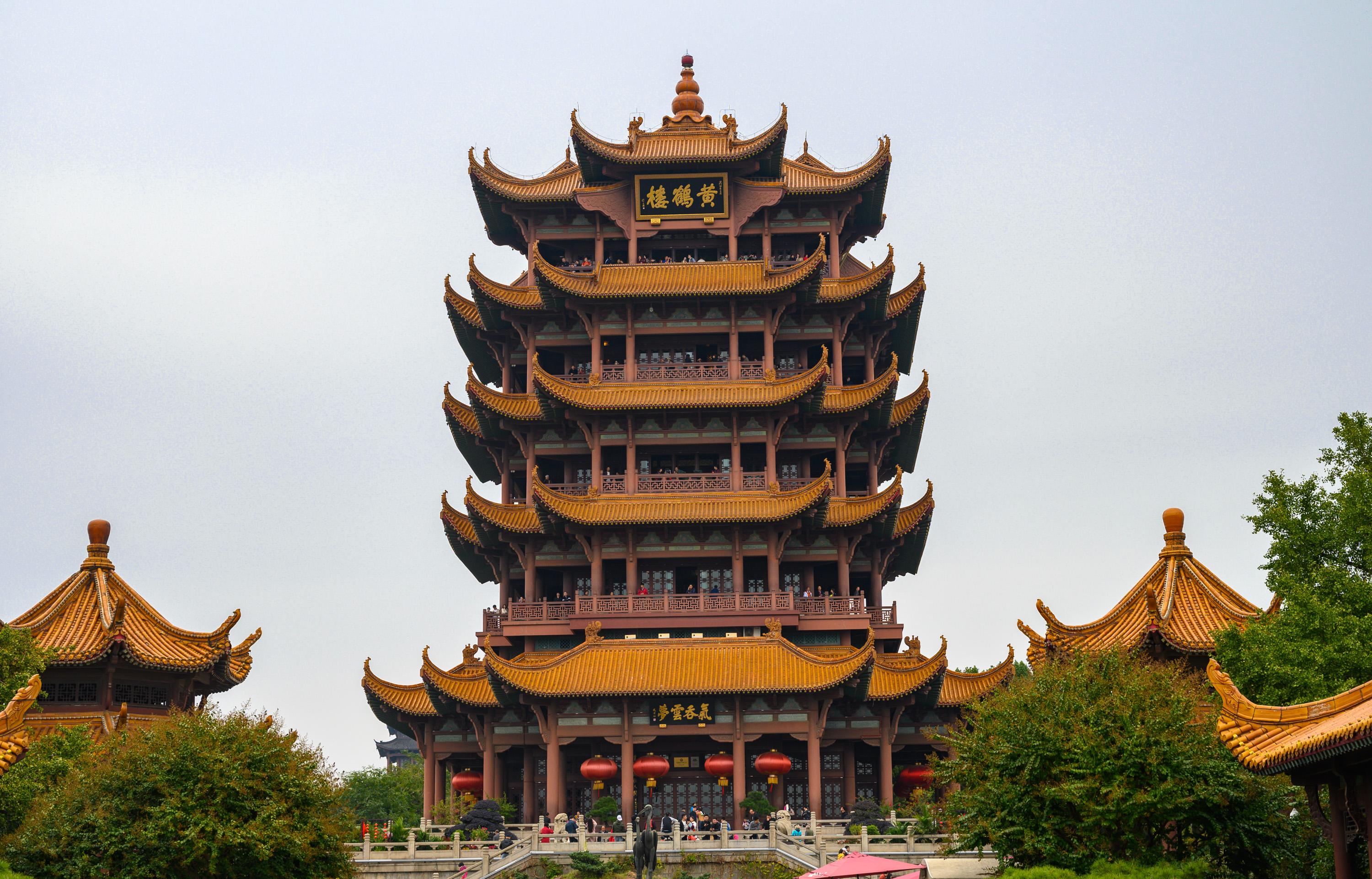
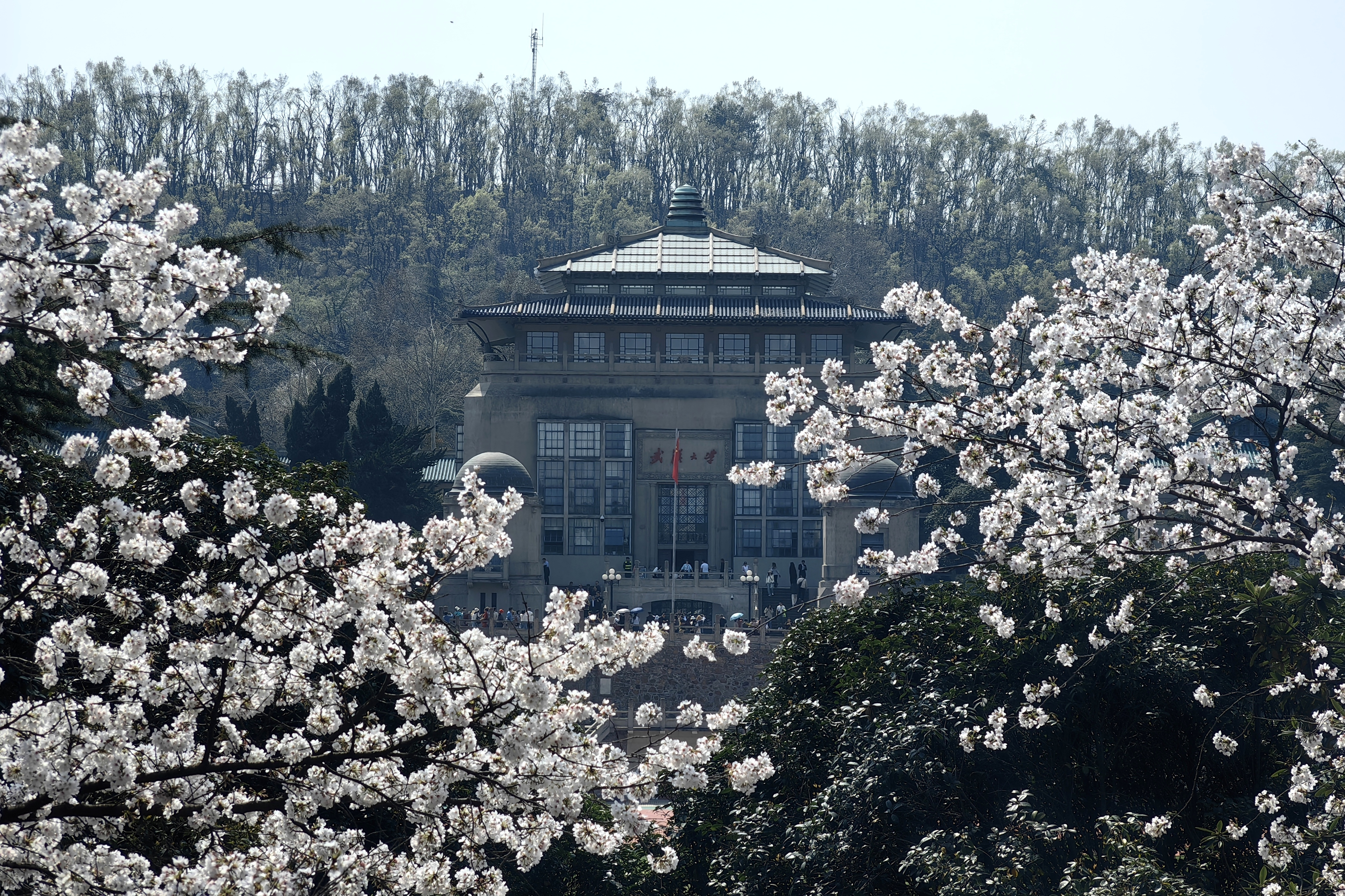
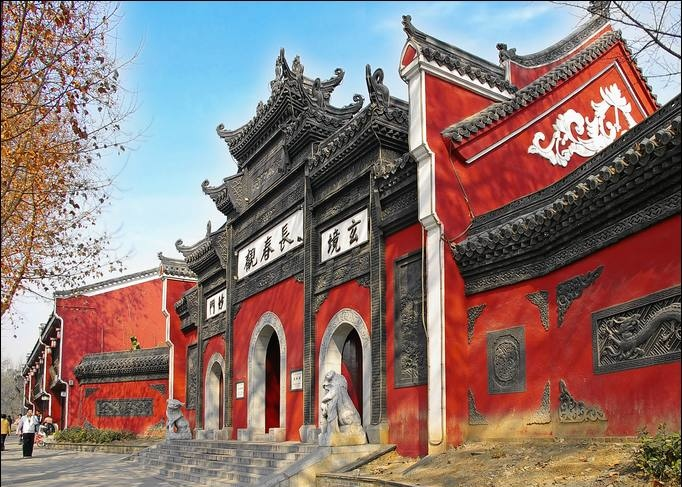
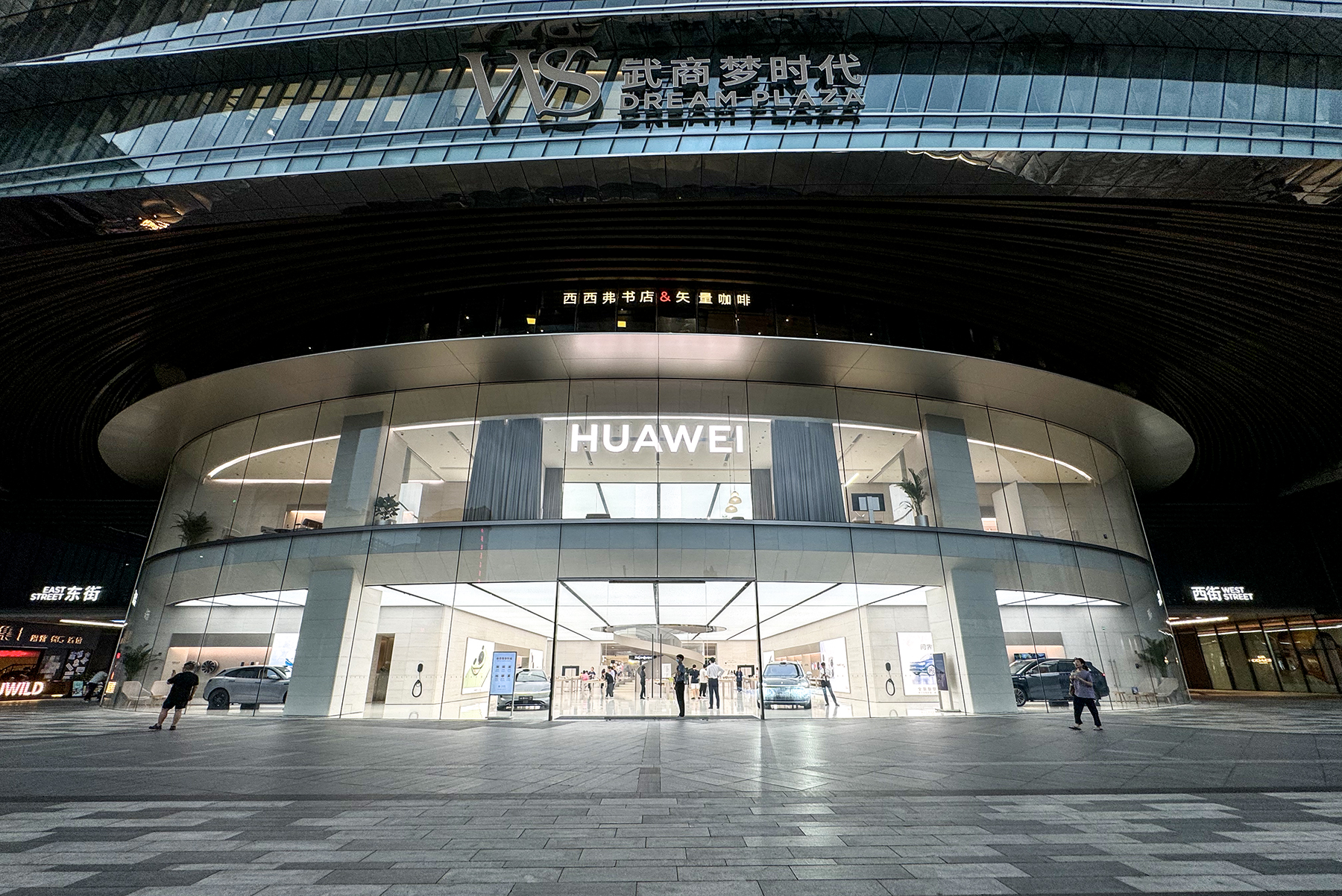
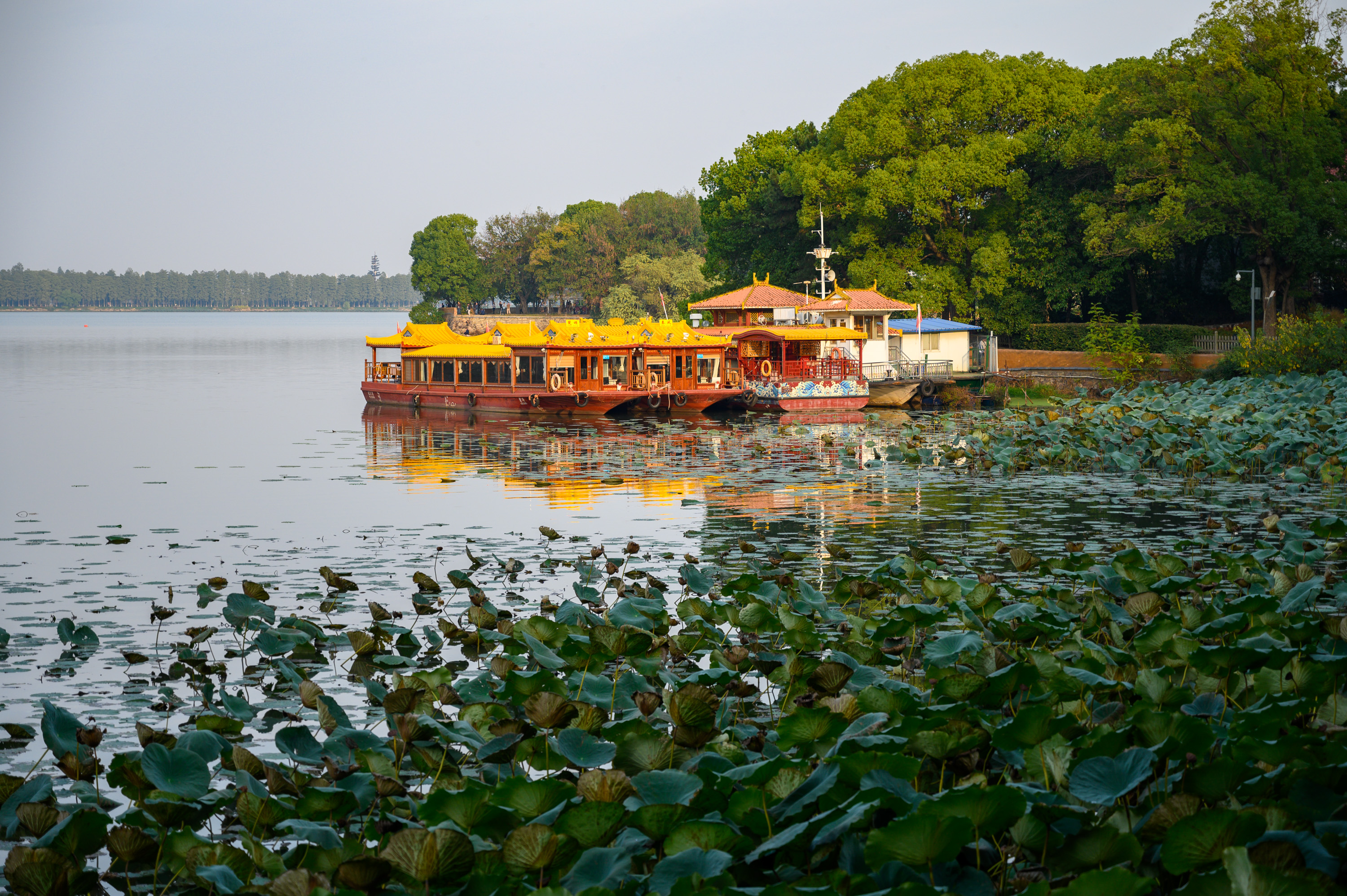
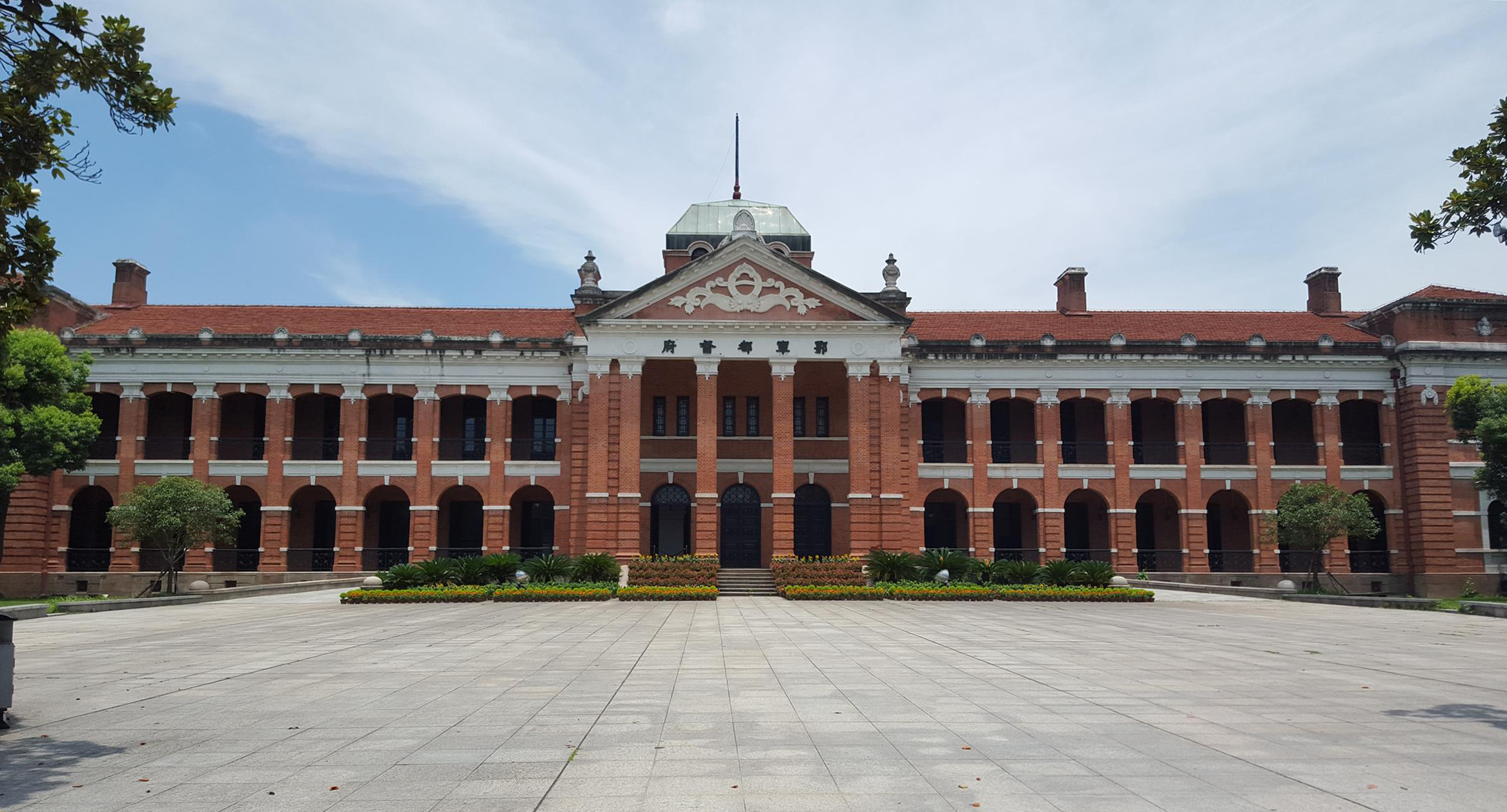
- Yellow Crane Tower Wuhan University Changchun Taoist Temple WS Dream Plaza East Lake Wuchang Uprising Museum

- Location in Hubei
- Coordinates: 30°33′43″N 114°20′25″E
- Country: People's Republic of China
- Province: Hubei
- Sub-provincial city: Wuhan

Area
  - Total: 87.42 km^{2} (33.75 sq mi)

Population (2020)
  - Total: 1,102,188
  - Density: 12,610/km^{2} (32,650/sq mi)
- Time zone: UTC+8 (China Standard)
- Website: 武昌区政府门户网站 (translation: Wuchang District Government Web Portal (in Simplified Chinese)

Wuchang, Wuhan
- Traditional Chinese: 武昌
Transcriptions
Standard Mandarin
- Hanyu Pinyin: Wǔchāng
- Gwoyeu Romatzyh: Wuuchang
- Wade–Giles: Wu^{3}-ch‘ang^{1}

Wuchang is one of 13 urban districts of the prefecture-level city of Wuhan, the capital of Hubei Province, China. It is the oldest of the three cities that merged into modern-day Wuhan, and stood on the right (southeastern) bank of the Yangtze River, opposite the mouth of the Han River. The two other cities, Hanyang and Hankou, were on the left (northwestern) bank, separated from each other by the Han River.

The name "Wuchang" remains in common use for the part of urban Wuhan south of the Yangtze River. Administratively, however, it is split between several districts of the City of Wuhan. The historic center of Wuchang lies within the modern Wuchang District, which has an area of 82.4 square kilometres (31.8 sq mi) and a population of 1,102,188. Other parts of what is colloquially known as Wuchang are within Hongshan District (south and south-east) and Qingshan District (north-east). Presently, on the right bank of the Yangtze, it borders the districts of Qingshan (for a very small section) to the northeast and Hongshan to the east and south; on the opposite bank it borders Jiang'an, Jianghan and Hanyang.

On 10 October 1911, the New Army stationed in the city started the Wuchang Uprising, a turning point of the Xinhai Revolution that overthrew the Qing dynasty and established the Republic of China.

== History ==
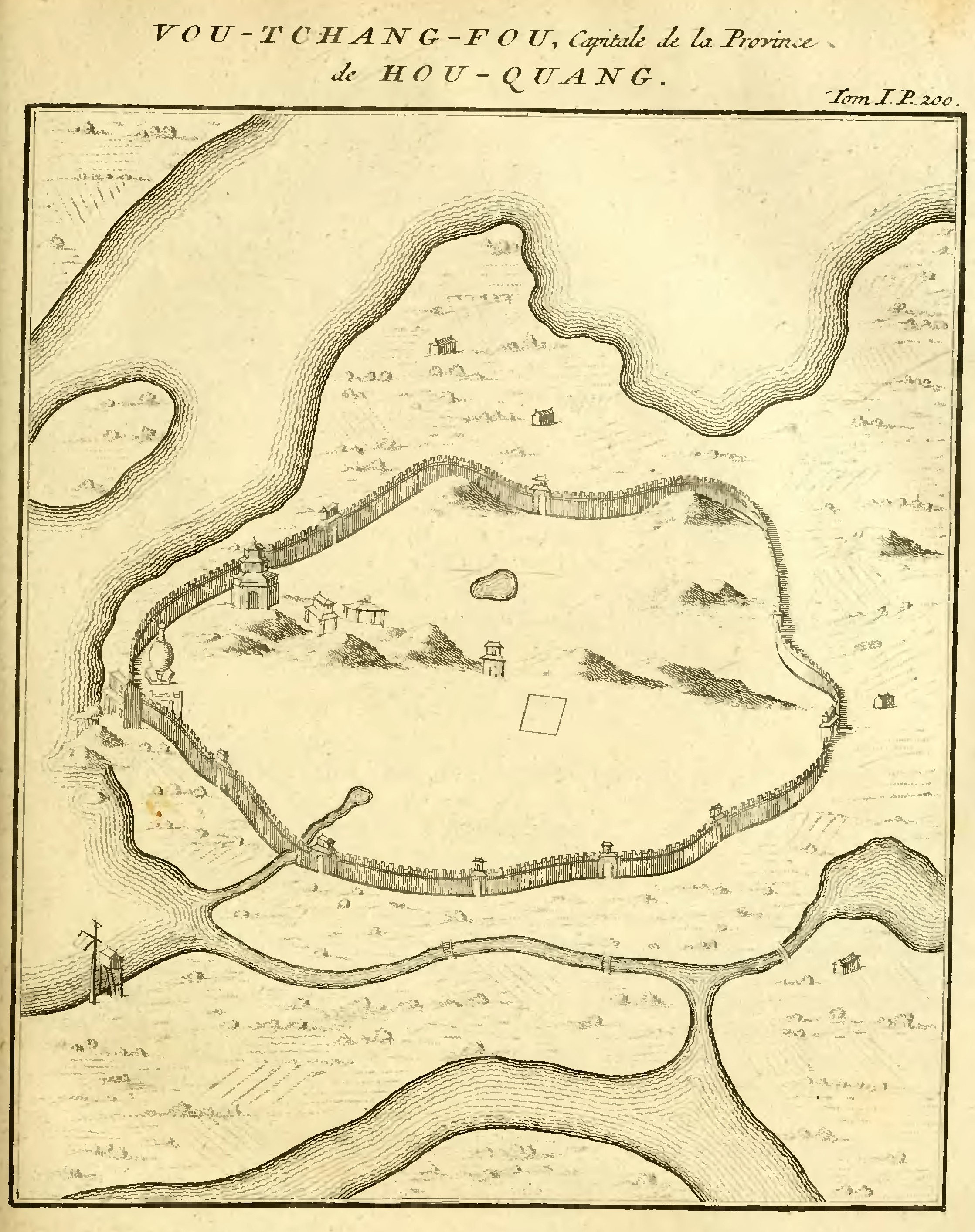
The map of "Vou-chang-fou" in Du Halde's 1736 Description of China, based on reports from the Jesuit mission

=== The old Wuchang county ===
In 221, warlord Sun Quan moved the capital of Eastern Wu from Gong'an county, Jingzhou (northwest of present-day Gong'an county, Hubei) to È county (in present-day Ezhou City), and renamed È to Wuchang (literally prospering from military, regarding its logistics role of the military bases established before the Battle of Red Cliffs). Later in the year Cao Pi proclaimed himself the emperor of Cao Wei. Sun Quan declared independence in the following year, and started to build forts and palaces in Wuchang. Sun Quan proclaimed himself the emperor of Eastern Wu in 229, and moved the capital to Jianye. Sun Hao, the emperor of Eastern Wu between 264 and 280, moved the capital back to Wuchang in 265. In 589, the Wuchang commandery was abolished and the Wuchang county was transferred to a new commandery named Ezhou (headquartered in present-day Wuchang District), and remained in the administration since then.

=== The present day Wuchang town ===
The Wuchang commandery was set up when È was renamed to Wuchang, and included six counties. In 223 the commandery was renamed to Jiangxia, and the capital of the commandery moved to Xiakou (in present-day Wuchang town). The name of the town was switched back and forth between Wuchang and Jiangxia several times in the following centuries. The present-day version of Wuying Pagoda, the oldest standing architecture in Hubei Province, was built around the time of fall of the Southern Song Dynasty. After 1301, the Wuchang prefecture, headquartered in the town, became the capital of Hubei province.

During the Taiping Rebellion, Wuchang and the surrounding area changed hands several times after the Taiping capture of the city in the Battle of Wuchang (1852).

At the end of the Qing Empire, the Wuchang Prefecture (武昌府, then transcribed as 'Ou-tchang-fou') was the capital of the combined provinces of Hubei and Hunan, called the 'two Hu' or Huguang Viceroyalty. It was the seat of the provincial government of Huguang, at the head of which was a viceroy of Huguang. Next to Nanjing and Guangzhou, it was one of the most important vice-royalties in the empire.

It possessed an arsenal and a mint. The provincial government established ironworks for the manufacture of rails and other railway material. As the works did not pay under official management, they were transferred to the director-general of railways. Wuchang was not open to foreign trade and residence, but a considerable number of missionaries, both Roman Catholic and Protestant, lived within the walls. The native population was estimated at 800,000 around 1911, including cities on both banks. At that time, Wuchang was an important junction on the trunk railway from Beijing to Guangzhou; and was on the route of the Sichuan railway.

In Wuchang on October 10, 1911, a revolt broke out against the Qing Dynasty. This event, now called the Wuchang Uprising and celebrated as Double Ten Day, was the catalyst that started the Xinhai Revolution, which led to the development of the Republic of China.

In 1912, the Wuchang prefecture was abolished and a new Wuchang county (just next to the Wuchang county in the Ezhou city) was created. In 1926 the Wuchang town was promoted to a city, and merged with Hankou and Hanyang to form a new city named Wuhan.

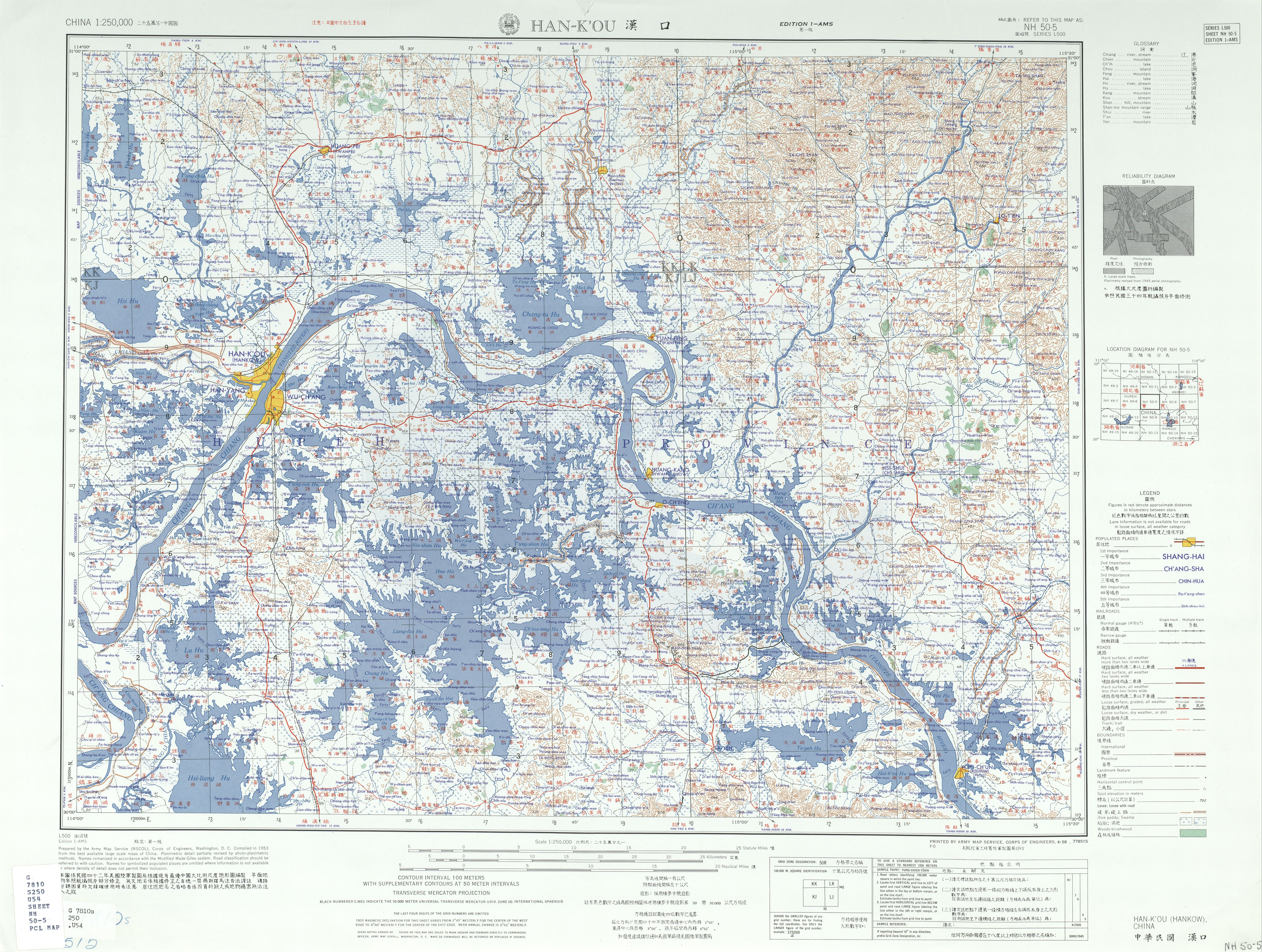
Map including Wuchang (labeled WU-CH'ANG 武昌) (1953)

After 1949, the more urban part of the Wuchang County was absorbed into the new Wuhan City and was administratively partitioned into Wuchang, Qingshan and Hongshan districts, while the remaining, mostly rural, southern part retained the name of Wuchang County. In 1995, Wuchang County became Jiangxia District of Wuhan.

== Geography ==
=== Administrative divisions ===
Wuchang District administers:

#	Name	Chinese (S)	Pinyin Romanization
Subdistricts
1	Shidong Subdistrict Rock Cave	石洞街道	Shídòng Jiēdào
2	Yangyuan Subdistrict Yang Garden	杨园街道	Yángyuán Jiēdào
3	Xujiapeng Subdistrict	徐家棚街道	Xūjiāpéng Jiēdào
4	Jiyuqiao Subdistrict	积玉桥街道	Jīyùqiáo Jiēdào
5	Zhonghualu Subdistrict Zhonghua Road	中华路街道	Zhōnghuálù Jiēdào
6	Liangdao Subdistrict	粮道街道	Liángdào Jiēdào
7	Huanghelou Subdistrict Yellow Crane Tower	黄鹤楼街道	Huánghèlóu Jiēdào
8	Ziyang Subdistrict	紫阳街道	Zǐyáng Jiēdào
9	Baishazhou Subdistrict White Sand Islet	白沙洲街道	Báishāzhōu Jiēdào
10	Shouyilu Subdistrict First to Rise in Revolt Road	首义路街道	Shǒuyìlù Jiēdào
11	Zhongnanlu Subdistrict South Central Road	中南路街道	Zhōngnánlù Jiēdào
12	Shuiguohu Subdistrict Fruit Lake	水果湖街道	Shuǐguǒhú Jiēdào
13	Luojiashan Subdistrict Mount Luojia	珞珈山街道	Luòjiāshān Jiēdào
14	Nanhu Subdistrict South Lake	南湖街道	Nánhú Jiēdào
15	Donghu Scenic Area East Lake	东湖风景区街道	Dōnghú Fēngjǐngqū Jiēdào

== Notable people ==
- Saint Francis Regis Clet, one of the Martyr Saints of China, executed in Wuchang in 1840
- Jayne Meadows, American stage, film and television actress

== See also ==
The Wuchang fish (Megalobrama amblycephala; 武昌鱼; 武昌魚; Wǔchāng yú) is named after the town.
