= Fan Chengda =

Chinese writer and scholar (1126–1193)

Fan Chengda (Chinese: 范成大; pinyin: Fàn Chéngdà; Wade–Giles: Fan Ch'eng-ta, 1126–1193), courtesy name Zhineng (致能), was a Chinese geographer, poet, and politician. One of the best-known Chinese poets of the Song Dynasty, he served as a government official, and was an academic authority in geography, especially the southern provinces of China. His written work also falls under the literary category of 'travel record literature' (yóujì wénxué), a narrative and prose style approach to writing about one's travel experiences, which was popular in China during the Song Dynasty. He, along with Yang Wanli, Lu You, and You Mao, are considered to be the "four masters" of Southern Song dynasty poetry. Fàn was also a member of a cadet branch of the elite Fàn family.

== Life and works ==
Fàn's work deals with the traditional themes of the period, including peasant life, Prunus mume, the seasons, Buddhism, and growing old. Fàn was born in Suzhou into a middle-ranking family at a time of conflict between the Southern Song and Jin dynasties. A precocious child, his early studies of classical literature prepared him for a career in the civil service - a career that was temporarily interrupted when his parents died within a few months of each other in 1143, leaving Fàn solely in charge of the family estate. These studies, together with his experiences of working in the fields as a teenager and his interest in Buddhism, provided inspiration for his later poetry.

After a youth of austere poverty, Fàn Chéngdà was able to pass the Imperial Examination and secure the jinshi degree in 1154 AD. Afterwards, he entered a long career in service of the state. During his career he wrote an important geographical treatise known as the Guì Hǎi Yú Héng Zhì. The book focused primarily on the topography of the land and commercial products of China's southern provinces. In this Fàn followed a long geographical literary tradition, continuing from the Shu Jing (Historical Classic) of the 5th century BC, the Huainan Zi of the 2nd century BC, and predating the famous written works by the Ming Dynasty geographer Xu Xiake.

However, his best-known work is a series of sixty poems which he wrote in 1186, following his retirement from his position as a high official at the Southern Song Court. The poems have been translated into English under the name Stone Lake - the location of his retirement villa just outside Suzhou.

== Treatise on mei-flowers ==
One of Fàn's greatest interests was writing about flora and fauna, and he contributed the first writing regarding horticulture in China written specifically about the meihua flower, also known as plum blossoms. He associated the mei-flower with the "gentleman-recluse," a gentleman who still lived a simple farming life. He also believed the meihua was a flower that represented purity as it grew in the wild and was not originally a flower cultivated by people. He associated this purity with himself and his own dreams of escaping the "worldly-dust," a reference to his deep Buddhist beliefs. In addition to his interest in mei-flowers, Fàn also wrote the Treatise on Chrysanthemums.

== Summit to Mount Emei ==
On June 27, 1177, Fàn departed from the city of Chengdu, Sichuan and traveled 100 miles south to Jia county (modern-day Leshan). His focus on this visit was to travel to Mount Emei, a mountain famous for its notoriety in regards to Buddhism. He followed the Min River to Jia county and spent ten days there touring scenic Buddhist sites, first the Colossal Buddha and then Mount Emei. He wrote various diary entries documenting his journey up the mountain. In a diary entry dated 16–20 July 1177, Fàn wrote:

"Moored in Jia county. Most of the people seeing me off have now returned home. Leaving my family on the boated moored below the banks of Jia county, I rode alone towards Emei... It is recorded in Buddhist texts that this is the place where the Bodhisattva Samantabhadra makes his appearance and manifestation."

22 July, he wrote:

"Set out from Emei town. Leaving by the West Gate, we began climbing the mountain and passed the Benevolent Fortune and Universal Security Cloisters, White Stream Manor, and Shu Village Way-Stop. After twelve li came to Dragon Spirit Hall. From here on, mountain torrents ripped and roared; shady forests stood mighty and deep. Took a brief rest at Avatamsaka Cloister. Next we reached the Twin Stream Bridge. The jumbled mountains here huddle together like standing screens. There are two mountains opposite one another, each of which produces a stream. Side by side they flow to the base of the bridge. Their rocky channels are several tens of fathoms deep. With dark waters of deep green hue, the soaring torrents spurt foamy snowcaps as they race beyond the bridges and then pass into a high thicket. Several tens of paces from there the two streams join and then plunge into a great ravine. The waters in the abyss, still and deep, clear and pure, disperse to form rapids... This scene is not something that could be captured in a sketch."

After reaching the White Stream Monastery, he wrote:

"On the road there was a sign that read: 'The World's Great Mount Emei.' Then we reached the White Stream Monastery. Every step along the way from the town to here is nothing but steep hillsides for more than forty li. Only now are we beginning to climb the foothills of the crested peaks."

While resting at White Stream Monastery, he added:

"Spent the night at White Stream Monastery. It was raining heavily, so we could not ascend the mountain. Paid a visit to the bronze statue of the Bodhisattva Samantabhudra. It was cast in Chengdu by imperial decree at the beginning of the dynasty."

24 July 1177:

"It was a clear, beautiful day and so we began our ascent to the upper peak. From here to the Luminous Light Monastery and Seven Treasures Cliff on the peak’s crest is another sixty li. The distance to there from the flat land in the town [below] is probably no less than one hundred li. No longer do we find any stone-step paths. Timbers have been cut and made into a long ladder, which is fastened to the cliff wall. One ascends the mountain by crawling up it. I submit that of all the mountains to be climbed in the empire, none matches this one in danger and height. As strong yeomen supported my sedan-chair in its forced ascent, thirty mountain lads drew it upward while they advanced pulling on a huge rope."

25 July 1177 he reached the summit and wrote:

"Behind all these mountains are the Snow Mountains of the Western Regions. Their jagged and cragged peaks, which seem carved and pared, number upwards to a hundred. With the first light of day their snowy hue is piercing and bright, like glistening silver amid the dazzling and resplendent light of dawn. Since ancient times these snows have never melted. The mountains stretch and sweep into India and other alien lands, for who knows how many thousands of li. Gazing at them now, they seem spread out on a little tea table right before my eyes. This magnificent, surpassing view tops everything I have seen in my life."

"We paid a second visit to the hall on the cliff and offered prayers. Suddenly a dense fog arose in the four directions, turning everything completely white. A monk said: 'This is the Silvery World.' A short time later, there was a heavy downpour and the dense fog retreated. The monk said: “This is the rain that cleanses the cliff. The Bodhisattva is about to make a ‘Great Manifestation.' Tula clouds again spread out below the cliff, gathered thickly, and mounted upward to within a few yards of the edge, where they abruptly halted. The cloud tops were as smooth as a jade floor. From time to time raindrops flew by. I looked down into the cliff’s belly, and there was a great globe of light lying outstretched on a flat cloud. The outer corona was in three rings, each of which had indigo, yellow, red, and green hues."

"In the very center of the globe was a hollow of concentrated brightness. Each of us onlookers saw our forms in the hollow and bright spot, without the slightest detail hidden, just as if we were looking in a mirror. If you raise a hand or move a foot, the reflection does likewise. And yet you will not see the reflection of the person standing right next to you. The monk said: 'This is the Body-absorbing Light.' When the light disappeared, winds arose from the mountains in front and the clouds scurried about. In the wind and clouds there again appeared a huge, globular form of light. It spanned several mountains, exhausting every possible color and blending them into a beautiful array. The plants and trees on the peaks and ridges were so fresh and alluring, so gorgeous and striking, that you could not look at them directly."

== See also ==
- Chinese poetry
- List of geographers
- Mount Emei Scenic Area, including
  - Leshan Giant Buddha Scenic Area
- Travel literature
