= Jiang Zhongyuan =

Qing dynasty politician (1812–1854)

- Born: 1 August 1812; Xinning, Hunan Province, Qing Empire
- Died: 15 January 1854 (aged 41)
- Alma mater: Jinshi degree in the Imperial examination
- Military career
- Allegiance: Qing dynasty
- Conflicts: Taiping Rebellion: Battle of Changsha (1852)

Jiang Zhongyuan (Chinese: 江忠源), courtesy name Changrui, (常孺) was a scholar and soldier from Hunan who fought for the Qing and against the Taiping Heavenly Kingdom during the Taiping Rebellion.

== Early life ==
Jiang Zhongyuan was born on August 1, 1812, in Xinning, Hunan. He passed the provincial examination in 1837 and became a juren in 1837. He then lived in Beijing for several years, passing a special examination in 1844 to receive the jinshi degree. He then became an expectant director of district schools. In 1847, having returned to Xinning, he trained a militia of approximately 2,000 men to combat Yao tribesmen and other disaffected locals. For this he was awarded an expectant magistracy. While away, the militia was kept somewhat intact by his brothers and family friends.

Jiang was appointed acting magistrate of Xiushi from 1849 to 1850 and then became magistrate of Lishui. In 1850, Jiang's friend, Zeng Guofan recommended Jiang for higher office to the Xianfeng Emperor. Jiang did not travel to Beijing, however, but instead returned home to mourn the death of his father.

== Taiping Rebellion ==
After the Taiping Rebellion began in earnest, Jiang was recalled from mourning to assist Grand Secretary Sai-shang-a in quelling the insurrection. Jiang's volunteers were known as the Chu Yong (楚勇) and represented the first contingent of Hunanese to fight outside Hunan during the war. It was also the first in a wave of local forces led by the gentry which would eventually subdue the Taiping and served as a model for those to follow. Jiang was able to win a battle in Guangxi and was promoted to the rank of first-class sub-prefect. However, a disagreement regarding military tactics discouraged from service and he retired for a time.

In 1852, when the Taipings threatened Guilin, Jiang returned to service, leading 1,000 recruits from Xinning to the front. There, Jiang triumphed in three battles and lifted the siege of Guilin. For this, Jiang was awarded the rank of prefect. Afterwards, Jiang was able to stymie the Taiping's planned naval invasion of Hunan. Five miles north of Quanzhou, Jiang dammed the Xiang River near the Suoyi ford and set an ambush for the Taiping navy. The Taiping casualties were staggering; Jiang's forces captured, burned, or sunk 300 boats and approximately 10,000 Taiping troops were killed. Feng Yunshan, South King of the Taiping Heavenly Kingdom, was among the dead.

Jiang was less successful in stopping the Taiping's subsequent overland invasion of Hunan; while Jiang was able to besiege some Taiping in Chenzhou for over a month, but the Taiping ultimately broke through and advanced to Changsha, the capital of Hunan. Jiang assisted in defending Changsha and the Taiping eventually abandoned their siege of the city, travelling northward along the Yangtze. Jiang remained behind to suppress small uprisings with his troops.

In 1853, Jiang was promoted to intendant and then made provincial judge of Hubei. Later in 1853, he was named assistant commander of the imperial armies in Jiangnan. Before departing for the military headquarters in Jiangnan, he drafted an eight-point memorial on the military situation and submitted it to the throne. Jiang never reached his destination; in Jiujiang he learned of a planned Taiping attack on Nanchang, left to reinforce the city, and arrived one day before the Taiping. Jiang was besieged from June 22 until September 24, 1853. When the siege was lifted by relief forces, Jiang was named governor of Anhui.

Jiang then led a small force to Luzhou, the temporary capital of Anhui which was being threatened by the Taiping. Outnumbered and insufficiently provisioned, Jiang was unable to hold the city in the face of improved Taiping siege-mining. Jiang himself was wounded and captured. He committed suicide by drowning on January 15, 1854.

== Posthumous accolades ==
Jiang was posthumously granted the rank of governor-general, granted two minor hereditary ranks, and canonized as Zhonglie. In 1864, his rank was raised again. In 1856, a collection of his literary works was published, with a revised edition being printed in 1896. The revised edition included a biography of Jiang written by Guo Songtao. Jiang was said to be admired by his soldiers and has been characterized as being far-sighted, generous, brave and capable of brilliant leadership.

== Family ==
Jiang was the oldest of four brothers. Each of his brothers and several of his cousins also participated in the war against the Taipings, two of whom were eventually canonized.
