= Jack Dull =

American sinologist (1930–1995)

Jack L. Dull
- Born: January 2, 1930
- Died: January 18, 1995 (aged 65)
- Education: University of Washington (BA, PhD)
- Spouse: Peg
- Children: Two daughters and a son

Jack L. Dull (January 2, 1930 – January 18, 1995) was an American scholar of the history of Han China and a professor at the University of Washington.

== Biography ==
Born in 1930, Dull began his lifelong association with the University of Washington as an undergraduate, earning his B.A. in 1955. He was a graduate student there, completing his doctorate in 1966. He served in the faculty UW from 1963 until his death, rising from an Instructor to become Professor.

According to colleagues, Dull's scholarly strength was his constant focus on probing the Sinological tradition in search of more profound meanings. In particular, his ability to interpret ancient texts and concepts of law was particularly noted. His oeuvre, though small, has been influential. Professor Herbert Franke of Munich cited Dull's "ability to elucidate the deep structures underlying the historical phenomena and the standardized terminology of the Chinese sources." His work on marriage and divorce in Han China was path breaking, and his conclusion – against the prevailing view – that women during Han times were not subject to the mores and restrictions of later times was deemed "ahead of its time."

Dull was consistently sought as an invited participant at academic conferences and colloquia. Professor Albert Dien of Stanford University said, "For those of us who study early Chinese history, Jack has served as a sort of lifeline to the outside world of scholarship. One values his presence because he brings a wider vision of the concerns and developments in the academic world." He was highly regarded as an instructor at the University of Washington. There was a long-running joke on campus that "Professor Dull is anything but". His lectures were described by colleagues as "crisp, organized and informative, but also anecdotal and entertaining". He was known for his ability to generalize, and saw the scope for comparing Chinese with other civilizations.

Along with his teaching on China and East Asia, Dull also pursued comparative studies. His course on the Political Economy of Religion was described as a paragon of humanistically informed social science analysis. Among his American contemporaries, Dull was also known for his service to the history profession. He served on the Art History and Han Studies Delegations to the People's Republic of China (PRC) sponsored by the Committee on Scholarly Communication with the PRC of the National Academy of Sciences. In Seattle, he oversaw the East Asia National Resource Center for two decades, and served for six years as Associate Director of the Jackson School of International Studies. He chaired the China Program for nine years was the Acting Director of the Jackson School for a further two. His achievements in Resource Center direction had a national impact as a member of the National Leadership Committee of Title VI Center Directors. Dien observed that in the Directors' conferences, "Jack always took an active role, as much a critic of policies he viewed as misconceived as he was a leader in discussions. [...] His opinions carried much weight."

Dull died on January 18, 1995, after a few months battling against cancer. Dull was survived by his wife Margaret (Peggy), two daughters, a son and four granddaughters.

== Publications ==
- Jack L Dull. "A Historical Introduction to the Apocryphal (Ch'an-wei) Texts of the Han Dynasty." Ph.D. diss. University of Washington, 1966. DAI 66-11990. The seminal study in a Western language on a difficult topic.
- _____. "History and the Old Text-New Text Controversy in the Han. Unpublished 1966 ms.
- Jack L Dull ジャック・L・ダル & Shigemasa Fukui 福井重雅訳. Shin Dōkyō ni okeru Jukyōteki shoyōso 新道敎における儒敎的諸要素. [Tokyo] : Kokusho Kankōkai, [1977?].
- _____. "Marriage and Divorce in Han China: A Glimpse at Pre-Confucian Society." In David C. Buxbaum, ed. Chinese Family Law and Social Change in Historical and Comparative Perspective. Asian Law Series 3. Seattle: University of Washington Press, 1978, 23-74.
- _____. "Anti-Qin Rebels: No Peasant Leaders Here." Modern China, 9.3 (July 1983): 285-318.
- _____. "The Evolution of Government in China." In Paul S. Ropp, ed. Heritage of China: Contemporary Perspectives on Chinese Civilization. Berkeley and Los Angeles: University of California Press, 1990, 55-85.
- _____. “Determining Orthodoxy: Imperial Roles.” In Imperial Rulership and Cultural Change in Traditional China, ed. by Frederick P. Brandauer and Chün-chieh Huang. Seattle: University of Washington Press, 1994, 3-27.
- _____. "Kao-tsu's Founding and Wang Mang's Failure."
- _____. "The Legitimation of the Ch'in."
- Ch'ü T'ung-tsu. Han Social Structure. Ed. by Jack L Dull. Han Dynasty China, 1. Seattle: University of Washington Press, 1972.
- Hsü Cho-yün. Han agriculture : the formation of early Chinese agrarian economy (206 B.C. - A.D. 220). Ed. by Jack L Dull. Han Dynasty China, 2. Seattle: University of Washington Press, 1980.
