= Fengguantun =

Fengguantun 冯官屯镇
- Town
- Location in Shandong Fengguantun (China)
- Coordinates: 36°39′34″N 116°17′32″E
- Country: People's Republic of China
- Province: Shandong
- Prefecture-level city: Liaocheng
- County: Chiping
- Time zone: UTC+8 (China Standard)

Fengguantun (Chinese: 冯官屯镇) is a town in Chiping County, Liaocheng, in western Shandong province, China.
