= Fan County =

Fan County 范县
- County
- Location of the seat in Henan
- Coordinates: 35.852°N 115.504°E
- Country: People's Republic of China
- Province: Henan
- Prefecture-level city: Puyang

Area
  - Land: 610 km^{2} (240 sq mi)

Population (2019)
  - Total: 447,900
  - Density: 730/km^{2} (1,900/sq mi)
- Time zone: UTC+8 (China Standard)
- Postal code: 457500
- Website: www.fanxianw.com

Fan County
- Simplified Chinese: 范县
- Traditional Chinese: 范縣
Transcriptions
Standard Mandarin
- Hanyu Pinyin: Fàn Xiàn

Fan County, or Fanxian, (simplified Chinese: 范县; traditional Chinese: 范縣; pinyin: Fàn Xiàn) falls under the jurisdiction of Puyang, in the northeast of Henan province, China. The Northern Expedition of the Taiping Rebellion attempted to cross the Yellow River at Fanxian.

== Administrative divisions ==
As of 2012, this county is divided to 2 towns and 10 townships.

Towns

- Chengguan (城关镇)
- Pucheng (濮城镇)

Townships

- Xinzhuang Township (辛庄乡)
- Yangji Township (杨集乡)
- Chenzhuang Township (陈庄乡)
- Baiyege Township (白衣阁乡)
- Wanglou Township (王楼乡)
- Yancunpu Township (颜村铺乡)
- Longwangzhuang Township (龙王庄乡)
- Luji Township (陆集乡)
- Zhangzhuang Township (张庄乡)
- Gaomatou Township (高码头乡)

== Climate ==
Climate data for Fanxian, elevation 46 m (151 ft), (1991–2020 normals, extremes 1981–2010)
Month	Jan	Feb	Mar	Apr	May	Jun	Jul	Aug	Sep	Oct	Nov	Dec	Year
Record high °C (°F)	16.0 (60.8)	24.2 (75.6)	27.7 (81.9)	34.1 (93.4)	36.8 (98.2)	40.9 (105.6)	40.5 (104.9)	36.6 (97.9)	36.3 (97.3)	35.2 (95.4)	26.7 (80.1)	21.5 (70.7)	40.9 (105.6)
Mean daily maximum °C (°F)	4.3 (39.7)	8.5 (47.3)	14.6 (58.3)	21.0 (69.8)	26.5 (79.7)	31.8 (89.2)	31.8 (89.2)	30.3 (86.5)	26.9 (80.4)	21.3 (70.3)	12.9 (55.2)	6.0 (42.8)	19.7 (67.4)
Daily mean °C (°F)	−1.1 (30.0)	2.6 (36.7)	8.6 (47.5)	15.0 (59.0)	20.5 (68.9)	25.7 (78.3)	27.1 (80.8)	25.5 (77.9)	20.9 (69.6)	15.0 (59.0)	7.2 (45.0)	0.7 (33.3)	14.0 (57.2)
Mean daily minimum °C (°F)	−5.2 (22.6)	−1.9 (28.6)	3.4 (38.1)	9.4 (48.9)	14.8 (58.6)	20.2 (68.4)	23.2 (73.8)	21.8 (71.2)	16.3 (61.3)	10.0 (50.0)	2.6 (36.7)	−3.2 (26.2)	9.3 (48.7)
Record low °C (°F)	−19.3 (−2.7)	−17.0 (1.4)	−8.0 (17.6)	−2.2 (28.0)	3.0 (37.4)	9.1 (48.4)	16.4 (61.5)	11.2 (52.2)	4.5 (40.1)	−2.3 (27.9)	−16.3 (2.7)	−15.5 (4.1)	−19.3 (−2.7)
Average precipitation mm (inches)	4.9 (0.19)	9.3 (0.37)	13.5 (0.53)	29.1 (1.15)	48.0 (1.89)	69.7 (2.74)	140.5 (5.53)	126.3 (4.97)	55.2 (2.17)	31.1 (1.22)	22.0 (0.87)	6.3 (0.25)	555.9 (21.88)
Average precipitation days (≥ 0.1 mm)	2.6	3.2	3.6	5.2	6.1	7.6	10.9	9.9	6.8	5.5	4.6	2.7	68.7
Average snowy days	3.0	2.7	0.7	0.2	0	0	0	0	0	0	0.9	2.1	9.6
Average relative humidity (%)	64	60	59	65	68	65	79	83	78	70	70	67	69
Mean monthly sunshine hours	148.3	152.5	198.2	219.8	242.6	223.2	186.9	180.7	176.2	175.8	151.6	147.6	2,203.4
Percentage possible sunshine	48	49	53	56	56	51	42	44	48	51	50	49	50
Source: China Meteorological Administration
