= Du Bo =

Chinese nobleman

- Born: unknown
- Died: before 785 BCE
- Occupation: Minister
- Children: Xi Shu
- Writing career
- Period: Western Zhou dynasty

Du Bo
- The name "Du Bo" in printed Chinese characters.
- Chinese: 杜伯
Transcriptions
Standard Mandarin
- Hanyu Pinyin: Dù Bó (col.) {{{2}}} (lit.)
- Wade–Giles: Tu^{4}Po^{2} (col.) {{{2}}} (lit.)

Du Bo (杜伯) was the Duke of Tangdu (唐杜公) during the reign of Zhou Xuan Wang (827 – 781 BCE). After his execution, he became known as a case of an avenging spirit.

== History ==
Following a rumor that a woman would jeopardize the town of Jiangshan, King Xuan of Zhou (827–783 BCE) ordered a mass execution of women. After Du Bo admonished the king for his decision, King Xuan executed Du Bo, despite having been warned that Du Bo's ghost would haunt him. Three years, King Xuan fell ill and died after dreaming that Du Bo shot him to death with an arrow.

The Chinese philosopher, Mozi (470–391 BCE), helped cement the legend by commenting:

"If from antiquity to the present, and since the beginning of man, there are men who have seen the bodies of ghosts and spirits and heard their voices, how can we say that they do not exist? If none have heard them and none have seen them, then how can we say they do? But those who deny the existence of the spirits say: "Many in the world have heard and seen something of ghosts and spirits. Since they vary in testimony, who are to be accepted as really having heard and seen them?" Mo Zi said: As we are to rely on what many have jointly seen and what many have jointly heard, the case of Tu Po is to be accepted."

== Background ==
According to legend, the Tangdu were descendants of the people who lived in the State of Tang, a Dukedom situated to the west of the State of Yi Lin Shaanxi province. This dukedom was annihilated by Zhou Gong Dan (Duke of Zhou), but his nephew Zhou Cheng Wang allowed the Tang to form a new State of Du, and became known as Tangdu or Du Shi (杜氏).

Through Du Bo's ancestor Liu Lei (劉累) during the Xia Dynasty, Du Bo was a descendant of Emperor Yao.

Du Bo's descendant, Shi Hui (士会), also Fan Hui (范会), was the famous Duke of Fan.
