= Herbert Franke (sinologist) =

German historian

- Born: 27 September 1914
- Died: 10 June 2011 (aged 96)
- Citizenship: German
- Scientific career
- Fields: History, sinology

Herbert Franke (27 September 1914 – 10 June 2011) was a German historian of China. He is particularly known for his works on the history of the Jurchen (Jin) and Mongol (Yuan) empires in China.

After the end of World War II, Herbert Franke, along with Wolfgang Bauer, was instrumental in establishing the Sinological Section at the Ludwig-Maximilians-Universität München (LMU). Later, he succeeded Erich Haenisch as the head of the Sinology Department at that university.

He is one of the authors of volume 6 of The Cambridge History of China dealing with the history of China under the Khitan, Jurchen and Mongol regimes.

== Works ==
- Herbert Franke (1976). Sung Biographies. Steiner. ISBN 978-3-515-02412-9.
- Twitchett, Dennis; Franke, Herbert, eds. (1994). The Cambridge History of China, Volume 6: Alien Regimes and Border States, 907–1368. Cambridge: Cambridge University Press. ISBN 978-0-521-24331-5.
