= Timeline of the Five Dynasties and Ten Kingdoms =

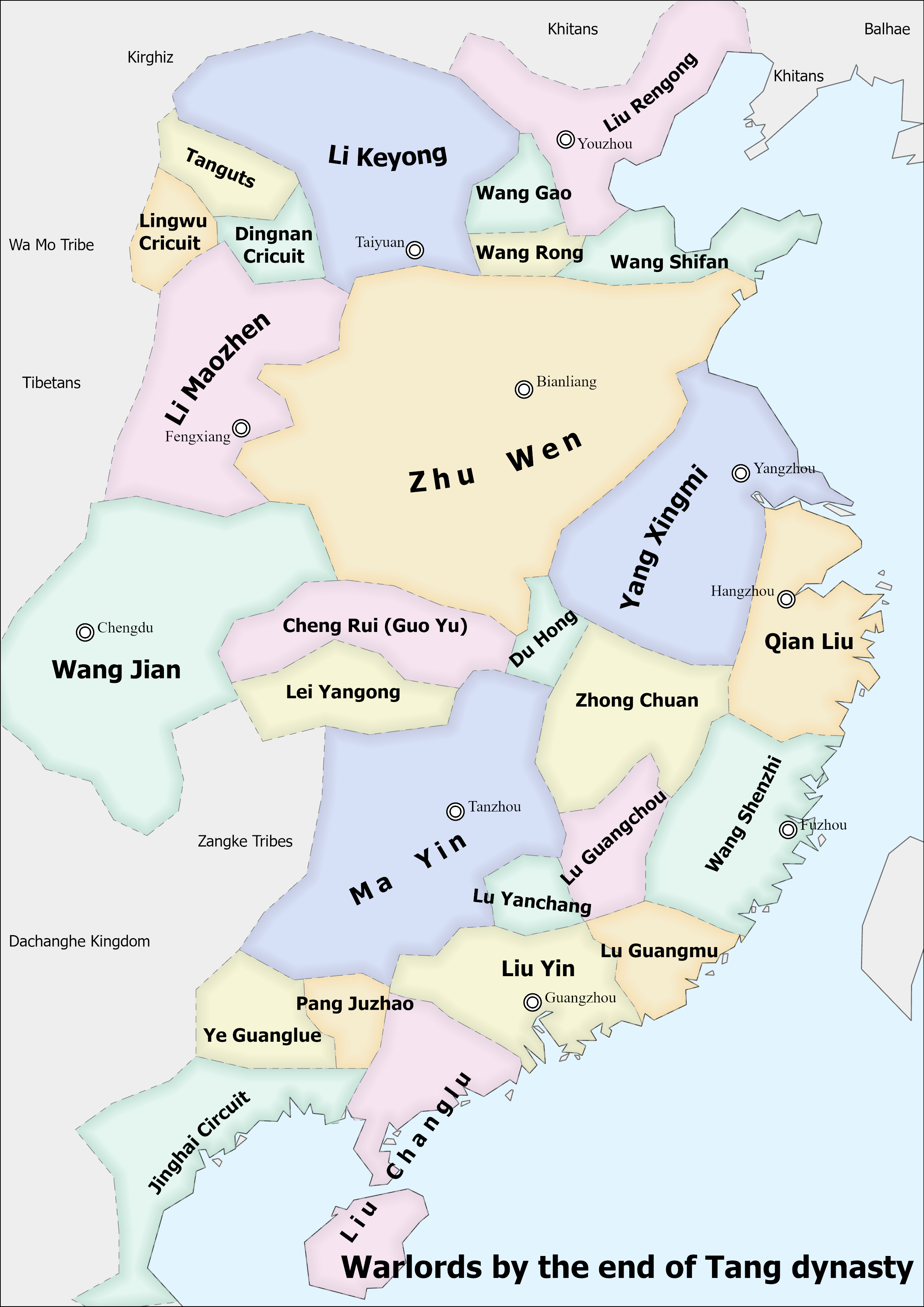
Map of warlords ("jiedushi") in 902, before the end of Tang dynasty

This is a timeline of the Five Dynasties and Ten Kingdoms (907–979), which followed the collapse of the Tang dynasty in 907 AD. The Five Dynasties refer to the succession of dynasties which ruled northern China following the Tang collapse while the Ten Kingdoms, with the exception of Northern Han, ruled in southern China. This era of division ended in 979 AD with the rise of the Song dynasty under Emperor Taizu of Song, although the Song would never reconquer the northern territory lost to the Khitans, collectively known as the Sixteen Prefectures.

== 900s ==
Year	Date	Event
907		Later Liang: Zhu Wen deposes Emperor Ai of Tang and founds the Later Liang in Kaifeng, ruling over North China
907		Later Liang: The Khúc clan takes control of Annam and establishes tributary relations with Later Liang
907		Jin: Li Keyong stays independent as Jin in Shanxi
907		Chu: Later Liang makes Ma Yin Prince of Chu
907		Wuyue: Qian Liu becomes Prince of Wuyue
907		Former Shu: Wang Jian declares himself emperor of Former Shu in Chengdu
908		Jin: Li Keyong dies and is succeeded by his son Li Cunxu
909		Later Liang: Zhu Wen moves the Ancestral Temple to Luoyang
909		Min: Wang Shenzhi becomes Prince of Min in Fuzhou

== 910s ==
Year	Date	Event
911		Yan: Liu Shouguang declares Yan around modern day Beijing
912		Later Liang: Zhu Wen is killed by his son Zhu Yougui, who usurps power
913		Jin: Defeats Liu Shouguang
913		Later Liang: Zhu Yougui is killed by his brother Zhu Youzhen, who seizes power and moves the capital to Kaifeng
916		Abaoji declares himself emperor of the Khitans
917		Southern Han: Liu Yan declares himself emperor of Great Yue in Guangzhou
918		Southern Han: Liu Yan renames Great Yue to Southern Han
919		Wu: Yang Longyan declares himself Prince of Wu
919		The gunpowder slow match appears in China.

== 920s ==
Year	Date	Event
922		Abaoji raids Jin
923		Later Tang: Li Cunxu conquers Later Liang and founds Later Tang
923		Qi: Li Maozhen submits to Later Tang
923		Abaoji raids Later Tang
924		Later Tang: Capital is moved to Luoyang
924		Jingnan: Gao Jixing becomes Prince of Nanping in Jingzhou
925		Later Tang: Conquers Former Shu and names Luoyang its Eastern Capital
926		Later Tang: Li Cunxu is killed and Li Siyuan becomes emperor in Luoyang

== 930s ==
Year	Date	Event
930		Southern Han: Invades Annam and removes the Khúc clan from power
930		Later Tang: Yelü Bei flees to Later Tang
931		Southern Han: Dương Đình Nghệ expels Southern Han from Đại La and declares himself governor
932		Wuyue: Qian Liu dies and is succeeded by his son Qian Yuanguan who dies not long after and is succeeded by Li Congke
932		The Twelve Classics and other texts are printed
934		Later Tang: Li Siyuan dies and is succeeded by his son Li Conghou
934		Later Shu: Meng Zhixiang declares himself emperor of Later Shu and dies not long after and is succeeded by his son Meng Chang
936	28 November	Later Jin: Khitans install Shi Jingtang as emperor of the Later Jin. In return Shi transfers 16 prefectures in Shanxi and Hebei to the Liao.
936		Later Jin: Conquers Later Tang
937		Southern Tang: Li Bian declares himself emperor of Southern Tang in Jinling and replaces Wu
937		Southern Han: Kiều Công Tiễn kills Dương Đình Nghệ and calls Southern Han into a war against his enemies in the southern provinces, however Đình Nghệ's son-in-law Ngô Quyền murders Công Tiễn
937		Later Jin: Shi Jingtang kills Yelü Bei
938		Battle of Bạch Đằng: Ngô Quyền defeats the Southern Han fleet
939		Ngô Quyền declares his own Ngô dynasty at Cổ Loa Citadel

== 940s ==
Year	Date	Event
942		Southern Han: Liu Yan dies
942		Later Jin: Shi Jingtang dies and is succeeded by his nephew Shi Chonggui
943		Southern Tang: Li Bian dies
945		Southern Tang: Conquers Min
947		The Khitan state is named the Liao dynasty
947		Liao dynasty invades Later Jin and sacks Xiang Prefecture, killing most of its population
947		Later Han: Liu Zhiyuan declares himself emperor of Later Han in Kaifeng
948		Later Han: Liu Zhiyuan dies and is succeeded by his son Liu Chengyou

== 950s ==
Year	Date	Event
950		Later Han: Liu Chengyou fails to kill Guo Wei and dies
950		Fire lances appear in China.
951		Later Zhou: Guo Wei declares himself emperor of Later Zhou
951		Northern Han: Liu Chong declares himself emperor of Northern Han in Taiyuan
951		Southern Tang: Annexes Chu
953		The Iron Lion of Cangzhou, the largest and oldest surviving cast iron artwork in China, is cast
954		Later Zhou: Guo Wei dies and is succeeded by his adopted son Chai Rong
955		Later Zhou: Chai Rong launches proscription campaign against Buddhism
956		Later Zhou: Chai Rong launches expedition against Southern Tang
957		Later Zhou: Chai Rong captures areas south of the Huai from Southern Tang
959		Later Zhou: Chai Rong dies and is succeeded by his son Chai Zongxun

== 960s ==
Year	Date	Event
960	February	Song dynasty: Zhao Kuangyin declares himself Emperor Taizu of Song, replacing Later Zhou
963		Song: Conquers Jingnan
963		Song: Introduces the appointment by protection system, which allows high officials to nominate their sons, grandsons, and nephews for the civil service
965		Song conquest of Later Shu: Song conquers Later Shu
965		Tao Gu provides the first written documentation of using cormorants for fishing
968		Đinh Bộ Lĩnh of the Đinh dynasty declares independence from China
969		Gunpowder propelled fire arrows, rocket arrows, are invented by Yue Yifang and Feng Jisheng.

== 970s ==
Year	Date	Event
971		Song conquest of Southern Han: Song conquers Southern Han
974		The earliest natural history of pharmaceuticals, the Kaibao Bencao, is printed
975		Song conquest of Southern Tang: Song conquers Southern Tang
976	14 November	Song: Emperor Taizu of Song dies and his brother Zhao Guangyi succeeds him as Emperor Taizong of Song
978		Song: Conquers Wuyue
979		Song conquest of Northern Han: Song conquers Northern Han

== Gallery ==
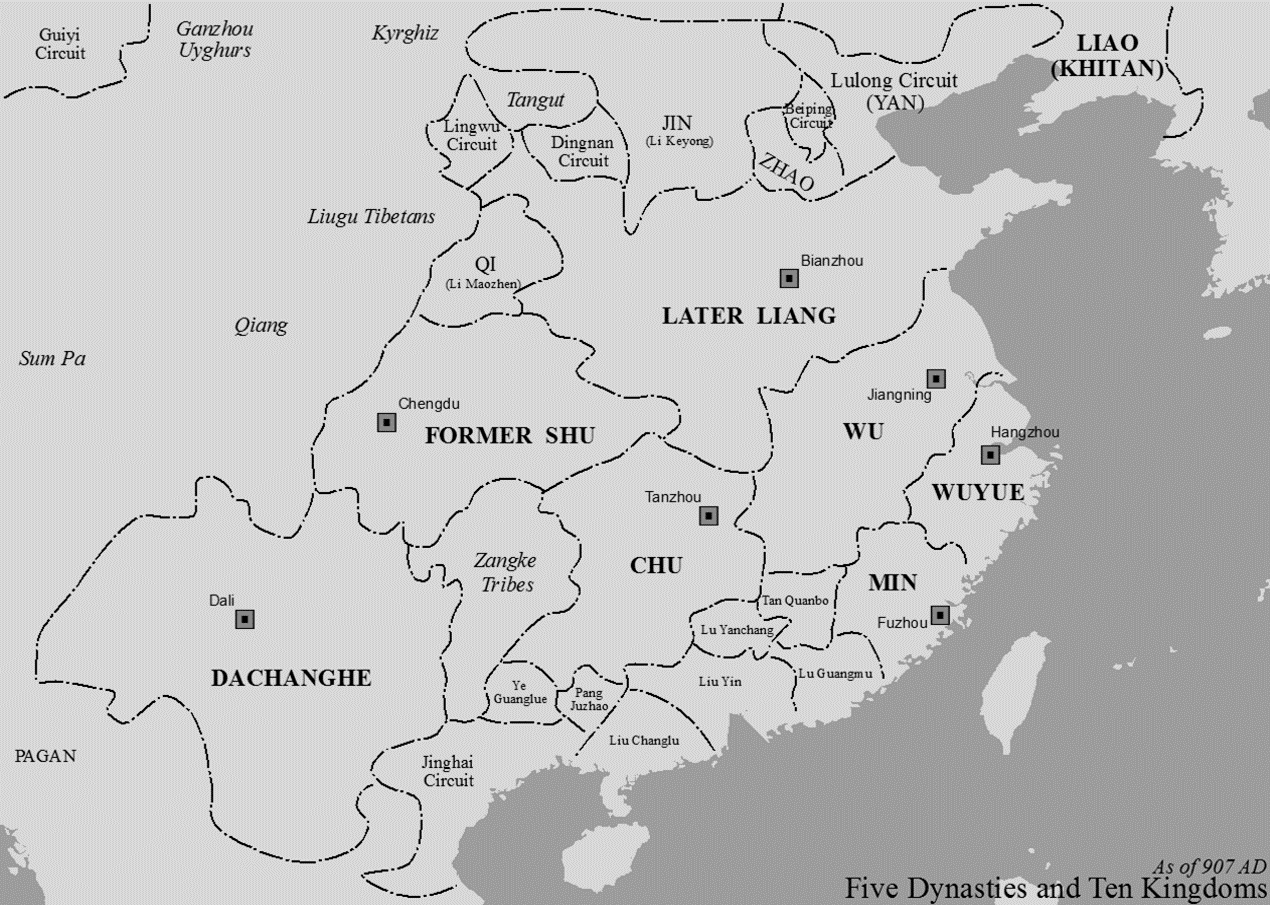
Later Liang in 907 AD

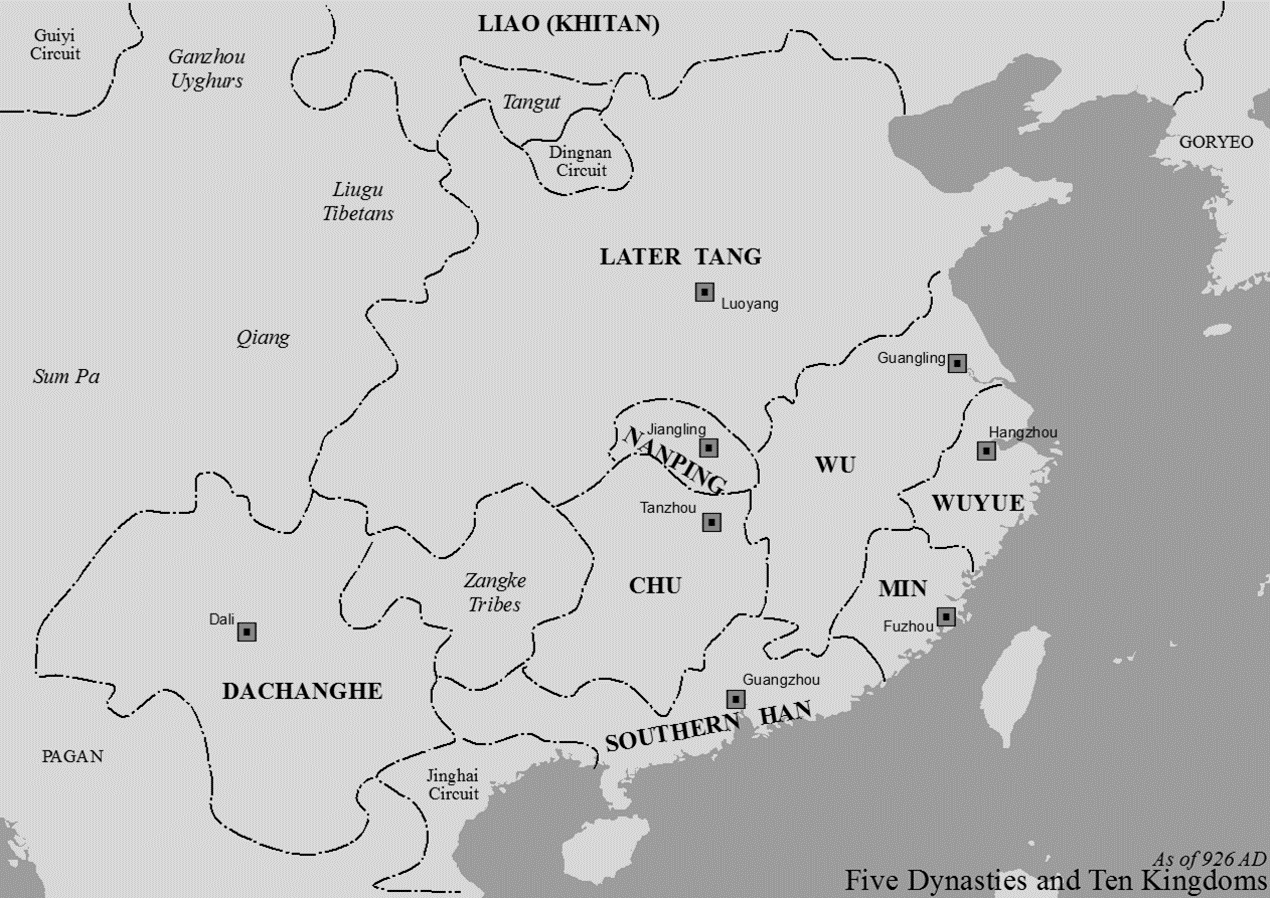
Later Tang in 926 AD

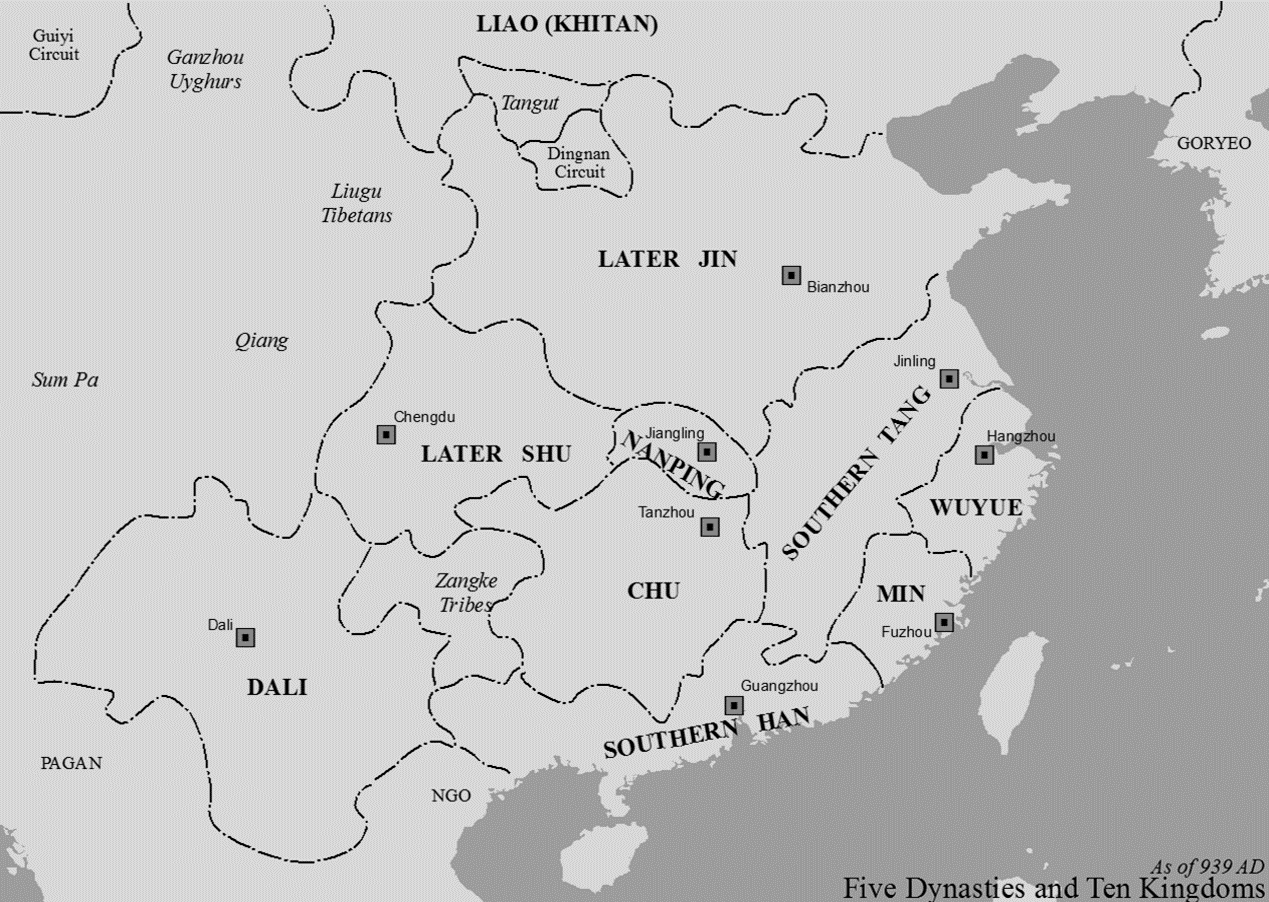
Later Jin in 939 AD

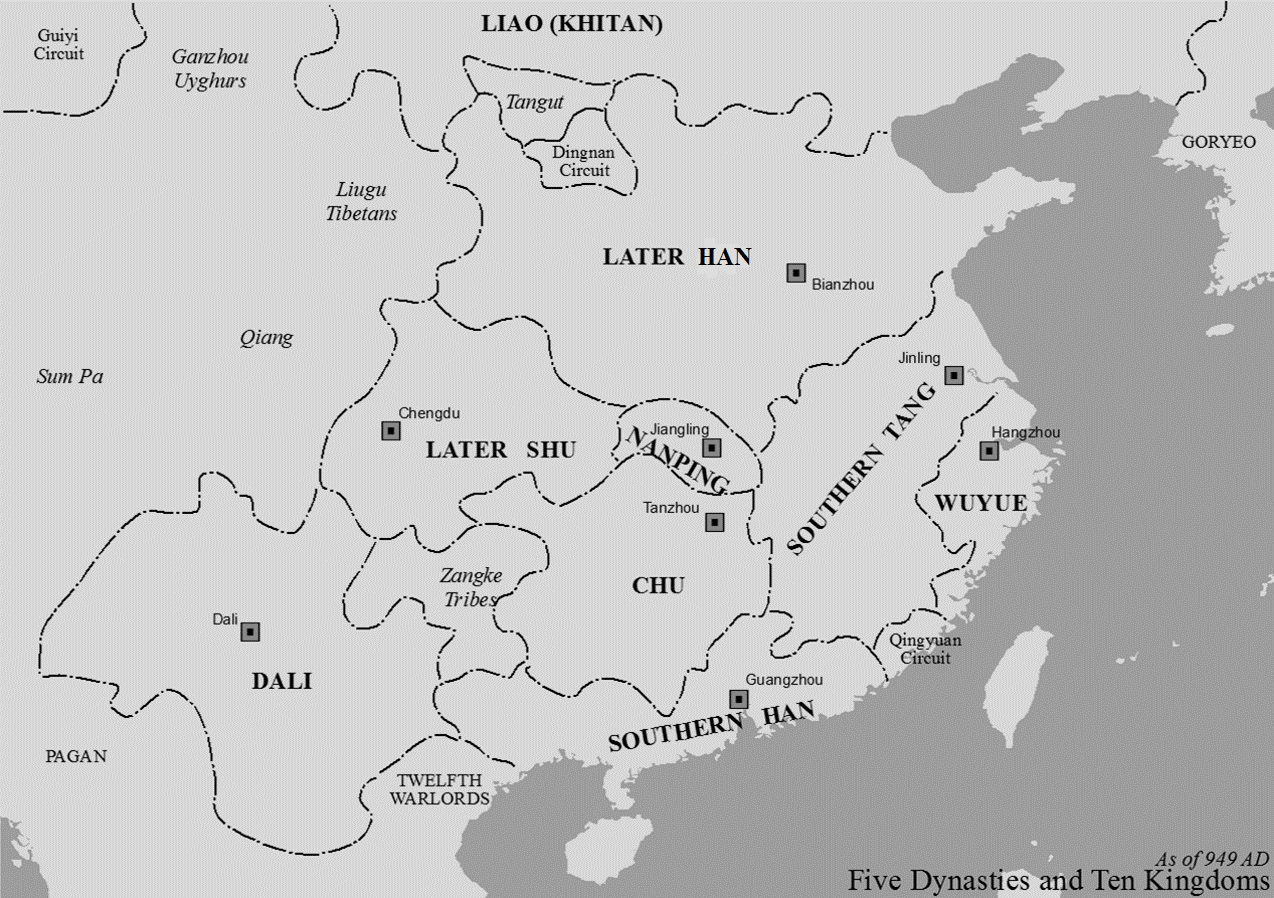
Later Han in 949 AD

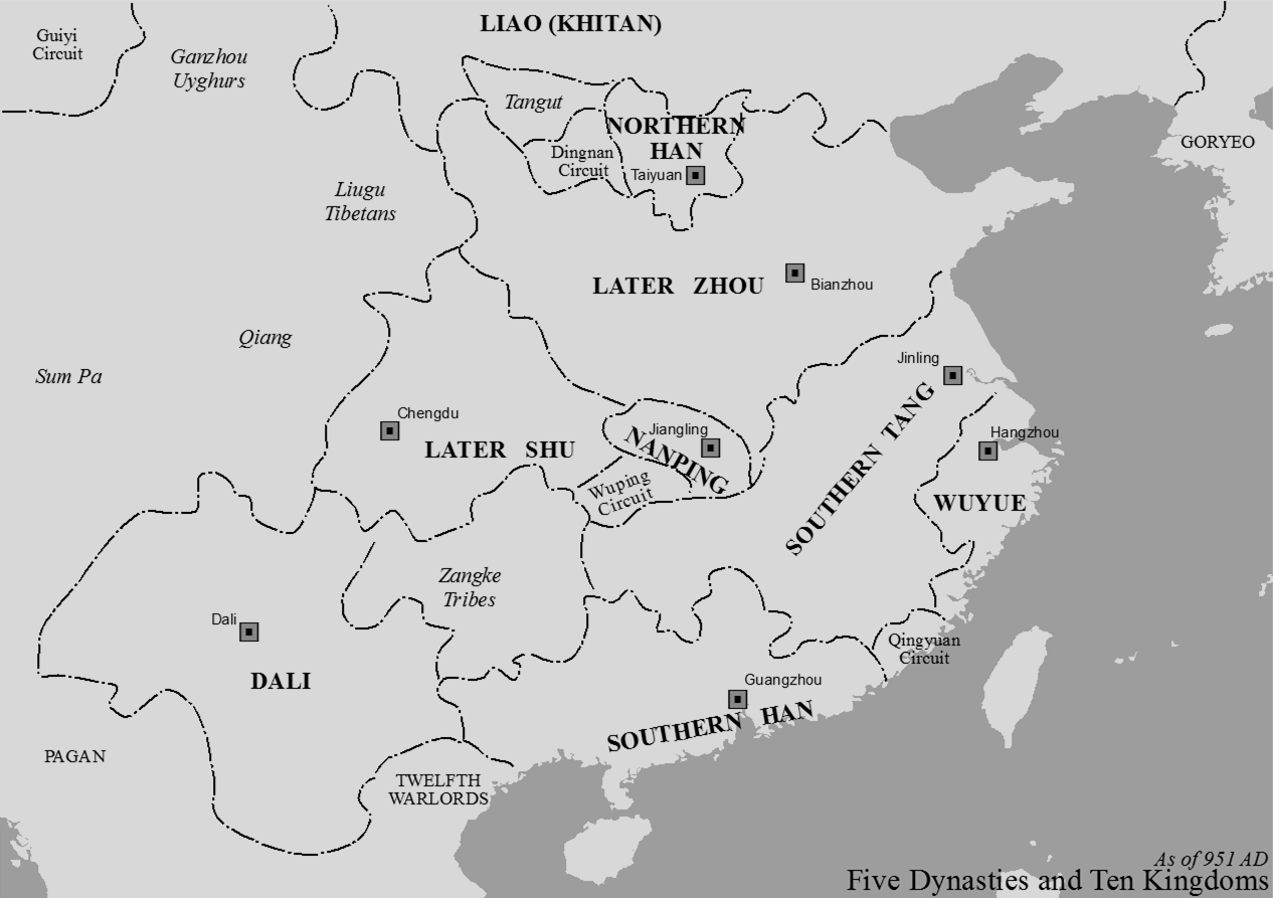
Later Zhou in 951 AD

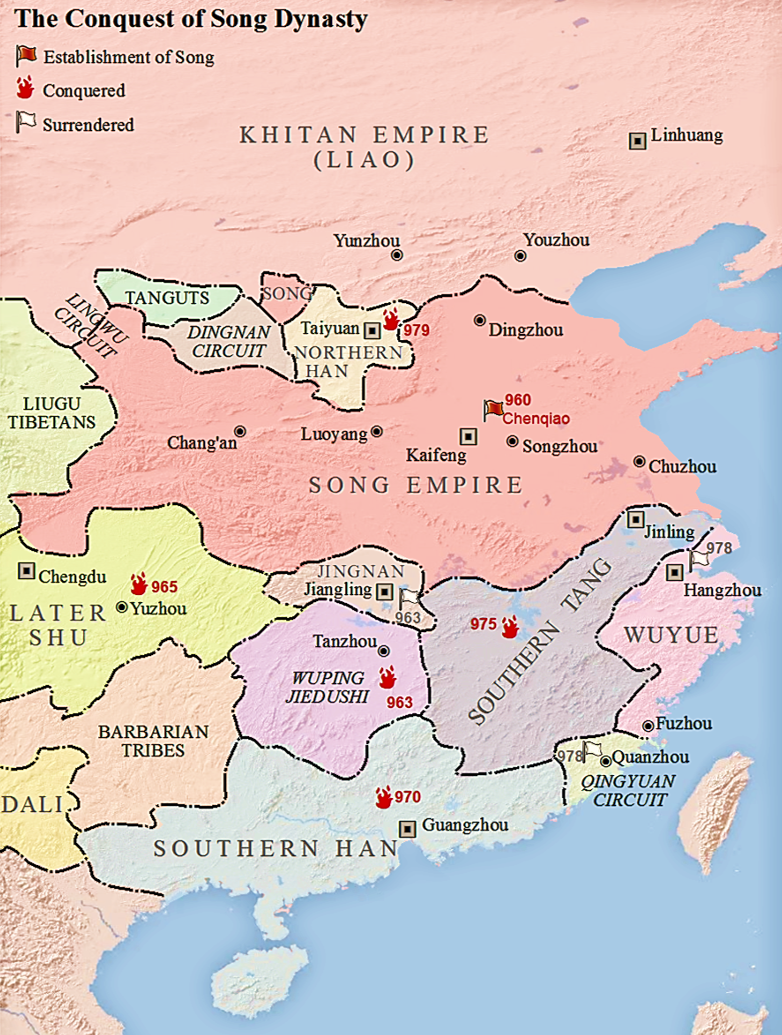
Song dynasty's conquest of China

== Bibliography ==
- Andrade, Tonio (2016), The Gunpowder Age: China, Military Innovation, and the Rise of the West in World History, Princeton University Press, ISBN 978-0-691-13597-7.
- Asimov, M.S. (1998), History of civilizations of Central Asia Volume IV The age of achievement: A.D. 750 to the end of the fifteenth century Part One The historical, social and economic setting, UNESCO Publishing
- Barfield, Thomas (1989), The Perilous Frontier: Nomadic Empires and China, Basil Blackwell
- Barrett, Timothy Hugh (2008), The Woman Who Discovered Printing, Great Britain: Yale University Press, ISBN 978-0-300-12728-7 (alk. paper)
- Beckwith, Christopher I (1987), The Tibetan Empire in Central Asia: A History of the Struggle for Great Power among Tibetans, Turks, Arabs, and Chinese during the Early Middle Ages, Princeton University Press
- Beckwith, Christopher I. (2009), Empires of the Silk Road: A History of Central Eurasia from the Bronze Age to the Present, Princeton University Press, ISBN 978-0-691-13589-2
- Biran, Michal (2005), The Empire of the Qara Khitai in Eurasian History: Between China and the Islamic World, Cambridge Studies in Islamic Civilization, Cambridge, England: Cambridge University Press, ISBN 0521842263
- Bregel, Yuri (2003), An Historical Atlas of Central Asia, Brill
- Chase, Kenneth Warren (2003), Firearms: A Global History to 1700, Cambridge University Press, ISBN 978-0-521-82274-9
- Chia, Lucille (2011), Knowledge and Text Production in an Age of Print: China, 900-1400, Brill
- Drompp, Michael Robert (2005), Tang China And The Collapse Of The Uighur Empire: A Documentary History, Brill
- Ebrey, Patricia Buckley (1999), The Cambridge Illustrated History of China, Cambridge: Cambridge University Press, ISBN 0-521-66991-X (paperback).
- Ebrey, Patricia Buckley; Walthall, Anne; Palais, James B. (2006), East Asia: A Cultural, Social, and Political History, Boston: Houghton Mifflin, ISBN 0-618-13384-4
- Golden, Peter B. (1992), An Introduction to the History of the Turkic Peoples: Ethnogenesis and State-Formation in Medieval and Early Modern Eurasia and the Middle East, OTTO HARRASSOWITZ · WIESBADEN
- Graff, David A. (2002), Medieval Chinese Warfare, 300-900, Warfare and History, London: Routledge, ISBN 0415239559
- Graff, David Andrew (2016), The Eurasian Way of War Military Practice in Seventh-Century China and Byzantium, Routledge, ISBN 978-0-415-46034-7.
- Haywood, John (1998), Historical Atlas of the Medieval World, AD 600-1492, Barnes & Noble
- Kelly, Jack (2004), Gunpowder: Alchemy, Bombards, & Pyrotechnics: The History of the Explosive that Changed the World, Basic Books, ISBN 0-465-03718-6.
- Knapp, Ronald G. (2008), Chinese Bridges: Living Architecture From China's Past. Singapore, Tuttle Publishing
- Kuhn, Dieter (2009), The Age of Confucian Rule, Harvard University Press
- Latourette, Kenneth Scott (1964), The Chinese, their history and culture, Volumes 1-2, Macmillan
- Liang, Jieming (2006), Chinese Siege Warfare: Mechanical Artillery & Siege Weapons of Antiquity, Singapore, Republic of Singapore: Leong Kit Meng, ISBN 981-05-5380-3
- Lorge, Peter (2005), War, Politics and Society in Early Modern China, 900–1795, Routledge, ISBN 978-0-203-96929-8
- Lorge, Peter A. (2008), The Asian Military Revolution: from Gunpowder to the Bomb, Cambridge University Press, ISBN 978-0-521-60954-8
- Lu, Gwei-Djen (1988), "The Oldest Representation of a Bombard", Technology and Culture, 29 (3): 594–605, doi:10.1353/tech.1988.0097
- Luttwak, Edward N. (2009), The Grand Strategy of the Byzantine Empire, The Belknap Press of Harvard University Press
- Millward, James (2009), Eurasian Crossroads: A History of Xinjiang, Columbia University Press
- Mote, F. W. (2003), Imperial China: 900–1800, Harvard University Press, ISBN 978-0674012127
- Needham, Joseph (1986a), Science and Civilization in China: Volume 3, Mathematics and the Sciences of the Heavens and the Earth, Taipei: Caves Books
- —— (1986g), Science and Civilization in China: Volume 4, Physics and Physical Engineering, Part 1, Physics, Taipei: Caves Books
- —— (1986b), Science and Civilization in China: Volume 4, Physics and Physical Engineering, Part 2, Mechanical Engineering, Taipei: Caves Books
- —— (1986c), Science and Civilization in China: Volume 4, Physics and Physical Technology, Part 3, Civil Engineering and Nautics, Taipei: Caves Books
- —— (1986d), Science and Civilization in China: Volume 5, Chemistry and Chemical Technology, Part 1, Paper and Printing, Taipei: Caves Books
- —— (1986e), Science and Civilization in China: Volume 5, Chemistry and Chemical Technology, Part 4, Spagyrical Discovery and Invention: Apparatus, Theories and Gifts, Taipei: Caves Books
- —— (1986h), Science and Civilization in China: Volume 6, Biology and Biological Technology, Part 1, Botany, Cambridge University Press
- —— (1986f), Science & Civilisation in China, vol. V:7: The Gunpowder Epic, Cambridge University Press, ISBN 0-521-30358-3
- Needham, Joseph (2008), Science & Civilisation in China Volume 5 Part 11, Cambridge University Press
- Pacey, Arnold (1991), Technology in World Civilization: A Thousand-year History, MIT Press
- Partington, J. R. (1960), A History of Greek Fire and Gunpowder, Cambridge, UK: W. Heffer & Sons.
- Partington, J. R. (1999), A History of Greek Fire and Gunpowder, Baltimore: Johns Hopkins University Press, ISBN 0-8018-5954-9
- Reilly, Kevin (2012), The Human Journey: A Concise Introduction to World History, Volume 1, Rowman & Littlefield
- Rong, Xinjiang (2013), Eighteen Lectures on Dunhuang, Brill
- Schafer, Edward H. (1985), The Golden Peaches of Samarkand: A study of T'ang Exotics, University of California Press
- Shaban, M. A. (1979), The ʿAbbāsid Revolution, Cambridge: Cambridge University Press, ISBN 0-521-29534-3
- Sima, Guang (2015), Bóyángbǎn Zīzhìtōngjiàn 54 huánghòu shīzōng 柏楊版資治通鑑54皇后失蹤, Yuǎnliú chūbǎnshìyè gǔfèn yǒuxiàn gōngsī, ISBN 978-957-32-0876-1
- Skaff, Jonathan Karam (2012), Sui-Tang China and Its Turko-Mongol Neighbors: Culture, Power, and Connections, 580-800 (Oxford Studies in Early Empires), Oxford University Press
- Standen, Naomi (2007), Unbounded Loyalty Frontier Crossings in Liao China, University of Hawai'i Press
- Taylor, K.W. (2013), A History of the Vietnamese, Cambridge University Press
- Twitchett, Denis C. (1979), The Cambridge History of China, Vol. 3, Sui and T'ang China, 589–906, Cambridge University Press
- Twitchett, Denis (1994), "The Liao", The Cambridge History of China, Volume 6, Alien Regime and Border States, 907-1368, Cambridge: Cambridge University Press, pp. 43–153, ISBN 0521243319
- Twitchett, Denis (2009), The Cambridge History of China Volume 5 The Sung dynasty and its Predecessors, 907-1279, Cambridge University Press
- Walker, Hugh Dyson (2012), East Asia: A New History, AuthorHouse
- Wang, Zhenping (2013), Tang China in Multi-Polar Asia: A History of Diplomacy and War, University of Hawaii Press
- Wilkinson, Endymion (2012), Chinese History: A New Manual, Harvard University Asia Center for the Harvard-Yenching Institute
- Wilkinson, Endymion (2015), Chinese History: A New Manual, 4th edition, Cambridge, MA: Harvard University Asia Center distributed by Harvard University Press, ISBN 9780674088467
- Xiong, Victor Cunrui (2000), Sui-Tang Chang'an: A Study in the Urban History of Late Medieval China (Michigan Monographs in Chinese Studies), U OF M CENTER FOR CHINESE STUDIES, ISBN 0892641371
- Xiong, Victor Cunrui (2009), Historical Dictionary of Medieval China, United States of America: Scarecrow Press, Inc., ISBN 978-0810860537
- Xu, Elina-Qian (2005), HISTORICAL DEVELOPMENT OF THE PRE-DYNASTIC KHITAN, Institute for Asian and African Studies 7
- Xue, Zongzheng (1992), Turkic peoples, 中国社会科学出版社
- Yuan, Shu (2001), Bóyángbǎn Tōngjiàn jìshìběnmò 28 dìèrcìhuànguánshídài 柏楊版通鑑記事本末28第二次宦官時代, Yuǎnliú chūbǎnshìyè gǔfèn yǒuxiàn gōngsī, ISBN 957-32-4273-7

Preceded by Tang dynasty	Dynasties in Chinese history 907–960	Succeeded by Song dynasty Liao dynasty
