= Southern Tang =

State in Southern China (937–976)

Tang 唐
- 937–976
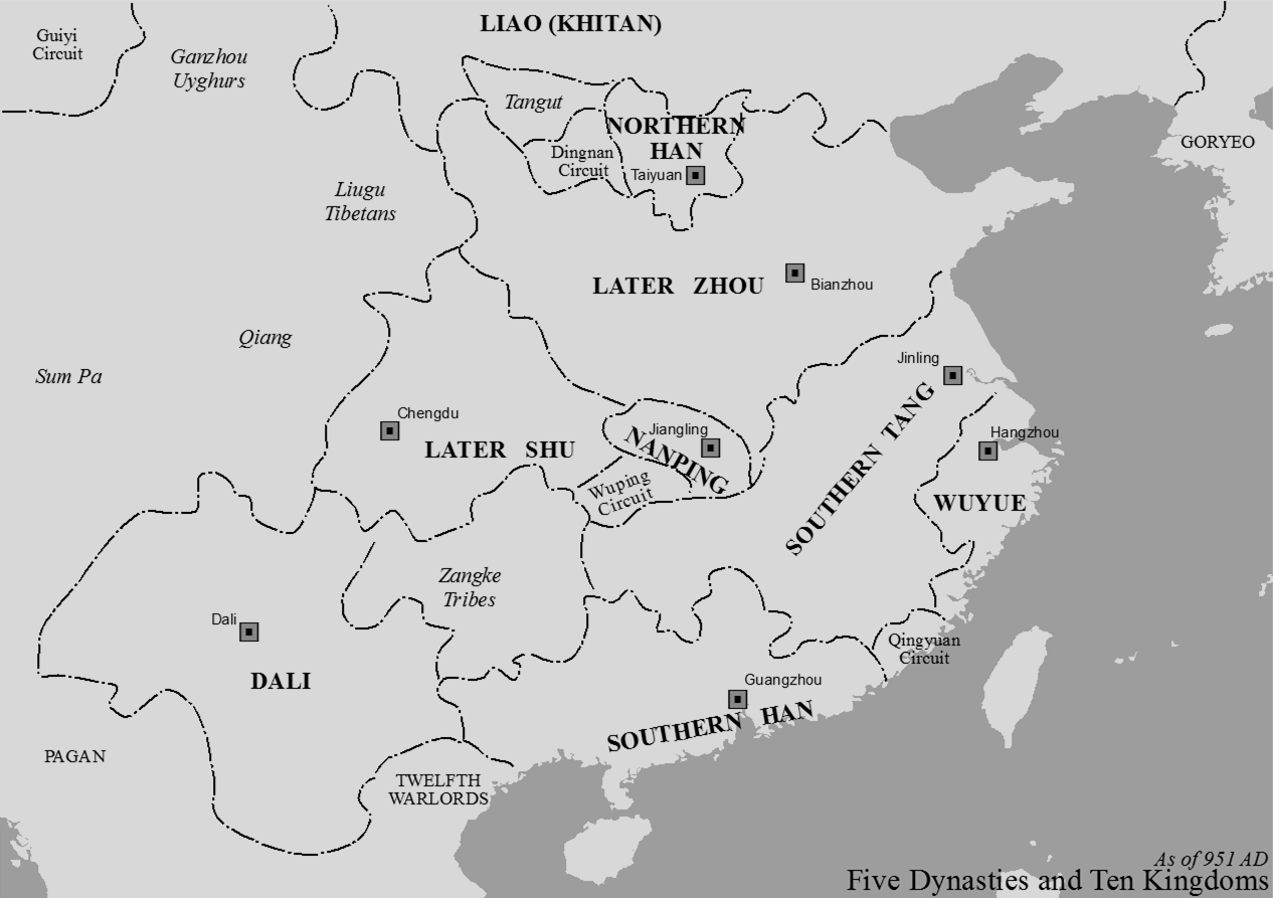
- The Southern Tang territorial peak in 951
- Capital: Jinling, Guangling (briefly Nanchang)
- Common languages: Middle Chinese
- Government: Monarchy
- Emperor/King
  - 937–943: Li Bian
  - 943–961: Li Jing
  - 961–976: Li Yu
- Historical era: Five Dynasties and Ten Kingdoms Period
  - Overthrow of the Yang Wu dynasty: 937
  - Assumption of the name "Tang": 939
  - Conquest of Min: 945
  - Conquest of Ma Chu: 951
  - Forced to cede Huainan and become a vassal of Later Zhou: 958
  - Annexed by the Northern Song dynasty: 976
- Currency: Chinese coin; Chinese cash
Preceded by
Yang Wu
Min
Ma Chu
Succeeded by
Northern Song
- Today part of: China

Southern Tang (Chinese: 南唐; pinyin: Nán Táng) was a dynastic state of China that existed during Five Dynasties and Ten Kingdoms period. Located in southern China, the Southern Tang proclaimed itself to be the successor of the Tang dynasty. The capital was located at Nanjing in present-day Jiangsu Province. At its territorial peak in 951, the Southern Tang controlled the whole of modern Jiangxi, and portions of Anhui, Fujian, Hubei, Hunan, and Jiangsu provinces.

The Southern Tang was founded by Li Bian in 937, when he overthrew emperor Yang Pu of Wu. He largely maintained peaceable relations with neighboring states. His son Li Jing did not follow this foreign policy, conquering the Min and Ma Chu dynasties in 945 and 951 respectively.

The Later Zhou dynasty invaded the Southern Tang domain in 956 and defeated them by 958. Li Jing was forced to become a vassal of the Emperor Shizong of Later Zhou, cede all territory north of the Yangtze River, and relinquish his title of emperor. In 960, the Southern Tang became a vassal of the newly established Northern Song dynasty. After the Emperor Taizu of Song had defeated the Later Shu and the Southern Han, he ordered the conquest of the Southern Tang, which was completed in 975.

== Name ==
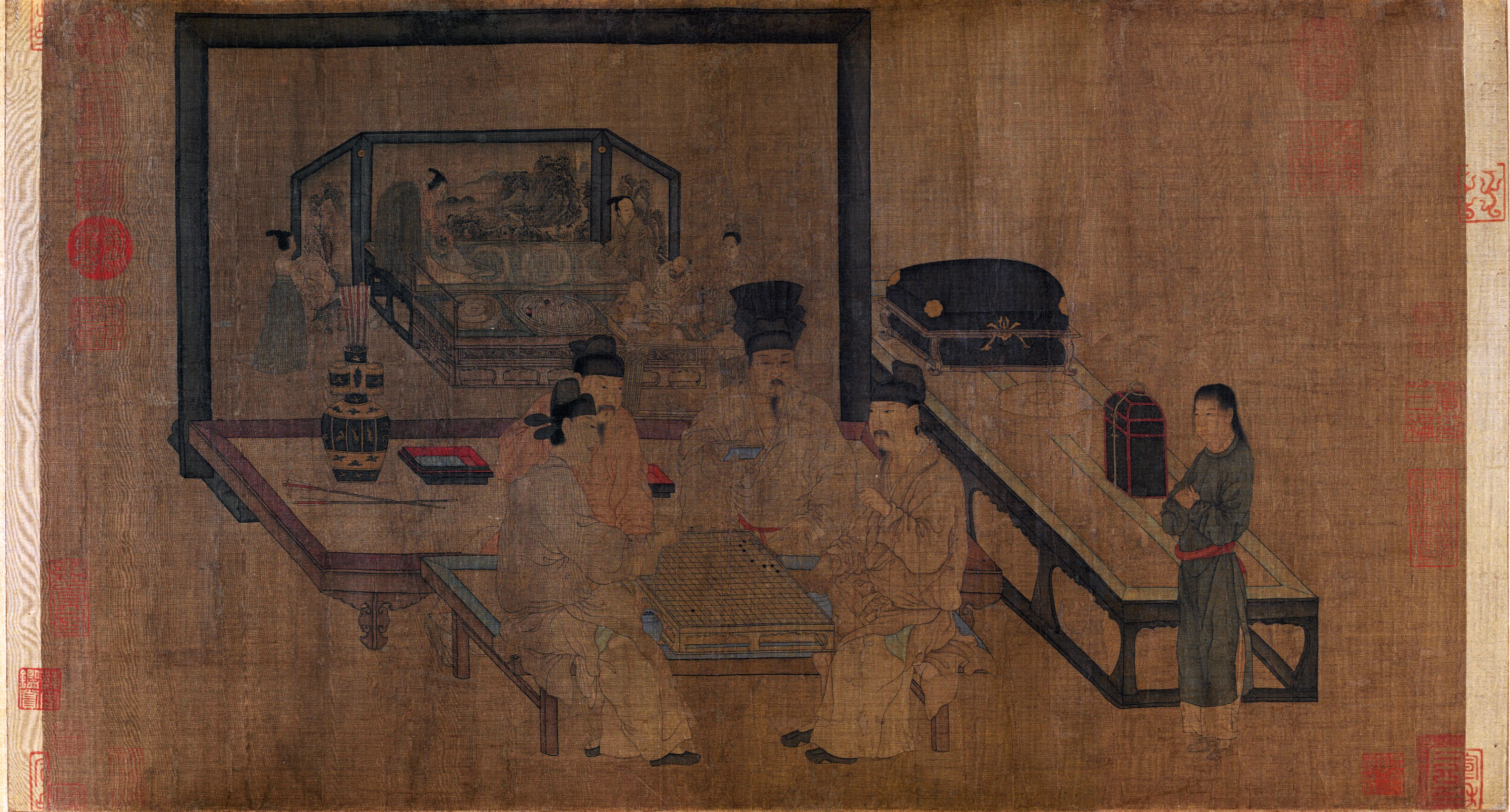
Chess Meeting with Double Screens, depicting Li Jing playing weiqi with his brothers. Painting by Zhou Wenju (fl. 942–961)

The names and titles used by Southern Tang rulers changed several times throughout its existence. In the 930s Xu Zhigao ruled as king over a sizeable territory called Qi (齊) that existed within Wu. After deposing the Yang Imperial family in 937 he adopted the title of emperor and announced the creation Great Qi (大齊). The Zizhi Tongjian referred to this state as Tang from its foundation, while the majority of historical sources, including the Old History of the Five Dynasties, New History of the Five Dynasties, and the Spring and Autumn Annals of the Ten Kingdoms, referred to the state as Qi. They begin to use Tang only after Xu Zhigao adopted the name Li Bian in 939.

Unlike the continual unrest and rebellions of the Central Plains, Tang rule across the Yangtze and Southern China had been generally more successful. These halcyon days had become a source of nostalgia for people in the south. This respect paid to the deposed dynasty became a useful political tool for Li Bian. The Later Tang were overthrown in late 936, which opened the way for Li Bian to claim it. In February 939 Li Bian renamed his realm to Great Tang (大唐). Taking on the name of Tang increased his status. Such a move could be easily construed to mean "the potential unification of [Chinese] territories under one ruler."

Li Jing was defeated in 958 by Later Zhou Emperor Chai Rong. The Southern Tang were forced to cede their territories north of the Yangtze and become a vassal of the Later Zhou. Li Jing additionally had to renounce claims to emperorship. The rump state was centered on Jiangnan, which was used by both the Later Zhou and the Song to refer to the Southern Tang. Later Zhou correspondence called Li Jing the "King of Jiangnan" (江南國主). He however used the title "King of Tang" (唐國主) and "Seal of Tang" (唐國之印) for the government.

Li Yu, the third and final Southern Tang monarch, initially used the title and seal of his father. He attempted to demonstrate obeisance to Emperor Taizu after the Song conquest of Southern Han. Li Yu created a more modest "Seal of Jiangnan" (江南國印) and abandoned "Ruler of Tang" in favor of "Ruler of the State of Jiangnan", which remained used until 976 when he surrendered to the invading Song armies. Taizu gave Li Yu the humiliating title of Marquis of Disobedience (違名侯) when he arrived in Bian.

Historical texts produced during the Song dynasty were named after Jiangnan, with variants of Jiangzuo (江左) and Jiangbiao (江俵) also used. By not using the formal name it claimed, authors denied the Southern Tang "the status of an independent state." Reign titles of rulers were likewise seen as unacceptable and their personal names were used exclusively.

== Background ==
Yang Xingmi was the Jiedushi of Huainan Circuit during the final years of the Tang dynasty. Throughout a series of conflicts with neighboring officials he expanded his control over most contemporary Jiangsu and Anhui, along with parts of Jiangxi and Hubei. In 902 Emperor Zhaozong recognized Yang Xingmi's conquests and granted him the title of the Prince of Wu (吳王). He ruled for three more years and died in 905. Yang Wo succeeded his father as the Prince of Wu.

In 907 the last Tang Emperor was evicted from power by Zhu Quanzhong, who declared the Later Liang dynasty. Yang Wo did not recognize this regime change as legitimate and continued to use the Tang era name of 'Tianyou'. Without a reigning Tang emperor, however, he was in effect an independent ruler. In 921 Yang Longyan proclaimed his own reign title. His brother Yang Pu continued this trend of asserting ideological independence from the Kaifeng-based regimes by claiming the title of Emperor in 927. This irrevocably ended diplomatic contact with the Later Tang.

During a campaign in 895 an orphaned child was captured, whom Yang Xingmi initially took into his household. However, his oldest son Yang Wo disliked the child, and so Yang decided to give the child to his lieutenant Xu Wen. The child was given the name Xu Zhigao. Using the threat of Wu-Yueh raids as an excuse, Xu Wen turned Chiang-nan into his base of operations. This in time would morph into the Kingdom of Qi. While Xu Wen assumed a position of power over the Yang family, he likely did not depose them due to unfavorable circumstances rather than the lack of will to do so.

In 927 Xu Zhigao inherited Xu Wen's position of power behind the Wu monarchy and laid out the groundwork for his seizure of the throne. He feared that the majority of the bureaucracy still supported the imperial Yang family. The Crown Prince Yang Lian was arranged to marry one of his daughters.

In September 935 Yang Pu and Xu Zhigao settled on the territorial extent of the kingdom of Qi as having 10 of the 25 prefectures then under Wu control. Yang Pu awarded Xu Zhigao the title of King of Qi (齊王) in March of 937. In May he dropped the ranking character 'zhi' from his given name to distinguish from his adopted brothers and was now known as Xu Gao. In October of the same year Yang Pu surrendered the state seal to him, ending Yang rule of Wu

== Foundation ==
On 11 November 937 Xu Gao formally ascended the throne. Xu Gao took inspiration from Tang governance and established two capitals. Jingling was already his seat of power and became the principal location of the court. The old Wu capital of Guangling meanwhile maintained some significance as the secondary capital. His reign according to Robert Krompart represented the initial rebuilding "of the social, economic, administrative, and religious forces that produce stability in China."

On 12 March 939 Xu Gao took on the name of Li Bian. He additionally authorized a genealogy that claimed descent from the Tang Imperial family. Records vary about whom his supposed Tang progenitor was. Johannes L. Kurz concluded that the more reliable sources state his ancestor was either son or a younger brother of Xuanzong. On 2 May 939 Li Bian performed the traditional sacrifices to Heaven. Jingnan and Wuyue sent ambassadors praising this event.

Li Bian encouraged the bureaucratization of his court, taking power away from military officers. The constant turmoil of the Central Plains created a pool of experienced émigré officials that relocated to the more stable south. Li Bian was in particular interested in men versed in Confucian rituals. Ma Ling (馬令) reported that the civilian government maintained by Li Bian "was humane and attracted men from far and near." Among these recruits was Han Xizai, who rose in prominence during the reign of Li Jing.

The question of succession arose near the end of Li Bian's reign. He preferred his second son Li Jingda. However, his oldest son Li Jing was eventually picked as his heir. In 943 Li Bian died and Li Jing succeeded his father.

== Economy ==
The Southern Tang and its neighbors were relatively prosperous compared to regimes successively in control of the Central Plains. The greater agricultural productivity of the region created favorable conditions. Consistent tax revenues were secured with the growing disposable income of the populace. Interstate trading of specialized crafts like colored silks and salt reclaimed from the Huai River likewise was promoted by the Southern Tang.

Agricultural practices along the lower Yangtze River had undergone major modifications in the final years of the Tang dynasty. Irrigation and water management systems were more complex than in previous years. Intensive cultivation of rice was conducted in lowlands and adjacent reclaimed areas from waterways. Silk production developed into a regional cottage industry as farmers planted mulberry trees alongside their cereal crop. Meanwhile, in nearby piedmont areas agriculturalists became specialized in growing tea or textile plants like hemp (麻) or ramie (苧). These practices were in efflorescence during the Southern Tang, which created the most developed agricultural economy among the southern states. Rice farmers had better yields and in general had more disposable income than their predecessors. This led to more state revenue by taxes on cereal and cash crops.

Li Bian pursued the economic development of his realm through a number of fiscal policies. Song Qiqiu drafted many initiatives that focused on tax reform that were implemented. According to Sima Guang these were successful, as "the lands of Huai were fully planted, sericulture was widespread, and the [Southern Tang] state grew rich and strong." Mulberry trees (桑樹) were planted in large numbers in the Huai and Yangtze River basins. In May 939 farmers that had cultivated 3,000 or more in the past three years were given fifty bolts of silk from Li Bian's treasury. Payment of 20,000 copper cash was awarded to those that reclaimed at least 5 hectares (12 acres) of land. All new fields they cultivated were not taxed for 5 years. These measures have been credited with increasing agricultural production across the realm.

During the reign of Li Jing he authorized several military ventures that according to He Jainming incurred heavy financial burdens that inhibited further economic development of the Southern Tang realm. Tributes were paid to the Later Zhou once they defeated the Southern Tang in 958. After the Song dynasty was established in 960 these payments became exorbitant. Tribute to the Song incurred a downturn of the Southern Tang economy. After forcible incorporation into the Song Empire the former southern kingdoms became the focal point of the Chinese economy. Throughout their brief period of independence they had "laid the groundwork for the great economic surge that followed."

=== Coinage ===
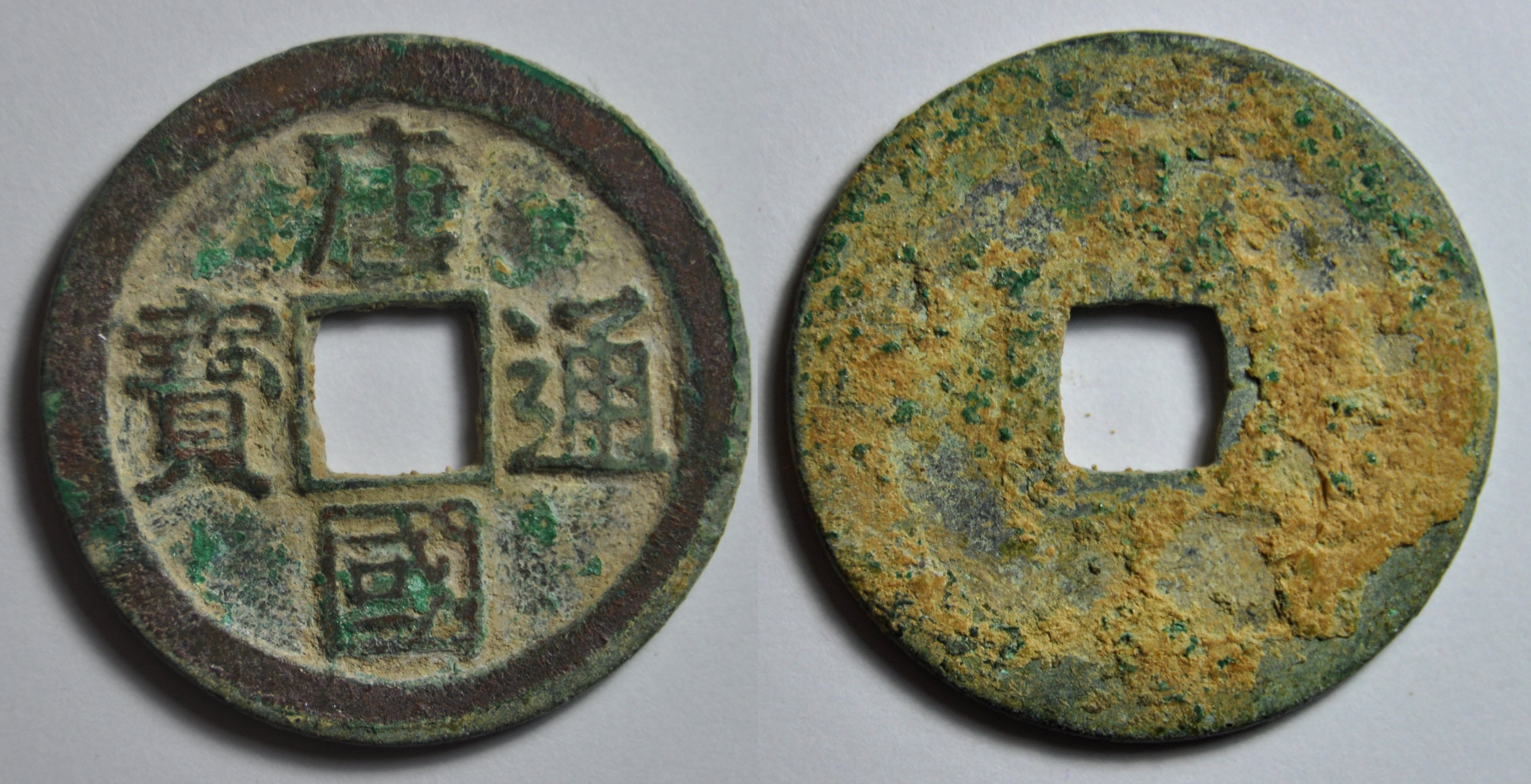
A Tangguo Tongbao (唐國通寶) cash coin with its inscription written in regular script.

Copper mining in the north was heavily disrupted by the constant warfare of the Five Dynasties and Ten Kingdoms era. In consequence bronze coins became scarce. The situation became dire in northern China. In 955 the Later Zhou Emperor Chai Rong banned the possession of bronze utensils upon pain of death. The Southern Tang and their neighbors minted coinage from clay, iron, or lead. These coins for domestic circulation (despite having minimal value intrinsically) and to prevent the export of precious bronze coinage to neighboring states.

Li Bian possibly cast a coin with the inscription Daqi Tongbao (大唐通寶) while the state still had its original name of Qi. During the reign of Li Jing several cash coins were created of different commercial value. Datang Tongbao (大唐通寶) and Tangguo Tongbao (唐國通寶) coins maintained the same inscription, size, and weight but used different fonts of Chinese calligraphy Yongtong Quanhuo (永通泉貨) coins were initially valued at 10 copper coins but counterfeits were widely circulated leading to distrust of them. Copper coins were still preferred by the populace, which caused a rapid depreciation of the newer coins. Kaiyuan Tongbao (開元通寶) coins that were created during the Tang dynasty remained in circulation. Li Yu later minted coins with the same inscription in clerical and seal scripts.

The Southern Tang were the first in Chinese history to issue vault protector coins, which served as numismatic charms. They were hung on red silk and tassels in the spirit hall of the Imperial Treasury for offerings to the gods of the Chinese pantheon, especially the Chinese God of Wealth.

== Culture ==
=== Artwork ===
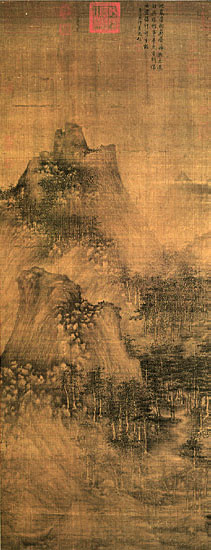
A landscape painting made by Dong Yuan on Pure Heart Hall paper of the Buddhist Kaixian Temple (開先寺) by the order of Li Yu.

The majority of Southern Tang court painters with surviving documentation were natives of Jiangnan. It is likely that the area had a potent artistic tradition before the formation of the Southern Tang. While most subjects were inherited, Southern Tang painters developed relatively new genres such as "landscape, ink bamboo, and flower-and-bird painting." Additionally they developed artwork focused on marine life. Their Tang predecessors apparently did not paint fish. Dong Yuan and his students developed a unique style of landscape painting known as the Southern School, which influence artists in the Song and Yuan dynasties. Sculptures crafted with detailed pictorial reliefs became widespread and surviving examples can be found at the Qixia Temple outside Nanjing.

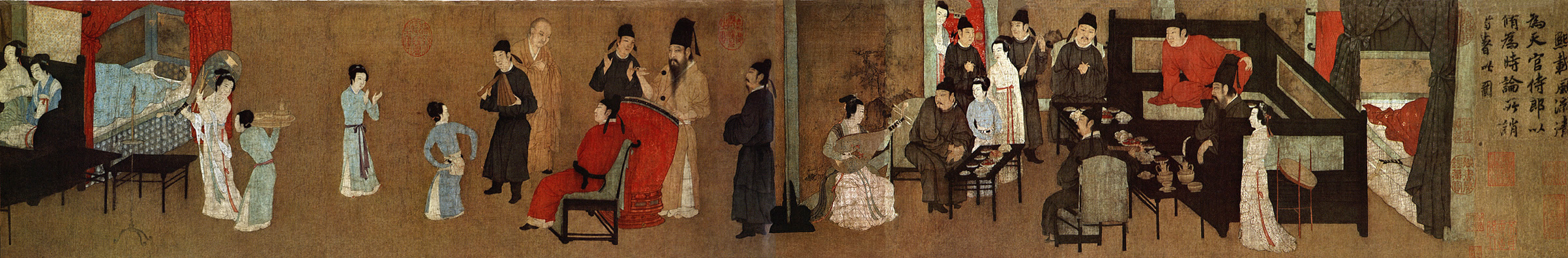
Night Revels of Han Xizai, first half. 12th century copy of an original by Gu Hongzhong (937–975)
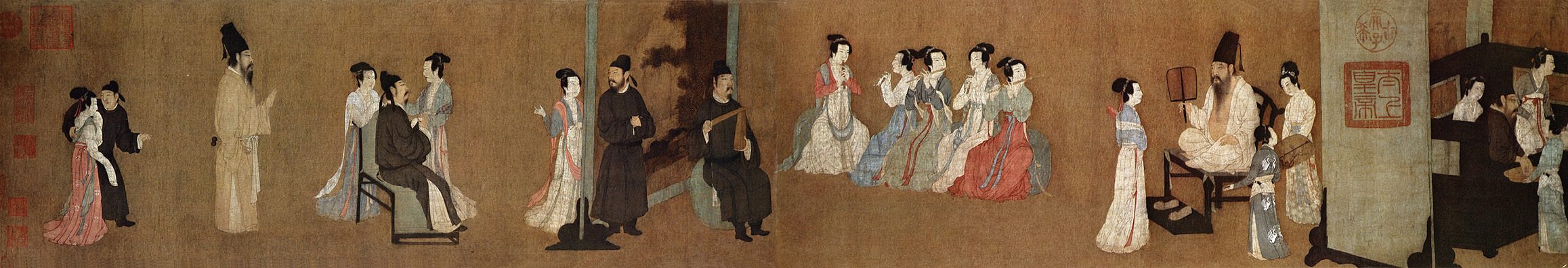
Night Revels of Han Xizai, second half.

The Hanlin Academy (翰林院) was founded in 943 and had large amounts of accomplished painters. There were only two other artistic academies in operation during the period. Those employed by the institution held hierarchical titles that denoted rank. The lowest ranked were likely apprentices to established artists. The Emperors of Southern Tang took part in the administration of the Hanlin Academy and oversaw the hiring of new painters. Wu Daozi and Zhou Fang were among the stylistic standards for Southern Tang painters. As successful artists took on apprenticeships the styles and genres popular with the Southern Tang court were likely transmitted to many artists outside the Hanlin Academy. In 975 the Song conquered the Southern Tang. Talented painters and poets were subsequently hired and brought to the Song capital.

=== Four Treasures of the Study ===
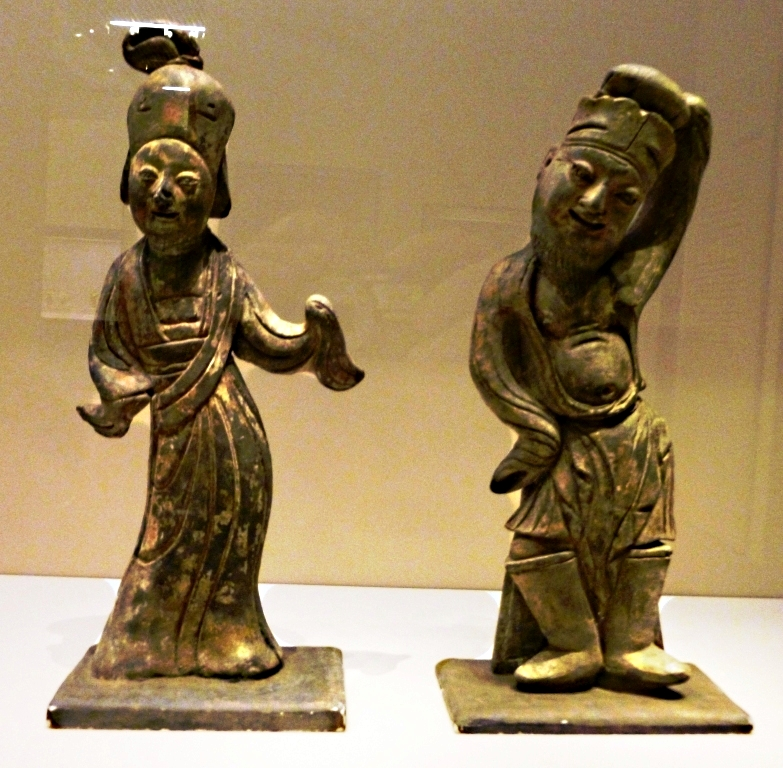
Pottery Dancers. 943 CE. From the tomb of Li Bian, founder of Southern Tang dynasty

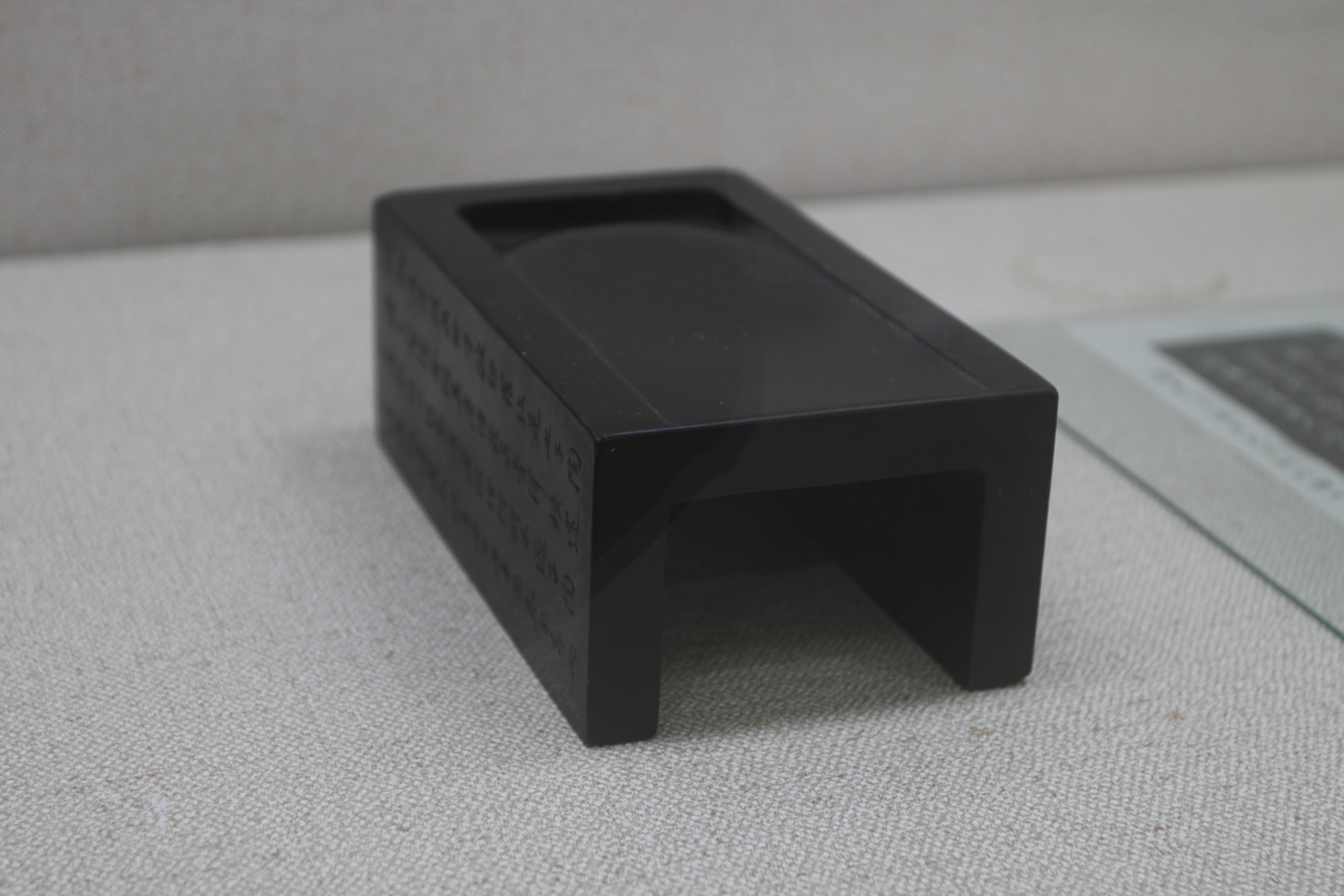
Dragon tail inkstone (龙尾砚) crafted during the Song dynasty.

The Four Treasures of the Study of the Southern Tang or Nan Tang Wenfang Sibao (南唐文房四寶) focused on brushes made by the Zhuge family, dragon tail inkstones (龙尾砚), inksticks crafted by Li Tinggui (李廷珪), and Pure Heart Hall paper (澄心堂紙). By the middle of the 11th century, the Four Treasures were appreciated by Song literati who amassed private collections of them. While Song literati noted the quality of writing instruments, they did not perceive the Southern Tang regime itself as exceptional.

Brushes produced by the Zhuge family of Xuanzhou were popular among the Southern Tang. Li Congqian (李從謙) of the imperial family in particular greatly cherished the brushes. They later received praise from Song literati like Mei Yaochen and Ouyang Xiu. Zhuge brushes kept a position of prominence until the mid-Northern Song era. The quality of Zhuge brushes began to decline. Song scholars developed a new calligraphic style of writing frame-less characters (無骨字) which required more flexible brushes than those made by the Zhuge family. Competing brush producers from other areas, especially from Huizhou, overtook the Zhuge brushes in popularity.

Dragon tail inkstones were another literary tool produced by the Southern Tang. They were made in the vicinity of Wuyuan. Li Jing established the Inkstone Bureau (硯務) to set annual quotas of their production. Skilled craftsmen that worked for the bureau received monthly salaries. Efforts were overseen by an Inkstone Officer (硯官). Dragon tail inkstones were prized possessions and offered as gifts among the Southern Tang literati, a tradition that continued into the Song dynasty. The most valued dragon tail inkstone contained minerals of a golden hue and were called jinxing yan (金星硯).

Emperor Zhenzong had a dragon tail inkstone among his collection, which provoked further interest in them by Song literati. Su Shi considered them second only to Phoenix beak inkstones (鳳咮硯), at point trading a bronze sword for a dragon tail inkstone. In the 13th century Yao Mian (姚勉) wrote a poem about a dragon tail inkstone once opened by Su Shi:

Its shape is round as the moon,
And its tripod feet are like a toad's.
It was the dragon tail inkstone from the dark jade bank.
And was once appreciated by Su Shi in a snowy hall.

— Yao Mian (姚勉), Longwei yan ming (龍尾硯銘), Yao Mian ji (姚勉集) vol. 42

During the late Tang dynasty Xi Nai (奚鼐) established himself as a prominent inkstick manufacturer in Hebei. His son Xi Chao (奚超) migrated to Shezhou to escape the continual instability of the period. There the family utilized Huangshan pine trees to produce huimo (徽墨) inksticks. The highest quality were produced by Xi Chao's son, Xi Tinggui, whose skill was recognized by Li Yu. The Southern Tang ruler bestowed his family name (Li) to the Xi family in honor of their craftsmanship. Now called Li Tinggui, his products became known as Li Tinggui mo (李廷珪墨 "Li Tinggui Ink"), while those made by his relatives were called Lishi mo (李氏墨 "Li Family Ink").

Initial Song emperors did not value Lishi mo and used it as a source of paint for restoration projects. It was not until the reign of Emperor Renzong that Lishi mo and Li Tinggui mo in particular were recognized for their quality. Emperors gave them as presents to their scholars. Cai Xiang created a collection of Lishi mo made by four generations of the Li family. Emperor Shenzong rewarded the polymath Su Song with Li Tinggui mo for his scholarly pursuits. Li Tinggui's ink remained the standard to which other inksticks were compared until the reign of Emperor Huizong.

An important paper medium for the Southern Tang was Pure Heart Hall paper. During the Tang dynasty generations of Jiangnan craftsmen developed their skills and artistic talent in creating paper. These trends were used by their successors in the Southern Tang to create Pure Heart Hall paper. This distinctive paper became the official paper for royal proclamations. Only privileged officials were given any for use in creating government documents. Pure Heart Hall paper retained its importance throughout the Southern Tang, it was so prized that it was not sold in marketplaces. After the Song defeated the Southern Tang a multitude of imitation Pure Heart Hall papers appeared as the process for creating genuine articles had become lost.

Song literati began to value Pure Heart Hall paper after a gathering of notable scholars that included Liu Ban (劉攽), Mei Yaochen, Ouyang Xiu, Su Shi, noted its quality in poetic works. Ouyang Xiu later gifted Mei Yaochen two scrolls of Pure Heart Hall paper for calligraphy. Song painters utilized the paper for their artwork. Li Gonglin in particular only used Pure Heart Hall paper for his compositions.

=== Cuisine ===
Among the culinary options available in the Southern Tang was a pastry called yunying chao (雲英麨). It was often given as a gift during celebrations. Yunying chaowas made from ground melon and a medley of flower bulbs and corms: lilies (百合), lotus (蓮), arrowhead (慈姑), fox nuts (雞頭), taro (芋), and two kinds of water chestnuts, 荸薺 and 菱. The mixture was steamed, sweetened with honey and then sliced into pieces. The dish continued to be made during the Song dynasty.

== Foreign relations ==
The foreign policy maintained by Li Bian has been described as maintaining a "martial conservatism." He recruited disaffected officials exiled from the north who found his realm to have bountiful resources. This made some of the newcomers contemplate its ability to expand territorially. The perceived need for Li Bian to prove his legitimacy through military conquest likewise motivated many Southern Tang officials.

Li Bian however felt it was sensible to foster friendly relations with the other southern states. He dispatched ambassadors to the neighboring states of Jingnan, Min, Southern Han, and Wuyue on 21 November 937 to announce his assumption of the throne. By spring of the following year all four states had sent their own envoys to congratulate Li Bian on becoming emperor. Thus began interactions between the Southern Tang and their neighboring and often competing states.

In 941 Li Bian held meetings with his officials about the geopolitical position of the Southern Tang. He felt if the Southern Tang were to invade Wuyue, then the Later Jin would surely launch a counter-attack to protect their vassal. While the Min Kingdom was much easier to conquer, it was also likely to be a financial burden and source of disorder. Both states were much more useful as buffers against the North than areas of expansion. If a propitious opportunity arose to strike the "usurpers and thieves" in control of the Central Plains he declared he would act. After their defeat the Imperial Court would relocate to Chang'an and rebuild the dilapidated city. The restored Tang Empire would then encourage the remaining Southern states to recognize their legitimate rule and submit.

Officials pushed for attacking the Later Jin. Li Bian refused to engage in a conflict at that time as he felt it was inopportune:

"As a child I grew up in the army and saw the profound damage soldiers did to the people. I cannot bear to hear words about this again. When I leave other people alone and in peace, then my people will be in peace as well. Why do you ask me to start a war then!"

Unlike his father Li Jing pursued territorial expansion against neighboring states. In 945 the Min Kingdom was conquered, although the Wuyue gained control of the prosperous port city Fuzhou. Chu was subjugated in 951 but much of the state was lost in a rebellion against the deeply unpopular Southern Tang administration.

According to Sima Guang these initially successful campaigns against Chu and Min made Li Jing grow an "ambition for the empire." Xuan Xu recorded in the Jiangnan Lu that certain officials sent requests to the Imperial Court for the Southern Tang "to secure the four quarters" (經營四方) through military conquest. These typically disastrous schemes were formed by certain officials keen on creating opportunities for their own advancement.

=== Five Dynasties ===
The term "Five Dynasties" was coined by Song dynasty historians and reflects the view that the successive regimes based in Bian possessed the Mandate of Heaven.

Compared to regimes of the Central Plains, the Southern Tang were economically prosperous. This created bottlenecks for any army advancing north as long supply trains were required. The Southern Tang military utilized a combination of infantry and naval forces, while cavalry was seldom employed. However, in the open Central Plains cavalry forces held the advantage. Peter A. Lorge concluded that these circumstances made Southern Tang campaigns into the Central Plains logisitically challenging.

Hino Kaisaburō has detailed the principle routes used for inland economic and diplomatic exchanges between northern and southern Chinese states. These were the Grand Canal, Gan River, and Xiang River. Control of the Grand Canal was divided between several states, therefore it was the least used route in the era.

==== Later Jin ====
In 936 Shi Jingtang secured an alliance with the Yelü Deguang to overthrow his brother-in-law Li Congke of the Later Tang with Khitan forces. He ceded the Sixteen Prefectures, promised annual tribute, and accepted a subordinate role to Yelü Deguang. In return the Khitan ruler appointed Shi Jingtang as Emperor of the Later Jin. Throughout his reign Shi Jingtang maintained amicable relations with his overlord, despite criticism from many officials.

In the summer of 938 Song Qiqiu proposed for the assassination of a Khitan dignitary that was visiting the Southern Tang court when they returned north through Later Jin territory. He felt that the murder could provoke a war between the Later Jin and the Khitans. While successful in killing the envoy, the harmonious relations between the Later Jin and Khitan continued.

In 940 the Southern Tang supported backed a rebellion in the Later Jin territory Anyuan. Li Bian broke his policy of maintaining peaceable relations with neighboring states in a campaign that ultimately ended in Southern Tang failure. The military commissioner of Anyuan, Li Jinquan, contacted the Southern Tang with an offer to change allegiance from the Later Jin to the Southern Tang realm. Li Bian accepted the offer and sent an army northwards.

Southern Tang forces met up with Li Jinquan as planned. But against Li Bian's commands its commanders ordered the looting Anlu. Afterwards, the Southern Tang army began to return home. Later Jin forces eventually caught up to the sluggish Southern Tang army and decisively defeated them in Mahuang Valley. The disobedience of his commanders upset Li Bian greatly. In a letter to Shi Jingtang, he claimed his generals were uncontrollable, as they were keen on career advancement through combat, and pressed for amicable relations. Thus, ended Southern Tang pretensions to the Central Plains for the time being.

Under the influence of Jing Yanguang, the second Later Jin Emperor Shi Chonggui pursued an antagonistic course with his overlord Yelü Deguang. This incensed the Khitan ruler who launched an invasion and defeated Shi Conggui in 946.

==== Later Han ====
By 947 Liu Zhiyuan had evicted the Khitan forces and established the Later Han dynasty.

Based in modern Yuncheng, Shanxi, the Later Han military governor of Huguo Circuit (護國), Li Shouzhen, revolted in the summer of 948. He sent envoys to Jinling in the hopes of securing an attack on the Later Han's southern flank. Li Jing was amenable to an intervention and dispatched an army under Li Jinquan from the Huai River. This force reached modern Shandong, encamping across the Yi River from Linyi. One evening Later Han forces appeared and attempted to encircle the Southern Tang base. Li Jinquan was able to lead a retreat to the port of Haizhou with his forces intact. His inaction against the Later Han perturbed Li Jing that Li Lingquan never held another active military posting.

After the ignominious withdrawal Li Jing contacted Liu Chengyou calling for the resumption of trade between the Southern Tang and Later Han. This request was denied and the two states continued to clash in border conflicts throughout 949. In March an army of 10,000 was sent across the border into modern Anhui. Later Han rebel groups operating there were receptive to accepting Southern Tang rule. While stationed there a Southern Tang army captured Mengcheng. The Southern Tang commander hesitated when a Later Han army arrived and called for a retreat back to the Huai River. Later that year another army was sent to seize territory across the Huai River. The campaign focused on Zhengyang, a city of strategic importance due to the ease of crossing the Huai River there. As in previous attempts of expanding north the Southern Tang army suffered a defeat from Later Han forces and retreated to the Huai River.

==== Later Zhou ====
In March 951 the Later Zhou Emperor Guo Wei decreed in an edict to regulate contact with the Southern Tang:

"We have no hostile intentions towards the Tang. Both of us station troops along the Huai River, and both of us protect our border regions. We will not permit our troops and people to enter Tang territory illegally. Merchants can travel to and fro, and there will be no restrictions on trade."

The Southern Tang were initially able to export their tea, salt, and silk without impediment to the Central Plains. Additionally the positive relations allowed the Southern Tang to pursue the conquest of Chu without Later Zhou interference. This period of peaceable interactions quickly deteriorated as Guo Wei enforced his will over northern China.

In 952 a member of the deposed Later Han imperial family, Murong Yanchao, revolted against the Later Zhou. He was able to court military intervention from the Northern Han and the Southern Tang although neither actually provided much assistance. At the time the Southern Tang were experiencing great difficulty in securing their recent conquests in the kingdom of Chu. Their unpopular administration provoked provincial revolts. The Southern Han meanwhile began an invasion to secure Lingnan. These military pressures likely explain why Li Jing only sent 5,000 troops to assist Murong Yanchao. The Southern Tang army reached Xiapi before Later Zhou resistance was met. Pushed south of Xuzhou, the Southern Tang lost a pitched battle and lost over 1,000 troops. Despite this failure, court officials pushed for conquering the Later Zhou. Han Xizai advised strongly against the idea as he felt Guo Wei was in a position of power. Li Jing ultimately concurred and ceased hostilities.

In spring 955 Emperor Chai Rong was advised to strike the lengthy and porous Southern Tang border. Simultaneously Southern Tang defensive procedures were reduced along the seasonally shallow Huai River in winter 955, leaving their border easy to cross. Later Zhou forces advanced south and constructed a floating bridge to cross the Huai River at Zhengyang and began the invasion of Huainan in early 956. The crucially important city of Shouchun became encircled by the Later Zhou but resisted them for 14 months. Throughout the conflict incompetent military officers made critical errors that ended in a string of costly defeats for the Southern Tang. By April 958 Shouchun had fallen and the Later Zhou were advancing upon the capital of Jinling. The Southern Tang offered to cede all territory north of the Yangtze to the Later Zhou and become a vassal. The Later Zhou gained control over Huainan and almost a quarter million families.

=== Ten Kingdoms ===
Leadership across the Ten Kingdoms did not see a politically unified China under a centralized bureaucracy as necessarily inevitable. Their sovereignty was revoked only through force of arms. Conceptually there could only be one Son of Heaven but regional autonomy was still possible. Some kingdoms nominally accepted the suzerianity of the Five Dynasties. Several rulers simultaneously claimed to be emperors and still engaged in diplomatic exchanges with each other despite this breach of imperial orthodoxy.

==== Min ====
Wang Yanxi sent Zhu Wenjin in 938 to represent the Min court and praised Li Bian for his assumption of the throne. In January 940 Min representatives renewed arrangements previously made with the Southern Tang.

Throughout the early 940s the Min Emperor Wang Yanxi faced strife with his rebellious brother Wang Yanzheng. In 943 Wang Yanzheng seized the northwest regions of Min and formed the Kingdom of Yin. By February 945 Wang Yanxin had died and Wang Yanzheng reunited Min. The Southern Tang invaded soon afterwards. On 2 October 945 Jianzhou fell and Wang Yangzheng was captured. The majority of Min territory was now under Southern Tang rule.

Li Renda controlled the affluent port of Fuzhou. He initially submitted to Li Jing but was attacked after Southern Tang officials fabricated orders for his surrender. Li Renda appealed to Qian Hongzuo of Wuyue for aid. Throughout winter 946 and spring 947 Wuyue forces arrived on naval transports to protect their new vassal. The Wuyue and Fuzhou garrison killed over 20,000 Southern Tang troops. The siege was lifted and the war soon came to a close.

The conflict had incurred many expenses and for the Southern Tang and drained their treasury. The Southern Tang gained control of the Jianzhou and Tingzhou prefectures, while the Wuyue secured the area around Fuzhou. Control over the coastal prefectures of Quanzhou and Zhangzhou by Liu Congxiao was recognized by the Southern Tang, who appointed him Qingyuan Jiedushi. This vassal state maintained de facto autonomy from the Southern Tang until forcible incorporation into the Song dynasty three decades later.

==== Wuyue ====
The Wuyue had antagonistic relations with Wu and several conflicts occurred between the latter's pretensions to Min territory. The rulers of Wuyue maintained a status of vassal to the Northern dynasties as this protected them against Wu and later Southern Tang aggression. If attacked, their northern suzerians could strike at Southern Tang territories along the Huai River. This kept the Southern Tang and Wuyue in a state of equilibrium.

When Li Bian sent messengers announcing his assumption to the throne; the Wuyue were the first to send their congratulations. In January 941 emissaries presented gifts from Wuyue to celebrate Li Bian's birthday. In August 941 the Wuyue capital of Hangzhou was devastated by fires. The ensuing chaos greatly distressed Qian Yuanguan, who died soon afterwards. Southern Tang military officers pushed for an invasion to seize Wuyue. Li Bian demurred to the idea: "How can I take advantage of the calamity of other people?" Instead, an army from Li Bian sent out foodstuffs for the beleaguered people of Hangzhou. An opportune time to strike at a major rival of the Southern Tang was therefore passed over. Dialogue between the two states apparently ended in 942 due to their mutual contentions over Min.

The Wuyue Kingdom in 978, before incorporation into the Song dynasty

Wuyue became entangled in the Southern Tang conquest of Min. They sent forces to Fuzhou throughout winter 946 and spring 947. The combined forces of the Fuzhou garrison and Wuyue army defeated the Southern Tang in the Battle of Fuzhou. Subsequently, Fuzhou joined the Wuyue domain as a vassal. The Wuyue participated in the Later Zhou invasion of the Southern Tang. In 956 armies were sent capture Changzhou Xuanzhou. Changzhou was put under siege but the Wuyue army suffered heavy losses against a Southern Tang relief force. This defeat made the Wuyue army sent against Xuanzhou retreat before reaching the city. The Wuyue did not try attacking the Southern Tang again until 958 when Later Zhou victory was apparent. 20,000 troops were sent to assist in the final stages of the campaign.

Li Yu pleaded for military assistance from Qian Chu At the beginning of the Song conquest of Southern Tang. The Wuyue ruler instead forwarded the letter to Emperor Taizu. Quan Chu joined his suzerain in attacking the Southern Tang. Changzhou and Runzhou were seized. Wuyue forces joined the Song siege of Jinling.

==== Chu ====
To secure his uncertain position Ma Xi'e became a vassal of the Southern Tang in 951. Bian Hao and a 10,000 strong Tang force was sent to the Chu capital of Tanzhou. Ma Xi'e invited them into the city but was deposed in December 951. The majority of Chu territory was now in Southern Tang possession. Officials argued that Bian Hao needed to be replaced due to his incompetence, or the former Chu realm would be lost. Li Jing however took no heed. Liu Yan gathered a coalition of former Chu troops and launched attacks on Southern Tang positions across Hunan. Bian Hao fled Tanzhou on 1 December 952. Liu Yan submitted to the Later Zhou in order to protect against a potentially revanchist Southern Tang. Thus Li Jing's effort to control Hunan ended in an embarrassing rout.

==== Southern Han ====
The Southern Han sent envoys in 940 to reconfirm agreements made with Southern Tang. In 941 the Southern Han proposed for the partition of the Chu realm. However, Li Bian was unwilling to commit to the enterprise. The same year they sent gifts to celebrate Li Bian's birthday.

Taking advantage of the Southern Tang invasion of Chu, in winter 951 Liu Sheng launched a successful invasion to secure Lingnan. The Southern Tang counterattack ended in failure and the Southern Han secured their territorial gains.

=== Liao dynasty ===
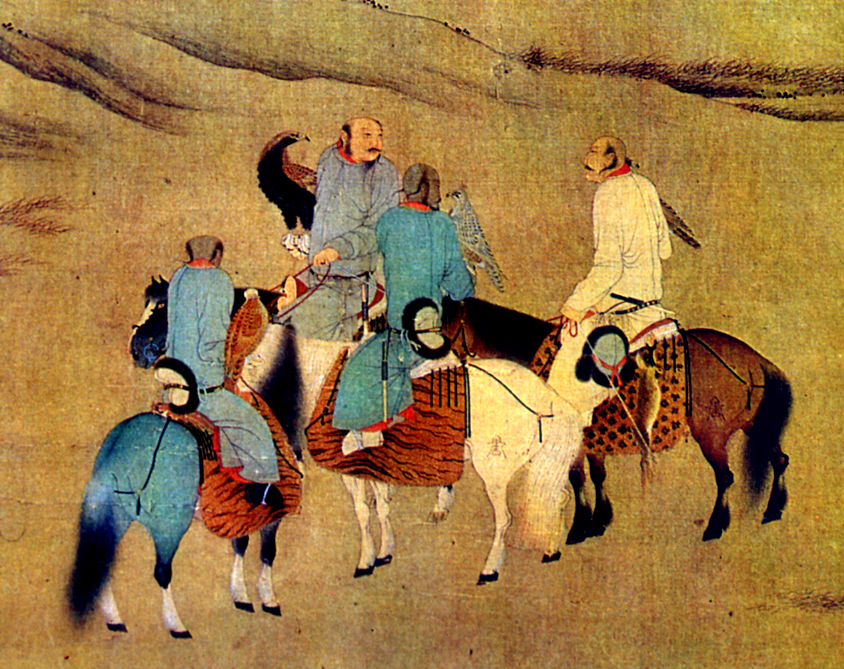
Khitan riders hunting with eagles. Painting by Hu Gui (胡瓌), 10th century

The Khitan were an important partner for the Southern Tang. Positive relations were used to counter the threat posed by the Central Plains regimes and their Wuyue vassal. Dialog and gift exchanges were frequent during Li Bian's rule. He sent ambassadors to the Khitan court at Shangjing to announce the start of his reign. In correspondence Yelü Deguang and Li Bian referred to each other as brothers. This demonstrated the favorable opinion the Khitan held of the southern state compared to the reigning Later Tang.

In 938 both Yelü Deguang and his brother Yelü Lihu dispatched gifts to Li Bian. Later that year a group of Khitan envoys visited with an impressive herd of 35,000 sheep and 300 horses. In return for the livestock the Khitan received medicinal supplies, silk, and tea. The Southern Tang court financed a piece called "Two Qidan Bringing Tribute" by an unnamed artist in honor of these proceedings. The painting symbolized the importance put on relations with the Khitan by Li Bian.

Contact between the two states was blocked by the Central Plains regimes. Consequently, a naval route was developed. Starting at Chunzhou Southern Tang ships sailed north along the coastline until the Shandong Peninsula, where ships crossed the Yellow Sea and landed at the Liaodong Peninsula. The Khitans sent six diplomatic missions to the Southern Tang between 938 and 943. In 940 Khitan envoys presented Li a snow-fox fur robe. In both 941 and 942 the Southern Tang sent three diplomatic missions to the Khitans.

After being insulted by an antagonistic Shi Chonggui, Yelü Deguang destroyed the Later Jin in 946. In early 947 he founded the Liao dynasty as Emperor Taizong after entering Bian. Shortly afterwards Taizong offered Li Jing to become the "ruler of the Central Plains." This proposal was rejected, potentially due to the Southern Tang considering themselves culturally superior to the Khitan. Receiving the Central Plains, rather than conquering it, would have left the legitimacy of the Southern Tang far from certain.

Nonetheless, Li Jing praised Taizong of Liao for dethroning the Later Jin and petitioned him to allow the Southern Tang to repair the dilapidated Imperial Tang tombs of Chang'an. The request was denied and greatly infuriated Li Jing who then ordered meetings to formulate an invasion of the Central Plains. Han Xizai advised the Southern Tang Emperor to capture Bian at this time:

"If your Majesty wants to revive your ancestors' enterprise, then the right time is now. Once the ruler of the slaves has returned to the north, and another ruler has appeared in the Central Plains, it will not be as easy to realize."

Despite the motions made by the Khitan in founding an imperial dynasty, they treated the conquest as a "very large scale raid." Taizong soon departed for the Khitan homeland in March 947 and died on the journey Meanwhile, the Southern Tang were embroiled in a war of conquest against Min. This left them unable to effectively pursue a northern invasion. The campaign ended successfully late in 947. By this point however Liu Zhiyuan had already captured Bian from the Khitan and founded the Later Han dynasty. The opportunity to move against the north had been missed by the Southern Tang.

Efforts by the Southern Tang to secure an alliance with the Liao against the northern dynasties continued to flounder. In 948 Liao and Southern Tang officials formulated a joint attack against the Later Han. Yet the Liao delayed for over a year. Once they did attack the Later Han, Khitan forces only raided Hebei.

When Muzong took the Liao throne, securing aid became more difficult for the Southern Tang. He was far less interested in participating in Chinese affairs than his predecessors. In 955 the Later Zhou began a campaign to subdue the Southern Tang. Li Jing requested military intervention by Muzong. His brother-in-law was sent to Tanzhou as an envoy to the Southern Tang in 959. The Liao were treated to a sumptuous feast by their Southern Tang hosts. Spies loyal to the Later Zhou were among those present. Muzong's brother-in-law was beheaded by the Later Zhou spies. The Liao court was unaware that the Later Zhou perpetrated the murder. Muzong furiously revoked all contact with Li Jing, ending Liao-Southern Tang relations.

=== Goryeo ===
In 936 Taejo united the Korean Peninsula under Goryeo. The newly formed state bordered the Khitans. The Later Jin reigned as a Khitan vassal which made them undesirable to the Koreans. The strategic position of Goryeo was likely valued by the Southern Tang as a means to threaten the Khitan. Taejo sent a tribute mission to the Southern Tang in the summer of 938. A variety of locally produced goods were presented to Li Bian. Another mission from the Korean Peninsula arrived at Jinling in 938. The group was likely private traders from the recently conquered Silla. A later mission from Goryeo brought more goods as tribute in 940.

== Decline ==
By the close of Li Jing's reign the Southern Tang was well on the way to obscurity. He had pursued a number of foreign adventures managed by incompetent military officers that generally ended in costly disaster. From 955 to 988 the Later Zhou successfully campaigned against the Southern Tang. Li Jing was forced to cede all prefectures north of the Yangtze River and become a Later Zhou tributary. The realm became territorially truncated and lost the economic and political relevance it enjoyed when Li Jing assumed the throne 15 years earlier.

In February 960 Zhao Kuangyin deposed Guo Zongxun and established the Song dynasty as Emperor Taizu. Li Jing quickly sent envoys to confirm his loyalty and vassalage to Taizu. Taizu pursued an expansionist agenda to unite China under his rule. Jiangnan was not a tactical priority compared to other states and was left alone in return for considerable tribute. In August 961 Li Jing died and his son Li Yu took over.

Li Yu kept a semi-independent status but came at a steep price of consistent tribute of gold, silver, and silk. Jiangnan was significantly smaller than the Southern Tang territorial apex achieved in the 950s. This made the large quotas demanded by the Song challenging to meet. In 964 the Song decreed new economic regulations that made the situation even more dire. Northern merchants were forbidden travel into Jiangnan. New commodity taxes were imposed in Jiangnan that could only be paid in gold or silver.

The Later Shu were crushed in 965 by Taizu. In 971 the Southern Han were likewise conquered by the Song. Taizu now turned his attention to Jiangnan. Throughout 973 and 974 Li Yu was repeatedly summoned to the Song court. He feigned illness and claimed to be unable to make the trip. Tired of these excuses, Taizu raised an invasion force under the command of Cao Bin to extinguish Jiangnan.

The campaign began in November 974 and proceeded favorably for the Song. The Yangtze River was overcome with a floating bridge built across from Caishiji. Song forces crossed the waterway and secured a bridgehead. Outside Caishiji an army of 20,000 Jiangnan troops was defeated by Cao Bin. Song forces continued to advance and reached the outskirts of Jinling in March 975. No defensive preparations were made by Li Yu. Both he and his court officials foolishly felt existing fortifications were adequate enough to keep the Song at bay. Starting in April the capital was put under siege by Cao Bin.

In January 976 Li Yu surrendered outside his palace. He and his remaining courtiers kneeled down at the feet of Cao Bin. The deposed ruler reached Bian in February. The imperial portrait of Li Bian produced by Zhou Wenju was presented to Taizu. This measure signified the complete submission of Jiangnan to the Song. Jiangnan was formally annexed and dissolved by the Song. The newly incorporated territories had 650,565 registered families. Lu Jiang acting Military Governor of Zhaowu Circuit continued to resist Song army after seizing She Prefecture before persuaded to surrender; Jiangnan general Hu Ze who was stationed at Jiang Prefecture refused to surrender to Song and continued to resist until his failure in May. In 978 Li Yu died probably from actual illness, rather than being poisoned on the command of Taizu as some accounts claim.

== Historiography ==
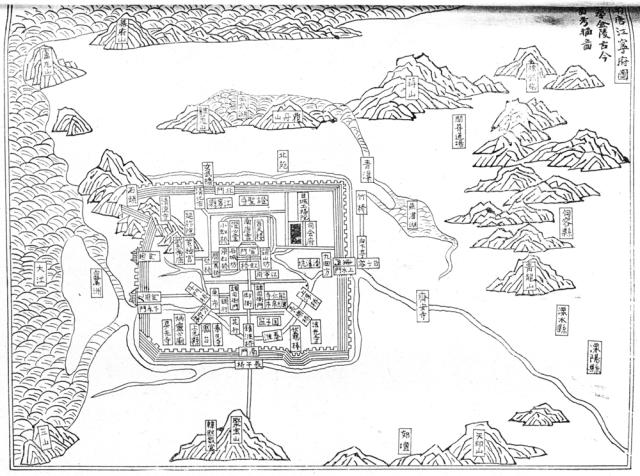
Ming dynasty depiction of Nanjing when it was the Southern Tang capital.

Song historians tended to favor presenting the Five Dynasties as passing on the mandate of heaven in a linear fashion to the succeeding dynasty. The Song were at the end of this process, gaining the mandate from the Later Zhou. This logic, which did not factor the Southern Tang or other states, was critical to Song claims of legitimacy. Other states of the period were seen as not in possession of the mandate and therefore entirely illegitimate. Song histographers likewise disregarded the Southern Tang and its potential "as a southern alternative to empire building."

The Jiu Wudai Shi was released in 974 and is the earliest work to deal with the Southern Tang. It was composed to justify Song political pretensions. Li Yu still ruled as a vassal of Taizu and so was excluded from the work. The Southern Tang was denounced as a state of "usurpation and thievery" or jianqie 僭竊. Rulers were generally referred to using the word (偽) to label them as swindlers. Despite these ideological attacks, the work accurately recorded political events between the Central Plain dynasties and the Southern Tang.

The Jiangnan lu 江南錄 was written on the order of Emperor Taizong, the successor and younger brother of Taizu. He had a keen interest in the Southern Tang, whose final ruler Li Yu had been dethroned at the beginning of 976. Southern Tang governmental documents remained unprocessed when Taizong ascended to the Song throne later that year. Li Yu was posthumously granted the title prince of Wu (吳王) by Taizong in 978. This was the same title once held by Li Ke, the supposed ancestor of the Southern Tang house. Taizong probably saw it possible to claim to be the legitimate successor of the Tang through transmission from Li Yu and the Southern Tang.

The Jiangnan lu was drafted by Tang Yue (湯悅) and Xu Xuan, both prominent members of the former Southern Tang government, to further the goal of connecting Taizong to the Southern Tang. It likely did not achieve more than a minor circulation. By the 980s Taizong was more firmly in power and the text its significance as a source for him to claim legitimacy. The Jiangnan lu has been lost besides several passages existing in largely hostile sources. Xu Xuan was criticized by various scholars of the era for incorrectly depicting events that occurred in the Southern Tang. The author of the Diaoji litan accused Xu Xuan of blaming other officials for his own ruinous policies. The Jiangbiao Zhi by Zheng Wenbao and the Jiangnan Bielu by Chen Pengnian both in a partisan manner to fix these supposed errors. Later historians like Wang Anshi and Ouyang Xiu likewise critiqued the Jiangnan lu. Hostility to Xu Xuan by other Song historians likely came from a combination of his social prominence and prior service to the Southern Tang.

The Diaoji litan 釣磯立談 was composed by a private citizen of the Southern Tang after its conquest by the Song. In the work the author defended the legacy of the Southern Tang. The Tang-Song interregnum was conceived as a period where competing states potentially had a limited mandate of heaven. They called the Southern Tang a "peripheral hegemonic state" 偏霸. An account was given of the Southern Tang geopolitical position and its plans for unifying China. By utilizing this terminology and logic the author disputed the negative status given to the Southern Tang by Song historians.

The Zizhi Tongjian is an authoritative historical text published in 1084 that remains an important source for Chinese historiography. Sima Guang oversaw and edited the compilation that covered 1,300 years of Chinese history. Leaders of the southern states that claimed the title of emperor were instead referred to as "ruler" (主). The final chapters of the Zizhi Tongjian deal with the Southern Tang. They provide significant amount of information about the state. Sima Guang opined that conquering the north was beyond the capabilities of the Southern Tang. Contemporary scholars have noted that the personal biases of Sima Guang at times removed a sense of objectivity in the text. The ideological stances of the Zizhi Tongjian greatly influenced subsequent Song historiography, and are still prominent in modern scholarship.

The Wudai shiji largely followed the Zizhi Tongjian in its treatment of the Southern Tang. However, the work has been seen as less accurate by contemporary scholars. In the work Ouyang defined the histographical concept of the Ten Kingdoms (十國). He also wrote a treatise on political legitimacy, determining that the principal factor lay in controlling a unified Chinese state. He laid out how to determine the legitimacy of a regime without necessarily giving into personal or cultural biases. He postulated that there were interregnums where no authority was necessarily legitimate.

In 1355 Yang Weizhen wrote an essay critiquing the recently published Song shi. In it he questioned the prevailing belief that the Southern Tang were not a legitimate political entity. He recorded statements from Taizu and Qubilai that supposedly demonstrated the importance of controlling Southern China to acquire political legitimacy. Neither quotation appears in any other historical sources, making them of doubtful authenticity.

=== "Five Demons" ===
The Song political experiences influenced the depiction of the Southern Tang in their historical works. During the reign of Emperor Zhenzhong a group of financial and political reformists were derided as the "Five Demons" by opposing interest groups. This designation was later employed by Song historians to describe xiaoren 小人 officials that made a faction to illicitly gain power in the Southern Tang government. Membership in this ostensible group varies somewhat between the sources. It was however almost always affiliated with Song Qiqiu in some capacity. The existence of this supposed faction has been critiqued by Johannes Kurz as a product of the personal biases of Song historians and their deliberate rearrangement of historical materials.

The Diaoji litan was the first work to employ the term. The claimed members of this group were Song Qiqiu, Chen Jue, Feng Yanji, Feng Yanlu, and Zha Wenhui 查文徽. While some men included did act for self-aggrandisement there is not an obvious reason to consider them operating as a cohesive unit. Ma Ling detailed eight men operating as a faction; Song Qiqiu, Chen Jue, Li Zhenggu 李徵古, Feng Yanlu, Feng Yansi, Wei Cen 魏岑, and Zha Wenhui. The Jiangnan Yeshi depicted Song Qiqiu as starting as an honest official that eventually became corrupt. Notably he is not recorded as affiliated with any supposed political faction nor that he established one. In the Wudau Shiji Wei Cen replaces Song Qiqiu as a member of the Five Demons, although the latter reportedly controlled the group through Chen Jue. This purported arrangement was also reported in the Zizhi Tongjian.

== Rulers ==
'Sovereigns in Southern Tang Kingdom 937–975
Temple Names	Personal Names	Period of Reigns	Reign periods and dates
Liezu (烈祖 Liè Zǔ)	李昪 Lǐ Biàn	937–943	Shengyuan (昇元 Shēng Yuán) 937–943
Yuanzong (元宗 Yuán Zōng)	李璟 Lǐ Jǐng	943–961	Baoda (保大 Bǎo Dà) 943–958; Jiaotai (交泰 Jiāo Tài) 958; Zhongxing (中興 Zhōng Xīng) 958
Houzhu (後主 Hòu Zhǔ)	李煜 Lǐ Yù	961–975	(Under Li Yu, the Southern Tang did not have its own reign periods)

== Southern Tang and Wu rulers family tree ==
Southern Tang and Wu

– Wu emperors; – Southern Tang emperors

Yang Xingmi 杨行密 874–905; Taizu 太祖 902–905	Xu Wen 徐溫 862–927; Yizu 義祖
Yang Wo 杨渥 886–908; Liezu 烈祖 (905–)907–908	Yang Longyan; 897–920; Gaozu 高祖; 908–920	Yang Pu 杨溥 900–938; Ruidi 睿帝; 920–937	Li Bian 李昪 888–943; Liezu 烈祖; 937–943	Xú Zhīxùn (elder) 徐知訓 d. 918	Xú Zhīxùn (younger) 徐知詢 d. 934; Kang of Donghai 東海康王
Yang Lian 杨琏 d. 940; Jing of Hongnong 弘農靖王	Princess; Yongxing 永兴公主; 917–940	Princess; Shangrao 上饶公主 d. 937	Xu Jingqian 徐景遷 919–937; Ding of Chu 楚定王	Li Jing 李璟 916–961; Yuanzong 元宗; 943–961	Li Jingsui 李景遂 920–958; Cr. Prince Wencheng 文成太弟	Li Jingda 李景達 924–971; Cr. Prince Zhaoxiao 昭孝太弟
Li Yu 李煜 937–978; Houzhu 后主; 961–975

== Bibliography ==
=== Premodern sources ===
- Tao Gu 陶穀 (n.d.e). Qīngyì lù (in Chinese) – via Wikisource.
- Guang, Sima (1084). Zīzhì Tōngjiàn (in Chinese) – via Wikisource.
- Ji, Yun (1798). Sìkù Quánshū Zǒngmù Tíyào (in Chinese) – via Wikisource.
- Li, Tao (1193). Xù Zīzhì Tōngjiàn Chángbiān (in Chinese) – via Wikisource.
- Lu, You 陸游 (1184). Lù Shì Nán Táng Shū (in Chinese) – via Wikisource.
- Ling, Ma 馬令 (n.d.e). Mǎ Shì Nán Táng Shū (in Chinese) – via Wikisource.
- Ouyang, Xiu (1073). Wǔdài Shǐjì (in Chinese) – via Wikisource.
- Ouyang, Xiu (n.d.e). Ōuyáng xiū jí (in Chinese) – via Wikisource.
- Renchen, Wu (n.d.e). Shíguó chūnqiūn (in Chinese) – via Wikisource.
- Toqto'a (1343). Sòng Shǐ (in Chinese) – via Wikisource.
- Wenying (1078). Yù Hú Qīng Huà (in Chinese) – via Wikisource.
- Xue, Juzheng (974). Jiù Wǔdài Shǐ (in Chinese) – via Wikisource.
- Zheng, Wenbao 鄭文寶 (978). Nán Táng Jìn Shì (in Chinese) – via Wikisource.

=== Books ===
- Brose, Benjamin (2015). Patrons and Patriarchs : Regional Rulers and Chan monks during the Five Dynasties and Ten Kingdoms. Studies in East Asian Buddhism. Vol. 25. Honolulu: University of Hawaii Press. ISBN 978-0-8248-5381-5.
- Clark, Hugh R. (2016). The Sinitic Encounter in Southeast China through the First Millennium CE. Honolulu: University of Hawaii Press. ISBN 978-0-8248-5160-6.
- Clark, Hugh R. (2009). "The Southern Kingdoms between the T'ang and the Sung, 907–979". In Twitchett, Denis; Smith, Paul J. (eds.). The Sung Dynasty and its Precursors, 907–1279, Part 1. The Cambridge History of China. Vol. 5. New York: Cambridge University Press. pp. 133–205. ISBN 978-0-521-81248-1.
- Fu, Chonglan; Cao, Wenming (2019). Introduction to the Urban History of China. China Connections. Translated by Zhang, Qinggang. London: Palgrave Macmillan. doi:10.1007/978-981-13-8207-9. ISBN 978-981-13-8206-2. S2CID 199886993.
- Hartill, David (2005). Cast Chinese coins. Trafford: Trafford Publishing. ISBN 978-1412054669.
- Hay, Jonathan (2012). "Tenth-Century Painting before Song Taizong's Reign: A Macrohistorical View". In Hung, Wu (ed.). Tenth-century China and Beyond: Art and Visual Culture in a Multi-centered Age. Chicago: The Center for the Art of East Asia, University of Chicago. pp. 285–318. ISBN 978-1588861153.
- Kurz, Johannes L. (2011a). China's Southern Tang Dynasty (937–976). Routledge. ISBN 9780415454964.
- Kurz, Johannes (2011b). "Han Xizai (902–970): An Eccentric Life in Exciting Times". In Lorge, Peter (ed.). Five Dynasties and Ten Kingdoms. Hong Kong: China University Press. pp. 79–98. ISBN 978-9629964184.
- Kurz, Johannes (1997). "The Yangzi in the Negotiations between the Southern Tang and Its Northern Neighbors (Mid-Tenth Century)". In Dabringhaus, Sabine; Ptak, Roderich; Teschke, Richard (eds.). China and Her Neighbours: Borders, Visions of the Other, Foreign Policy 10th to 19th Century. South China and maritime Asia. Vol. 6. Wiesbaden: Harrassowitz. ISBN 3447039426.
- Lorge, Peter (2013). "Fighting Against Empire: Resistance to the Later Zhou and Song Conquest of China". In Lorge, Peter A. (ed.). Debating War in Chinese History. Leiden and New York: Brill. pp. 107–140. ISBN 978-90-04-22372-1.
- Lorge, Peter A. (2005). War, Politics and Society in Early Modern China, 900–1795. London and New York: Routledge. ISBN 0-415-31690-1.
- Mote, F. W. (1999). Imperial China (900-1800). Harvard University Press. ISBN 0674012127.
- Standen, Naomi (2009). "The Five Dynasties". In Twitchett, Denis; Smith, Paul J. (eds.). The Sung Dynasty and its Precursors, 907–1279, Part 1. The Cambridge History of China. Vol. 5. New York: Cambridge University Press. pp. 38–132. ISBN 978-0-521-81248-1.
- Twitchett, Denis; Tietze, Klaus-Peter (1994). "The Liao". In Franke, Herbert; Twitchett, Denis (eds.). Alien regimes and border states, 907–1368. The Cambridge History of China. Vol. 6. New York: Cambridge University Press. pp. 43–153. ISBN 0-521-24331-9.
- Worthy, Edmund H. (1983). "Diplomacy for Survival: Domestic and Foreign Relations of Wu Yüeh, 907-978". In Rossabi, Morris (ed.). China among Equals: The Middle Kingdom and Its Neighbors, 10th–14th Centuries. Berkley and Los Angeles: University of California Press. pp. 17–46. ISBN 0520043839.
- Wu, John C. H. (1972). The Four Seasons of Tang Poetry. Charles E. Tuttle. ISBN 978-0804801973.

=== Articles ===
- Chan, Ming K. (1974). "The Historiography of the Tzu-Chih T'ung-Chien: A Survey". Monumenta Serica. 31: 1–38. doi:10.1080/02549948.1974.11731093. JSTOR 40726165.
- Cho-ying, Li (2018). "A Failed Peripheral Hegemonic State with a Limited Mandate of Heaven: Politico-Historical Reflections of a Survivor of the Southern Tang". Tsing Hua Journal of Chinese Studies. 48 (2): 243–285. doi:10.6503/THJCS.201806_48(2).0002 – via Airiti.
- Clark, Hugh (2017). "Why Does the Tang-Song Interregnum Matter? Part Two: The Social and Cultural Initiatives of the South". Journal of Song-Yuan Studies. 47: 1–31. doi:10.1353/sys.2017.0001. S2CID 165226638.
- Clark, Hugh (2016b). "Why does the Tang-Song Interregnum matter?: A focus on the economies of the south". Journal of Song-Yuan Studies. 46: 1–28. doi:10.1353/sys.2016.0002. S2CID 165844099.
- Davis, Richard (1983). "Historiography as Politics in Yang Wei-chen's 'Polemic on Legitimate Succession'". T'oung Pao. 69 (1/3): 33–72. doi:10.1163/156853283X00045. JSTOR 4528281 – via Brill.
- Hartwell, David (1988). "The Imperial Treasuries: Finance and Power in Song China". Society for Song, Yuan, and Conquest Dynasty Studies. 20 (20): 18–89. JSTOR 23497391.
- Horesh, Niv (2013). "'Cannot be Fed on when Starving': An Analysis of the Economic Thought Surrounding China's Earlier Use of Paper Money". Journal of the History of Economic Thought. 35 (3): 373–395. doi:10.1017/S1053837213000229. S2CID 155064802 – via Cambridge University.
- Kurz, Johannes (2016a). "On the Unification Plans of the Southern Tang Dynasty". Journal of Asian History. 50 (1): 23–45. doi:10.13173/jasiahist.50.1.0023. JSTOR 10.13173/jasiahist.50.1.0023.
- Kurz, Johannes (2016b). "Song Taizong, the 'Record of Jiangnan' ('Jiangnan lu'), and an Alternate Ending to the Tang". Journal of Song-Yuan Studies. 46: 29–55. doi:10.1353/sys.2016.0003. S2CID 165211485.
- Kurz, Johannes L. (2014). "On the Southern Tang Imperial Genealogy". Journal of the American Oriental Society. 134 (4): 601–620. doi:10.7817/jameroriesoci.134.4.601. JSTOR 10.7817/jameroriesoci.134.4.601.
- Kurz, Johannes (2012). "The Consolidation of Official Historiography during the Early Northern Song Dynasty". Journal of Asian History. 46 (1): 13–35. JSTOR 41933604.
- Kurz, Johannes (1998). "The Invention of a "Faction" in Song Historical Writings on the Southern Tang". Society for Song, Yuan, and Conquest Dynasty Studies. 28 (28): 1–35. JSTOR 23496061.
- Kurz, Johannes (1994). "Sources for the History of the Southern Tang (937-975)". Society for Song, Yuan, and Conquest Dynasty Studies. 24 (24): 217–235. JSTOR 23496127.
- Lamouroux, Christian (1995). "Crise politique et développement rizicole en Chine : la région du Jiang-Huai (VIIIe – Xe siècles)". Bulletin de l'École française d'Extrême-Orient (in French). 82: 145–184. doi:10.3406/befeo.1995.2883.
- Lee, De-nin D. (2004). "Fragments for Constructing a History of Southern Tang Painting". Society for Song, Yuan, and Conquest. 34 (34): 1–39. JSTOR 23496260.
- Li, Man (2016). "Where is 'Yingyou' : the 'Tea Route' between Khitan and Southern Tang and its ports of departure". National Maritime Research. 2. Shanghai: 31–46. ISBN 978-7-5325-8037-8 – via Academia.edu.
- Pak-sheung, Ng (2016). "A Regional Cultural Tradition in Song China: "The Four Treasures of the Study of the Southern Tang" ('Nan Tang wenfang sibao')". Journal of Song-Yuan Studies. 46: 57–117. doi:10.1353/sys.2016.0004. S2CID 165887772.
- Woolley, Nathan (2014). "From restoration to unification: legitimacy and loyalty in the writings of Xu Xuan (917–992)". Bulletin of the School of Oriental and African Studies. 77 (3): 547–567. doi:10.1017/S0041977X14000536 – via Cambridge University Press.

=== Theses ===
- Kim, Hanshin (2012). The Transformation in State and Elite Responses to Popular Religious Beliefs (PhD thesis). University of California, Los Angeles.
- Krompart, Robert J. (1973). The Southern Restoration of T'ang: Counsel, Policy, and Parahistory in the Stabilization of the Chiang-Huai Region, 887–943 (PhD thesis). University of California, Berkeley.
- Standen, Naomi (1994). Frontier crossings from north China to Liao, c.900-1005 (PhD thesis). Durham University.
- Woolley, Nathan (2010). Religion and Politics in the Writings of Xu Xuan (917-92) (PhD thesis). Australian National University.

=== Websites ===
- Ashkenazy, Gary (10 June 2015). "Vault Protector Coins". Primaltrek – a journey through Chinese culture.
- Ashkenazy, Gary (16 November 2016). "Chinese coins – 中國錢幣". Primaltrek – a journey through Chinese culture.
- Kao, Garry (21 August 2015). 收藏迷带你深度游钱币博物馆 (in Chinese (China)). 蝌蚪五线谱. Archived from the original on 12 August 2020.
- Kokotailo, Robert (2018). "Chinese Cast Coins – Southern T'ang Dynasty AD 937–978". Calgary Coin & Antique Gallery – Chinese Cast Coins.

== See also ==
- Five Dynasties and Ten Kingdoms period
- Suppression of the Southern Tang
