= Wenying =

Song dynasty historian

- Born: Late 10th century Likely Hang Prefecture
- Died: After 1078; Unknown
- Occupations: Buddhist monk, writer, lecturer, book collector
- Writing career
- Language: Classical Chinese
- Genre: Biji
- Subject: History
- Notable works: Xiangshan Yelu, Yuhu Qinghua

Chinese name
- Traditional Chinese: 文瑩
- Simplified Chinese: 文莹
- Literal meaning: Literary, Lustrous
Transcriptions
Standard Mandarin
- Hanyu Pinyin: Wényíng
- Wade–Giles: Wen^{2}-ying^{2}

Daowen
- Traditional Chinese: 道溫
- Simplified Chinese: 道温
Transcriptions
Standard Mandarin
- Hanyu Pinyin: Dàowēn
- Wade–Giles: Tao^{4}-wen^{1}

Wenying (fl. 11th century), courtesy name Daowen, was a Song dynasty Buddhist monk who authored the unofficial history books Xiangshan Yelu and Yuhu Qinghua.

== Biography ==
Wenying was a native of Qiantang (錢塘, modern Hangzhou), Hang Prefecture, Liangzhe Circuit of the Song Empire. He was a talented poet who studied under Ding Wei and received Ding's favors. He also befriended Su Shunqing who introduced him to Ouyang Xiu. He later lived in the Jinluan Monastery (金鑾寺) in Jing Prefecture in modern Hubei.

Wenying was fascinated by public affairs, and by the 1070s he had collected works by more than 200 writers since the dynasty began in 960. This collection, numbering thousands of chapters, included biographies, memorials to the throne, official historical records, obituaries inscribed on tombs, and religious texts from steles, as well as poems and private prose literature.

== Bibliography ==
- Xiangshan Yelu (湘山野錄), completed in the Xining era (1068–1077)
- Yuhu Qinghua (玉壺清話), completed in 1078

Both history books focus on saints, emperors, and ministers from the early Song dynasty, but Wenying also included anecdotes he heard and saw. Wenying expressed his views openly, including criticisms of court officials. Yuhu Qingshi also includes 2 chapters on the Southern Tang dynasty (937–976).
