= Song conquest of Southern Tang =

974–975 conflicts in China

Song–Southern Tang War
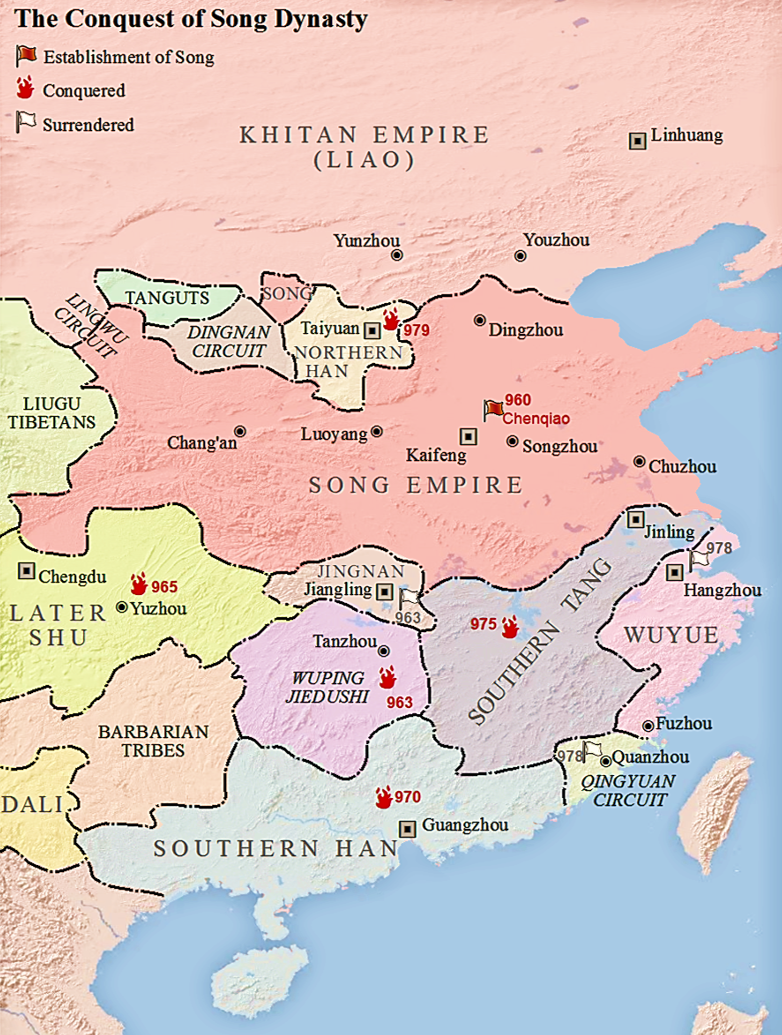
Date	974–975
Location	Southern Tang Empire
Result	Conquest of Southern Tang by Song

Belligerents
Song dynasty Wuyue	Southern Tang dynasty

Commanders and leaders
Cao Bin; Pan Mei; Wang Ming; Liu Yu	Li Yu; Du Zhen; Zheng Yanhua; Zhu Lingyun †

In 975 AD the Song managed through force to subdue the state now known as Southern Tang, to distinguish it from the synonymously named Tang dynasty, of which the Southern Tang proclaimed itself to be successor, as part of a series of Song conquests to reunify China.

== Battle on the Yangtze ==
On the river Yangtze near Nanking, the capital of the Southern Tang, a major naval battle took place in 975 between the Song empire and the Southern Tang.

== Forces ==
Southern Tang

The Tang had a fleet of ships that were ten decks high and equipped with multiple flamethrowers. There were at least 150,000 soldiers and sailors under the command of Zhu Lingyun.

Song

The admiral for the Song was Cao Bin. The Song ships were smaller, but the crew on board were better archers. The ships had flamethrowers and were filled with bundles of reed soaked in oil to be thrown at the enemy ships.

== Battle ==
The Song ships attacked ferociously, firing so many arrows that soon, the Tang ships were studded with them. Zhu Lingyun then ordered the flamethrowers to be fired. Normally, any attacker would be destroyed; however, the wind blew in the opposite direction of the flamethrowers so the burning oil flew back onto the Tang. At that moment, the Song started throwing the bundles of burning reeds into the wind to cause more damage. The Song may have started using their own flamethrowers at this stage. About 150,000 Tang soldiers and sailors were killed in the fire and Zhu Lingyun committed suicide by jumping into the flames.

== Analysis of battle ==
Considering the position of Nanking in China, where the imperial capital would have been, and the above "evidence", it can be assumed that there was a strong westerly wind on the day of that battle. The attackers would have had the advantage of having a good wind behind them, their ships would have travelled much faster, and their arrows, "burning bundles" and burning oil would have had extra propulsion. However, the defending side would have had the exact opposite to this. Considering the claimed size of the defenders ships, Zhu Lingyun would have probably been inside the ship and may have not been aware of what the weather was like, which would have led him to make the mistake of ordering the flamethrowers to be fired. On a technological note, we know that the Wujing Zongyao, written in 1044 (although the oldest edition is from around the 1560s), describes the flamethrowers oil being lit by fire drug (a flammable, quasi explosive compound that would in later cultures and generations be refined into gunpowder) and we know that fire drug was invented as a medicine sometime in the 9th century, but whether this battle did use gunpowder is speculative.

== Aftermath ==
Li Houzhu, the emperor of the Southern Tang, was more interested in poetry than ruling, and soon after this battle the Southern Tang were absorbed into the new Song Empire. He was captured and sent to the Song capital, one of his wives raped and he was eventually poisoned.

After the fall of Tang, Lu Jiang acting Military Governor of Zhaowu Circuit continued to resist Song army after seizing She Prefecture before persuaded to surrender; General Hu Ze at Jiang Prefecture also continued the resistance for four months more.

== See also ==
- Li Houzhu
- Nanking
- Song Empire
