= Jiangnan Bielu =

Song dynasty-era history book

Jiangnan Bielu (Chinese: 江南别錄; "Alternative Records of Jiangnan") was a historical text of the Southern Tang dynasty, one of the Ten Kingdoms in the history of China. It was written by the Northern Song scholar Chen Pengnian (陳彭年). The content of the book was later included in the Siku Quanshu.
