= Jiangbiao Zhi =

Jiangbiao Zhi (江表志; "Treatises on Beyond the River") was a book written by Zheng Wenbao in 1010 during imperial China's Song dynasty on the history of Southern Tang, a regime in the Five Dynasties and Ten Kingdoms period. Zheng had served Southern Tang, and after its conquest by Song in 976, served as grain transport manager in the northwestern region. Jiangbiao Zhi contains three chapters or scrolls.
