= Jiangnan Yeshi =

Jiangnan Yeshi (Chinese: 江南野史; lit. 'Unofficial History of Jiangnan') was a historical text on the Chinese Southern Tang dynasty written by the Long Gun (龍袞) during the Northern Song dynasty. Most likely of 20 chapters originally, only 10 are extant. Praised for its linguistic mastery, it was later included in the Siku Quanshu.
