= Song conquest of Later Shu =

964–965 war in China

Song conquest of the Later Shu
Date	December 8, 964 – February 11, 965
Location	Later Shu
Result	Northern Song victory; Surrender and annexation of the Later Shu

Belligerents
Northern Song dynasty	Later Shu dynasty

Commanders and leaders
Emperor Taizu of Song; Wang Quanbin; Cui Yanjin; Liu Guangyi; Wang Renshan; Cao Bin	Meng Chang (surrendered); Wang Zhaoyuan (POW); Han Baozheng (POW); Zhao Chongtao (surrendered); Li Jin (surrendered); Gao Yanchou †

The Song conquest of the Later Shu was a war between the Northern Song dynasty and its southwestern neighbor, the Later Shu dynasty from 964 to 965. Despite natural barriers, the Later Shu defense proved extremely incompetent, and the Later Shu emperor Meng Chang surrendered within 70 days of the Northern Song invasion.

== Notes and references ==
- (in Chinese) Li Tao (1183). Xu Zizhi Tongjian Changbian (續資治通鑑長編) [Extended Continuation to Zizhi Tongjian].
