= Cao Bin =

Military general in imperial China (931–999)

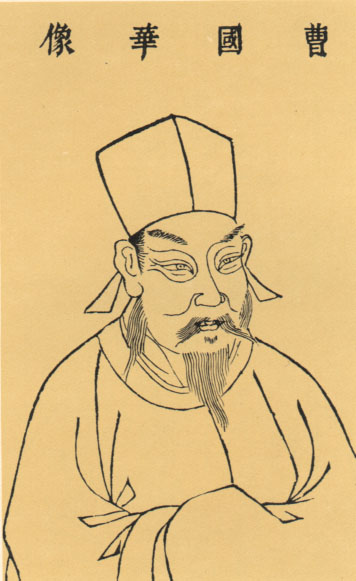
- an illustration from Sancai Tuhui (1609)

Personal details
- Born: 931 modern Lingshou County, Hebei
- Died: 999 (aged 67–68) modern Kaifeng, Henan
- Children: Cao Can (曹璨), son; Cao Xu (曹珝), son; Cao Wei (曹瑋), son; Cao Xuan (曹玹), son; Cao Ji (曹玘), son; Cao Xun (曹珣), son; Cao Cong (曹琮), son
- Father: Cao Yun (曹芸)
- Mother: Lady Zhang (張氏)
- Full name: Surname: Cáo (曹); Given name: Bīn (彬); Courtesy name: Guóhuá (國華); Posthumous name: Wǔhuì (武惠)

Cao Bin
- Chinese: 曹彬
Transcriptions
Standard Mandarin
- Hanyu Pinyin: Cáo Bīn
- Wade–Giles: Tsao^{2} Pin^{1}
Yue: Cantonese
- Yale Romanization: Chou^{4} Ban^{1}
- Jyutping: Cou^{4} Ban^{1}

Cao Bin (Chinese: 曹彬; 931–999) was a military general in imperial China. A nephew-in-law of Guo Wei, who founded the Later Zhou in 951, Cao first rose up through the ranks of the Later Zhou military. After the Song dynasty replaced Later Zhou in 960, Cao participated in the conquest of the Later Shu state in 965, where he distinguished himself from the other generals for disciplining his troops from pillaging the area, and was promoted as a result. In 974, he was named the overall commander to invade the Southern Tang state, which he successfully conquered in 976, again taking careful measures to prevent unnecessary killing. However, in one last campaign in 986 against the northern Liao dynasty, he suffered a crushing defeat at the hands of Yelü Xiuge.

== Early life ==
Cao Bin's father Cao Yun (曹芸) was a military commander of Chengde Commandery (成德軍; centered in modern Zhengding County, Hebei) under the Later Han. Before the age of 20, Cao Bin served under his father as a minor general, and Wu Xingde (武行德), the military governor of Chengde Commandery, was reportedly very impressed by him. At that time his maternal aunt Lady Zhang (張氏) was married to Guo Wei, another military governor. In 950, she was killed by Later Han emperor Liu Chengyou as Guo rebelled. Guo eventually overthrew Later Han to found the Later Zhou.

== Career under Later Zhou ==
He was known for instilling discipline in his army, and for his disregard for anything material. Once, a messenger refused to believe he was the general, saying "how could the emperor's relative dress in modest clothing and sleep on a commoner's bed?" In 958, he was sent to Wuyue Kingdom as a convoy and adamantly refused all bribes from Wuyue.

After Later Zhou was overthrown by the Song dynasty, Cao Bin was part of Song's conquest of Later Shu. After victories, some of the Song generals suggested massacre to show Song's power but Cao Bin prevented it. When the other generals robbed the territory of its wealth, Cao Bin was only interested in books and the traditional clothing. Returning to the capital, Cao Bin reported the other generals, and was named jiedushi.

In 974 Cao Bin commanded the army that conquered Southern Tang, and after a few other battles against Northern Han and Liao dynasty, he was given control over the entire Song dynasty's army.

His granddaughter was Empress Cao, married to Emperor Renzong of Song.

== Notes and references ==
=== Sources ===
- Shiba Yoshinobu (1976). "Ts'ao Pin". In Franke, Herbert (ed.). Sung Biographies. Wiesbaden: Franz Steiner Verlag. pp. 1060–1062. ISBN 3-515-02412-3.
- (in Chinese) Toqto'a; et al., eds. (1345). Song Shi (宋史) [History of Song].
