= Song conquest of Southern Han =

970–971 war in China

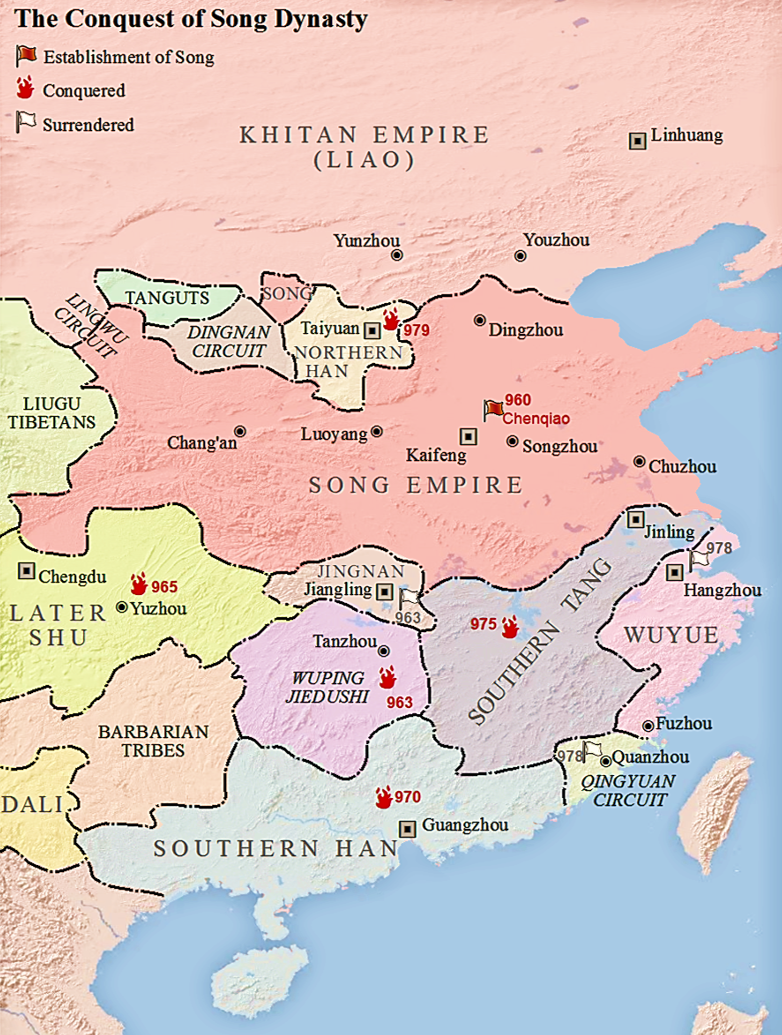
Date	970–971
Location	Present-day Guangdong province
Result	Surrender of Southern Han, annexation of Southern Han by the Song Dynasty

Belligerents
Northern Song dynasty	Southern Han dynasty

Commanders and leaders
Pan Mei	

The Conquest of Southern Han by Song (Chinese: 宋滅南漢之戰) occurred in 971, when Northern Song forces captured the Southern Han capital of Guangzhou in present-day Guangdong Province. The conquest marked the end of the Southern Han dynasty, a short-lived kingdom established during the Five Dynasties and Ten Kingdoms period in southern China. The Northern Song's victory was a significant step in the reunification of China, which had been fragmented for nearly a century. The conquest was led by Song general Pan Mei, who employed a combination of military force and diplomacy to achieve his goal. After a series of battles, the Southern Han forces were defeated and their emperor, Liu Chang, surrendered. The conquest of Southern Han was a decisive victory for the Northern Song, and it helped to solidify their position as the dominant power in China.
