= The Crown Prince Replaced by a Cat =

Ancient Chinese folk story

The Crown Prince Replaced by a Cat (simplified Chinese: 狸猫换太子; traditional Chinese: 狸貓換太子) is a famous Chinese story attested in the literary work The Seven Heroes and Five Gallants. It is related to the theme of the calumniated wife and classified in the international Aarne-Thompson-Uther Index as type ATU 707, "The Three Golden Children". These tales refer to stories where a girl promises a king she will bear a child or children with wonderful attributes, but her jealous relatives or the king's wives plot against the babies and their mother.

== Translations ==
The tale has been variously translated to English as The Prince replaced by a Cat, "Cat in Exchange for a Prince"; The Baby Prince who was replaced by a Cat, Palace Plot, Exchange a Leopard Cat for the Crown Prince, A Cat Replaces the Crown Prince; and Exchanging a Leopard Cat for a Prince.

== Summary ==
In this tale, Consort Li was an equal of Consort Liu when she gave birth to Emperor Renzong. Consort Liu plotted with eunuch Guo Huai to secretly swap the infant with a skinned Dragon Li cat. Outraged by the "monster baby" and believing her cursed, Emperor Zhenzong demoted Consort Li to the forbidden palace. Meanwhile, Consort Liu ordered her maid Kou Zhu to murder the infant and dump the body, but Kou Zhu gave the infant to eunuch Chen Lin, who hid him in a box and carried him to emperor's brother Eighth Prince, who took his infant nephew in as one of his sons. Later, Consort Liu persuaded Emperor Zhenzong to have Consort Li killed. Eunuch Yu Zhong volunteered to die in her place, and with the help of another eunuch Qin Feng, Consort Li finally escaped from the palace. Several years later, as an old blind woman in a poor village, she found the opportunity to tell the story to the good official Bao Zheng. Finally the hidden secret was unearthed and the crown prince, now Emperor Renzong, eventually accepted his birth mother.

== Analysis ==
=== Tale type ===
According to Wilt Idema, Chinese scholars classify the tale as type ATU 707, "The Three Golden Children", of the international Aarne-Thompson-Uther Index.

According to Sinologists Idema and Boris L. Riftin, the tale is very popular in China, both as a folkloric account and a literary work. Riftin suggested that the tale was first written down between the 12th and 14th centuries.

=== Motifs ===
Chinese folklorist and scholar Ting Nai-tung established a second typological classification of Chinese folktales (the first was by Wolfram Eberhard in the 1930s). In his new system, tale type 707, "The Three Golden Sons", shows the rivalry between the king's other wives; the number of children vary between stories, and the animal that replaces the children "is often a dead cat".

== Variants ==
=== Chinese-Americans ===
In a tale collected from a Chinese-American source from California, titled The Long Lost Mother, a king is childless, but his queen promises him a boy. When his son is born, a guard who hates the royal couple replaces the boy for a slain cat. The queen is accused of infidelity and banished from the palace. She ends up in poverty and finds a lonely child in a small house. She decides to adopt the baby as her son. Despite its origin as literary tale, Chinese scholar Ting Nai-Tung acknowledged that its oral variants "clearly belong[ed]" to tale type ATU 707.

=== Dungan people ===
Riftin published a similar tale from the Dungan people with the title "Limo huan tei" (狸猫換胎), translated into Russian as "Подмена новорожденного кошкой" ("Replacing a newborn with a cat"), first collected from a Dungan source in 1962. In this tale, an emperor and his wife, the empress, have no children, until some time later she feels she is ready to give birth to the imperial heir. While the emperor is away, she gives birth to the prince, but evil courtiers plot against her: they place a skinned cat in the baby's cradle and cast the boy in the water in a box. when the emperor returns, he sees the animal instead of a human child, and exiles the empress from the palace, while the baby prince is rescued and raised by a fisherman. Later, regretting his actions, he sends a friend to search for the empress, who has been banished to a desert island. The man recognizes her as his sister and brings her home with him. Back to the emperor, he decides to remarry, but, remembering the former empress, decides to postpone the wedding and goes to his friend's house. Once there, he finds the friend's sister, who he does not recognize as his former wife, and marries her. The emperor's new wife, who is the formerly disgraced empress, reveals the whole truth to him. The emperor, then, punishes the evil courtiers and takes his son and adoptive parents to his court. According to Riftin, the tale refers to the period of the reign of emperor Dzhen-tszuna (Ren-zong) (1022-1063).

=== Lahu people ===
In a tale from the Lahu people with the title The King's Three Children who had to Suffer, a king has seven wives and declares he will make his major wife the one that gives birth to a male heir. The king's seventh queen becomes pregnant, and the other six queens, feeling threatened, take the boy as soon as he is born and cast him in the river in a raft. The same destiny befalls the seventh queen's next children (a boy and a girl). The three children are saved and raised by a poor childless couple. Years later, after their adoptive parents die, the boys grow up as fine hunters, while their sister stays at home. One day, a person comes to their house and says they lack the eternal water (Lahu: ika ti), the tree of life (Lahu: napfuh law ceh) and a talking bird (Lahu: taw yaw pui ve nga eh).

== See also ==
- The Pretty Little Calf
