= Zhao Defang =

Chinese prince (959–981)

- Died: 18 April 981
- Spouse: Lady Jiao (焦氏); Lady Fu (符氏); Lady Wang (王氏); Lady Li (李氏)
- Issue: Zhao Weixu (趙惟敘), son; Zhao Weixian (趙惟憲), son; Zhao Weineng (趙惟能), son; Princess Yongshou (m. Cui Congshi (崔从湜)
Names
- Family name: Zhào (趙); Given name: Défāng (德芳)
Posthumous name
- Prince of Chǔ (楚王); Prince Kānghuì of Qín (秦康惠王)
- House: Zhao
- Father: Emperor Taizu of Song
- Mother: Lady Wang, Empress Xiaoming

Zhao Defang (Chinese: 趙德芳; c. 959–981) was an imperial prince of imperial China's Song dynasty. He was the fourth son of Emperor Taizu and the younger brother of Zhao Dezhao.

He was the 3rd great-grandfather of Emperor Xiaozong of Song.

== Biography ==
In 976, Zhao Defang had his first official appointment as the Defense Commissioner of Guizhou, which was quickly followed by appointments of Prefect of Xingyuan (興元, today's Hanzhong), Military Commissioner of Shannanxi Circuit (山南西道, around today's Sichuan) and chancellor. In the winter of 978 he was named Grand Commandant of Inspection (檢校太尉). He died in 981 from an unnamed illness at the young age of 23. Emperor Taizong, his uncle, visited his coffin in tears and cancelled imperial court meetings for 5 days to commemorate him.

== Family ==
=== Parents ===
- Zhao Kuangyin, Taizu (太祖 趙匡胤; 21 March 927 – 14 November 976)
- Empress Xiaohui, of the He clan (孝惠皇后 賀氏; 929–958)

=== Consorts and issue ===
- Princess Consort of Qin, of the Jiao clan (楚王妃 焦氏), daughter of Jiao Jixun (焦继勋)
  - Zhao Weixu, Prince of Gaoping (高平郡王 趙惟敘; 977–1011), first son
  - Zhao Weixian, Duke of Ying (英国公 趙惟憲; 979–1016), second son
- Lady Weiguo, of the Fu clan (卫国夫人 符氏), granddaughter of Fu Yanqing (符彥卿)
  - Zhao Weining, Duke of Nankang (南康郡公 趙惟能; 979 – 1008), third son
- Lady of Qinguo, of the Wang clan (秦国夫人 王氏)
- Lady of Yingchuan, of the Li clan (颖川夫人 李氏)
- Unknown:
  - Princess Yongshou (永寿县主)
    - married Cui Congshi (崔从湜)

== In fiction ==
In popular stories, including the Generals of the Yang Family legends and Seven Heroes and Five Gallants, Zhao Defang is known as the "Eighth Prince" (八王爺) or "Eighth Virtuous Prince" (八賢王), but this character seems to be a "merger" between Zhao Defang and Zhao Defang's cousin Zhao Yuanyan.

The breakdown:

Zhao Defang (fictional)	Zhao Defang (historical)	Zhao Yuanyan (historical)
Emperor Taizu's son Emperor Taizong's nephew Emperor Zhenzong's cousin	Emperor Taizu's son Emperor Taizong's nephew Emperor Zhenzong's cousin	Emperor Taizu's nephew Emperor Taizong's son Emperor Zhenzong's brother
nicknamed "Eighth Virtous Prince"	Emperor Taizu's 4th son no reputation	Emperor Taizong's 8th son known for his virtues
already an adult during Emperor Taizong's reign (976–997)	born in 959	born in 985
served during Emperor Zhenzong's reign (997–1022) served and died during Emperor Renzong's reign (1022–1063)	died in 981	died in 1044

The "Eighth Virtuous Prince" in Seven Heroes and Five Gallants was clearly based on the historical Zhao Yuanyan, who

- was the only paternal uncle during Emperor Renzong's reign
- had conflicts with Empress Dowager Liu
- eventually revealed the secret about the Emperor Renzong's real birth mother (see Consort Li)

== Sources ==
- Toqto'a; et al. (1346). Song Shi (宋史) [History of Song] (in Chinese).
