= Empress Li (Song dynasty) =

Empress Mingde 明德皇后

Empress consort of the Song dynasty
- Tenure: 30 December 984 – 8 May 997
- Predecessor: Empress Xiaozhang
- Successor: Empress Zhangmu

Empress Dowager of the Song Dynasty
- Tenure: 12 May 997 – 7 April 1004
- Successor: Empress Zhangxian
- Born: 960; Changzhi, Shanxi
- Died: 7 April 1004; Kaifeng, Henan
- Burial: Gongyi, Henan
- Spouse: Emperor Taizong
Names
- Family name: Lǐ (李)
Posthumous name
- Empress Míngdé (明德皇后)
- Father: Li Chuyun (李處耘)
- Mother: Lady Chen (陳氏)

Empress Li (960 – 7 April 1004) was an empress consort of ancient China's Northern Song dynasty, married to Emperor Taizong. After his death, she was the empress dowager for her stepson Emperor Zhenzong.

== Biography ==
The second daughter of Song general Li Chuyun, it was arranged that she marry Zhao Guangyi by Zhao Guangyi's elder brother Emperor Taizu of Song. After Emperor Taizu's death in 976, Zhao Guangyi became Emperor Taizong, and Lady Li officially became his imperial consort in 978. She was named empress on 10 January 985.

== Titles ==
- During the reign of Emperor Taizu of Song (4 February 960– 14 November 976):
  - Lady Li (李氏; from 960
  - Princess Consort (王妃; from 976)
- During the reign of Emperor Taizong of Song (15 November 976 – 8 May 997)
  - Empress (皇后; from 984)
- During the reign of Emperor Zhenzong of Song (8 May 997 – 23 March 1022 )
  - Empress Dowager (皇太后: from 997)
  - Empress Mingde (孝德皇后; posthumous title awarded 22 April 1004)

== Issue ==
As empress:

- Zhao Yuanyi, Prince Chong (崇王 趙元億), Taizong's ninth son

== Notes and references ==
=== Sources ===
- (in Chinese) Toqto'a; et al. (1346). Song Shi (宋史) [History of Song].

Chinese royalty
Preceded by Empress Song	Empress of China; 984–997	Succeeded by Empress Guo (Zhenzong)
