= Empress Guo (Zhenzong) =

Empress Zhangmu 章穆皇后

Empress consort of the Song dynasty
- Tenure: 9 June 997 – 5 May 1007
- Predecessor: Empress Mingde
- Successor: Empress Liu

Lady of Lu State 鲁国夫人;
- Tenure: 17 September 993 – 16 April 996

Lady of Qin State 秦国夫人
- Tenure: 16 April 996 – 9 May 997
- Born: 975; Bing Province ( present-day Shanxi), China
- Died: 5 May 1007; Kaifeng, Henan
- Burial: Gongyi, Henan
- Spouse: Emperor Zhenzong of Song
- Issue: Crown Prince Daoxian and 2 unnamed sons
Names
- Family name: Guo (郭氏)
Posthumous name
- Empress Zhangmu (章穆皇后)
- Father: Guo Shouwen (郭守文)
- Mother: Lady Liang (梁氏)

Empress Guo (c. 975 – 5 May 1007) was a Chinese empress consort of the Song Dynasty, married to Emperor Zhenzong of Song.

She became the primary consort of Zhezong in 991, in a marriage arranged by his father the emperor. The marriage produced a son, which died in childhood. She became his empress consort when he succeeded to the throne in 997.

== Titles ==
- During the reign of Emperor Taizu of Song (4 February 960– 14 November 976):
  - Lady Guo (郭氏; from 975)
- During the reign of Emperor Taizong of Song (15 November 976 – 8 May 997)
  - Lady of Lu State (鲁国夫人; from 991)
  - Lady of Qin State (秦国夫人; from 996)
- During the reign of Emperor Zhenzong (8 May 997 – 23 March 1022 )
  - Empress (皇后; from May 997)
  - Empress Zhuangmu (庄穆皇后; 3 June 1007 to 12 December 1044)
- During the reign of Emperor Renzong of Song
  - Empress Zhangmu (章穆皇后; from 13 December 1044)

== Issue ==
As Lady of Lu State:

- Zhao You, Crown Prince Daoxian (悼獻皇太子 趙佑; 995–1003), second son of Emperor Zhenzong

As Empress:

- Unnamed son
- Unnamed son

Chinese royalty
Preceded by Empress Li (Taizong)	Empress of China; 997–1007	Succeeded by Empress Liu (Zhenzong)
