= Consort Wang (Taizong) =

- Spouse: Emperor Taizong of Song
- Children: Zhao Yuanyan

Consort Wang (Chinese: 王德妃, pinyin: Wáng) was a consort of the Song dynasty's second emperor, Emperor Taizong of Song.

== Biography ==
The Emperor gave her the title of shufei. The Emperor and Wang had a son, Zhao Yuanyan, called the “Eighth Prince” (born 986). At the time of the prince's birth, the Emperor's wife was Empress Li, considered the “official mother” of the Prince. The Emperor and his other consort, Lady Li, had a son Zhao Heng, who succeeded his father in 997 as Emperor Zhenzong.

When Wang became ill, she was served by her son personally, who thus showed filial piety.

== Ranks ==
Lady Wang was first titled the Lady of Jincheng County (金城郡君) by Emperor Taizong. After she gave birth to the Eighth Prince she was promoted to the title of Beauty Meiren (美人). Eventually she became Jieyu (婕妤). Consort Wang rose up the ranks and became Zhaoyuan (昭媛), the 12th rank concubine. After she died, she was titled the Virtuous Consort defei (德妃) and months later shufei (淑妃).
