= Zhao Lingzhi =

Song dynasty scholar

Zhao Lingzhi (simplified Chinese: 赵令畤; traditional Chinese: 趙令畤; 1064–1134), courtesy name Zhao Jingkuang 趙景貺 or Zhao Delin 趙德麟, style Liaofuweng 聊複翁 or Cangliu jushi 藏六居士, was a Chinese poet and politician of the Northern Song dynasty. Zhao Lingzhi was a descendant of Zhao Dezhao 趙德昭, the Prince of Yan (燕懿王), and second son of Emperor Taizu (r. 960-975), the founder of the Song dynasty. He was one of Su Shi's close friends.

He is known for his Houqing lu (侯鯖錄/侯鲭录), a biji ("brush notes" style book) in 8 juan. The Hanyu da zidian, for example, makes use of it in the edition of the Zhibuzuzhai congshu 知不足斋丛书.

== Works ==
- Liaofu ji 聊复集, 1 juan
- Houqing lu 侯鲭录, 8 juan
