= Empress Song (Song dynasty) =

Chinese empress consort (952–995)

Empress Xiaozhang 孝章皇后

Empress consort of the Song dynasty
- Tenure: 968–976
- Predecessor: Empress Xiaoming
- Successor: Empress Mingde
- Born: 952; Luoyang, Henan, China
- Died: 995 (aged 42–43); Kaifeng, Henan, China
- Burial: Gongyi, Henan, China
- Spouse: Emperor Taizu
Names
- Family name: Sòng (宋); Given name: unknown
Posthumous name
- Empress Xiàozhāng (孝章皇后)
- Father: Song Yanwo (宋延偓)
- Mother: Princess Yongning (永甯公主) of the Later Han, surnamed Liu

Empress Song (952–995 CE) was a Chinese empress consort of the Song dynasty, married to Emperor Taizu of Song.

She came from a royal family. Her maternal grandfather was Later Han's first emperor Liu Zhiyuan. Her paternal grandmother was a daughter of Later Tang's first emperor Li Cunxu.

After her husband' s death, it was unclear who should be the next emperor, as Emperor Taizu had not made clear plans for the succession, nor had he trained his potential successors. According to chronicles of the time, Empress Song ordered the eunuch Wang Ji'en to fetch Taizu's younger son Zhao Defang, but Wang instead brought Taizu's brother Zhao Guangyi, the Prince of Jin, who had been manoeuvring to take the throne.

Upon seeing Zhao Guangyi, she acquiesced to his enthronement, possibly afraid that he might harm her and her son if she refused. Empress Song was never named as dowager (皇太后) since she was the new emperor's sister-in-law.

== Titles ==
- Empress (皇后; from 968)
- Empress Xiaozhang (孝章皇后; posthumously)

== Notes ==
Chinese royalty
Preceded by Empress Wang	Empress of China; 968–976	Succeeded by Empress Li (Taizong)
