= Ecorchement =

Ecorchement may refer to:

French

- skinning
- flaying

Other

- A paraphilia defined as sexual arousal by flagellation
