= Zhao Yuanyan =

Chinese prince (986–1044)

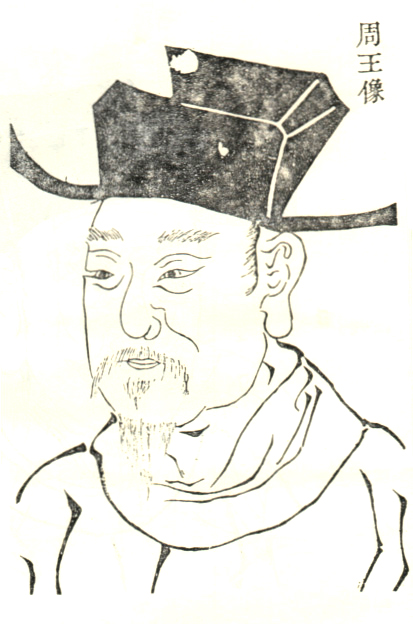
- portrait from Zhao family genealogy (1919)
- Born: c. 986
- Died: 13 February 1044 (aged 58)
- Spouse: Consort Zhang, Lady of Wei
Posthumous name
- Gongsu 恭肅
- Father: Emperor Taizong of Song
- Mother: Consort Wang

Zhao Yuanyan (simplified Chinese: 赵元俨; traditional Chinese: 趙元儼; pinyin: Zhào Yuányǎn), officially the Prince Gongsu of Zhou (周恭肅王) (c. 986 – 13 February 1044), was an imperial prince of the Chinese Song dynasty, known for his virtues. He was the 8th son of Emperor Taizong and a younger brother of Emperor Zhenzong. He was referred to as the "Eighth Prince" (八大王). He was the only surviving paternal uncle of Emperor Renzong during the latter's reign.

== Biography ==
As a child Zhao Yuanyan was known for his intelligence. He was a favorite of Emperor Taizong and often accompanied guests at his father's banquets. Zhao Yuanyan was also known for his filial piety as he would personally serve his mother, Consort Wang, every day when she became sick. Unlike others in the royal family, Zhao Yuanyan enjoyed books and literature. He also practiced calligraphy after the masters Wang Xianzhi and Wang Xizhi.

When his young nephew Emperor Renzong succeeded the throne, Empress Liu acted as the real regent. In order to avoid conflicts with the empress dowager, Zhao Yuanyan stayed at home, feigning lunacy. Only after Empress Liu's death did he return to the imperial court, where he also revealed the secret that Consort Li, and not Empress Liu, was the emperor's real mother.

Known for his stern demeanor, he became a trusted adviser of Emperor Renzong. When he became gravely ill, the emperor offered 5000 taels of silver but he refused, saying: "How can a man on death bed burden the country?" After his death, Emperor Renzong conducted memorials for him three times and distributed his writings and poems to different officials.

== Family ==
- Father: Emperor Taizong of Song
- Mother: Virtuous Consort, of the Wang clan (德妃 王氏)
- Consorts and their respective issue(s):
  - Princess Consort, of the Zhang clan (王妃 张氏)), daughter of Zhang Yongde (张永德)
    - Zhao Yunchu, Prince Gong'an of Boping (博平安恭王 赵允初, 1032 – 1064), fourth son
  - Furen, of the Liu clan (夫人 刘氏)
    - Zhao Yunliang (赵允良, 1013 – 1066), Prince of Ding (定王), second son
  - Unknown
    - Zhao Yunxi (赵允熙), Marquess of Boping (博平侯), first son
    - Zhao Yundi (赵允迪, 1014－1048), Prince Sike of Yongjia (永嘉思恪王), third son
    - Princess Zhao (趙氏), first daughter
      - married Liu Congguang (刘从广), second son of Liu Mei (刘美)
    - Princess Zhao (趙氏), second daughter
      - married Cui Shangxian (崔上贤)

== In fiction ==
The "Eighth Prince" (八王家) or "Eighth Virtuous Prince" (八賢王) is an important character in folk stories about the generals of the Yang clan, the generals of the Huyan clan, Di Qing and Bao Zheng. Many works present his name as Zhao Defang (趙德芳), who in history is Zhao Yuanyan's cousin, and Emperor Taizu's 4th son, and died at the age of 22 in 981 during Emperor Taizong's reign, long before many of the stories' historical characters (including Zhao Yuanyan himself) were born.

In fiction, the Eighth Prince married Di Qianjin (狄千金), the aunt of Di Qing, and raised Emperor Renzong as his adoptive parents since infancy, as the baby was almost killed in a conspiracy orchestrated by Consort Liu. The fiction also said that the Eighth Prince lived in the Southern Palace (南清宮) and had one son, Prince Luhua (潞花王).
