= Empress Xiaohui =

Empress Xiaohui may refer to:

- Empress Zhang Yan, formally Xiaohui, Han dynasty empress
- Empress Xiaohui (Song dynasty), first wife of Zhao Kuangyin
- Empress Xiaohui (Ming dynasty), consort of the Chenghua Emperor
- Empress Xiaohuizhang, second Empress Consort of the Shunzhi Emperor of the Qing Dynasty
