= Empress Wang (Taizu) =

Empress Xiaoming 孝明皇后

Empress consort of the Song dynasty
- Tenure: 960–963
- Successor: Empress Xiaozhang
- Born: 942; Bin County, Shaanxi, China
- Died: 963 (aged 20–21); Kaifeng, Henan, China
- Burial: Gongyi, Henan, China
- Spouse: Emperor Taizu
Names
- Surname: Wáng (王); Given name: unknown
Posthumous name
- Empress Xiàomíng (孝明皇后)
- Father: Wang Rao (王饒)

Empress Wang (王皇后, given name unknown) (942–963) was a Chinese empress consort of the Song dynasty, married to Emperor Taizu of Song.

== Titles ==
- During the reign of Emperor Gaozu of Later Jin (28 November 936 – 28 July 942):
  - Lady Wang (王氏; from 942)
- During the reign of Emperor Shizong of Later Zhou (26 February 954 – 27 July 959):
  - Second Wife (為繼室; from 958)
  - Lady of Langxie State (琅邪郡夫人; form unknown dare)
- During the reign of Emperor Taizu of Song (4 February 960– 14 November 976):
  - Empress (皇后; 4 February 960)
  - Empress Xiàomíng (孝明皇后; from 964)

== Issue ==
As Second Wife:

1. Zhao Defang, Prince Qinkanghui (秦康惠王 趙德芳; 959 – 981)
2. Unnamed daughter
3. Unnamed daughter

== Notes and references ==
=== Sources ===
- (in Chinese) Toqto'a; et al., eds. (1345). Song Shi (宋史) [History of Song].

Chinese royalty
Preceded by Five Dynasties and Ten Kingdoms period Preceding Empress of united China: Empress He (Tang dynasty)	Empress of China; 960–963	Succeeded by Empress Song
