= Consort Yang (Zhenzong) =

Empress Dowager of Song dynasty (984–1036)

Empress Zhanghui

Empress Dowager of the Song dynasty
- Tenure: 1033–1036
- Born: 984
- Died: 1036 (aged 51–52)
- Spouse: Emperor Zhenzong of Song
- Father: Yang Zhiyang (楊知儼)

Consort Yang (984–1036), was an imperial consort of Emperor Zhenzong and the de facto foster mother of Emperor Renzong. She was given the title of empress dowager in her later years.

After becoming a concubine, Lady Yang was well liked by the emperor.

When the heir to the throne, the future Emperor Renzong, was born to Consort Li in 1010, Lady Yang supported Empress Liu's claim to be his mother, while Lady Yang was given the actual responsibility for his upbringing. She was described as submissive and loyal to Empress Liu, and gentle and tender towards her fosterling Renzong.

Upon Emperor Zhenzong's death in 1022, Lady Yang was promoted to the rank of dowager consort in his will. Empress Liu took the role of regent during Renzong's minority, but kept it until her own death in 1033, even after he had reached legal majority. Upon her death, Empress Liu proclaimed Dowager Consort Yang as empress dowager and declared that she was now to be regent for the emperor. Though Emperor Renzong refused to accept this arrangement he did give her the rank of empress dowager, but without political power.

== Titles ==
- During the reign of Emperor Taizong (15 November 976 – 8 May 997):
  - Lady Yang (楊氏) (from 984)
  - Concubine (妾) (from 996)
- During the reign of Emperor Zhenzong (8 May 997 – 23 March 1022):
  - Talented Lady (才人; cái rén) (from May 1004)
  - Lady of Handsome Fairness (婕妤; jié yú) (from unknown date)
  - Lady of Graceful Ceremony (婉儀; wǎn yí) (from unknown date)
  - Pure Consort (淑妃; shū fēi) (from unknown date)
- During the reign of Emperor Renzong (24 March 1022 – 30 April 1063):
  - Dowager Consort (太妃; tài fēi) (after 1022)
  - Empress Dowager Baoqing (保慶皇太后) (after 1033)
  - Empress Zhanghui (章惠皇后) (from 1036)
