= Heluo, Henan =

Heluo 河洛镇
- Town
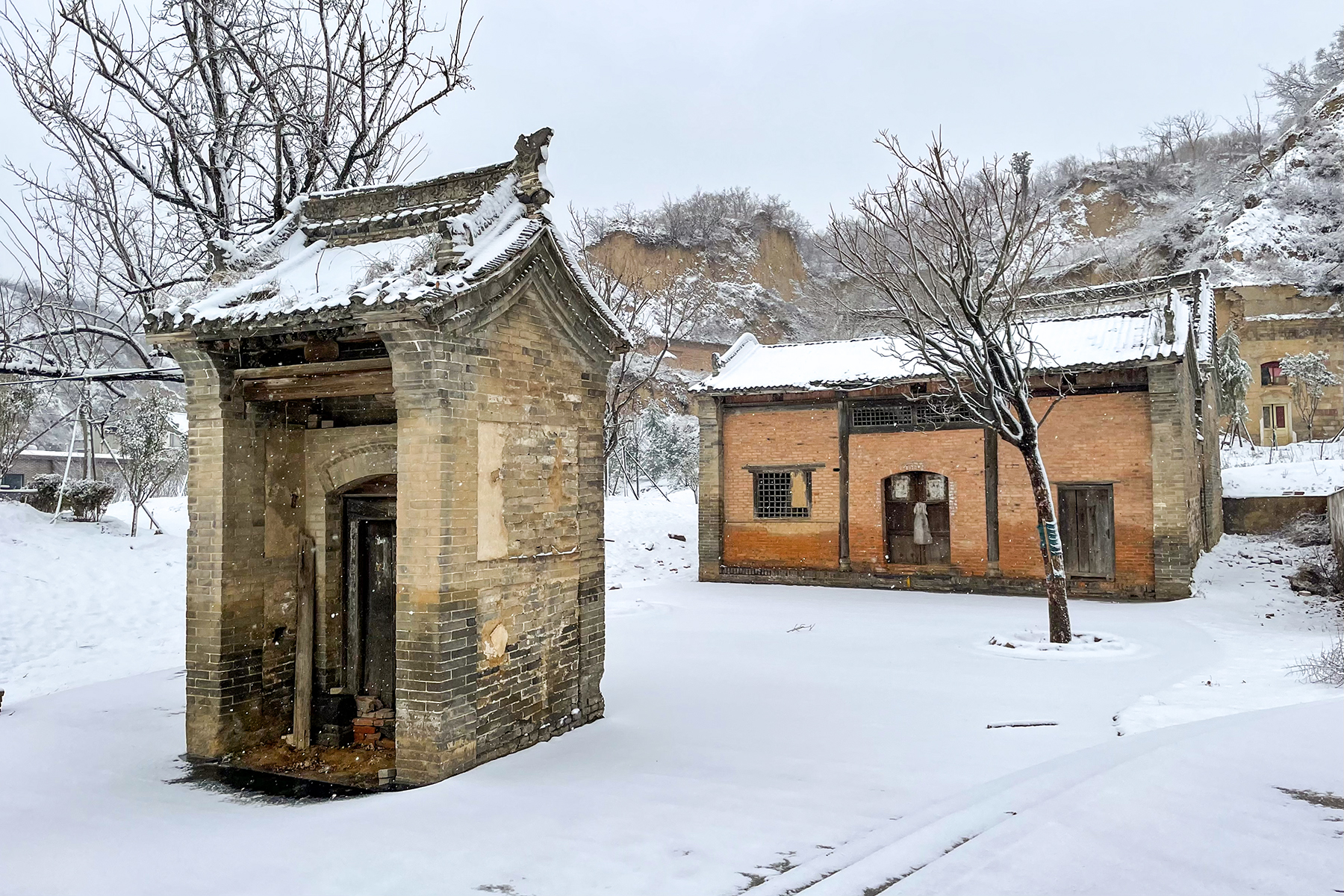
- Historical residential buildings in Qilipu Village

- Location in Henan
- Coordinates: 34°49′9″N 113°7′6″E
- Country: People's Republic of China
- Province: Henan
- Prefecture-level city: Zhengzhou
- County-level city: Gongyi
- Time zone: UTC+8 (China Standard)

Heluo (Chinese: 河洛; pinyin: Héluò) is a town under the administration of Gongyi, Henan, China. As of 2023, it administers the following 25 villages:

- Qilipu Village (七里铺村)
- Shuanghuaishu Village (双槐树村)
- Tanxiaoguan Village (滩小关村)
- Rencungou Village (仁存沟村)
- Shayugou Village (沙鱼沟村)
- Luokou Village (洛口村)
- Jinkou Village (金口村)
- Yuan Village (源村)
- Yingyu Village (英峪村)
- Guandian Village (官殿村)
- Xishigou Village (西石沟村)
- Baigouling Village (柏沟岭村)
- Rongnao Village (荣脑村)
- Shenbei Village (神北村)
- Shennan Village (神南村)
- Nanhedu Village (南河渡村)
- Siwan Village (寺湾村)
- Kanggou Village (康沟村)
- Shiguan Village (石关村)
- Miaomen Village (庙门村)
- Wulong Village (五龙村)
- Guqiao Village (古桥村)
- Caigou Village (蔡沟村)
- Shuiyu Village (水峪村)
- Shibangou Village (石板沟村)
