= Consort Li (Zhenzong) =

Song Dynasty consort (987–1032)

- An illustration from an 1814 print of the novel Sequel to Great Song's Generals of the Yang Family: The First Tale of the Literary and Martial Stars Lord Bao and Di Qing (後續大宋楊家將文武曲星包公狄青初傳)
- Born: 987; Hangzhou, Song Empire (modern Hangzhou, Zhejiang, China)
- Died: 1032 (aged 44–45); Kaifeng, Song Empire (modern Kaifeng, Henan, China)
- Burial: Yongding Mausoleum (永定陵)
- Spouse: Emperor Zhenzong of Song
- Issue: Emperor Renzong of Song, son; daughter
Posthumous name
- Empress Dowager Zhuāngyì (壯懿皇太后); Empress Dowager Zhāngyì (章懿皇太后)
- Father: Li Rende (李仁德)

Consort Li, imperial consort rank Chenfei (Chinese: 李宸妃; lit. 'Consort Li of the Palace') (987 – 1032), was an imperial consort of the Song dynasty of China. She was a concubine of Emperor Zhenzong and the mother of Emperor Renzong. She was posthumously honored as Empress Dowager Zhangyi (章懿皇太后), after Emperor Renzong discovered that she was his real mother.

== Biography ==
Born in Hangzhou, the future Consort Li first became an imperial maid for Consort Liu. She caught the eye of Emperor Zhenzong and bore him a boy and a daughter (who died). The boy was claimed by Consort Liu who successfully became the empress. Even after the boy became Emperor Renzong, the real mother still kept her silence. In the 11th year of her son's reign (also overseen by Empress Liu), she became ill and was given the consort rank Chenfei shortly before she died.

A year later, after Empress Liu also died, Prince Zhao Yuanyan told the emperor the truth, and also suggested that Consort Li had been murdered. Shocked with grief, Emperor Renzong visited the coffin with tears, ordered the construction of Jingling Palace for her memorial and gave her the posthumous title Empress Zhangyi. However, as Empress Liu had treated Consort Li's corpse with great respect, Emperor Renzong refused to believe that she would murder his biological mother.

== Legend ==
A Yuan Dynasty play (in the form of zaju) called Chen Lin Carrying the Box at Gold Water Bridge (金水橋陳琳抱妝盒) told the story of how Consort Li and her baby son were victimized by a jealous Consort Liu. This story, which probably borrowed elements from the play The Orphan of Zhao that is more historically plausible, became incredibly popular and saw many different versions in later periods, including the Qing Dynasty novel The Seven Heroes and Five Gallants, where it is referred to as The Wild Cat for Crown Prince.

In this later version, Consort Li was an equal of Consort Liu when she gave birth to Emperor Renzong. Consort Liu plotted with eunuch Guo Huai to secretly swap the infant with a skinned Chinese wild cat. Outraged by the "monster baby" and believing her cursed, Emperor Zhenzong demoted Consort Li to the forbidden palace. Meanwhile, Consort Liu ordered her maid Kou Zhu to murder the infant and dump the body, but Kou Zhu gave the infant to eunuch Chen Lin, who hid him in a box and carried him to emperor's brother Eighth Prince, who took his infant nephew in as one of his sons. Later, Consort Liu persuaded Emperor Zhenzong to have Consort Li killed. Eunuch Yu Zhong volunteered to die in her place, and with the help of another eunuch Qin Feng, Consort Li finally escaped from the palace. Several years later, as an old blind woman in a poor village, she found the opportunity to tell the story to the good official Bao Zheng. Finally the hidden secret was unearthed and the crown prince, now Emperor Renzong, eventually accepted his birth mother.

== Title ==
- During the reign of Emperor Taizong of Song (15 November 976 – 8 May 997):
  - Lady Li (李氏; from 987)
- During the reign of Emperor Zhenzong of Song (8 May 997 – 23 March 1022)
  - Servant (人的侍)
  - Lady of Chongyang County (崇阳县君; after 1010)
  - Talented Lady (才人;from February 1016)
  - Handsome Fairness (婉儀)
  - Lady of Conducive Appearance (順容)
  - Imperial Consort (宸妃)
  - Empress Zhangyi (章懿皇后)

== Issue ==
As a servant:

- Zhao Zhen, Renzong (仁宗 趙禎; 1010–1063), The emperor's sixth son

As a Talented Lady:

- Princess Jingyi (靜一帝姬), The emperor's first daughter
