= Liu Mei =

Chinese general (962–1021)

- Traditional Chinese: 劉美
- Simplified Chinese: 刘美
Transcriptions
Standard Mandarin
- Hanyu Pinyin: Liú Měi

Gong Mei
- Traditional Chinese: 龔美
- Simplified Chinese: 龚美
Transcriptions
Standard Mandarin
- Hanyu Pinyin: Gōng Měi

Liu Shiji
- Traditional Chinese: 劉世濟
- Simplified Chinese: 刘世济
Transcriptions
Standard Mandarin
- Hanyu Pinyin: Liú Shìjì

Liu Mei (c. 962 – c. 1021, courtesy name Shiji), born Gong Mei, was a Song dynasty official and general. Originally a silversmith, he rose to power after his protégé (possibly even wife) Lady Liu, whom he sold in poverty, became an empress. Because Empress Liu had no non-marital relatives, she claimed him as her brother. Liu Mei rose as high as Inspector in Chief of the Metropolitan Cavalry Command, and married a granddaughter of the Wuyue king Qian Chu.
