= Zhao Dezhao =

Chinese prince (951–979)

Zhao Dezhao 趙德昭
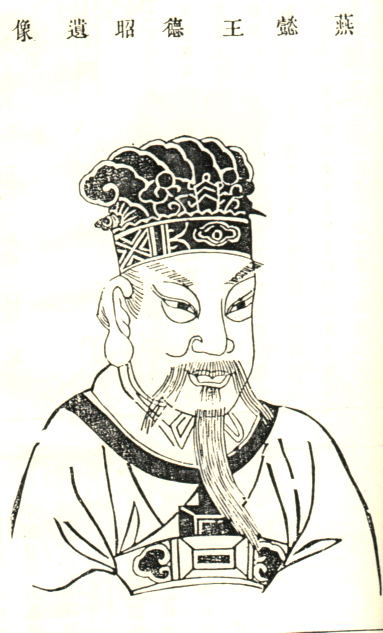
- A portrait from Zhao family genealogy (1919)
- Born: 951
- Died: 26 August 979 (aged 27–28)
Names
- Family name: Zhào (趙); Given name: Dézhāo (德昭); Courtesy name: Rìxīn (日新)
Posthumous name
- Prince of Wèi (魏王); Prince of Wú (吳王); Prince of Yuè (越王); Prince Yì of Yàn (燕懿王)
- House: Zhao
- Father: Emperor Taizu of Song

Zhao Dezhao (趙德昭) (951 – 26 August 979) was an imperial prince of the Chinese Song dynasty.

Officially the Prince Yi of Yan (燕懿王), he was the second son of Emperor Taizu and the crown prince since his elder brother died young. However, he did not succeed the throne after his father, as his uncle Emperor Taizong assumed power.

== Death ==
In 979, three years after his father's death, Zhao Dezhao was leading an army in Emperor Taizong's first campaign against the Khitans, when rumors spread in the army that Emperor Taizong had disappeared, and that Zhao Dezhao should be the new emperor. The rumors died when Emperor Taizong was found, however, and Emperor Taizong was very unhappy about the results of his campaign and refused to award the troops sparking complaints from them. On August 26, Zhao Dezhao went to inquire of the emperor, who either barked "You do that when you become the new emperor!" or "You may do it yourself after you have ascended the throne! There's still time for that!" Zhao Dezhao immediately went to his palace and asked his guards for a sabre. The guards told him that blades were not allowed in the palace, so Zhao Dezhao fetched a knife for cutting fruits, went to his room and then proceeded to slice his throat killing him. Upon hearing about the suicide, Emperor Taizong was very saddened and hugged the corpse crying while saying "Silly boy, how did you come to this depravity?"

However, as official history may not be trusted in events like this, some historians suspect that Zhao Dezhao was either murdered or forced to commit suicide by his uncle, who possibly was also involved in the deaths of Zhao Dezhao's father and younger brother. Zhao Defang, the last surviving son of Emperor Taizu, died two years after Zhao Dezhao. He was also in his 20s.

He was the ancestor of Zhao Yun and Zhao Qi who later became emperors. They were posthumously known as Emperor Lizong and Emperor Duzong respectively.

== Family ==
=== Parents ===
- Zhao Kuangyin, Taizu (太祖 趙匡胤; 21 March 927 – 14 November 976)
- Empress Xiaohui, of the He clan (孝惠皇后 賀氏; 929–958)

=== Consorts and issue ===
- Lady Wang, of the Wang clan (王氏), daughter of Wang Pu (王溥)
- Lady He, of the He clan (賀氏)
- Lady of Guo, of the Chen clan (国夫人 陈氏)
  - Zhao Weiji, Prince of Ji (冀王 趙惟吉; 966–1010), second son
- Lady Zhu, of the Zhu clan (朱氏)
- Unknown
  - Zhao Weizheng, Prince of Jing (靖王 趙惟正; d. 1032), first son
  - Zhao Weigu, Prince of Wei (魏王 趙惟固; d. 983), third son
  - Zhao Weizhong, Duke of Shu (舒國公 趙惟忠), fourth son
  - Zhao Weihe (趙惟和), Duke of Qingyuan (清源郡公), fifth son
