= Dragon Li =

Breed of domestic cat

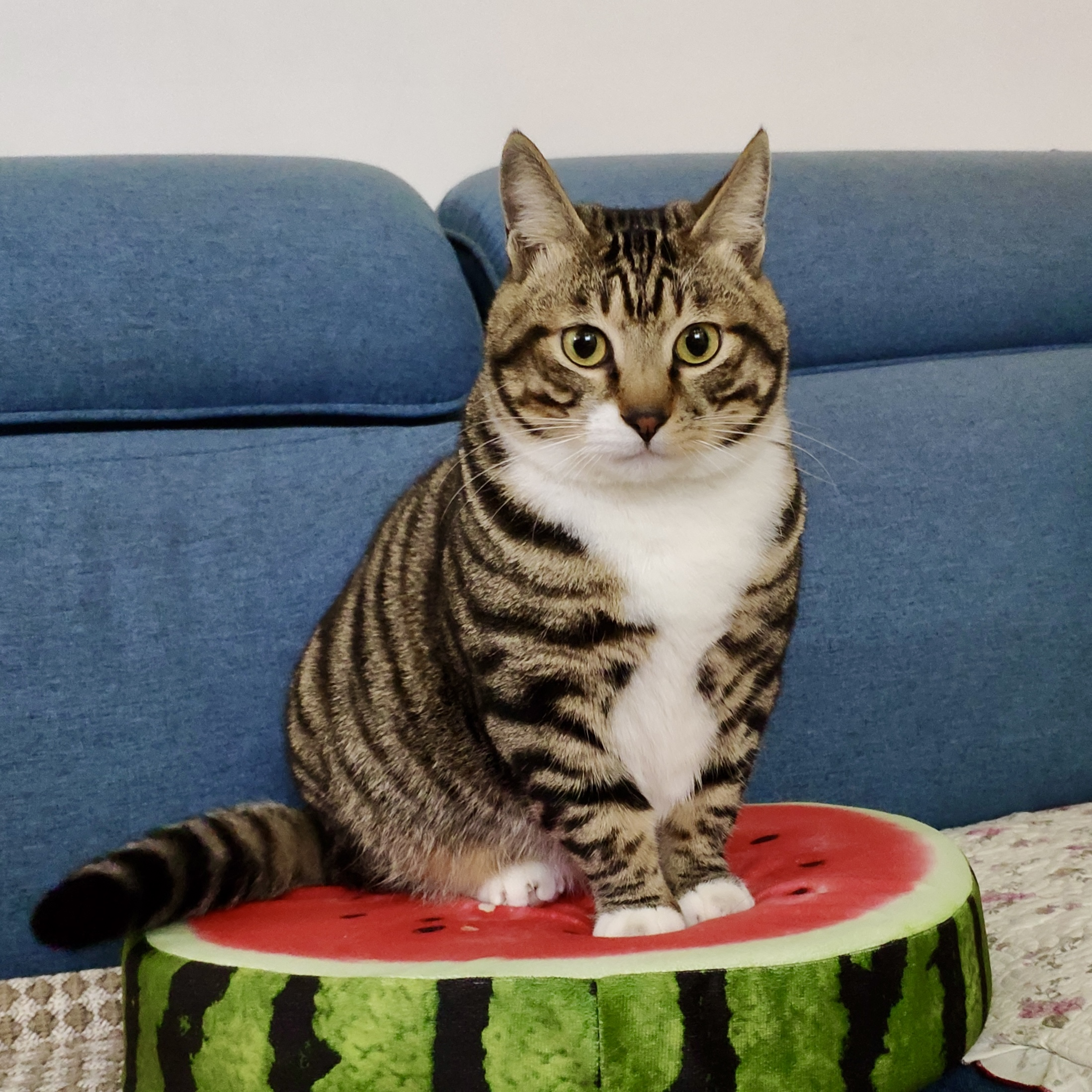
- Other names: Chinese Li Hua; Líhuā māo (貍花貓)
- Common nicknames: Chinese Fox Flower Cat
- Origin: China
- Foundation bloodstock: landrace population in China
- Breed status: Not recognised as a standardised breed by any major breed registry.

Breed standards
- CFA: historical standard

The Dragon Li, also called Chinese Li Hua or China Li Hua, is a recently established Chinese breed of domestic cat. It was developed in the early 2000s from a common landrace of cats in China, known as 貍花貓, Pinyin: líhuā māo (Li Hua Mao, literally 'leopard cat patterned cat'; sometimes shortened to 花貓 huā māo or 貍貓 lí māo). These native landrace cats are featured in some Chinese folklore stories.

The derived standardised breed is only recognised by China's breed registry called Cat Aficionado Association (CAA). After a short international show and breeding period between 2010 to 2015 with the Cat Fanciers' Association (CFA), the breed was eventually removed from the registry due to the limited development in both population size and breeder support. As a result it is not recognised by any of the major cat breed registries.

This cobby-built cat with a shorthaired coat sports a characteristic black mackerel tabby pattern. They have large brown, yellow or green almond shaped eyes.

== History ==
=== Origin ===
The Chinese character interpretation is based on a legendary description rather than a fully accurate contemporary portrayal of the lí hua māo, and as a result, this cat had been confused with the wild fox by the Chinese. Hence its nickname 'Fox Flower Cat'. For this reason, the literal translated characters for lí hua māo read as 貍 referred as 'Common raccoon dog'; 花 from 花纹 for 'pattern', referring to raccoon patterns; and 貓 'cat'. It was also claimed to originate from the hybridisation of the domestic cat and wild Chinese Mountain cat (Felis catus × F. bieti).

Li hua mao is the prevalent name for the original landrace in China. More recently, the names Chinese Li Hua and Dragon Li have been used internationally for the standardised breed. The dragon is a potent symbol in Chinese folklore, standing for power and good luck.

=== Breed development ===
==== China ====
The Dragon Li debuted as an experimental-class standardised breed in Beijing, China, in January 2004. All-breed Judges Dolores Kennedy and Barb Belanger of the American Cat Fanciers Association (ACFA) were guests of the Cat Aficionado Association (CAA) and judged the event.

In 2005, a male specimen named Needy, presented by its owner Da Han, was shown and won its class as first place CAA champion. The event was judged by John Douglas Blackmore of the ACFA. Needy was then "married" to a breeding partner in an elaborate mockup of a traditional Chinese wedding ceremony, attracting some press coverage. Since gaining international recognition, and due in part to its limited availability, the Dragon Li / Chinese Li Hua had become of interest to cat fanciers internationally.

==== International ====
In February 2010, the Li Hua was accepted for showing in the Miscellaneous class by the international (US-based) Cat Fanciers' Association (CFA). In February 2015, the CFA evaluated the breed over a five-year period in a board meeting. Concluding that the Chinese Li Hua showed limited development in both population size and breeder support. Annual show participation remained low, with approximately 8 to 14 unique cats exhibited per year and an estimated total of around 50 individual cats across the entire period. Breeding activity was minimal, with only one active breeder reported in the United States and declining engagement from key contributors in China. Early positive assessments from judges diminished over time, with more recent evaluations becoming predominantly negative and noting a lack of consistency with the original breed standard. Overall, the breed failed to demonstrate sustained growth, broad support, or distinctiveness, leading to recommendations for its removal from miscellaneous status. As a result it was decided to "remove the Chinese Li Hua from Miscellaneous status effective 1 May 2015". As the CFA was the only international organisation that registered the breed's pedigree, this decision indirectly ended the official international support for the breed.

== Characteristics ==
The Li Hua is a natural domestic cat breed originating from China, historically widespread and valued as a capable hunter. It is a sturdy, well-proportioned cat with a gentle temperament and relatively slow maturation, taking up to three years. Females are typically smaller than males. The body is strong and rectangular with a wide chest and well-developed musculature, supported by a short, strong neck. Legs are straight and muscular, with the forelegs slightly shorter than the hind legs, and the paws are broad, large, and oval. The tail is slightly shorter than the body, without abrupt tapering.

The head is a broad modified wedge, slightly longer than wide, with a gently rising profile and a slightly shorter lower jaw, while maintaining a correct bite. Eyes are large, bright, almond-shaped, with the outer corners set higher than the inner corners. Eye colour ranges from green to yellow or brown, with green preferred. Ears are medium-sized, alert, moderately pointed, and broad at the base, with short hair and possible tufts.

The coat is short to medium in length, soft, dense, and silky, without an undercoat. The breed exhibits an agouti coat pattern, with banded hairs and colour variation between ground and pattern markings. The ground colour is brown-yellow with a characteristic "mouse coat" effect, and the pattern colour is darker brown to black. The pattern is a black ('brown') mackerel tabby with strong contrast and clarity, including facial "mascara" markings ("tears of the dragon"), a distinct dorsal stipe, at least one unbroken necklace on the chest, vertical body striping, and ringed legs and tail with a black tip. Paw pads and toe hair are black. Any colour or pattern other than black mackerel tabby is not allowed.

== Popular culture ==
The Chinese literary legend "The Cat for Crown Prince Conspiracy" (狸貓換太子 Lí Māo Huàn Tài Zĭ) utilises a lí hua māo as its central theme.
