= Empress Xiaohui (Song) =

Chinese Empress (929 AD - 958 AD)

Lady He 賀氏
- Born: 929; Kaifeng, China
- Died: 958 (aged 28–29)
- Burial: Gongyi, Henan, China
- Spouse: Emperor Taizu
- Issue: Zhao Dexiu; Zhao Dezhao; Zhao Delin; Princess Xiansu; Princess Xianjing
Posthumous name
- Empress Xiàohui (孝惠皇后)
- Father: He Jingsi (賀景思)

Lady He (Chinese: 賀氏; c. 929 CE–25 January 958 CE), posthumously known as Empress Xiaohui (Chinese: 孝惠皇后), was the first wife of Emperor Taizu of the Song dynasty. She was the daughter of He Jingsi (賀景思) and sister of the general He Lingtu (賀令圖).

== Life ==
Lady He was the eldest daughter of He Jingsi. She was born in Bianjing, present-day Kaifeng, Henan Province. In Kaifeng, she met her future husband, Zhao Kuangyin. She had two older brothers: He Huaipu (賀懷浦) and He Lingtu (賀令圖). Zhao's family moved from Luoyang to Kaifeng. Lady He and her future husband grew up together. He Jingsi and Zhao Kuangyin's father's were colleagues and worked together as palace guards during the Later Tang dynasty.

They married when she was 16. The two were deeply in love and their marriage was happy. Lady He was born with a weak body although she gave birth to 3 sons and 2 daughters. Sadly, Lady He died before his ascension, of unknown causes at age thirty. When Zhao Kuangyin ascended the throne, she was posthumously honoured as Empress Xiaohui. She was buried in the An Mausoleum.

== Title ==
- During the reign of Emperor Mingzong of Later Tang (3 June 926– 15 December 933):
  - Lady He (賀氏; from 929)
- During the reign of Emperor Gaozu of Later Jin (28 November 936 – 28 July 942):
  - Wife of Zhao Kuangyin (为妻; from 944)
- During the reign of Emperor Shizong of Later Zhou (26 February 954 – 27 July 959):
  - Lady of Kuaiji County (會稽郡夫人; from 956)
- During the reign of Emperor Taizu of Song (4 February 960– 14 November 976):
  - Empress Xiàohui (孝惠皇后 賀氏, from 960)

== Descendants ==
- Zhao Dexiu, Prince Teng (滕王 趙德秀), Taizu Emperor's first son
- Zhao Dezhao, Prince Yanyi (燕懿王 趙德昭; 951–979), Taizu Emperor's second son
- Zhao Delin, Prince Shu (舒王 趙德林), Taizu Emperor's third son
- Princess Xiansu (賢肅帝姬; d. 1008), Taizu Emperor 's first daughter
- Princess Xianjing (賢靖帝姬; d. 1009), Taizu Emperor's second daughter

== Bibliography ==
- Li Tao (1183). Extended Continuation to Zizhi Tongjian (in Chinese). Vol. 7.
- Lee, Lily Xiao Hong; Wiles, Sue (2015-01-28). Biographical Dictionary of Chinese Women, Volume II. Routledge. doi:10.4324/9781315719313. ISBN 978-1-317-51562-3.
