= Empress Liu (Zhenzong) =

Empress Zhangxian Mingsu 章獻明肅皇后

Regent of the Song dynasty
- Regency: 23 March 1022 – 30 April 1033 (11 years, 38 days)
- Monarchs: Emperor Renzong

Empress dowager of the Song dynasty
- Tenure: 23 March 1022 – 30 April 1033 (11 years, 38 days)

Empress consort of the Song dynasty
- Tenure: 7 January 1013 – 23 March 1022 (9 years, 75 days)
- Born: 16 February 970; Jiaozhou, Song Empire (modern Leshan, Sichuan, China)
- Died: 30 April 1033 (aged 63); Kaifeng, Song Empire (modern Kaifeng, Henan, China)
- Burial: Yongding Mausoleum (永定陵)
- Spouse: Gong Mei; Emperor Zhenzong of Song
- Father: Liu Tong (劉通)
- Mother: Lady Pang (龐)

Empress Zhangxian Mingsu (希章獻明肅皇后, translated as "The orderly, worthy, wise and solemn empress"), more commonly known as Empress Liu (劉皇后), was an empress of the Song dynasty, married to the Emperor Zhenzong in 1012 and quickly gained the emperor's trust to discuss government matters. She ruled unofficially as the regent of China during the illness of Emperor Zhenzong from 1020 until 1022, and then officially as regent during the minority of Emperor Renzong from 1022 until her own death on 30 April 1033. As a regent, she commanded in her own name, not the name of the young emperor; she became the second woman in Chinese history to wear the imperial robe, after Wu Zetian, the only empress regnant in Chinese history. In a 2001 study, John Chaffee argued that Empress Liu's rise from an humble entertainer to a de facto ruler was a great success story in China's history, and that she made regency a "safe option" at times when "normal imperial rule was impossible."

== Early life ==
Orphaned in infancy, Lady Liu was raised by maternal relatives, and by adolescence she became a courtesan skilled at hand-drums. She married Gong Mei (龔美), a silversmith who took her to the capital Kaifeng, where in 983, she entered the palace of Prince Xiang(襄王) Zhao Yuanxiu, the future Emperor Zhenzong. According to anecdotes in historian Sima Guang's Sushui Jiwen, Gong Mei sold Lady Liu out of poverty, probably first to Zhang Qi (張耆), an official in the prince's palace.

The 15-year-old Zhao Yuanxiu was greatly enamored of the 14-year-old entertainer. Once, the emperor remarked that his son was getting "listless and thinner", and Zhao Yuanxiu's strict wet nurse, apparently out of disapproval of Lady Liu, promptly blamed her in front of the emperor. Lady Liu was forced to leave the palace, but the prince kept her at the house of Zhang Qi, who begrudgingly accepted her only after receiving 500 ounces of silver for the construction of a separate residence, so as to circumvent the emperor's order.

== As imperial consort and empress ==
Zhao Yuanxiu, who later changed his name to Zhao Heng, became emperor after his father's death in 997. Returning to his side, Lady Liu was given the title of a minor consort, "Beautiful Lady" (美人, Meiren) in 1004 and further promoted to "Cultivated Deportment" (修儀, Xiuyi) in 1009. As Empress Guo had died in 1007, the emperor wanted to make Lady Liu the empress, but gave in after strong ministerial opposition.

In 1010, one of Lady Liu's servants, Lady Li, gave birth to a son, fathered by the emperor. Already in her 40s and childless, Lady Liu adopted the infant and cared for him like her own. In 1012 she was promoted "Virtuous Consort Liu" (劉德妃, Liu Defei), and several months later, she became the empress.

Liu was described as naturally alert and perceptive, with a good judgement and an ability to make quick decisions. She demonstrated these qualities in handling the palace affairs as empress, and she also learned enough to be able to understand and discuss the state affairs with the emperor. This made him trust her with political tasks during his illness.

== Empress regent ==
=== Regent for Emperor Zhenzong ===
In 1020, Emperor Zhenzong became affected by an illness, which was to cause his death two years later, and unable to handle the affairs of state. By this time, the empress was already established as power behind the throne and handled all affairs of state. She was to rule officially as powerful empress and unofficially as regent of China for the two remaining years of his life.

=== Regent for Emperor Renzong ===
In 1022, Emperor Zhenzong was succeeded by Emperor Renzong, who was twelve years old and therefore not of legal majority for another five years. In the will of Emperor Zhenzong it was stated:

"The crown prince sits on the throne in front of my coffin. Empress Liu is revered as the empress dowager and takes power over all military and civil affairs."

Empress Dowager Liu now openly and officially assumed all power as regent of China during Renzong's minority, fully unrestricted. She enjoyed all the imperial prerogatives and honors: she held court (with the child emperor by her side or often just herself); she addressed herself as zhen (Chinese: 朕; pinyin: zhèn), a first-person pronoun reserved for the use of the emperor after the Qin dynasty; officials addressed her as Imperial Majesty (Chinese: 陛下; pinyin: Bìxià), an honorific used when addressing the emperor, not Imperial Highness (Chinese: 殿下; pinyin: Diànxià), an honorific used when addressing the empress or empress dowager; the edicts (敕; chi) she issued were referred to as zhe (制), meaning the personal orders of the emperor; she had her birthday celebrated with special names; she had envoys sent in her own name; and she even attended to the holy plowing ceremony and the imperial ancestral worship, all of which was normally only done by a ruling emperor. As regent she became the second woman in Chinese history to wear the imperial robe, after Wu Zetian. According to the tradition of the emperors, but not of empresses or empresses dowager, in order to build seven temples for her seven generations of ancestors and to worship them with imperial titles, Empress Dowager Liu promoted them to equals of the imperial ancestors. This act was similar to that of Empress Lü of Han and Empress Wu of Tang, both of whom were known for their absolutist and ruthless reigns.

As a politician, Empress Liu has been described as a competent regent. Reportedly, she had the ability to appoint able officials and discharge unable ones; to listen, accept and sometime adhere to criticism despite being of a fierce temperament. She was however, criticized for having usurped the imperial ceremonies and had herself worshiped as if she were an emperor, and because she appointed her relatives, who were of a poor background and considered vulgar, to high offices.

As the emperor was twelve years old at the time of his succession, and was legally due to be declared of legal majority at seventeen, she would normally had been expected to step down as regent after five years: however, she refused to do so, and continued to rule until her death. When she died, she left instructions that Consort Yang was to succeed her as the regent of the emperor, but the emperor refused to honor her will.

During her lifetime, Emperor Renzong had falsely believed that she was his biological mother, and did not find out otherwise until after her death, which caused him to react with rage. He demoted Liu's relatives and followers and posthumously elevated Lady Li to the rank of empress.

== Titles ==
- During the reign of Emperor Taizu of Song (4 February 960 – 14 November 976):
  - Liu E (刘娥; from 968)
  - Lady Liu (劉氏; from 968)
- During the reign of Emperor Zhenzong of Song (8 May 997 – 23 March 1022):
  - Beauty (美人; from 1004)
  - Lady of Cultivated Deportment (修儀; from 1009)
  - Virtuous Consort Liu (劉德妃; from 1012)
  - Empress (皇后; from December 1012)
- During the reign of Emperor Renzong of Song (24 March 1022 – 30 April 1063)
  - Empress Dowager (皇太后: from 1022)
  - Empress Zhangxian Mingsu (章獻明肅皇后; from 1033)

== Ancestry ==
According to official history, Lady Liu's grandfather Liu Yanqing was a general during the Later Jin and Later Han dynasties. The family later moved from Taiyuan in the north to Jiaozhou in the southwest, where her father Liu Tong assumed office of prefectship, likely during the first years of the newly established Song dynasty which conquered the region in 965.

Alleged Ancestors of Empress Liu

16. Liu Zhi (劉質)
8. Liu Weiyue (劉維嶽)
4. Liu Yanqing (劉延慶)
9. Lady Song (宋)
2. Liu Tong (劉通)
5. Lady Yuan (元)
1. Empress Liu
3. Lady Pang (龐)

== Bibliography ==
- Chaffee, John (2001). "The Rise and Regency of Empress Liu (969–1033)". Journal of Song-Yuan Studies (31): 1–25.
- (in Chinese) Toqto'a; et al., eds. (1345). Song Shi (宋史) [History of Song].

Chinese royalty
Preceded by Empress Guo	Empress of China; 7 January 1013 – 23 March 1022	Succeeded by Empress Guo (Renzong)
