= Emperor Taizu of Song =

Emperor of China from 960 to 976

Emperor Taizu of Song 宋太祖
- Palace portrait on a hanging scroll, kept in the National Palace Museum, Taipei, Taiwan

Emperor of the Song dynasty
- Reign: 4 February 960 – 14 November 976
- Coronation: February 960
- Successor: Emperor Taizong
- Born: Zhao Kuangyin; 21 March 927; Luoyang, Later Tang dynasty
- Died: 14 November 976 (aged 49); Bianjing, Northern Song dynasty
- Burial: Yongchang Mausoleum (永昌陵, in present-day Gongyi, Henan)
- Consorts: Empress Xiaohui (m. 944; died 958); Empress Xiaoming (m. 958; died 964); Empress Xiaozhang (m. 968–976)
- Issue: Zhao Dezhao; Zhao Defang; Princess Xiansu; Princess Xianjing; Princess Xianhui
Era dates
- Jianlong (建隆; 4 February 960 – 3 December 963); Qiande (乾德; 4 December 963 – 15 December 968); Kaibao (開寶; 16 December 968 – 21 January 977)
Posthumous name
- Emperor Qiyun Liji Yingwu Ruiwen Shende Shenggong Zhiming Daxiao (啓運立極英武睿文神德聖功至明大孝皇帝)
Temple name
- Taizu (太祖)
- House: Zhao
- Dynasty: Song (Northern Song)
- Father: Zhao Hongyin
- Mother: Empress Dowager Zhaoxian

Emperor Taizu of Song
- Chinese: 宋太祖
- Literal meaning: "Great Progenitor of the Song"
Transcriptions
Standard Mandarin
- Hanyu Pinyin: Sòng Tàizǔ
- Gwoyeu Romatzyh: Sonq Taytzuu
- Wade–Giles: Sung^{4} T‘ai^{4}-tsu^{3}
- IPA: [sʊ̂ŋ tʰâɪ.tsù]
Yue: Cantonese
- Yale Romanization: Sung Taaihjóu
- Jyutping: Sung^{3} Taai^{6}-zou^{2}
- IPA: [sʊŋ˧ tʰaj˧.tsɔw˧˥]
Southern Min
- Tâi-lô: Sòng Thài-tsó

Zhao Kuangyin
- Traditional Chinese: 趙匡胤
- Simplified Chinese: 赵匡胤
Transcriptions
Standard Mandarin
- Hanyu Pinyin: Zhào Kuāngyìn
- Gwoyeu Romatzyh: Jaw Kuangyinn
- Wade–Giles: Chao^{4} K‘uang^{1}-yin^{4}
- IPA: [ʈʂâʊ kʰwáŋ.în]
Yue: Cantonese
- Yale Romanization: Jiuh Hōngyahn
- Jyutping: Ziu^{6} Hong^{1}-jan^{6}
- IPA: [tsiw˨ hɔŋ˥.jɐn˨]
Southern Min
- Tâi-lô: Tiō Khong-īn

Emperor Taizu of Song (21 March 927 – 14 November 976), personal name Zhao Kuangyin, courtesy name Yuanlang, was the founding emperor of the Song dynasty of China. He reigned from 960 until his death in 976. Formerly a distinguished military general of the Later Zhou dynasty, Emperor Taizu came to power after staging a coup d'état and forcing Emperor Gong, the last Later Zhou ruler, to abdicate the throne in his favor.

During his reign, Emperor Taizu conquered the states of Southern Tang, Later Shu, Southern Han, and Jingnan, thus reunifying most of China proper. To strengthen his control, he lessened the power of military generals and relied on civilian officials in administration. He was succeeded by his younger brother, Zhao Kuangyi (Emperor Taizong).

== Early life ==
Born in Luoyang to military commander Zhao Hongyin, Zhao Kuangyin grew up excelling in mounted archery. Once, riding an untamed horse without a bridle, he knocked his forehead on the wall above the: city gate and fell off, but recovered and chased the horse, eventually subduing it. In the mid-940s, he married Lady He on his father's arrangement. After wandering around for a few years, in 949 he joined the army of Guo Wei, a jiedushi (military governor) of the Later Han dynasty, and helped Guo quell Li Shouzhen's rebellion.

== Career under Later Zhou ==
In 951, Guo Wei rebelled and created the Later Zhou dynasty. Because of his brilliant combat skills, Zhao Kuangyin was promoted to a palace guard commander. Chai Rong (Emperor Shizong of Later Zhou) frequently met Guo Wei and noticed Zhao Kuangyin's potential. Under his command, Zhao Kuangyin was made into a commander of the cavalry units. Under Chai Rong, Zhao Kuangyin's rise to power had begun.

Zhao Kuangyin's career started at the Battle of Gaoping, against the alliance of the Northern Han and Liao dynasties.

This rivalry started when Chai Rong ascended the throne and Liu Chong decided to work with the Liao dynasty. In the initial confrontation, the army's right flank, led by Fan Aineng (樊愛能) and He Hui (何徽), was defeated. Looking at the situation, Zhao Kuangyin and Zhang Yongde (張永德) led 4000 elite Palace troops to counter the Liao army. Zhao Kuangyin's exhortation for the loyalty to the emperor quickly strengthened morale. The small force held off the larger Liao army until reinforcements arrived. In the end, the successful counter repelled the Northern Han back to Taiyuan.

The victory raised Zhao Kuangyin up to the post of the grand commander of the palace guards, as well as reorganising and training them. More importantly, he developed the relations with other generals and officials related to the Chief of Palace, including Shi Shouxin, Wang Shenqi (王審琦), Yang Guangyi (楊光義), Wang Zhengzhong (王政忠), Liu Qingyi (劉慶義), Liu Shouzhong (劉守忠), Liu Yanrang (劉延讓), Mi Xin (米信), Tian Chongjin (田重進), Pan Mei, his brother Zhao Kuangyi, Shen Yilun (沈義倫), Lu Xuqing, Zhao Pu (趙普), Chu Zhaofu (楚昭輔). Within a few years, Zhao Kuangyin completely controlled the palace guards and even developed a set of officials under him with the people mentioned above.

Soon, he was promoted to a jiedushi (military governor), controlling most of the military power under Chai Rong. Nevertheless, he still had two rivals – Zhang Yongde (Guo Wei's son-in-law) and Li Chongjin (Guo Wei's nephew). In 959, after a trap set by Zhao Kuangyin, Zhang Yongde was demoted. After the death of Chai Rong, the Later Zhou throne was left to his seven-year-old son Guo Zongxun, and the second rival, Li Chongjin, soon found himself lacking the political backing. As a result, Zhao Kuangyin was able to use his influence to transfer Li Chongjin to Yang Prefecture as a jiedushi.

== Chenqiao Mutiny ==
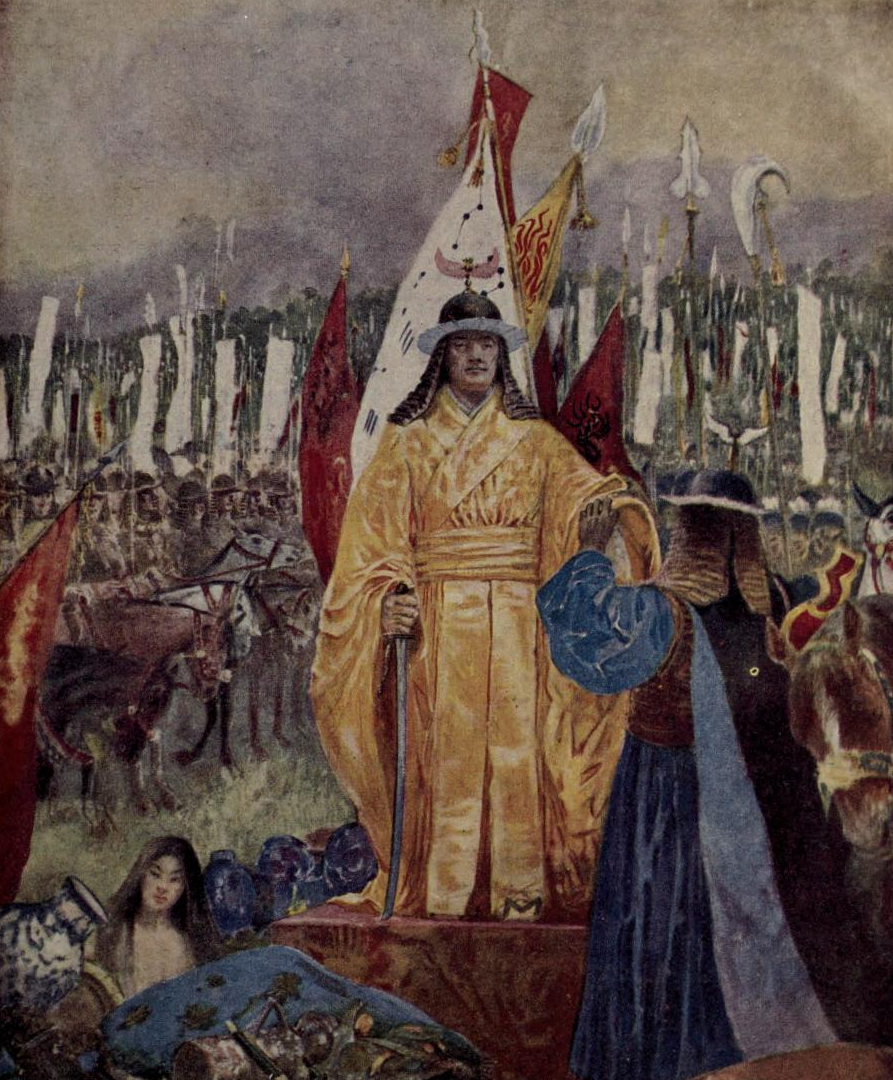
20th-century illustration of Zhao Kuangyin being proclaimed emperor by the army of the Later Zhou dynasty.

In 960, word reached the chancellor Fan Zhi that Northern Han and Liao dynasties were once again allied to invade them again. Without verifying the reliability of the hearsay, Fan Zhi sent Zhao Kuangyin to combat the alliance. After traveling 40 li, there was a clamour that a "prophet" saw two suns fighting, and that this meant the transfer of the Mandate of Heaven to Zhao Kuangyin. The story effectively spread around the army: there came discontent of the "command" of the young emperor and a shift of loyalty to Zhao Kuangyin.

A few days later, when Zhao Kuangyin was drunk in his tent, all the troops had not slept the whole night; they got their weapons and started yelling. Zhao Pu and Zhang Kuangyi, who were guarding the tent, saw the situation and went into the tent to wake up Zhao Kuangyin. When Zhao Kuangyin came out, all the troops yelled, "The army is without a master, we are willing to make the general the new emperor." Allegedly, Zhao Kuangyin took the power reluctantly, only under the urging of his soldiers. The midnight mutiny of officers forcibly urged Zhao Kuangyin to the throne; but, when the officers presented him to the troops as their new commander-in-chief he refused the imperial nomination until they swore unconditional obedience to him as leader. News of the rebellion soon reached the court and chaos erupted. The only person who thought about a resistance was Han Tong, but he was killed by one of Zhao Kuangyin's generals when he reached home.

Upon entering the capital to take his seat on the throne, Zhao Kuangyin made an executive order prohibiting the troops from looting the city or otherwise violating the rights of the population.

This coup would allow Zhao Kuangyin to become emperor in 960. With the gates opened for him, he became emperor with no resistance. Before the chancellor Fan Zhi could say anything, one of Zhao Kuangyin's generals pointed a sword at him and said, "We are without masters. Today, we must have an emperor." After the officials looked at each other and knew it was hopeless to resist; they all bowed down. With the court under control, Zhao Kuangyin was officially proclaimed emperor. The new dynasty's name, Song, was inspired by the army Zhao Kuangyin commanded in Song Prefecture.

After the declaration, Zhao Kuangyin sent the dethroned young emperor Guo Zongxun with his mother to the Western Capital (西京). He personally ordered the Zhao family to receive the Chai family into their family's care for generations.

== As emperor ==
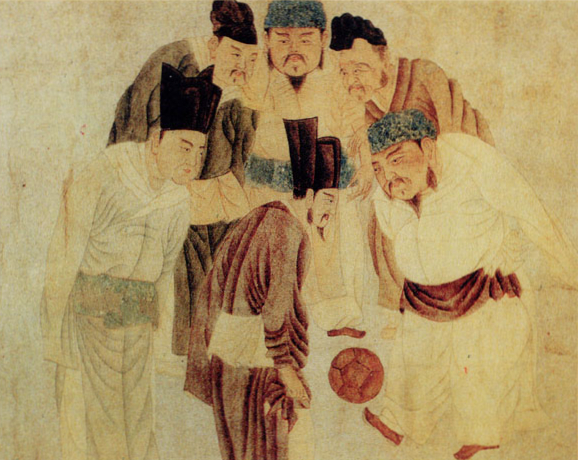
Emperor Taizu playing cuju with Zhao Pu, by the Yuan dynasty painter Qian Xuan (1235–1305)

In 960, Zhao Kuangyin helped reunite most of China proper after the fragmentation and rebellion between the fall of the Tang dynasty in 907 and the establishment of the Song dynasty. The plan set during Chai Rong's reign was to first conquer the north, then the south. During Emperor Taizu's reign, there was a change in strategy. He would conquer all the smaller states such as Later Shu, Southern Han and Southern Tang. The exception was the strong Northern Han in the north at Taiyuan supported by the Khitans of the Liao dynasty. Emperor Taizu's strategy was to win over the independent southern states as the south was weaker than the north as the Liao dynasty supported Northern Han.

In 968, Emperor Taizu personally led the army against the Northern Han. At first, his forces tore through the defences and placed Taiyuan under siege, but was ultimately forced to retreat after he struck against the defences of the Northern Han with the Liao cavalry coming in to support.

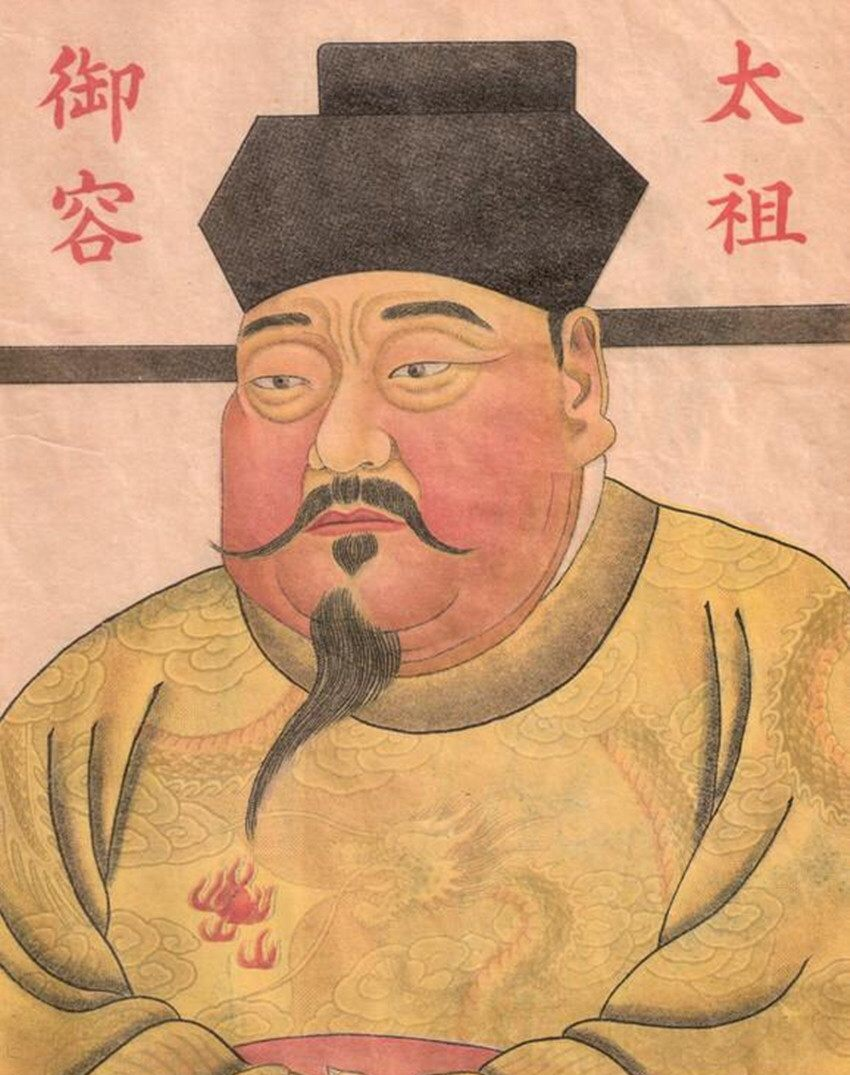
Portrait of Emperor Taizu, who founded the Song dynasty

Emperor Taizu established the core Song Ancestor Rules and Policy for the later Song emperors. He was remembered for his expansion of the imperial examination system such that most of the civil service were recruited through the exams (in contrast to the Tang where less than 10% of the civil servants came through exams). He also created academies that allowed a great deal of freedom of discussion and thought, which facilitated the growth of scientific advance, economic reforms as well as achievements in arts and literature.

Emperor Taizu is well known for bringing the power of the military under control, ending the era of the warlords, centralizing the state over regional commanders and so preventing anyone else rising to power as he did. Upon becoming emperor, he invited the general officers to a lavish banquet, where he convinced them all to retire as military leaders or accept minor posts, in favour of enjoying extensive estates and generous retirement funds and benefits which he then offered them. At a certain point during the feast, the new emperor made a speech to the military officers assembled there, which he began by expressing his deep gratitude to each and all of them for placing him on the throne, and that now that he had the power to do so, he wished to reward them to the utmost of his ability; then he went on to say that he thought the present company would all understand that he could not feel at ease on his new throne, with them continuing in command of their various armies of troops: and, he said, that if they duly considered the ramifications of the matter, neither would they. He then sincerely promised that they and their families would live in happiness and harmony, if they accepted his offer to retire with the stated benefits: eventually, none of the generals refused his terms, and thus began a period of relative internal peace within the realm for the duration of the Song dynasty which he thus founded, also better securing the military forces for involvement with the rival surrounding empires.

Many Song and later sources record the story of the "Taizu's Oath", which forbade his successors from killing scholar-officials. However, this story might be a later construct.

Emperor Taizu established a Reserve Treasury as a deposit treasury for the purpose of either attempting to purchase the Sixteen Prefectures or to recover them through funding military action. He launched a military expedition to recover them before his death, and his successor attempted twice more, leading to twenty-five years of sporadic fighting between the Song and the Khitan Liao.

== Death and succession dispute ==
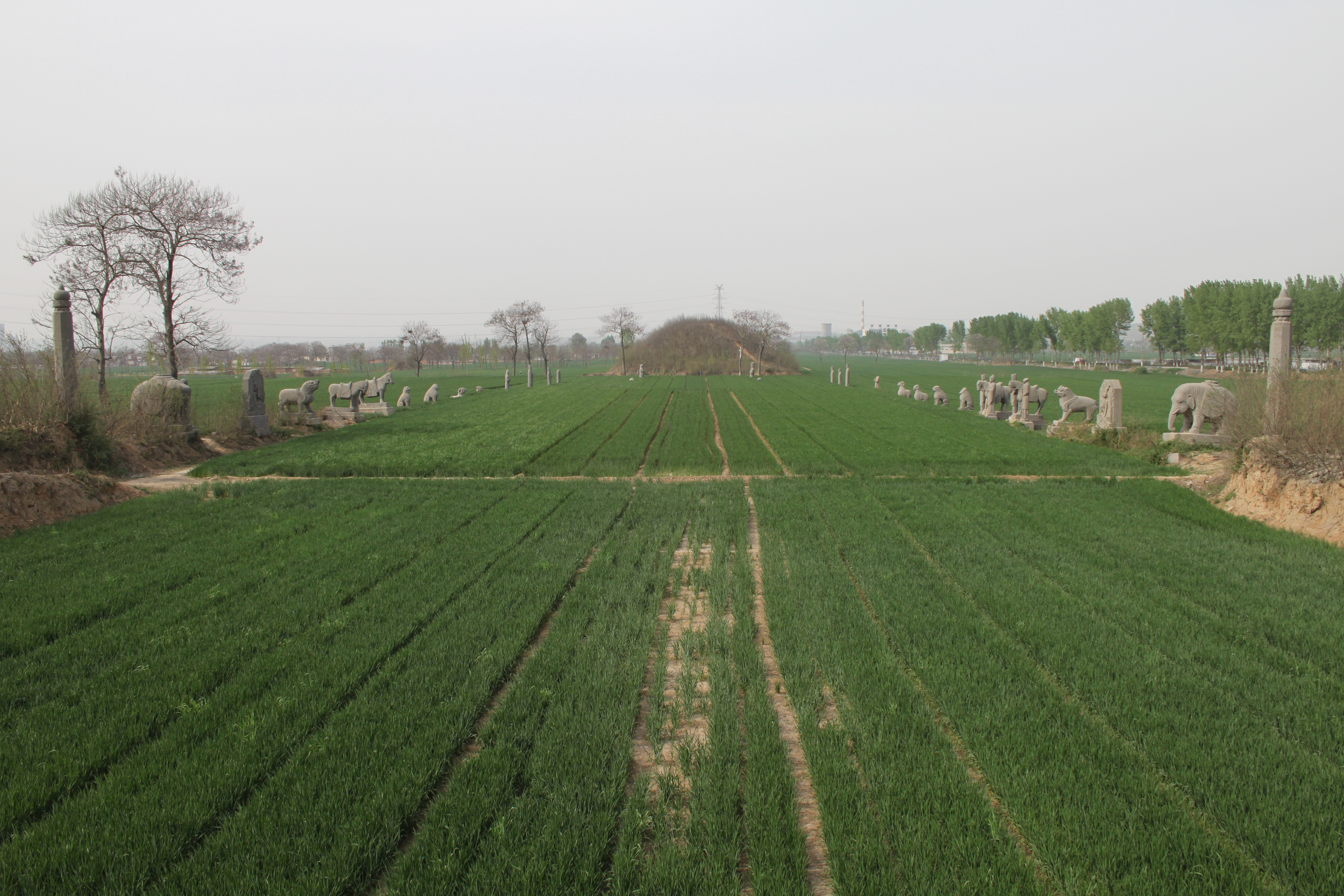
Tomb of Emperor Taizu in the Yongchang Mausoleum, Gongyi, Zhengzhou

Emperor Taizu reigned for seventeen years and died in 976 at the age of 49. Curiously, he was succeeded by his younger brother, Zhao Kuangyi (Emperor Taizong), even though he had two grown sons – Zhao Dezhao, the Prince of Yan (951–979), and Zhao Defang, the Prince of Qin (959–981). The traditional historical accounts place emphasis on the role Zhao Kuangyin's mother played in the decision which was made shortly after the Song dynasty was proclaimed (around 961). So for nearly his entire reign, it was known and accepted that Zhao Kuangyi would succeed him.

In folklore, the story known as "shadows by the candle and sounds from an axe" is very popular and suggests that Emperor Taizu was murdered by his brother, who was after the throne. After his death, Taizu was interred at the Yongchang Mausoleum, near Gongyi.

After Emperor Taizong, the line of succession passed on to his son and descendants rather than those of Emperor Taizu. However, when Emperor Gaozong (1127–1161) failed to produce an heir, he selected a descendant of Emperor Taizu to be his adopted heir to succeed him in 1161. After 1161, all the subsequent Song emperors were descended from Emperor Taizu through his two sons, Zhao Dezhao and Zhao Defang.

== Family ==
Song Taizu's mother, Empress Dowager Du

Zhao Kuangyin's family was of fairly modest origins and cannot be traced back with any certainty further than the Later Tang. His great great grandfather Zhao Tiao was an official who served in Zhuozhou in Hebei Province near where the family lived. His descendants Zhao Ting and Zhao Jing also served as local officials in Hebei Province. Zhao Jing's son Zhao Hongyin decided against a civil career and became a military officer instead under Zhuangzong of Later Tang: he knew that in times of disunity it would be a military career that would lead to success.

- Empress Xiaohui, of the He clan (孝惠皇后 賀氏; 929–958)
  - Zhao Dexiu, Prince of Teng (滕王 趙德秀), first son
  - Zhao Dezhao, Prince Yi of Yan (燕懿王 趙德昭; 951–979), second son
  - Zhao Delin, Prince of Shu (舒王 趙德林), third son
  - Princess Xiansu (賢肅帝姬; d. 1008), first daughter
    - Married Wang Chengyan (王承衍) in 970
  - Princess Xianjing (賢靖帝姬; d. 1009), second daughter
    - Married Shi Baoji (石保吉) in 972
- Empress Xiaoming, of the Wang clan (孝明皇后 王氏; 942–964)
  - Zhao Defang, Prince Kanghui of Qin (秦康惠王 趙德芳; 959–981), fourth son
  - Unnamed daughter
  - Unnamed daughter
- Empress Xiaozhang, of the Song clan (孝章皇后 宋氏; 952–995)
- Unknown
  - Princess Xianhui (賢惠帝姬; d. 999)
    - Married Wei Xianxin (魏咸信) in 972
  - Princess Anhui (安惠帝姬)
  - Princess Xianhui (顯惠帝姬)
  - Princess Xuanhui (宣惠帝姬)

== In popular culture ==
=== Religion ===
The Great Ancestor of the Song sometimes appears as a door god in Chinese and Taoist temples in partnership with Yang Gun.

=== Literature ===
The late 16th century novel by Xiong Damu (熊大木) called Records of the Two Songs, South and North (南北兩宋志傳) is a historical novel about imperial China from roughly 926 to 1022. The first 50 chapters detail the fall of Later Tang and the rise and fall of Later Jin, Later Han and Later Zhou, with a focus on the legends of Zhao Kuangyin. The last 50 chapters focus on the Generals of the Yang Family legends. As a result, the book is in later publications usually split in two separate parts under various different names.

A 1797 novel written by Wu Xuan (吳璿) called Legends of the Flying Dragon (飛龍傳) proved to be very popular in his time. He expanded the stories on Zhao Kuangyin in Xiong Damu's book and added a wuxia twist to it. Another novel Emperor Taizu of Song Thrice Sets off for Southern Tang, Trapped in Shouzhou City (宋太祖三下南唐被困壽州城) was written by an "Antiquarian Master" (好古主人) in 1858.

While these stories mostly use historical figures as supporting characters, a number of fictional characters became famously associated with Zhao Kuangyin:

- Zhao Jingniang (趙京娘), a beautiful teenage girl whom Zhao Kuangyin saved from kidnappers and protected during her journey home. She developed strong romantic feelings about Zhao Kuangyin, but he only regarded her as a younger sister. She eventually committed suicide when a misunderstanding occurred.
- Zheng En (鄭恩), courtesy name Ziming (子明), the third sworn brother of Zhao Kuangyin and Chai Rong in the stories. He is portrayed as dark-skinned, strong and loyal, with a simple temperament. He was accidentally killed by a drunk Zhao Kuangyin.

=== Martial arts ===
According to martial arts traditional lore, Emperor Taizu created a Shaolin-based fighting style known as Taizu Changquan (太祖長拳; literally "Taizu Long Fist"). It is the core style of the present-day Long Fist style. Whether he really did invent this style or if it even dates from this time is not actually known.

=== Films ===
A Chinese 4D film tentatively titled Unifying the Country (一統江山) is planned to be directed by Academy Award–winning Danish director Bille August. The film is said to center on Zhao Kuangyin as well as Li Yu (last ruler of Southern Tang) and Qian Chu (last ruler of Wuyue).

=== Television series ===
- Military Control (兵權), a 1988 Hong Kong series starring Gordon Liu as Zhao Kuangyin.
- Zhao Kuangyin (趙匡胤), a 1995 Chinese series starring Zhao Xiguang as Zhao Kuangyin.
- The Preordained Emperor (真命天子), a 1998 Taiwanese series starring Lin You-hsing as Zhao Kuangyin.
- Zhao Kuangyin (趙匡胤), a 2013 Chinese series starring Chen Jianbin as Zhao Kuangyin.
- A Change of Destiny is a 2007 TVB series in which Zhao Kuangyiin appears as a supporting character portrayed by Kwok Fung.

Three independent television series focused on the complex relationships between Zhao Kuangyin, Li Houzhu (Li Congjia) and the many women in their lives. They are:

- The Sword and the Song (絕代雙雄), a 1986 Singaporean series starring Lin Mingzhe as Zhao Kuangyin and Li Wenhai as Li Congjia
- Love, Sword, Mountain & River (情劍山河), a 1996 Taiwanese series starring Wu Hsing-kuo as Zhao Kuangyin and Chin Feng as Li Congjia
- Li Houzhu and Zhao Kuangyin (李後主與趙匡胤), a 2006 Chinese series starring Huang Wen-hao as Zhao Kuangyin and Nicky Wu as Li Congjia

== See also ==
- Architecture of the Song dynasty
- Chinese emperors family tree (middle)
- Culture of the Song dynasty
- Economy of the Song dynasty
- History of the Song dynasty
- List of emperors of the Song dynasty
- List of unsolved deaths
- Society of the Song dynasty
- Technology of the Song dynasty

Emperor Taizu of Song House of Zhao (960–1279) Born: 927 Died: 976
Regnal titles
Preceded by Dynasty created	Emperor of the Song Dynasty; 960–976	Succeeded by Emperor Taizong
Preceded by Emperor Gong of the Later Zhou	Emperor of China; 960–976	Succeeded by Emperor Taizong
