= Emperor Zhenzong =

Emperor of Song China from 997 to 1022

Emperor Zhenzong of Song 宋真宗
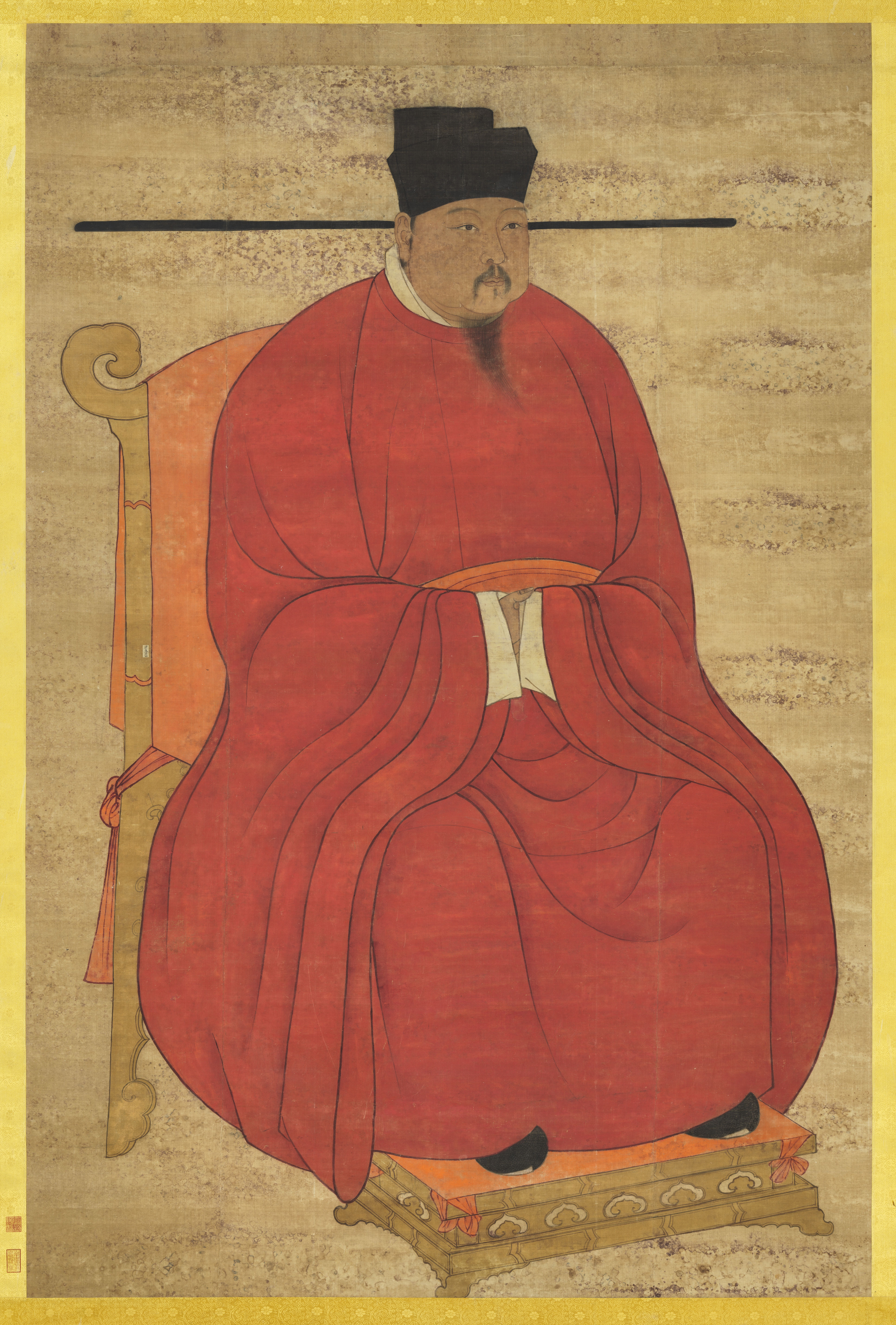
- Portrait on a hanging scroll, kept in the National Palace Museum, Taipei, Taiwan

Emperor of the Song dynasty
- Reign: 8 May 997 – 23 March 1022 (All with the Empress Liu)
- Coronation: 8 May 997
- Predecessor: Emperor Taizong
- Successor: Emperor Renzong
- Regent: Empress Liu
- Born: Zhao Dechang (968–983); Zhao Yuanxiu (983–986); Zhao Yuankan (986–995); Zhao Heng (995–1022); 23 December 968; Song dynasty
- Died: 23 March 1022 (aged 53); Song dynasty
- Burial: Yongding Mausoleum (永定陵, in present-day Gongyi, Henan)
- Consorts: Empress Zhanghuai; (m. 983; died 989); Empress Zhangmu; (m. 991; died 1007); Empress Zhangxian (before 1022) Empress Zhangyi (before 1022): Empress Zhanghui (m. 995–1022)
- Issue Detail: Emperor Renzong
Era dates
- Xianping (咸平; 998–1003); Jingde (景德; 1004–1007); Dazhongxiangfu (大中祥符; 1008–1016); Tianxi (天禧; 1017–1021); Qianxing (乾興; 1022)
Regnal name
- Emperor Chongwen Guangwu Shengming Renxiao (崇文廣武聖明仁孝皇帝); Emperor Chongwen Guangwu Yitian Zundao Baoying Zhangwei Shengming Renxiao(崇文廣武儀天尊道寶應章威聖明仁孝皇帝); Emperor Chongwen Guangwu Gantian Zundao Yingzhen Youde Shangsheng Qinming Renxiao (崇文廣武感天尊道應真佑德上聖欽明仁孝皇帝); Emperor Tiyuan Yuji Gantian Zundao Yingzhen Baoyun Wende Wugong Shangsheng Qinming Renxiao (體元御極感天尊道應真寶運文德武功上聖欽明仁孝皇帝); Emperor Yingtian Zundao Qinming Renxiao (應天尊道欽明仁孝皇帝)
Posthumous name
- Emperor Yingfu Jigu Shengong Rangde Wenming Wuding Zhangsheng Yuanxiao (膺符稽古神功讓德文明武定章聖元孝皇帝) (conferred in 1047)
Temple name
- Zhenzong (真宗)
- House: Zhao
- Dynasty: Song (Northern Song)
- Father: Emperor Taizong
- Mother: Empress Yuande

Emperor Zhenzong of Song
- Chinese: 宋真宗
- Literal meaning: "True Ancestor of the Song"
Transcriptions
Standard Mandarin
- Hanyu Pinyin: Sòng Zhēnzōng

Zhao Dechang
- Traditional Chinese: 趙德昌
- Simplified Chinese: 赵德昌
Transcriptions
Standard Mandarin
- Hanyu Pinyin: Zhào Déchāng

Zhao Yuanxiu
- Traditional Chinese: 趙元休
- Simplified Chinese: 赵元休
Transcriptions
Standard Mandarin
- Hanyu Pinyin: Zhào Yuánxiū

Zhao Yuankan
- Traditional Chinese: 趙元侃
- Simplified Chinese: 赵元侃
Transcriptions
Standard Mandarin
- Hanyu Pinyin: Zhào Yuánkǎn

Zhao Heng
- Traditional Chinese: 趙恆
- Simplified Chinese: 赵恒
Transcriptions
Standard Mandarin
- Hanyu Pinyin: Zhào Héng

Emperor Zhenzong of Song (23 December 968 – 23 March 1022), personal name Zhao Heng, was the third emperor of the Song dynasty of China. He reigned from 997 to his death in 1022. His personal name was originally Zhao Dechang, but was changed to Zhao Yuanxiu in 983, Zhao Yuankan in 986, and finally Zhao Heng in 995. He was the third son of his predecessor, Emperor Taizong, and was succeeded by his sixth son, Emperor Renzong at the end of his reign. From 1020 he was seriously ill, but retained power despite this. Because of his illness, day-to-day rule of China was often placed in the hands of his third wife, Empress Liu.

== Reign ==
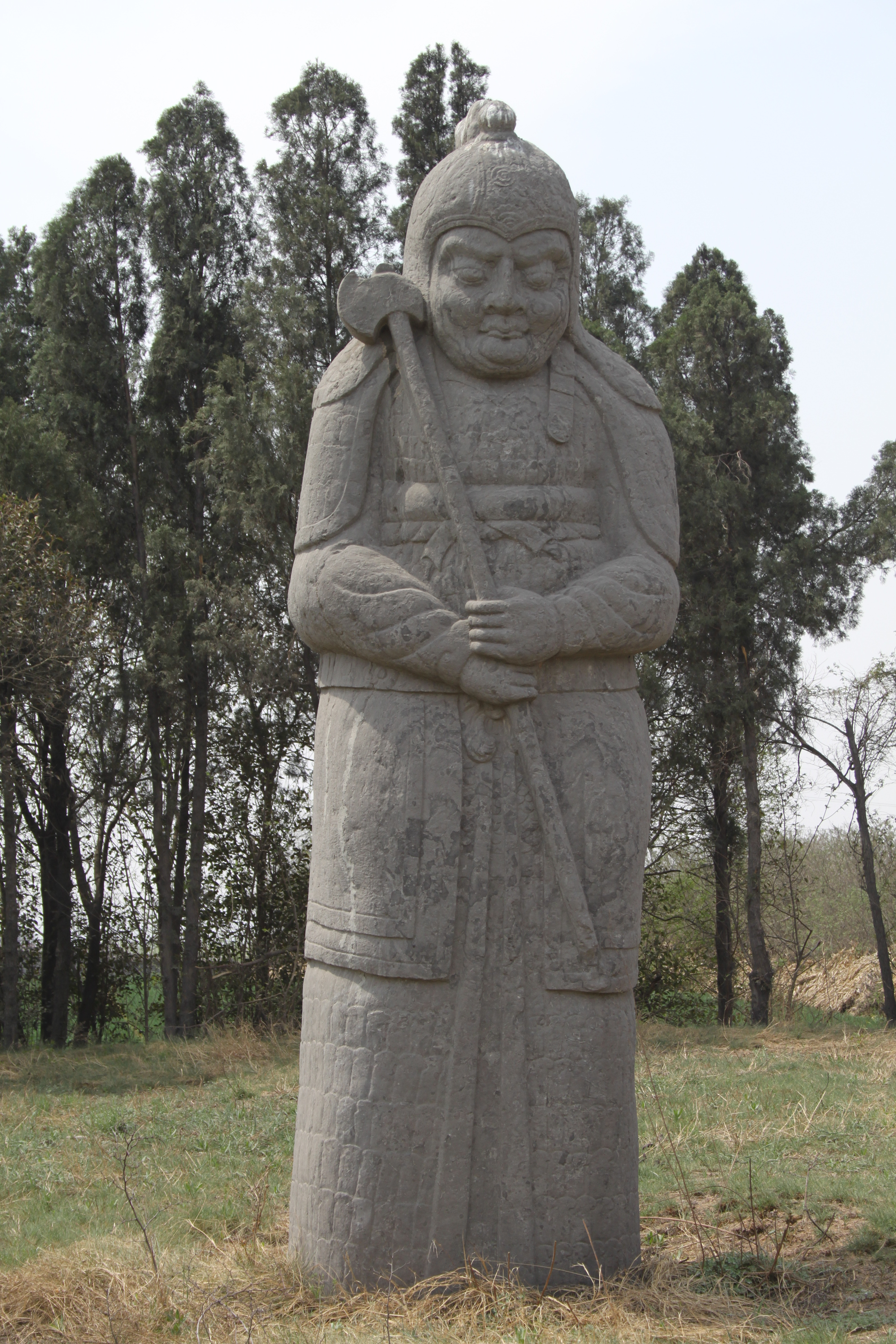
Tomb guardian at Emperor Zhenzong's tomb

Emperor Zhenzong's reign was noted for the consolidation of power and the strengthening of the Song Empire. The empire prospered, and its military might was further reinforced. However, it would also mark the beginning of a foreign policy towards the Khitan-led Liao dynasty in the north that would ultimately result in humiliation.

In 1004, the Khitans waged war against the Song Empire. Emperor Zhenzong, leading his army, struck back at the Khitans. Despite initial successes, in 1005, Emperor Zhenzong concluded the Chanyuan Treaty. The treaty resulted in over a century of peace, but at the price of the Song Empire agreeing to an inferior position to the Liao Empire, and also agreeing to pay an annual tribute of 100,000 ounces of silver and over 200,000 bolts of silk. The admission of inferiority would come to plague the foreign affairs of the Song Empire, while the payments slowly depleted the empire's coffers.

He was responsible for ordering the shipment of 30,000 bushels of quick-maturing rice seed from the Fujian Province to the lower Yangtze basin in 1011–1012, improving agriculture.

By the sixth year of the Dazhong Xiangfu period of Emperor Zhenzong (1013), officials were evaluated based on their tax targets. These targets varied and were adjusted according to changes in tax revenue. Typically, they were set as averages of the highest and lowest collections from three years.

Emperor Zhenzong stressed the importance of Taoism at his imperial court. It was during his reign that the so-called Heavenly Texts, which glorified the Zhao family, were allegedly discovered. This was followed up by imperial sacrificial ceremonies carried out at Mount Tai. From 1013 to 1015, the emperor issued official decrees deifying the Jade Emperor as the highest ruler of Heaven.

Champa rice was introduced to China from Champa during Emperor Zhenzong's reign.

=== Illness and death ===
In 1020, Emperor Zhenzong became affected by an illness which was to cause his death two years later and unable to handle the affairs of state. By this time, Zhenzong’s wife Empress Liu was already established as power behind the throne and handled the affairs of state. She continued to act unofficially as regent of China for the two remaining years of Zhenzong’s life.

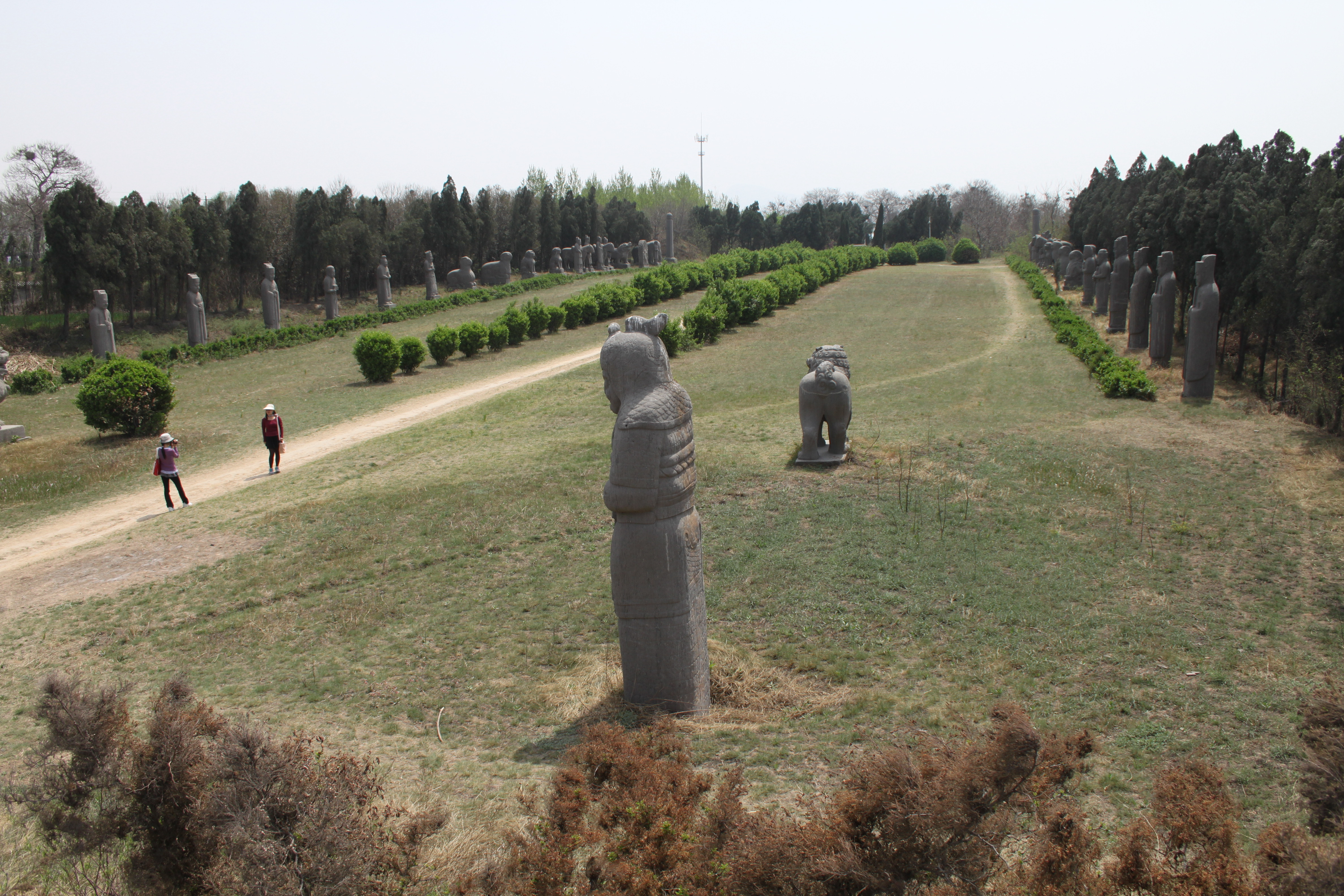
Tomb of Emperor Zhenzong

Zhenzong died in 1022 of his illness. He was succeeded by his 6th son, Zhao Zhen who took the throne as Emperor Renzong, but with actual power remaining in the hands of Empress Liu, who became empress dowager.

== Archaeology ==
A number of Chinese artefacts dating from the Tang dynasty and Song dynasty, some of which had been owned by Emperor Zhenzong, were excavated and came into the hands of the Kuomintang general Ma Hongkui, who refused to publicise the findings. Among the artefacts were a white marble tablet from the Tang dynasty, gold nails, and bands made out of metal. It was not until after Ma died that his wife went to Taiwan in 1971 from the United States to bring the artefacts to Chiang Kai-shek, who turned them over to the National Palace Museum.

== Family ==
- Empress Zhanghuai of the Pan clan (章懷皇后 潘氏; 968–989)
- Empress Zhangmu of the Guo clan (章穆皇后 郭氏; 975–1007)
  - Zhao You, Crown Prince Daoxian (悼獻皇太子 趙佑; 995–1003), second son
  - Unnamed son
  - Unnamed son
- Empress Zhangxian of the Liu clan (章獻皇后 劉氏; 968–1033), personal name E (娥)
- Empress Zhangyi of the Li clan (章懿皇后 李氏; 987–1032)
  - Zhao Zhen, Renzong (仁宗 趙禎; 1010–1063), sixth son
  - Princess Jingyi (靜一帝姬), first daughter
- Empress Zhanghui of the Yang clan (章惠皇后 楊氏; 984–1036)
- Noble Consort Zhaojing of the Shen clan (昭靜貴妃 沈氏; 994–1076)
- Able Consort of the Cao clan (贤妃 曹氏)
- Able Consort of the Chen clan (贤妃 陈氏)
- Noble Consort of the Du clan (貴妃 杜氏; d. 1046), personal name Qiongzhen (瓊真)
  - Princess Zhaohuai (昭懷帝姬; d. 1047), personal name Zhichong (志衝), second daughter
- Lady of Conducive Appearance of the Dai clan (順容戴氏)
- Beauty of the Xu clan (美人徐氏)
- Talented Lady of the Chen clan (才人陳氏)
- Unknown
  - Zhao Ti, Prince of Wen (溫王 趙禔), first son
  - Zhao Zhi, Prince of Chang (昌王 趙只), third son
  - Zhao Zhi, Prince of Xin (信王 趙祉), fourth son
  - Zhao Qi, Prince of Qin (欽王 趙祈), fifth son

Emperor Zhenzong House of Zhao (960–1279) Born: 997 Died: 1022
Regnal titles
Preceded by Emperor Taizong	Emperor of the Song Dynasty; 997–1022	Succeeded by Emperor Renzong
Preceded by Emperor Taizong	Emperor of China; 997–1022 (With the Empress Consort Liu)	Succeeded by Emperor Renzong
