= Gongyi =

Gongyi 巩义市
- County-level & Sub-prefectural city
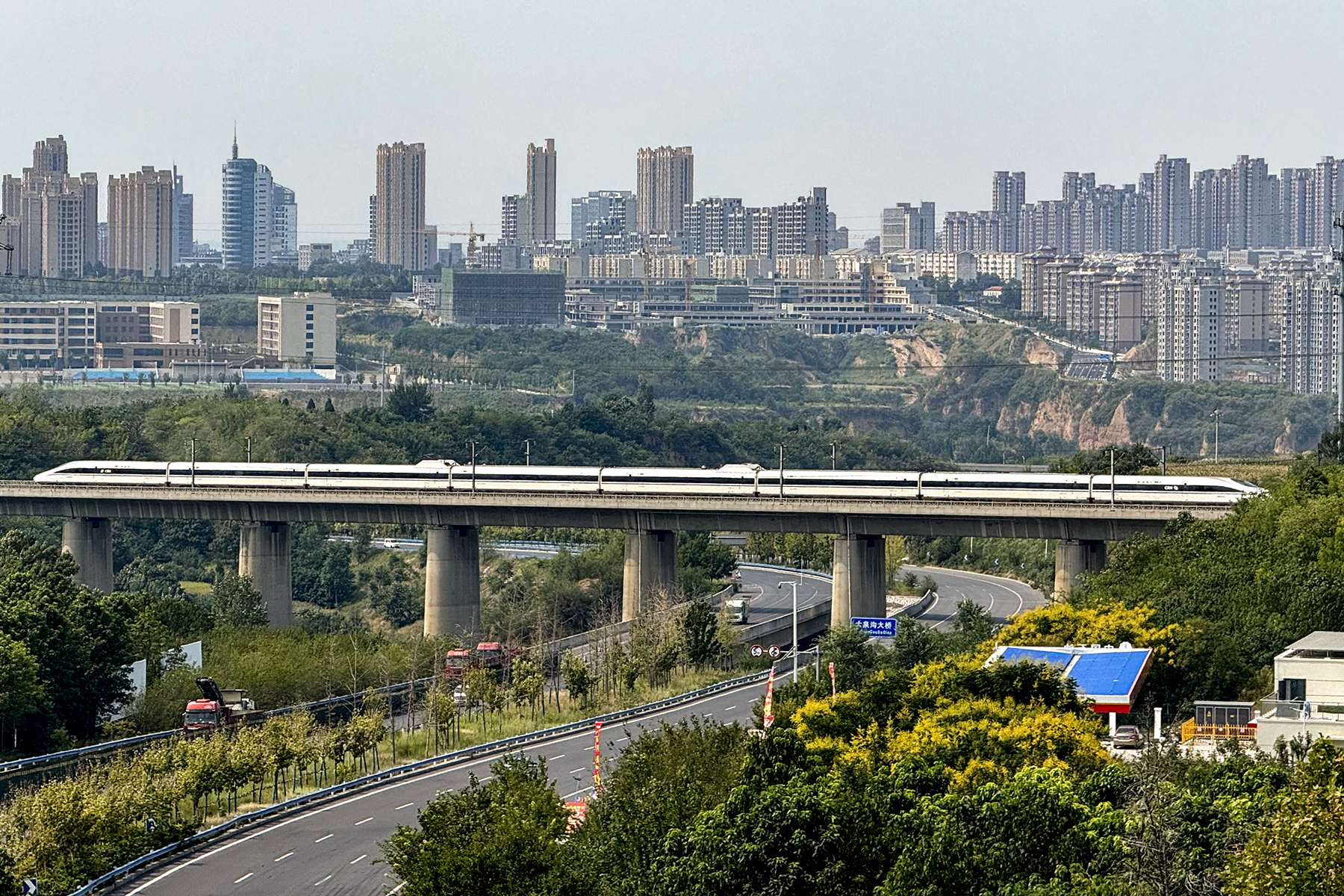
- Gongyi city skyline

- Location in Henan
- Coordinates: 34°46′N 112°58′E
- Country: People's Republic of China
- Province: Henan
- Prefecture-level city: Zhengzhou

Area
  - Total: 1,041 km^{2} (402 sq mi)

Population (2019)
  - Total: 843,900
  - Density: 810.7/km^{2} (2,100/sq mi)
- Time zone: UTC+8 (China Standard)
- Postal code: 451200
- Website: www.gongyi.gov.cn

Gongyi (simplified Chinese: 巩义市; traditional Chinese: 鞏義市; pinyin: Gǒngyì Shì), formerly Gong County (巩县; 鞏縣; Gǒngxiàn), is a county-level city of Henan Province, South Central China, under the administration of the prefecture-level city of Zhengzhou. It has a population of 790,000 people and an area of 1,041 km^{2} (402 sq mi).

== City ==
Gongyi is located in the middle of Henan province, on the northern side of Mount Song. The Yellow River runs through the northern part of the city. Zhengzhou city proper lies 82 km (51 mi) to the east and Luoyang 76 km (47 mi) to the west.

The city was once known as Zhenxun (斟鄩), and was reputedly capital of China during part of the Xia dynasty. According to the Bamboo Annals, Houyi occupied Zhenxun with his forces while the Xia king Taikang was off hunting beyond the Luo River. He was then usurped by his lieutenant Han Zhuo and his son before the Xia were eventually restored.

The celebrated Song tombs are scattered through the towns (zhen) of Xicun, Zhitian, and Huiguo. They are the resting place for 7 emperors of the Northern Song dynasty and the father of the dynasty's founder. There are also the graves of loyal ministers of the Song.

After the founding of the People’s Republic of China, Gongyi was placed under the jurisdiction of Zhengzhou but came under the control of Kaifeng in January 1955 before reverting to Zhengzhou in August 1983. In 1991, Gongyi became a county-level city, still under the jurisdiction of Zhengzhou.

Gongyi is thought to be the birthplace of the Tang dynasty poet Du Fu, often considered China's greatest poet.

== Administrative divisions ==
As of 2012, this city is divided to 5 subdistricts and 15 towns.

Subdistricts

- Xinhua Road Subdistrict (新华路街道)
- Dufulu Subdistrict (杜甫路街道)
- Yong'anlu Subdistrict (永安路街道)
- Xiaoyi Subdistrict (孝义街道)
- Zijinglu Subdistrict (紫荆路街道)

Towns

- Mihe (米河镇)
- Xinzhong (新中镇)
- Xiaoguan (小关镇)
- Zhulin (竹林镇)
- Dayugou (大峪沟镇)
- Heluo (河洛镇)
- Zhanjie (站街镇)
- Tangdian (康店镇)
- Beishankou (北山口镇)
- Xicun (西村镇)
- Zhitian (芝田镇)
- Huiguo (回郭镇)
- Luzhuang (鲁庄镇)
- Jiajinkou (夹津口镇)
- Shecun (涉村镇)

== Climate ==
Climate data for Gongyi, elevation 165 m (541 ft), (1991–2020 normals, extremes 1981–2010)
Month	Jan	Feb	Mar	Apr	May	Jun	Jul	Aug	Sep	Oct	Nov	Dec	Year
Record high °C (°F)	18.7 (65.7)	23.0 (73.4)	30.4 (86.7)	37.4 (99.3)	40.4 (104.7)	42.2 (108.0)	40.4 (104.7)	39.4 (102.9)	38.3 (100.9)	34.7 (94.5)	27.6 (81.7)	22.5 (72.5)	42.2 (108.0)
Mean daily maximum °C (°F)	6.2 (43.2)	10.1 (50.2)	16.1 (61.0)	23.0 (73.4)	28.3 (82.9)	32.6 (90.7)	32.6 (90.7)	30.9 (87.6)	27.0 (80.6)	21.5 (70.7)	14.3 (57.7)	8.2 (46.8)	20.9 (69.6)
Daily mean °C (°F)	1.2 (34.2)	4.6 (40.3)	10.2 (50.4)	16.7 (62.1)	22.1 (71.8)	26.6 (79.9)	27.6 (81.7)	26.0 (78.8)	21.5 (70.7)	15.8 (60.4)	8.9 (48.0)	3.1 (37.6)	15.4 (59.7)
Mean daily minimum °C (°F)	−2.5 (27.5)	0.4 (32.7)	5.3 (41.5)	11.2 (52.2)	16.6 (61.9)	21.1 (70.0)	23.5 (74.3)	22.2 (72.0)	17.3 (63.1)	11.6 (52.9)	4.9 (40.8)	−0.6 (30.9)	10.9 (51.7)
Record low °C (°F)	−10.6 (12.9)	−10.2 (13.6)	−5.1 (22.8)	0.2 (32.4)	6.9 (44.4)	12.8 (55.0)	16.5 (61.7)	12.9 (55.2)	8.5 (47.3)	−0.2 (31.6)	−6.0 (21.2)	−11.0 (12.2)	−11.0 (12.2)
Average precipitation mm (inches)	8.3 (0.33)	10.7 (0.42)	20.0 (0.79)	34.4 (1.35)	54.1 (2.13)	65.4 (2.57)	119.2 (4.69)	115.8 (4.56)	74.6 (2.94)	38.4 (1.51)	24.6 (0.97)	5.9 (0.23)	571.4 (22.49)
Average precipitation days (≥ 0.1 mm)	3.5	3.9	4.9	5.6	7.0	7.8	11.0	10.7	9.1	6.6	5.2	3.1	3.1
Average snowy days	4.0	3.3	1.3	0.2	0	0	0	0	0	0	1.3	2.7	12.8
Average relative humidity (%)	55	55	53	56	57	58	73	77	73	67	62	55	62
Mean monthly sunshine hours	118.0	129.1	164.9	198.6	209.7	190.1	165.0	161.8	146.7	141.8	131.3	129.1	1,886.1
Percentage possible sunshine	38	41	44	50	48	44	38	39	40	41	43	42	42
Source: China Meteorological Administration
