= List of The Generals of the Yang Family characters =

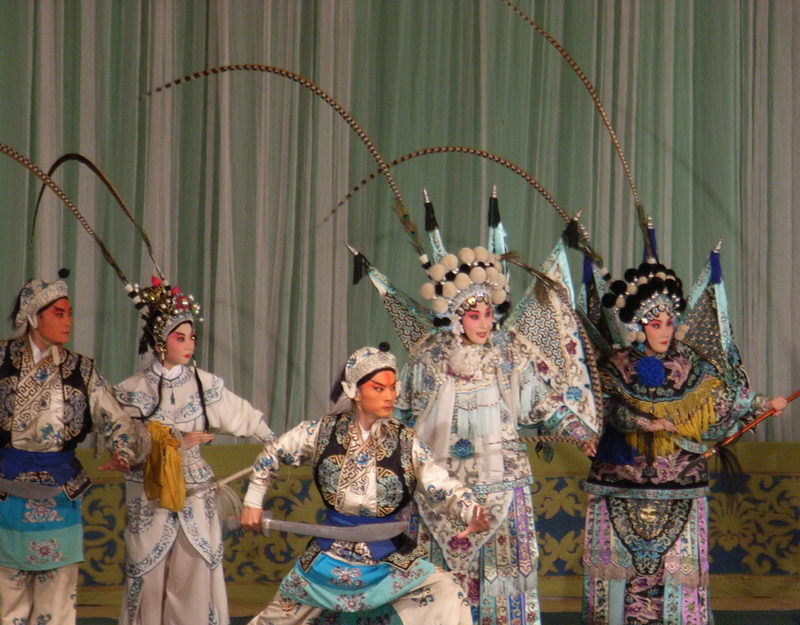
A 2007 Peking opera performance of a Generals of the Yang Family story.

This is a list of The Generals of the Yang Family characters. While some characters are historical, their stories have been fictionalized. Due to the existence of multiple versions (novels, regional Chinese opera, pingshu and screen adaptations) of the saga, some fictional characters are either omitted completely or take on a different name in a given version.

== The Yang family ==
Yang Ye | She Saihua
Yang Yanping; 1st son | Yang Yanding; 2nd son | Yang Yan'an; 3rd son | Yang Yanhui; 4th son | Yang Yande; 5th son | Yang Yanzhao; 6th son | Yang Yansi; 7th son | Yang Yanqi; 8th child | Yang Yanying; 9th child
Zhou Yunjing | Geng Jinhua | Dong Yue'e | Meng Jinbang | Ma Saiying | Du Jin'e
Yelü Qiong'e | Chai Wenyi
Yang Zongyuan | Mu Guiying | Yang Zongbao | Yang Qiuju | Yang Qiulan | Yang Zongying
Yang Wenguang | Yang Jinhua

| Name | Names in other versions | Nicknames | Notes |
First generation
| Yang Ye (楊業) a.k.a. Yang Jiye (楊繼業) | | "Commander Lord" (令公; "Lìnggōng") "Invincible Yang" (楊無敵) | historical |
| She Saihua (佘賽花) | | "Grand Dame" (太君; "Tàijūn") | |
Second generation
| Yang Yanping (楊延平) | Yang Tai (楊泰); Yang Yuanping (楊淵平) | "Eldest son" (大郎; "Dàláng") "First son" (一郎; "Yīláng") | based on Yang Yanyu (楊延玉) |
| Yang Yanding (楊延定) | Yang Zheng (楊正); Yang Yanguang (楊延廣) | "Second son" (二郎; "Èrláng") | based on Yang Yanpu (楊延浦) |
| Yang Yan'an (楊延安) | Yang Gao (楊高); Yang Yanqing (楊延慶) | "Third son" (三郎; "Sānláng") | based on Yang Yanxun (楊延訓) |
| Yang Yanhui (楊延輝); Pseudonym: Mu Yi (木易) | Yang Gui (楊貴); Yang Yanlang (楊延朗) | "Fourth son" (四郎; "Sìláng") | based on Yang Yanhuan (楊延環) |
| Yang Yande (楊延德); Dharma name: Dade (大德) | Yang Chun (楊春) | "Fifth son" (五郎; "Wǔláng") | based on Yang Yangui (楊延貴) |
| Yang Yanzhao (楊延昭) | Yang Jing (楊景) | "Sixth son" (六郎; "Liùláng"); Prince consort (郡馬; "Jùnmǎ") | historical |
| Yang Yansi (楊延嗣) | Yang Xi (楊希); Yang Yanci (楊延慈) | "Seventh son" (七郎; "Qīláng") | based on Yang Yanbin (楊延彬) also based on Yang Si (楊嗣) |
| Yang Yanqi (楊延琪) | Yang Ruofeng (楊若風) | "Eighth sister" (八妹; "Bāmèi") | |
| Yang Yanying (楊延瑛) | | "Ninth sister" (九妹; "Jiǔmèi") | |
| | | "Eldest lady" (大娘; "Dàniáng") | |
| | | "Second lady" (二娘; "Èrniáng") | |
| | | "Third lady" (三娘; "Sānniáng") | |
| | | "Fourth lady" (四娘; "Sìniáng") | |
| | | "Fifth lady" (五娘; "Wǔniáng") | |
| Chai Wenyi (柴文意) | Chai Meirong (柴美容); Chai Qingyun (柴清雲) | Princess (郡主; "Jùnzhǔ") "Sixth lady" (六娘; "Liùniáng") | |
Princess Chai was a descendant (most likely a daughter) of Chai Rong, the second emperor of the Later Zhou who ruled from 954 until his death in 959. In 960, Later Zhou general Zhao Kuangyin (the future Emperor Taizu of Song) was "forced" by his subordinates to seize power from Chai Rong's 6-year-old successor to establish the Song dynasty. According to popular legends, Chai had been a sworn brother of Zhao and entrusted his young son to Zhao at his deathbed. After the usurpation, Zhao felt guilty for betraying Chai, so he treated the Chai family well. All of the Chais were given iron certificates which in red ink specified that they would be exempt from death penalties. Princess Chai grew up in the imperial palace with the House of Zhao children like Zhao Defang, who considered her a younger sister. She later married Yang Yanzhao.
| Du Jin'e (杜金娥) | Du Yu'e (杜玉娥) | "Seventh lady" (七娘; "Qīniáng") | |
| Yelü Qiong'e (耶律瓊娥) | Yelü Ping (耶律萍) | Liao Princess (遼國公主) | |
| Yang Yanshun (楊延順); Birth name: Wang Ying (王英) | Yang Shun (楊順) | "Eighth son" (八郎; "Bāláng") | |
Third generation
| Yang Zongyuan (楊宗源) | | | |
| Yang Zongbao (楊宗保) | | | |
| Mu Guiying (穆桂英) | | | |
| Yang Qiulan (楊秋蘭) | Yang Qijie (楊七姐) | | |
| Yang Qiuju (楊秋菊) | | | |
| Yang Zongying (楊宗英) | | | |
Fourth generation
| Yang Wenguang (楊文廣) | | | historical |
| Yang Jinhua (楊金花) | Yang Xuanniang (楊宣娘) | | |

Yang Wenguang's son is generally known as Yang Huaiyu (楊懷玉) in sequels.

== Historical supporting characters ==
As Generals of the Yang Family is a historical saga, many of the supporting characters are historical characters. The ones that frequently reappear in adaptations include Emperor Taizong of Song, Kou Zhun, Huyan Zan and Zhao Defang of the Song dynasty, and Empress Xiao Yanyan of the Liao dynasty.

=== Song dynasty ===
- Emperor Taizu or Zhao Kuangyin (趙匡胤), 1st emperor, reigning from 960 to 976
- Emperor Taizong or Zhao Guangyi (趙光義), 2nd emperor, reigning from 976 to 997
- Emperor Zhenzong or Zhao Heng (趙恆), 3rd emperor, reigning from 997 to 1022
- Emperor Renzong or Zhao Zhen (趙禎), 4th emperor, reigning from 1022 to 1063

others

- Bao Zheng (包拯)
- Dang Jin (黨進)
- Di Qing (狄青)
- Fan Zhongyan (范仲淹)
- Gao Huaide (高懷德)
- He Huaipu (賀懷浦)
- Huyan Zan (呼延贊)
- Kou Zhun (寇準)
- Lu Duoxun (盧多遜)
- Lü Mengzheng (呂蒙正)
- Wang Gui (王貴)
- Wang Shen (王侁)
- Yang Guangmei (楊光美)
- Zhang Qixian (張齊賢)
- Zhao Defang (趙德芳)
- Zhao Dezhao (趙德昭)
- Zhao Pu (趙普)

=== Liao dynasty ===
- Emperor Jingzong,
- Empress Xiao Yanyan
- Emperor Shengzong,

Others

- Xiao Chuoli
- Xiao Talin
- Yelü Boguzhe
- Yelü Sha
- Yelü Xidi
- Yelü Xiezhen
- Yelü Xiuge
- Yelü Xuegu

== Fictional supporting characters ==
=== Mythological characters ===
- Jade Emperor
- Lü Dongbin
- Zhongli Quan

=== Others ===
Female characters are in pink.

| Name | Names in other versions | Nicknames | Notes |
|---|---|---|---|
| Han Chang (韓昌) | Han Yanshou (韓延壽) | | |
| Huyan Pixian (呼延丕顯) | | | based on Huyan Bixian (呼延必顯) |
| Jiao Tinggui (焦廷貴) | | | |
| Jiao Zan (焦贊) | Jiao Guangzan (焦光贊) | | |
| Lang Qian (郎千) | | | |
| Lang Wan (郎萬) | | | |
| Liu Lihua (劉麗華) | | | |
| Meng Dingguo (孟定國) | Meng Huaiyuan (孟懷遠) | | |
| Meng Liang (孟良) | | | |
| Mu Gua (穆瓜) | | | |
| Mu Tie (穆鐵) | | | |
| Mu Tong (穆銅) | | | |
| Mu Yu (穆羽) | Mu Hongju (穆洪舉) | | |
| Pan Bao (潘豹) | | | |
| Pan Hu (潘虎) | | | |
| Pan Long (潘龍) | | | |
| Pan Renmei (潘仁美) | Pan Hong (潘洪) | | based on Pan Mei |
| Pan Yurong (潘玉蓉) | Pan Ying (潘影) | Imperial consort (皇妃) | based on Princess Pan |
| Ren Tanghui (任堂惠) | | | |
| Wang Lijun (王麗君) | | Imperial consort (皇妃) | |
| Tujinxiu (土金秀) | | | |
| Wang Qin (王欽); Real name: Helü'er (賀驢兒) | Wang Qiang (王強); Wang Ruoqin (王若欽) | | based on Wang Qinruo |
| Xiao Tianyou (蕭天右) | | | |
| Xiao Tianzuo (蕭天左) | | | |
| Xie Jinwu (謝金吾) | | | |
Xie Jinwu was a son-in-law of Wang Qin.
| Yang An (楊安) | | | |
| Yang Hong (楊洪) | | | |
| Yang Paifeng (楊排風) | | | |
| Yelü Shang (耶律尚) | | Prince of Tianqing (天慶王) of Liao | based on Emperor Jingzong of Liao |
| Yue Sheng (岳勝) | | "Flower-faced Beast" (花面獸) | |
