= The Yang's Saga =

1985 Hong Kong miniseries

- Hong Kong DVD cover (from left to right: Michael Miu, Andy Lau, Tony Leung, Felix Wong)
- 楊家將
- Genre: Historical drama; Action; Fantasy
- Based on: The Generals of the Yang Family
- Written by: Peter Pang
- Directed by: Johnnie To; Raymond Lee; Siu Kin-hing
- Starring: Andy Lau; Tony Leung; Michael Miu; Chow Yun-fat; Felix Wong; Kent Tong; Francis Ng; Ha Yu; Alex Man; Ng Man-tat; Kenneth Tsang; Michael Tao; Paul Chun; Maggie Cheung; Carina Lau; Liza Wang; Carol Cheng; Angie Chiu; Jaime Chik; Kathy Chow; Margie Tsang; Teresa Mo; Sharon Yeung; Mimi Kung; Kiki Sheung
- Opening theme: "The Courageous Are Invincible" (勇者無敵) by Leslie Cheung
- Composer: Joseph Koo
- Country of origin: Hong Kong
- Original language: Cantonese
- No. of episodes: 6

Production
- Executive producer: Lee Tim-shing
- Production location: Hong Kong
- Camera setup: Multi camera
- Running time: ≈30 minutes per episode (first 5 episodes); ≈3 hours (last episode)
- Production company: TVB

Original release
- Network: TVB Jade
- Release: 21 October – 26 October 1985

The Yang's Saga (楊家將) is a 1985 Hong Kong historical fantasy action miniseries based on stories from The Generals of the Yang Family collection and incorporating elements of Chinese mythology. Produced by TVB, the miniseries featured the most star-studded cast in Hong Kong television history, among whom were the "Five Tiger Generals of TVB".

The miniseries was shown on TVB Jade from 21 to 26 October 1985 during TVB's anniversary season, temporarily replacing the time slot for Enjoy Yourself Tonight. The first five episodes were about 30 minutes long each, while the last episode was about three hours long.

== Production ==
TVB had mobilised the entire station to make the miniseries within two weeks in October 1985 in order to compete with ATV for viewership as ATV was sending its Miss Asia Pageant winner Eva Lai to represent Hong Kong in the Miss Asia Pacific International held at Queen Elizabeth Stadium in Wan Chai on 26 October 1985.

== Synopsis ==
The series is set in late 10th-century China. Zhao Guangyi murders his brother Zhao Kuangyin, the Song Empire's founding emperor, and seizes the throne. In heaven, the Jade Emperor decides to punish Zhao Guangyi by sending the Red-Whiskered Dragon (reincarnated as the Liao Empire's Empress Dowager Xiao) to destroy the Song Empire. The Jade Emperor later changes his mind and sends three immortals – reincarnated as Yang Ye, Bao Zheng and Kou Zhun – to help the Song Empire. Around the same time, the immortals Leizhenzi and Tianhuangnü are banished from heaven for falling in love with each other, and reincarnated as Yang Ye's seventh son Yang Yansi and Yang Yansi's wife Du Jin'e respectively.

In the human world, Yang Ye marries She Saihua and has nine children (seven sons and two daughters) with her. Their sons also meet and marry their respective wives. Within the Song Empire, a rivalry brews between the Yangs and the Pan family, whose patriarch Pan Hong is also a reincarnated immortal holding a grudge against Yang Ye. When Zhao Guangyi sends the Yangs to lead Song forces into battle against Liao invaders, the Pans are ordered to lead Song reinforcements to support the Yangs. However, Pan Hong secretly conspires with the Liao forces to get rid of the Yangs, deliberately refraining from sending the reinforcements in time. As a result, Yang Ye and three of his sons are killed in battle, while Yang Yansi manages to escape and seek help from Pan Hong. Pan Hong, who hates Yang Yansi for unintentionally killing his son earlier, uses the chance to arrest and execute Yang Yansi. The fourth son Yang Yanhui is captured by the enemy but later marries the Liao princess Qinglian, while the fifth son Yang Yande is saved and becomes a monk at Mount Wutai.

Yang Ye's sixth son Yang Yanzhao survives and accuses Pan Hong of treason. Pan Hong is relieved of his command and placed under arrest, while his two sons defect to the Liao Empire. Pan Hong's daughter Consort Pan, who is Zhao Guangyi's concubine, convinces the emperor not to appoint Bao Zheng as the judge in her father's trial as Bao is known for being close to the Yangs. Kou Zhun, who is then put in charge of the trial, uncovers evidence of Pan Hong's treachery and Pan Hong is sentenced to exile. Yang Yanzhao reunites with his lost fifth brother and they work together to kill Pan Hong and his sons, thus avenging their father and fallen brothers.

Meanwhile, Liao forces launch an invasion, forcing Zhao Guangyi to pardon Yang Yanzhao for killing Pan Hong and put Yang Yanzhao in charge of leading Song forces to resist the invaders. In heaven, Lü Dongbin and Zhongli Quan of the Eight Immortals have a competition over the outcome of the Song–Liao battle. On one hand, Lü Dongbin helps the Liao forces deploy the Heaven's Gate Formation, trapping Yang Yanzhao. On the other hand, She Saihua, along with her other surviving sons and the women of the Yang family, receives guidance from Zhongli Quan on how to break the formation and save Yang Yanzhao. The battle concludes with a Song victory. Yang Yanhui is reunited with his family but feels guilty after seeing Qinglian die in battle, so he leaves for good. Yang Yande, having fought alongside his family one last time, decides to continue his new life as a monk. Despite her achievement, She Saihua declines rewards from Zhao Guangyi and chooses to retire and lead a peaceful life.

== Cast ==
- Yeung Chak-lam as Yang Ye
- Sheung Yee as She Saihua
- Newton Lai as Yang Yanping (Yang Dalang)
- Susanna Au-yeung as Zhang Jinding (Yang Daniang)
- Francis Ng as Yang Yanding (Yang Erlang)
- Kiki Sheung as Yun Cuiying (Yang Erniang)
- Lee Kwok-lun as Yang Yan'an (Yang Sanlang)
- Teresa Mo as Luo Sumei (Yang Sanniang)
- Michael Miu as Yang Yanhui (Yang Silang)
- Mimi Kung as Lady Luo (Yang Siniang)
- Felix Wong as Yang Yande (Yang Wulang)
- Shallin Tse as Mai Saiying (Yang Wuniang)
- Andy Lau as Yang Yanzhao (Yang Liulang)
- Carina Lau as Princess Chai (Yang Liuniang)
- Tony Leung as Yang Yansi (Yang Qilang)
- Margie Tsang as Du Jin'e (Yang Qiniang)
- Sharon Yeung as Yang Yanqi (Yang Bamei)
- Kathy Chow as Yang Yanying (Yang Jiumei)
- Chun Wong as Meng Liang
- Chan Wing-chun as Jiao Zan
- Lee Heung-kam as Du Daniang
- Lau Siu-ming as Pan Hong
- So Hang-suen as Lady Pan
- Felix Lok as Pan Long
- Michael Tao as Pan Hu
- Poon Wang-pan as Pan Bao
- Lam Lap-sam as Zhao Kuangyin (Emperor Taizu)
- Lee Lung-kei as Zhang Guangyi (Emperor Taizong)
- Lui Yau-wai as Empress Mingde
- Patricia Chong as Consort Pan
- Kent Tong as Zhao Defang
- Lo Hoi-pang as Bao Zheng
- Ha Yu as Kou Zhun
- Ho Kwai-lam as Eunuch Cui
- Lau Dan as Huyan Zan
- Liu Kai-chi as Huyan Pixian
- Maggie Li as Empress Dowager Xiao
- Lau Kong as Yelü Xian (Emperor Jingzong)
- Jaime Chik as Princess Qinglian
- Joan Tong as Princess Bilian
- Kwok Fung as Xiao Tianzuo
- Benz Hui as Xiao Tianyou
- Stephan Yip as Yelü Xidi
- Kenneth Tsang as the Jade Emperor
- Liza Wang as the Goddess of Mount Hua
- Angie Chiu as Guanyin
- Maggie Cheung as the Jiutian Xuannü
- Lee Shu-kwai as Golden Boy
- Maggie Siu as Jade Girl
- Tam Chuen-hing as Erlang Shen
- Wong Wun-choi as Guiguzi
- Ng Man-tat as the Monk from Mount Wutai
- Alex Man as Han Xiangzi
- Chow Yun-fat as Lü Dongbin
- Carol Cheng as He Xiangu
- Tam Bing-man as Zhongli Quan
- Pau Fong as Zhang Guolao
- Chan Fuk-sang as Lan Caihe
- Cheung Ying-choi as Cao Guojiu
- Chu Tit-wo as Li Tieguai
