= The Eight Diagram Pole Fighter =

1984 Hong Kong film by Lau Kar-leung

- The Hong Kong movie poster.

Chinese name
- Traditional Chinese: 五郎八卦棍
- Simplified Chinese: 五郎八卦棍
Transcriptions
Standard Mandarin
- Hanyu Pinyin: Wǔláng Bāguà Gùn
Yue: Cantonese
- Jyutping: Ng^{5}long^{4} Baat^{3}gwaa^{3} Gwan^{3}
- Directed by: Lau Kar-leung
- Written by: Lau Kar-leung; Ni Kuang
- Produced by: Mona Fong; Run Me Shaw; Run Run Shaw
- Starring: Gordon Liu; Alexander Fu; Kara Hui; Ko Fei
- Cinematography: Cho On-Sun
- Edited by: Chiang Hsing-Lung; Lee Yim-Hoi
- Music by: Stephen Shing
- Distributed by: Shaw Brothers Studio
- Release date: 17 February 1984 (Hong Kong)
- Running time: 98 minutes
- Country: Hong Kong
- Language: Cantonese

The Eight Diagram Pole Fighter is a 1984 Hong Kong film by Shaw Brothers, directed by Lau Kar-leung and starring Gordon Liu, Kara Hui and Alexander Fu (in his final film appearance). It was released as The Invincible Pole Fighters outside of Hong Kong and Invincible Pole Fighter in North America.

Alexander Fu died in a car accident before the filming of The Eight Diagram Pole Fighter was finished. The script was partly re-written after his death and Fu's character does not appear in the final showdown as originally written in the script.

The film is based on the Generals of the Yang Family (Yeung family in Cantonese) legends.

== Plot ==
With help from the treacherous Song dynasty general Pun Mei, the Khitan-ruled Liao dynasty army succeeds in trapping the loyal Song general Yeung Yip and his seven sons at Golden Beach. Yeung Yip and his sons are all killed or captured in the ambush, except for the 5th son and the 6th son, who manage to escape. The 6th son returns home, but is severely traumatised by the events, resulting in tantrums. Meanwhile, the 5th son seeks refuge in a monastery in Mount Wutai, but the monastery leaders initially do not consider him calm enough to be a Buddhist monk. As blades are not allowed inside a monastery, he uses his training in spears to practise with a pole, eventually developing the unique eight diagram pole fighting technique. When he finally appears to have put his anger and past behind him, news breaks that the Khitans have captured his younger sister, Yeung Baat-mui, who has been looking for him. Now he must break his Buddhist vows, which include not killing any living being and not being bothered by worldly affairs, to save Baat-mui and exact his revenge.

== Cast ==
Note: The characters' names are in Cantonese romanisation.

Cast	Role	Description
Lily Li	Se Choi-fa	"Taai-gwan", Yeung Yip's wife
Wong Yue	Yeung Ping	"Daai-long", Yeung Yip's 1st son
Lau Kar-wing	Yeung Ding	"Yi-long", Yeung Yip's 2nd son
Mak Tak-law	Yeung On	"Saam-long", Yeung Yip's 3rd son
Hsiao Ho	Yeung Fai	"Sei-long", Yeung Yip's 4th son
Gordon Liu	Yeung Dak	"Ng-long", Yeung Yip's 5th son
Alexander Fu	Yeung Chiu	"Luk-long", Yeung Yip's 6th son
David Cheung Chin-pang	Yeung Zi	"Chat-long", Yeung Yip's 7th son
Kara Hui	Yeung Kei	"Baat-mui", Yeung Yip's daughter and 8th child
Yeung Jing-jing	Yeung Ying	"Gau-mui", Yeung Yip's daughter and 9th child
Lam Hak-ming	Pun Mei	Song dynasty general
Wang Lung-wei	Ye-leut Lin	Liao dynasty prince
Chu Tiet-woh	Gun Kwai	Liao dynasty general
Ko Fei		abbot of the Ching-leung Monastery
Ching Chu	Master Ji-hung	senior monk at the Ching-leung Monastery
Yuen Tak		Yang Loyalist with the golden blade
Lau Kar-leung		hunter

== Production ==
Actors Alexander Fu Sheng, his younger brother David Cheung Chin-pang and Wong Yue were involved in an automobile accident in which Fu Sheng died. At the time of his death, he had not finished filming his role, after which the director rewrote Fu's parts for Kara Wai's 8th child character.

== Awards and nominations ==
1985 – 4th Hong Kong Film Awards

- Nominated – Lau Kar-leung, Best Action Choreography
