= Saving General Yang =

2013 Hong Kong film by Ronny Yu

- Official poster
- Traditional Chinese: 忠烈楊家將
- Simplified Chinese: 忠烈杨家将
- Hanyu Pinyin: Zhōng Liè Yáng Jiā Jiàng
- Jyutping: Zung^{1} Lit^{6} Joeng^{4} Gaa^{1} Zoeng^{3}
- Directed by: Ronny Yu
- Written by: Edmond Wong; Liu Shijia; Ronny Yu
- Produced by: Raymond Wong
- Starring: Adam Cheng; Ekin Cheng; Yu Bo; Vic Zhou; Li Chen; Raymond Lam; Wu Chun; Fu Xinbo
- Cinematography: Chan Chi-ying
- Edited by: Drew Thompson
- Music by: Kenji Kawai
- Production companies: Pegasus Motion Pictures; Pegasus Film & TV Culture (Beijing); Huayi Brothers; Henan Film & TV Production Group; Henan Film Studio
- Distributed by: Pegasus Motion Pictures Distribution Limited
- Release date: 4 April 2013
- Running time: 102 minutes
- Country: Hong Kong
- Languages: Mandarin; Cantonese
- Box office: HK$6.3 million

Saving General Yang is a 2013 Hong Kong film directed by Ronny Yu. The story is based on the legendary Generals of the Yang Family. The film was selected as part of the 2013 Hong Kong International Film Festival.

== Plot ==
The film is set in the early Northern Song dynasty, AD 986, of northeastern China. Former Northern Han general and the patriarch of the Yang clan Yang Ye pledges allegiance to the new Han Chinese-ruled Song regime after Northern Han's fall. Years later Yang's seventh son, Yang Yansi, participated in a martial arts tournament with his father's rival Pan Renmei's son Pan Bao in his sixth brother Yang Yanzhao's place to win Later Zhou's former princess Chai Meirong's (who is Yang Yanzhao's childhood sweetheart) hand in marriage, which ended in the latter's death. The following morning Yang and Pan meet with the emperor about the issue; Yang executes 30 whiplashes to his young sons as punishment. Later, Song's border stations are burned, signaling an invasion from the Khitan-ruled Liao regime.

The Khitan army hopes to take its revenge on the Yang Clan and their followers for a past defeat that killed a Khitan general ten years previously. It was noted that the leader of the invading Khitan army is Yelü Yuan, son of the deceased Khitan general. Due to politics and Pan Bao's death, Pan Renmei is awarded with 50,000 troops to repel the Khitan army. As punishment, Gen. Yang is given a lesser task—to lead the charge and be the scout. When the two armies meet, Pan Renmei's lack of experience and inept leadership causes chaos among the Song army, and the Khitan forces emerge with a decisive victory. All the while Gen. Yang is trapped behind enemy lines in an abandoned town in front of Wolf Mountain. The Khitan army surrounds the town, allowing no one to leave. Pan, however, refuses to send troops to rescue Yang as revenge. This leaves Yang Ye's wife, She Saihua, devastated as she sends her seven sons to rescue him. It is later revealed that this is exactly what Yelü Yuan wanted, and the sons fall into his deadly trap.

Led by the eldest son, Yang Yanping, the seven brothers—including the two youngest, who unlike their brothers have never seen combat—set out with a small band of Yang Clan's elite soldiers to fight through an army of thousands to reach to the Wolf Mountain. When they finally arrive in the town, the Khitan army starts bombarding it with catapults and unleashes a fierce attack. The seven escape with their father, but are the only ones of the clan to survive; all the soldiers with them are killed. In the escape the father is wounded with a poisoned arrow (actually wounded in the previous battle). and he ultimately kills himself. The sons decide to bring their father's body home for a proper burial and to allow their mother to see her beloved husband one last time.

Before sending off the seven sons, She Saihua visits a fortune teller, who gives her a slip of paper saying: "Seven will set off, six will return". By the end of the film, Yang Yansi dies after Pan's archers fill him full of arrows under his orders after he escaped from Wolf Mountain, and Yelü Yuan personally hunts Yang Ye's surviving sons and kills five of them. However, Yang Yanzhao alone defeats and kills Yelü in combat, seemingly proving the prediction wrong. It turns out, though, that the message was correct; what it actually meant was that Yang Yanzhao, who was son #6, was the one who would return and have a greater destiny than his siblings. He returned with his father's body, the brothers' weapons and Yelü Yuan's severed head. Although four of Yang Ye's sons' bodies were recovered, two had never been found. After his father's and brothers' funerals, Yang Yanzhao marries Chai Meirong. His victory over Yelü Yuan redeemed his father's failure to stop the Khitan army, and the Khitan empress had to halt her assault on the Song empire due to the loss of her general. Because of the sons' courageous actions, Yang Yanzhao rises to his late father's position as general and the Yang Clan developed a legendary reputation in China.

== Cast ==
- Adam Cheng as Yang Ye - Gen. Yang
- Xu Fan as She Saihua - Gen. Yang's wife and mother of their children
- Ekin Cheng as Yang Yanping - Yang's first son
- Yu Bo as Yang Yanding - Yang's second son
- Vic Chou as Yang Yan'an - Yang's third son
- Li Chen as Yang Yanhui - Yang's fourth son
- Raymond Lam as Yang Yande - Yang's fifth son
- Wu Chun as Yang Yanzhao - Yang's sixth son
- Fu Xinbo as Yang Yansi - Yang's seventh son
- Ady An as Chai Meirong - Later Zhou kingdom's former princess
- Shao Bing as Yelü Yuan - Liao regime's general
- Bryan Leung as Pan Renmei
- Chen Zhihui as Huyan Zan
- Li Qian as Yang Paifeng
