= Warriors of the Yang Clan =

2004 Chinese television series

- DVD cover
- 杨门虎将
- Genre: Costume drama; Wuxia
- Based on: The Generals of the Yang Family
- Written by: Zhu Li; Ren Sha; Ruan Xiaona
- Directed by: Leung Tak-wah; Liu Feng; Wang Ming
- Starring: Alec Su; Chae Rim; Angie Chiu; Ti Lung; Kou Zhenhai; Hu Jing; Yan Kun; Wang Yan; Bao Jianfeng
- Opening theme: "Sunset on Golden Beach" (日落金沙滩) by Zhou Xiao'ou
- Ending theme: "Dull Ache" (隐隐作痛) by Sun Yue
- Composer: Xiao Zhe
- Country of origin: China
- Original language: Mandarin
- No. of episodes: 33

Production
- Producers: Li Mi; Hao Hsiao-tsu
- Running time: ≈45 minutes per episode
- Production companies: Beijing Tianzhong Yinghua Media; Zhejiang Huaxin Film & Television

Original release
- Release: 2004

Warriors of the Yang Clan (杨门虎将) is a 2004 Chinese costume drama television series based on stories in The Generals of the Yang Family collection, starring cast members from mainland China, Taiwan and Hong Kong.

== Synopsis ==
Though full of ideas and passion, Yang Yanhui, the fourth son of the Song general Yang Ye, never seemed capable to satisfy his father. After a serendipitous encounter, he fell deeply in love with Pan Yuyan, the daughter of the chancellor Pan Renmei. At the border between the Song and Liao empires, he saved the Liao princess Mingji twice, which initiated her obsession with him.

Meanwhile, Yang Ye's seventh son Yang Yansi helped his third brother Yang Yanqing propose to the housemaid and their best friend Yang Chuchu, until finally realising that her love was himself. Right before her wedding, Yang Chuchu was raped by Pan Yuyan's brother Pan Bao and committed suicide, and Pan Bao died in the ensuring brawl with the Yang brothers.

Yang Yanqing and Yang Yanhui were attacked by Pan Renmei's assassins in jail and had to flee. Yang Yanqing finally found love with the pure-hearted bandit Mao Xiaoying. Back home, Yang Ye's sixth son Yang Yanzhao's romance with childhood friend Princess Chai blossomed.

Yiyun, a Liao spy, succeeded in putting the Yangs in great danger, but eventually sacrificed her own life to save the family and Yang Ye's fifth son Yang Yande, whom she developed feelings for. To be with Yang Yanhui, Pan Yuyan parted ways with her vengeful father, who had plotted with the Liao army to lure Yang Ye and the Song emperor into a trap.

While the Song emperor escaped from the ambush at Golden Beach, Yang Ye and many of his sons died tragically one after another. Captured alive, Yang Yanhui was presented with a choice: die a hero like his father and brothers, or become a despicable traitor and marry Princess Mingji whom he did not love - the only option if he wanted to return home and unite with his family again.

== Cast ==
- Alec Su as Yang Yanhui (Yang Silang)
- Chae Rim as Pan Yuyan
- Ti Lung as Yang Ye
- Angie Chiu as She Saihua
- Lin Jiangguo as Yang Yanping (Yang Dalang)
- Wu Jingqi as Yang Daniang
- Zhang Zichen as Yang Yanguang (Yang Erlang)
- Qiao Feifei as Yang Erniang
- Yu Xiaowei as Yang Yanqing (Yang Sanlang)
- Wang Yan as Mao Xiaoying
- Bao Jianfeng as Yang Yande
- Jia Nailiang as Yang Yanzhao
- Niu Mengmeng as Princess Chai
- Yan Kun as Yang Yansi
- Hu Jing as Princess Mingji
- Kou Zhenhai as Pan Renmei
- Jiang Hong as Yiyun
- Zhang Yi as Yang Chuchu
- Zhao Qiang as Pan Bao
- Zhao Shuai as Kou Zhun
- Yang Chao as Crown Prince Mingde
- Wang Ying as Consort Pan
- Zhu Xingqiang as Yang Hong
- Qin Chuan as the Liao emperor
- Zhou Fang as Cui'er
- Shen Fu as Zhao Defang
- Xu Shouyin as Master Zhiguang
- Che Dong as Zhang Kun
- Fang Zhoubo as Emperor Taizong
- Wang Shiwen as Prince Chai
- Zhou Mujie as Chai Bufan

== Soundtrack ==
Warriors of the Yang Clan Original Television Soundtrack

Soundtrack album by Xiao Zhe (composer) & various artists
- Genre: Soundtrack
- Length: 55:17
- Label: NMG Entertainment

=== Track list ===
1. "Intro" (引子) [1:14]
2. "Sunset at Golden Beach" (日落金沙滩) by Zhou Xiao'ou [4:21]
3. "Dawn" (清晨) [0:44]
4. "Encounter" (遇见) [2:08]
5. "Competition" (比武) [1:07]
6. "Love Already" (爱了) [4:26]
7. "Chase at the Market" (集市中的追逐) [1:06]
8. "Letter from Him" (他的来信) [1:22]
9. "Paradise" (天伦之乐) [2:55]
10. "Return My Jade Pendant" (还我玉佩) [1:34]
11. "Anticipation under the Afterglow" (夕阳中的期盼) [1:11]
12. "Darkness is Coming" (黑暗即将来临) [2:21]
13. "Farewell, My Love" (再见,我的爱人) [3:24]
14. "Foreigner's Blade" (异族的尖刀) [1:41]
15. "Set Off" (出征) [3:25]
16. "Black Horse" (黑色戏马) [1:42]
17. "Futile Love" (没有结果的爱情) [5:14]
18. "Bone Fighting" (骨战) [1:15]
19. "Wasteland" (荒原) [1:45]
20. "You Can Misunderstand" (你可以不懂) by Alec Su [3:57]
21. "My Blood" (我的血液) [4:32]
22. "Obtuse Pain" (隐隐作痛) by Sun Yue [3:53]
