= Bao Jianfeng =

- 保剑锋
- Born: November 3, 1975 (age 50); Shanghai, China
- Other name: Jeff Bao
- Education: East China Model High School; Shanghai Theatre Academy
- Occupations: Actor, singer
- Years active: 1998–present
- Spouse: He Jiahao (m. 2009)
- Children: 1
- Musical career
- Genres: Mandopop
- Label: Huayi Brothers

Chinese name
- Simplified Chinese: 保剑锋
- Traditional Chinese: 保劍鋒
Transcriptions
Standard Mandarin
- Hanyu Pinyin: Bǎo Jiànfēng

Bao Jianfeng (Chinese: 保剑锋; born November 3, 1975) is a Chinese actor and singer of Mongolian descent, best known in film for portraying Mao Zedong in The Road of Exploring (2011), Lü Bu in The Assassins (2012) and Chen Shuxiang in The Bloody of Xiangjiang River, and has received critical acclaim for his television work, particularly as Gu Yuetao in The Shining Teenagers (2002), Gaozong of Tang in Lady Wu: The First Empress (2004), Wei Zheng in The Prince of Qin, Li Shimin (2005), Xue Rengui in The Legend of Xue Rengui (2006), Chu Lian in Dreams Link, and Di Xin in Zhaoge.

== Biography ==
=== Early life ===
Bao Jianfeng was born into a military family on November 3, 1975. He attended the East China Model High School. After completing his education in Shanghai Theatre Academy, he was assigned to Shanghai Dramatic Arts Center.

=== Acting career ===
Bao Jianfeng's first screen acting credit was Zhenkong Aiqing Jilu and subsequently appearing on television series such as Pearl Tower (1998), The 28 Nannies of Professor Tian's Family (1998), Love and Resentment of Two Generations (2000), and Purple File (2001).

Bao Jianfeng's first film role was uncredited appearance in the film A Beautiful New World (1999), a comedy film starring Jiang Wu, Tao Hong, Richie Jen, and Wu Bai.

In 2002, Bao Jianfeng co-starred with Ni Jingyang, Kym and Li Zhinan in the idol drama The Shining Teenagers as Gu Yuetao, the class teacher and Chinese teacher. That same year, he had key supporting role as Liu Bei, a warlord in the late Eastern Han dynasty and the founder of the state of Shu Han in the Three Kingdoms period, in Chen Kaige's Lü Bu and Diao Chan.

In 2003, Bao Jianfeng starred as Emperor Gaozong of Tang, reuniting him with co-star Jia Jingwen, who played Wu Zetian, in the historical romantic television series Lady Wu: The First Empress. It was a hot TV series in mainland China in that year.

In 2004, Bao Jianfeng starred in a historical television series called The Prince of Qin, Li Shimin with Peter Ho, Gao Yuanyuan, Kevin Yan, and Jia Jingwen. At the same year, he also played the Kangxi Emperor, the lead role in Huayi Brothers's Qingtian Yamen, costarring Zhong Fuxiang and Xu Yun.

In 2005, Bao Jianfeng starred as Xue Rengui in The Legend of Xue Rengui, alongside Jin Qiaoqiao, Ashton Chen, Li Xiaoran, and Zhang Tielin. He also played the character Yang Yande in Warriors of the Yang Clan, opposite Ti Lung and Angie Chiu.

In 2006, Bao Jianfeng appeared in Super Boy and Girl, a romantic television series starring Hu Bing, Ady An, Victor Huang, and Fu Miao.

In 2007, Bao Jianfeng was cast in the film Detection of Knight-errant： the Scholar's Death, opposite Gu Zhixin, Cherrie Ying and Fu Heng. That same year, he starred opposite Alex Fong, Zhang Jiani, and Qin Lan in Dreams Link, adapted from Taiwanese novelist Chiung Yao's romantic novel Fantasies Behind the Pearly Curtain.

In 2008, Bao Jianfeng was cast in Nühai Chongchongchong, a comedy television series starring Jing Boran, Yang Zi, and Huang Shengyi.

In 2011, Bao Jianfeng co-starred with Zhou Dongyu, Qian Feng and Tao Shuai in the biographical film The Road of Exploring as Mao Zedong. He also made cameo appearances in Close To Me and The Founding Father Sun Yat-sen. He had a minor role in Romance of Tang′ Kongfu, which starred Alex Fong and Chrissie Chau.

In 2012, he guest starred in the historical drama film The Assassins. That same year, he starred in Good Wife, playing the husband of Liu Tao's character.

In 2013, he starred in the historical television series Hua Xu Yin: City of Desperate Love with Kevin Cheng, Lin Yuan, Yuan Hong, and Jiang Xin.

In 2014, Bao Jianfeng starred opposite Yang Gongru, Zhang Xiwen and Danny Lee in Country Wind and Rain. He co-starred with Liu Tao in Outsmarted His Huashan Legend.

In 2015, he starred with Yan Bingyan in We Will Make It Right. The film won the Best World Movie at the 20th Sedona Film Festival and the Best Small and Medium Cost Feature Film at the 30th Golden Rooster Awards. He had a cameo appearance in Money Game, a comedy film starring Lee Seung-hyun, Zhang Lanxin, Liu Hua, and Zhang Yishan. He also had a minor role as a wealthy merchant in the 3D fantasy action comedy adventure film Monster Hunt, which starred Bai Baihe, Jing Boran and Jiang Wu.

In 2016, it was announced that Bao Jianfeng joined Midnight Diner 2, opposite Yi Yi and Qiao Shan. He also portrayed one of the leads as Di Xin in Zhaoge.

In 2017, he had key supporting role in the war film Battle of Xiangjiang River, created by August First Film Studio. He portrayed Tan Pingshan in Andrew Lau's The Founding of an Army, a historical film released on July 28, 2017 to mark the 90th anniversary of the founding of the People’s Liberation Army.

=== Musical career ===
On April 2, 2008, Bao Jianfeng released his debut album, Heartbreaker.

== Personal life ==
On April 25, 2009, Bao Jianfeng married He Jiahao (Chinese: 何珈好) in Shanghai. Their son was born in 2015.

== Filmography ==
=== Film ===
Year	Title	Chinese title	Role	Notes
1999	A Beautiful New World	美丽新世界	guest	
2007	Detection of Knight-errant： the Scholar's Death	侠侣探案之书生之死	Yuan You'an	
2011	Close To Me	守护童年	The policeman	guest
2011	The Road of Exploring	湘江北去	Mao Zedong	
2011	The First President	第一大总统	The doctor	guest
2012	The Assassins	铜雀台	Lü Bu	
2015	We Will Make It Right	因为谷桂花	Ma Jiancheng	
2015	Money Game	黄金福将	Li Changzai	
2015	Monster Hunt	捉妖记	Zheng Tao	guest
2017	Battle of Xiangjiang River	血战湘江	Chen Shuxiang	
2017	The Founding of an Army	建军大业	Zheng Tao	guest
2019	Once Upon a Time in China			
2019	Exceptionally Gifted Girl			

=== Television series ===
Year	Title	Chinese title	Role	Notes
1996	Zhenkong Aiqing Jilu	真空爱情记录	Xiao Luyu	
1997	Hong Kong People	省港人家	Chen Haibin	
1998	Pearl Tower	珍珠塔新传	Fang Qing	
1998	The 28 Nannies of Professor Tian's Family	田教授家的二十八个保姆	Tian Siwen	
1998	The Son	人子	Luo Tuo	
2000	Love and Resentment of Two Generations	情怨两代人	Wu Xiaozhao	
2000	The Desire	欲望	An Da	
2000	Greatest Wedding on Earth	南北一家亲	Wang Naihai	
2000	Jiu Jie Liang Yuan	酒结良缘	Chen Xiao'er	
2001	Purple File	紫色档案	Tai Zi	
2001	Go Go Fighting	越活越精彩	Ding Yong	
2002	The Angry Butterfly	愤怒的蝴蝶	Jun Er	
2002	The Shining Teenagers	十八岁的天空	Gu Yuetao	
2003		锵锵儿女到江湖	Su Can	
2003	Goodbye To Love	真情告别	Chen Zicong	
2003	Lü Bu and Diao Chan	吕布与貂蝉	Liu Bei	
2004	Lady Wu: The First Empress	至尊红颜	Emperor Gaozong of Tang	
2004	Qingtian Yamen	青天衙门	Kangxi Emperor	
2004	The Voice of Angel	天使的歌声	The doctor	
2005	Tears of the South China Sea	南洋泪	Lu Zizhong	
2005	Cherry Red	殷桃正红	Shi Yifei	
2005	My Way	起跑天堂	Yin Zhenfeng	
2005	The Prince of Qin, Li Shimin	秦王李世民	Wei Zheng	
2005	Warriors of the Yang Clan	杨门虎将	Yang Yande	
2005	The Blind Detective	盲侠金鱼飞天猪	Zhu Zhongxian	
2006		福禄寿三星报喜	Ouyang Xiaotian	
2006	Hero During Yongle Period	永乐英雄儿女	Feng Tianci	
2006	Rent Girlfriend	出租女友	Lin Zhou	
2006	The Legend of Xue Rengui	薛仁贵传奇	Xue Rengui	
2006		女人行	guest	
2006	Love is Love	爱就爱了	Liu Xingdong	
2007	Qingtian Yamen 2	青天衙门2	Kangxi Emperor	
2007	Lost City Snow Home	雪域迷城	Najialuo	
2007	Dreams Link	又见一帘幽梦	Chu Lian	
2007	The Sewing Maid	绣娘兰馨	Guangxu Emperor	
2007	Super Boy and Girl	超级男女	Fang Zheng	
2007	Past Evens in the Small City	小城往事	Bai Jinlai	
2007	Bays of Being Parents	可怜天下父母心	Xia Zulin	
2007	Love with No Regret	爱无悔	Luo Renhao	
2008	Big Pearl	大珍珠	Xia Mulin	
2008	The Blue File	蓝色档案	Zhao Kang	
2009	I'm a Grass	《我是一棵小草	Liu Shui	
2009	Nühai Chongchongchong	女孩冲冲冲	Sun Shangxiang	
2010	When The Cranberries Open	红莓花儿开	Shen Yan	
2010	Luanshi Yuyuan	乱世玉缘	Xia Wenxuan	
2010	Shanliang Beihou	善良背后	Gao Jianjun	
2010	Mystery 1937	迷案1937	Luo Sangtian	
2010	The Good Old Days	再见艳阳天	Fang Hesheng	
2011	Beauty In the South	南国有佳人	Chen Peinan	
2011	Hongwu Big Case	洪武大案	Qin Sheng	
2011	The Perfect Husband	完美丈夫	Zhao Dahai	
2011		那些年那些事	Qiao Yanbao	
2011	Romance of Tang′ Kongfu	唐朝浪漫英雄	Mi Lang	guest
2012	The Final Shot	最后一枪	Chen Ze	
2012	The Phantom	幻影	Zheng Yunfan	
2013	Good Wife	贤妻	Zhao Boxuan	
2013	Longmen Express	龙门镖局	Deng Tingfang	
2013	Hua Xu Yin: City of Desperate Love	华胥引之绝爱之城	Rong Yan	
2014	Special Duties Unit	特警突击队	Cateran	guest
2014	Beautiful Enticement	美丽的诱惑	Lin Yiji	
2014	Country Wind and Rain	江山风雨几多情	Tang Ao	
2014	Legend of the Naga Pearls	鲛珠传	Rong Yuan	
2014	Outsmarted His Huashan Legend	智取华山传奇	Zhao Changsheng	
2014	Forever We are One Family	永远一家人	Qiao Weiping	
2014	Heroes Under Fire	火线英雄	An Jiawei	
2015	Love Me, You Don't Go	爱我，你别走	Wen Hao	
2017	Midnight Diner 2	深夜食堂2		
2017	Zhaoge	朝歌	Di Xin	
2017	New Dragon Gate Inn	新龙门客栈	Cao Shaoqin	
2019	If I Can Love You So	如果可以这样爱	Qi Shuli	
2020	The Coolest World	最酷的世界		
2026	Swords Into Plowshares	太平年	Shuiqiu Zhaoquan	

=== Variety show ===
Year	Title	Chinese title	Role	Notes
2004	Unusual Weekend	非常周末	guest	
2005	The Beauty of Middle School Students	美丽中学生	Jury	
2011	The Generation Show	年代秀	guest	
2014	I'm legend	我是传奇	guest	
2015	Soldiers Sortie	士兵突击之勇者奇兵	guest	
2015	Hello, Newbie	你好，菜鸟	guest	
2015	Fresh Man	一年级·大学季	guest	
2021	China in Classics	典籍里的中国	Duanmu Ci	

== Discography ==
=== Studio album ===
#	Title	Chinese Title	Released	Label	Notes
1st	Heartbreaker	万人迷	2 April 2008	EU ladder	

=== Singles ===
- Flower Season of Sunflower Flower (向日葵的花季)
- We are Much Happier Than the Flowers (我们比花儿幸福得多)

== Awards and nominations ==
Year	Award	Category	Nominated work	Result	Ref.
2020	7th The Actors of China Award Ceremony	Best Actor (Sapphire)	—N/a	Pending	
