= Invincible Yang =

Invincible Yang (楊無敵, Yang Wudi) may refer to:

- Yang Ye (died 986), military general serving the Northern Han and Song dynasties
- Yang Luchan (1799–1872), martial arts master during the Qing dynasty
