= Yelü Sha =

- from one 1892 print of the novel Legends of Generals of the Yang Family (楊家將傳)
- Died: 20 May 988
- Children: Yelü Deli (耶律德裏), son

Yelü Sha (Chinese: 耶律沙), courtesy name Anyin (安隱), of the Yelü clan (died 988) was a Khitan general and statesman in imperial China's Liao dynasty.

He rose to the position of the chancellor of the southern government (南府宰相) during Emperor Muzong of Liao's reign. When Emperor Jingzong assumed power in 969, Yelü Sha was tasked to command the army on Liao's southern border for possible war against the Song dynasty. In 976, the Song army attacked Northern Han, a small kingdom wedged between Song and Liao, and Yelü Sha took the Liao troops to assist Northern Han until the Song army withdrew. He was promoted when he presented the Song prisoners to Emperor Jingzong.

In 977, Song invaded Northern Han again, and Liao army under the overall command of Yelü Sha went to assist Northern Han, meeting the Song army across a river at Baimaling (白馬嶺, in today's Yu County, Shanxi). The vanguard general Yelü Dilie (耶律敵烈), Emperor Jingzong's cousin, went against Yelü Sha's advice to attempt cross the river without waiting for the main Liao army. His army was annihilated in the river, and Yelü Dilie was among the five Liao generals slain, which also include Yelü Sha's son Yelü Deli (耶律德裏). Only after the arrival of general Yelü Xiezhen's reinforcement did the Song attacks stop. Soon afterwards, just as Yelü Sha prepared to advance to Northern Han's capital of Taiyuan, news of the fall of Northern Han arrived.

Immediately after conquering Northern Han, the Song army went northward to attack Liao. Yelü Sha resisted the Song army, and with the help of generals Yelü Xiezhen and Yelü Xiuge, defeated the Song army at the battle of Gaoliang River.

The following year, Yelü Sha followed Han Kuangsi (韓匡嗣) to invade Song, and their army was annihilated. Furious, Emperor Jingzong wanted to execute both, but his wife Xiao Chuo pleaded on their behalves, eventually reducing their sentences to flogging.

After the death of Emperor Jingzong, his widow Xiao Chuo effectively ruled Liao. In 987 Yelü Sha participated in another invasion of Song, this time defeating the resistant Song army, and was awarded as a result.

== In popular culture ==
- Portrayed by Jin Youming in the 2020 Chinese TV Series The Legend of Xiao Chuo.

== Sources ==
- (in Chinese) Toqto'a; et al. (1344). Liao Shi (遼史) [History of Liao].
