= Legendary Fighter: Yang's Heroine =

2001 Chinese television series

- DVD cover
- 杨门女将—女儿当自强
- Genre: Costume drama; Wuxia
- Based on: The Generals of the Yang Family
- Screenplay by: Wang Lizhi
- Directed by: Yuen Ying-ming; Huang Weiming; Wai Hon-to
- Starring: Carman Lee; Theresa Lee; Ning Jing; Cheng Pei-pei; Andrew Lin; Ken Chang; Wang Yu-wen; Sun Li; Roger Kwok
- Opening theme: "An Affair to Remember" (女儿当自强)
- Ending theme: "Naive" (纯真) by Mayday
- Composer: Mak Chun-hung
- Countries of origin: China; Taiwan; Hong Kong; Singapore
- Original language: Mandarin
- No. of episodes: 40

Production
- Producers: Karen Tsoi; Stephen Lam
- Running time: ≈45 minutes per episode
- Production company: Chinese Entertainment Shanghai

Original release
- Release: 2001

Legendary Fighter: Yang's Heroine (杨门女将—女儿当自强) is a 2001 Chinese costume drama television series produced by Chinese Entertainment Shanghai in conjunction with Taiwan Television, Singapore Press Holdings, and China Film Group Corporation. Starring cast members from mainland China, Taiwan, Hong Kong and Singapore, the series is based on stories in The Generals of the Yang Family collection, focusing specifically on the women in the stories.

== Cast ==
- Cheng Pei-pei as She Saihua
- Carman Lee as Yang Yanqi (Yang Bamei)
- Theresa Lee as Yang Paifeng
- Cai Jing as Lady Zhou (Yang Daniang)
- Wang Xinfen as Geng Jinhua (Yang Erniang)
- Jin Jing as Dong Yue'e (Yang Sanniang)
- Wang Yu-wen as Lady Luo (Yang Siniang)
- Constance Song as Cheng Fenglian (Yang Wuniang)
- Tung Ai-ling as Princess Chai (Yang Liuniang)
- Sun Li as Du Jin'e (Yang Qiniang)
- Roger Kwok as Yang Yanhui (Yang Silang)
- Wu Yue as Yang Yande (Yang Wulang)
- Ben Wong as Yang Yanzhao (Yang Liulang)
- Andrew Lin as Yang An
- Power Chan as Cheng Gang
- Ken Chang as Yang Zongbao
  - Feng Jiaqi as Yang Zongbao (child)
- Ning Jing as Mu Guiying
  - Lu Qiqi as Mu Guiying (child)
- Dai Chunrong as Empress Dowager Xiao
- Cheung Kam-ching as Emperor Zhenzong
- Michelle Chia as Princess Jinling (Consort Wang)
- Wan Yeung-ming as Beimengduo
- Yueh Leen as Princess Yinjing
- Darren Lim as Jiang Bin
- Bryan Leung as Wang Qin
- Ko Shu-yuan as Xie Jinwu
- Xu Min as Zhao Defang
- Han Tongshan as Kou Zhun
- Huang Daliang as Ren Dao'an
- Zhang Shan as Han Chang
- Marsha Yuan as Jiang Cuiping

== Soundtrack ==
Legendary Fighter: Yang's Heroine Original Television Soundtrack

Soundtrack album by Mak Chun Hung
- Genre: Soundtrack
- Length: 53:48
- Label: Union Records (有容唱片)

=== Track list ===
1. "An Affair to Remember" (女儿当自强) [4:33]
2. "Shadow Killer" (真假刺客谜) [3:58]
3. "Angel Hero" (女将初征) [4:31]
4. "Killing My Son" (辕门斩子) [4:59]
5. "Power of Love" (再战金沙滩) [2:55]
6. "Look Back My Home" (似是故人来) [3:43]
7. "Hot War" (巧盗凤发) [3:13]
8. "Redwood" (降龙木) [4:18]
9. "Down to You" (穆桂英招亲) [3:12]
10. "Love Begins Here" (杨八妹游春) [3:01]
11. "Return to Rightness" (穆桂英归宋) [3:58]
12. "The Rain Seems Coming" (山雨欲来) [3:10]
13. "Visit Mother" (四郎探母) [4:37]
14. "Broke Out" (大破天门阵) [3:40]
