= Zhanghuai =

Zhanghuai (Wade–Giles: Chang-huai) may refer to:

- Crown Prince Zhanghuai (Tang dynasty), Tang dynasty prince, son of Emperor Gaozong of Tang
- Princess Pan, or Empress Zhanghuai, Song dynasty empress
