= Yang Qilang =

Yang Yansi
- Generals of the Yang Family character
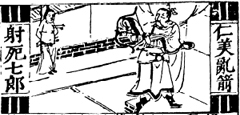
- An illustration from an early copy of the novel Records of the Two Songs, South and North (兩宋南北志傳) depicting Yang Qilang's tragic death. The copy is dated between 1573 and 1620.

In-universe information
- Alias: Yang Xi (楊希); Yang Yanci (楊延慈)
- Nickname: Yang Qilang (楊七郎; "Yang's 7th son")
- Spouse: Du Jin'e (杜金娥)
- Children: Yang Zongying (楊宗英), son
- Father: Yang Ye
- Mother: She Saihua

Yang Qilang (Chinese: 楊七郎; pinyin: Yá Qīláng; literally "Yang's seventh son") is a fictional character in the Generals of the Yang Family legends, the seventh eldest and youngest son of Song dynasty general Yang Ye. In these largely fictionalized stories, he was shot to death with countless arrows by the vengeful Song commander Pan Renmei while seeking reinforcement for his trapped father in battles against the Liao dynasty army.

"Qilang", which means "seventh son", is a nickname rather than an official given name. His official name is usually given as Yang Yansi (楊延嗣).

== Biography ==
Born in a military family, Yang Qilang practiced martial arts from an early age after his parents Yang Ye and She Saihua, as well as his six elder brothers. The novel Records of the Two Songs, South and North (1593) portrayed him as young, impulsive and reckless, and mentioned a time in battle where he without notifying anyone decided to lead 3000 men for a night raid of the enemy's camp. He was ambushed and returned with only half the men, and was ordered to be executed by his father. He eventually received a severe beating of 40 blows which left him bloodied.

=== Killing Pan Bao in competition ===
One day a martial arts competition was held in the Tianqi Temple (天齊廟) in the Song dynasty capital Kaifeng, featuring Pan Bao (潘豹) from the powerful Pan family. With no sense of sportsmanship, Pan had made the rules "to the death", confident that nobody dared to kill him considering his background: his sister had married Emperor Taizong, while his father Pan Renmei was a high-ranking minister and military commander. Yang Qilang who had sneaked out of the house was angered by Pan's arrogance and joined the competition, defeating and eventually killing Pan when the latter continued to dare him and insult his family. Realizing what he had done, Yang Qilang voluntarily submitted to the local police.

A grief-stricken Pan Renmei pleaded to Emperor Taizong to have the entire Yang family executed, for "murdering the emperor's relative should be treated as treason". However, realizing the competition rules set by Pan Bao, Emperor Taizong merely sentenced Yang Qilang to three years in prison. Later, when Yang Qilang was pardoned by the emperor in face of an imminent war with the Liao dynasty and reinstated to the military to "expiate crimes by good deeds", Pan Renmei decided to carry out "justice" himself.

=== Death by hundreds of arrows ===
Facing an invading Liao dynasty army, commander-in-chief Pan Renmei still focused on revenge against the Yangs, and sent Yang Ye and his seven sons to a trap without aid or food. During the battle of Golden Beach, only Yang Qilang, his sixth brother Yang Yanzhao, their father and a few soldiers were left, as the enemy forces closed in. Yang Yanzhao asked his younger brother to fight a way out to the headquarters for aid. When a badly injured and tired Yang Qilang finally arrived, Pan Renmei had him arrested, tied up on a pole, and ordered his soldiers to shoot arrows at him. For whatever reason, the first round of arrows all missed, so Pan Renmei picked up a bow and did the job himself. With dozens of arrows piercing his chest, Yang Qilang kept cursing at Pan Renmei until his death. Pan Renmei had the corpse thrown into the Yellow River which was later discovered by Yang Yanzhao's remaining men downstream.

== Portrayal in films and TV series ==
- Wang Weinian in Generals of the Yang Family (1983) (as Yang Yanci)
- Yang Shoulin in Generals of the Yang Family (1984)
- Yao Chih-hung in Jagged Generals of the Yang Family (1984)
- Tony Leung in The Yang's Saga (1985)
- Chang Hung-lun in A Courageous Clan: Mu Kuei-ying (1989)
- Cao Qinghua & Sun Hong in Generals of the Yang Family (1991)
- Yan Kun in Warriors of the Yang Clan (2004)
- Eddie Peng in The Young Warriors (2006)
- Fu Xinbo in Saving General Yang (2013)

== Historical basis ==
According to History of Song, Yang Ye's seventh eldest son Yang Yanbin (楊延彬), along with a couple brothers, was made a palace guard (殿直) after his father's death in 986. Since he was the only son whose appointment was delayed, historians believe he was less than 15 years old that year. Nothing is known about him otherwise.

The name Yang Yansi probably came from general Yang Si (楊嗣), a military general who fought the Liao dynasty alongside Yang Ye's most distinguished son Yang Yanzhao for much of Emperor Zhenzong of Song's reign. Despite sharing the surname, he came from a different hometown than Yang Yanzhao, but some commoners probably thought they were brothers, explaining the mix-up.

Yang Qilang's tomb was built in 1755 in today's Dai County, Shanxi along with the Yang family ancestral hall, and the name on the headstone is Yang Yanxing (楊延興).

== Sources ==
- (in Chinese) Xiong Damu (1593). Liang Song Nanbei Zhizhuan (兩宋南北志傳) [Records of the Two Songs, South and North].
- (in Chinese) Toqto'a; et al. (1346). Song Shi (宋史) [History of Song].
- (in Chinese) Ji Zhenlun (1606). Yang Jia Fu Shidai Zhongyong Tongsu Yanyi (楊家府世代忠勇通俗演義) [Popular Romance of Generations of Loyal and Brave Yang Family Members].
- (in Chinese) Wang Tingzhang; Fan Wenxian (1813). Zhaodai Xiaoshao (昭代箫韶) [Songbook to Enlighten Generations].
