= Yelü Xiezhen =

- 耶律斜軫
- Died: 999
- Citizenship: Chinese
- Occupation(s): General, politician

Yelü Xiezhen (Chinese: 耶律斜軫; died 999), courtesy name Hanyin (韓隱), was a Khitan general and politician in imperial China's Liao dynasty.

In 969 Yelü Xiezhen became an important general under Emperor Jingzong of Liao. Along with Yelü Xiuge and Yelü Sha, he fought the Song forces many times. In 986 he captured Song general Yang Ye with the help of Yelü Xidi.

== In popular culture ==
- Portrayed by Tim Yu in the 2020 Chinese TV series The Legend of Xiao Chuo.
