= Hero During Yongle Period =

- Traditional Chinese: 永樂英雄兒女
- Simplified Chinese: 永乐英雄儿女
- Hanyu Pinyin: Yŏnglè Yīngxióng Érnǚ
- Genre: Historical, Romance
- Directed by: Yu Min
- Starring: Liu Tao; Bao Jianfeng; Kou Shixun; Liu Xiaoqing; Tang Guoqiang; Chen Long
- Ending theme: Bu Fang'ai by Chen Tong
- Composer: Hero by Sun Nan
- Country of origin: China
- Original language: Mandarin
- No. of episodes: 38

Production
- Executive producer: Zhang Jizhong
- Production location: Hengdian World Studios

Hero During Yongle Period (Chinese: 永乐英雄儿女) is a 2003 Chinese historical romance television series directed by Yu Min, produced by Zhang Jizhong, and starring Liu Tao, Bao Jianfeng, Kou Shixun, Liu Xiaoqing, Tang Guoqiang, and Chen Long. The television series picks up the story of Princess Man'er, the daughter of Yongle Emperor, who was married to Feng Tianci while they inspected the conditions of the people in the south of the Yangtze River.

== Synopsis ==
After Hongwu Emperor died on June 24, 1398, his grandson Zhu Yunwen ascended the throne as the second emperor of the Ming dynasty, his reign did not last long: an attempt to restrain his uncles led to the Jingnan rebellion. The Jianwen Emperor was eventually overthrown by one of his uncles, Zhu Di, who was then enthroned as the Yongle Emperor. Yongle Emperor has a daughter, Princess Man'er, she is a mischievous girl. When they inspected the conditions of the people in the south of the Yangtze River, she falls in love with Feng Tianci, a childhood playmate who led the Ming army defeated the Mongols.

== Cast ==
=== Main ===
- Liu Tao as Princess Man'er, daughter of Yongle Emperor.
- Bao Jianfeng as Feng Tianci, husband of Princess Man'er.
- Kou Shixun as Yongle Emperor, father of Princess Man'er, he loves Jin Niang.
- Liu Xiaoqing as Jin Niang, the hostess of Wanggui Pavilion, a boite in Peking. She loves Hu Bugui, an officer in the Jianwen Period.
- Tang Guoqiang as Jianwen Emperor.
- Chen Long as Xuande Emperor.

=== Supporting ===
- Yan Danchen as Tie Hanyan
- Ma Ling as Concubine Ji
- Qiu Yongli as Ji Gang
- Niu Piao as Hu Bugui
- Ren Silu as Liu Mengru
- Yang Rong as Ling'er
- Li Qi as Feng Yidao
- Li Qingqing as Feng Tianci's mother.
- Zhang Xueying as young Jin Niang

== Soundtrack ==
No.	Title	Lyrics	Music	Singers	Length
1.	"Bu Fang'ai (不妨碍)" (Opening theme)	Wei Ren	Chen Tong	Jason Zhang
2.	"Hero (英雄)" (Ending theme)	Fan Xiaobin	Chen Tong
