= The Generals of the Yang Family =

Chinese folklore, play and novel collection

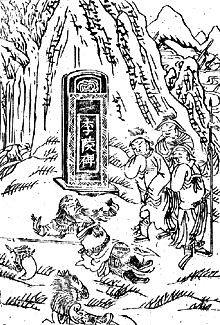
- Yang Ye committing suicide by ramming his head against a stele dedicated for Li Ling. From one 1823 print of the novel Complete Legends of Northern Song's Golden Spears (北宋金鎗全傳). (Note: Essentially the same novel, with slight modifications by publishers and editors, as the second half of Records of the Two Songs, South and North (兩宋南北志傳) written by Xiong Damu (熊大木) in the late 16th century.)
- Traditional Chinese: 楊家將
- Simplified Chinese: 杨家将
- Literal meaning: Yang-Family Generals
Transcriptions
Standard Mandarin
- Hanyu Pinyin: Yáng Jiā Jiàng
- Wade–Giles: Yang^{2} Chia^{1} Chiang^{4}
Yue: Cantonese
- Yale Romanization: Yeung^{4} Ga^{1} Jeung^{3}
- Jyutping: Joeng^{4} Gaa^{1} Zoeng^{3}

The Generals of the Yang Family is a collection of Chinese folklore, plays and novels on a military family from the earlier years of imperial China's Song dynasty (960–1279). The stories recount the unflinching loyalty and the remarkable bravery of the Yangs as they sacrificed themselves to defend their country from foreign military powers, namely the Khitan-ruled Liao dynasty (907–1125) and Tangut-ruled Western Xia (1038–1227).

Spanning the century from 950 to 1050, the mostly fictional saga was based on the lives of historical characters Yang Ye (died 986), Yang Ye's son Yang Yanzhao (c. 958–1014) and Yang Yanzhao's grandson Yang Wenguang (died 1074). As Yang Yanzhao was nicknamed "sixth son" (六郎) in history, the stories made him Yang Ye's sixth eldest son. Also, as Yang Wenguang was close to two generations younger than his father, the stories made him Yang Yanzhao's grandson instead.

== Historical basis ==
=== Historical background ===
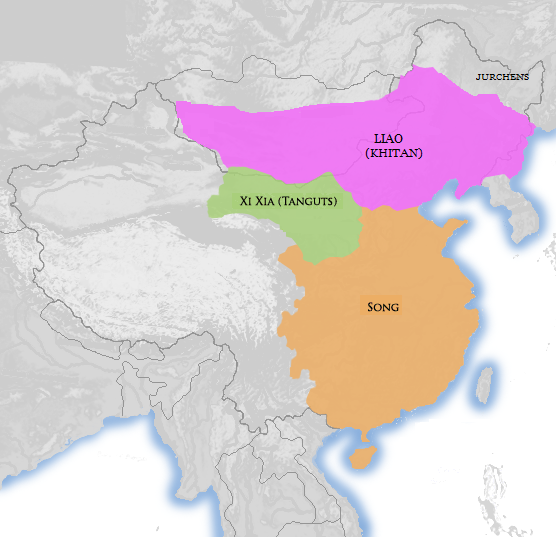
A map from the year 1111, showing the geographical position of the Song dynasty relative to the two neighbor countries it had to pay indemnities to: the Khitan-ruled Liao dynasty to its north and the Tangut-ruled Western Xia Empire to its northwest.

In 907, when the Tang dynasty officially ended, imperial China entered the chaotic and fragmented phase known as the Five Dynasties and Ten Kingdoms period. The decades that followed were marked by regional warlords, many legitimizing themselves as emperors, fighting amongst one another for power and territories. The year 907 also marked the beginning of such a militaristic state – officially called the Liao after 947 – established by Khitan people in roughly today's Liaoning and Inner Mongolia. The Khitans were largely nomadic people and frequently engaged in raids of the more affluent agricultural Han Chinese and Korean people in the south for wealth.

The southern area known as the Central Plain, or the Chinese heartland, defended against the Khitan incursions with strategical points or passes established roughly along the line of the old Great Wall. However, the area including these passes, known as the Sixteen Prefectures, were given to the Liao dynasty in 936 by general Shi Jingtang, in exchange for military aid in Shi's personal war against the Later Tang. With no more passes impeding their army, the Khitans gained unlimited access to the Central Plain: just a decade later, they easily took their army south to extinguish the same Later Jin they helped Shi establish.

Even though the Khitans did not occupy the Central Plain, partially because their constant looting had caused unmanageable unrest, the sad fate of Later Jin already illustrated the danger looming in the north for any succeeding Chinese dynasty. When the Song dynasty was established in the Central Plain in 960, it first tried to appease the Liao dynasty to focus on campaigns against the states in southern China, but the goal of recovering the Sixteen Prefectures had always been there.

=== The Yang family ===
(Yang Ye) really earned the respect of his soldiers. The soldiers under him could not bear to leave him, they'd rather die in battle with him. The spirit of loyalty and righteousness is quite apparent. — A Yuan dynasty historian commenting in History of Song (1345)

Yang Ye, a general of the Northern Han Kingdom, was nicknamed "Invincible" (無敵) due to his tactical prowess and unmatched gallantry in battle. He served the Song dynasty after Liu Jiyuan, ruler of Northern Han, surrendered. Emperor Taizong of Song had great faith in Yang Ye and commissioned him to defend Song's northern border from the Khitan-ruled Liao dynasty. Yang Ye proved himself by defeating the Liao in the Battle of Yanmen Pass, instilling fear in the enemy but also incurring the jealousy of some Song officials.

In 986, during a northern campaign against Liao forces, the Song force commanded by General Pan Mei was attacked by the main enemy force. Pan Mei and others forced Yang Ye to lead an army to resist a much larger enemy despite Yang Ye's opposition. Yang Ye engaged Liao forces in a bloody battle at Chenjiagu (陳家谷), but reinforcements did not arrive as promised. Surrounded by the much larger army, Yang Ye was captured by Liao forces and starved himself to death. One of Yang Ye's seven sons was also killed. Pan Mei was later demoted by Emperor Taizong for Yang Ye's death.

The most outstanding of Yang Ye's seven sons was Yang Yanzhao, who continued defending Song's northern border from Liao forces for more than two decades. The Khitans feared him. Yang Yanzhao's son Yang Wenguang also became an important general and followed Di Qing on a southern campaign against Nong Zhigao. He also defended Song's western borders from Western Xia.

== Literary development ==
=== Early development: 11th to 13th century ===
Legends on the Yang family began very early. In 1051, even before Yang Wenguang distinguished himself in the military, scholar Ouyang Xiu had inscribed the following on the tombstone of a Yang family relative. He was clearly referring to Yang Ye and Yang Yanzhao:

Father and son were both famous generals, and their tactical knowledge and bravery are known as being without equal. To this day gentlemen throughout the empire and even village kids and country yokels can all speak about them.

The earliest reference to the saga were from the so-called Southern Song (1127–1279), when the Song dynasty had to relocate its capital to Southern China in Lin'an (modern Hangzhou, Zhejiang), for its northern territory had been conquered by the Jurchen-ruled Jin dynasty. Among a recorded list of stories told by Lin'an storytellers, two titles clearly involved the Yang family:

- "Commander Lord Yang" (楊令公)
- "The fifth son becomes a monk" (五郎為僧)

=== Yuan/Ming dynasty plays: 14th to 15th century ===
In a list of plays from Southern Song dynasty's northern neighbor Jin dynasty (1115–1234), one title probably refers to an episode in the Yang saga:

- Da Wang Shumi Cuan (打王樞密爨; "The Skit of Beating Military Affairs Commissioner Wang")

By the Yuan dynasty (1271–1368), plays in the form of zaju on the Yang saga appeared. Many scripts survived in its entirety, almost all compiled the Ming dynasty so their authenticity have

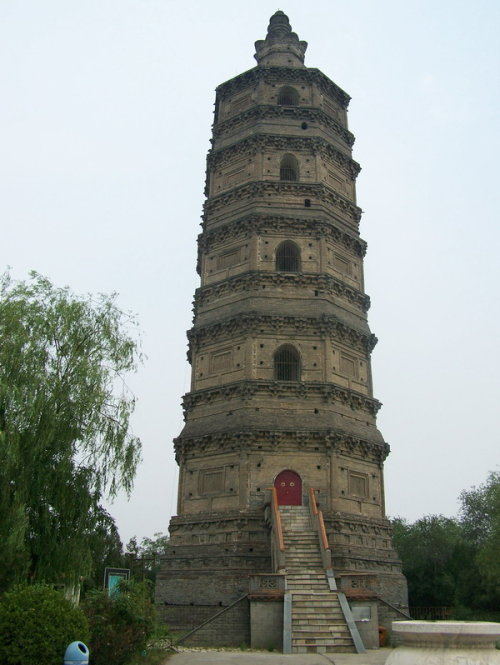
Haotian Pagoda in Beijing, where Yang Ye's bones are said to have been kept by the Khitans after his death. According to legend, the tombs of Jiao Zan and Meng Liang are next to the pagoda today.

- Haotian ta Meng Liang dao gu (昊天塔孟良盜骨; "At Haotian Pagoda Meng Liang Steals the Bones")
- Ba dawang kaizhao jiu zhongchen (八大王開詔救忠臣; "The Eighth Great Prince Opens a Proclamation and Saves a Loyal Vassal")
- Xie Jinwu zha chai Qingfeng fu (謝金吾詐拆清風府; "Xie Jinwu Underhandedly Tears Down Clear Breeze Mansion")
- Yang Liulang diaobing po tianzhen (楊六郎調兵破天陣; "Yang's sixth son lines up his troops and defeats the Heavenly Battle Array")
- Jiao Guangzan huona Xiao Tianyou (焦光贊活拿蕭天佑; "Jiao Guangzan catches Xiao Tianyou alive")
- Huang Meiweng cifu shangshou (黃眉翁賜福上壽; "The Yellow-Eyebrows Greybeard offers blessing and extends longevity")

=== Ming/Qing dynasty novels: 16th to 19th century ===
In Ming dynasty (1368–1644), a number of novels on the Yang family began to appear. The two that have survived to this day both appeared during Wanli Emperor's reign (1572–1620):

- Liang Song Nanbei Zhizhuan (兩宋南北志傳) [Records of the Two Songs, South and North]. The earliest extant version was from 1593, but it was probably written during Jiajing Emperor's reign (1521–1567). The author was almost certainly Xiong Damu (熊大木), a bookstore owner.
- Yang Jia Fu Shidai Zhongyong Tongsu Yanyi (楊家府世代忠勇通俗演義) [Popular Romance of the Loyalty and Bravery over Successive Generations of the Yang Family]. The earliest extant edition was from 1606, but it was likely a slightly revised edition of text from the early 16th century. The author was Qinhuai Moke (秦淮墨客; "The Qinhuai Ink Guest"), believed to be the pen name of Ji Zhenlun (紀振倫), probably a bookstore scribe in Jinling (金陵; modern Nanjing, Jiangsu).

These novels would become the primary source materials for the legends. In the Qing dynasty (1644–1911), more novels appeared. Some are modifications of the previous novels, some retold particular stories, while some are sequels. Other novels with similar settings would also feature characters from the Yang family, for example the novels featuring Zhao Kuangyin (927–976) or Di Qing (1008–1057) as their main character.

Other novels in later settings also included characters who were alleged descendants of the Yang family:

- "Blue Faced Beast" Yang Zhi (楊志), a character in the classical novel Water Margin, is a fictitious descendant of Yang Ye.
- Yang Zaixing (died 1140), a historical general of the Southern Song dynasty, was said to be a descendant of Yang Ye through Yang Yanzhao in the novel Shuo Yue Quanzhuan (說岳全傳) about Yue Fei. Yang Zaixing had two sons, Yang Zhengyuan (楊正園) and Yang Zhengguo (楊正國).

=== Qing dynasty opera: 19th century ===
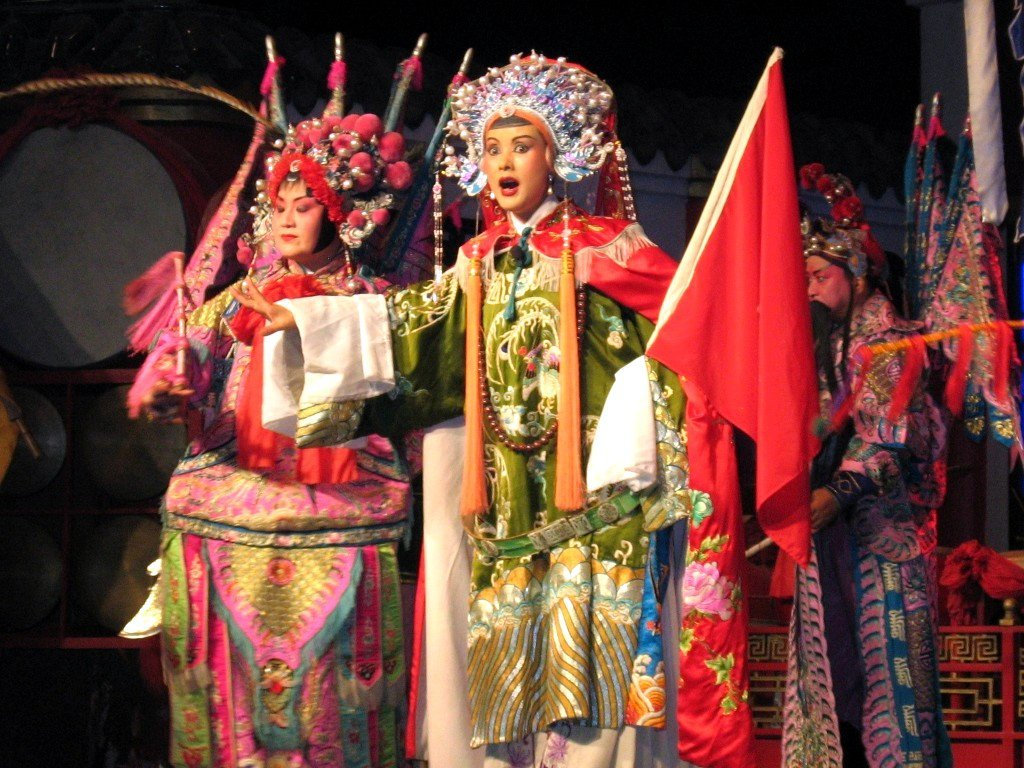
A 2006 Sichuan opera performance of a Generals of the Yang Family story, Chengdu, Sichuan, China.

The Jiaqing Emperor, who reigned from 1796 to 1820, ordered the compilation of a Song Book to Enlighten Generations (昭代箫韶), containing 240 plays in kunqu about the generals of the Yang family. The compilation was published in 1813 and attributed to Wang Tingzhang (王廷章) and Fan Wenxian (范聞賢).

Over the years the opera series was only performed three times due to its length. Later, Empress Dowager Cixi ordered its modification into the Peking opera version, a huge project that lasted from 1898 until 1900 when it was interrupted by the Boxer Rebellion and subsequent foreign invasions.

In addition to the plays shown in the Forbidden City, qinqiang, yuju, pingju and many other local Chinese opera forms have all throughout the centuries developed their own stories about generals of the Yang family. Many of the stories aren't found in novels and have vastly enriched the legends. In the 20th century, the stories were greatly popularized in China through the performing art pingshu (storytelling).

== Basic story ==
During the Song dynasty's invasion of the much weaker Northern Han Kingdom, Emperor Taizu of Song's army was surprised by Northern Han general Yang Ye and suffered a major defeat. Song general Pan Renmei was almost killed by Yang Ye and the Song army had no choice but to retreat. Years later, Emperor Taizu's successor Emperor Taizong initiated another invasion, which was again stopped by forces led by Yang Ye, his wife She Saihua, and their seven sons. Pan Renmei was injured by an arrow fired by She Saihua. Emperor Taizong had to bribe corrupt Northern Han officials to create distrust between Northern Han's ruler Liu Jiyuan and Yang Ye. This eventually led to Liu Jiyuan's defeat and surrender.

After Yang Ye's reluctant surrender, Emperor Taizong awarded his family an impressive mansion in the capital Kaifeng called "Heaven Wave House". Gratified, Yang Ye swore allegiance to the emperor and defeated the Liao dynasty forces at Song's northern borders again and again. The jealous Pan Renmei, also the emperor's father-in-law, suggested the emperor name his son Pan Bao the vanguard, but the other ministers were not convinced since Pan Bao had no experience. Pan Renmei offered to start a martial arts tournament in Kaifeng's Tianqi Temple, but requested the Yang family not participate. The emperor agreed. Yang Ye locked his sons at home, but on the last day the seventh son sneaked out the house, joined the tournament, and killed Pan Bao (who had been using underhand means to defeat his opponents).

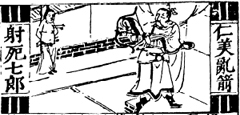
An illustration from an early copy of the novel Records of the Two Songs, South and North (兩宋南北志傳) depicting the seventh son Yang Yansi's tragic death at the hands of Pan Renmei. The copy is dated between 1573 and 1620.

After several attempts to kill Yang family members failed, Pan Renmei turned to the Liao army for help and assisted them in luring and besieging the outnumbered Yang Ye, his seven sons and Emperor Taizong in the border city of Youzhou. With no better options available, Yang Ye's first son volunteered to dress as the emperor and meet the Liao prince for a risky peace talk called the "Double-Dragon Meet" in Golden Beach, while the real Emperor Taizong escaped. As feared, the meeting turned out to be a trap, and only his two youngest sons remained when Yang Ye and his men retreated to Twin Wolves Mountain. Yang Ye asked his seventh son to fight his way out to Pan Renmei's camp to request reinforcements. The seventh son managed to reach Pan Renmei, but was drugged, tied up and shot to death by countless arrows.

Severely outnumbered in the trap and with no sign of reinforcements, Yang Ye also learned about the confirmed deaths of his eldest three sons. To avoid being captured, he committed suicide by knocking his head against a stone tablet bearing Li Ling's name. His sixth son managed to fight a way out back to Song territory, but was confronted by generals ordered by Pan Renmei to kill him. Instead, the generals (who all respected Yang Ye) told him about his seventh brother's death and let him go. On the way back to Kaifeng, the sixth son befriended a man named Wang Qin, who unbeknownst to him was a Liao spy.

When Emperor Taizong received the sixth son's report about Pan Renmei's crimes, he also received a report by Pan Renmei accusing the Yangs of treason. The first judge of the case was bribed by Pan Renmei's daughter Consort Pan and tried to help the Pans, but was stopped by the emperor's nephew Zhao Defang, also known as the "Eighth Virtuous Prince". The second judge escaped from his post for fear of offending the Pans. After a long time, the Eighth Virtuous Prince finally located a candidate for the post, a provincial official named Kou Zhun, who despite having only held minor posts before, had a reputation of intelligence and moral principles. Finally, Kou Zhun convicted Pan Renmei of multiple crimes and executed him with the help of the Eighth Virtuous Prince.

Succeeding his father as the new commander of the Song army, the sixth son Yang Yanzhao continued to fight the Liao forces under the new emperor. Emperor Zhenzong honored the Yang family by building a stone epitaph, which was disrespected by Xie Jinwu – the son-in-law of Wang Qin who had since become a high official. After Xie Jinwu received a heavy beating by the women in the Yang household, trouble began to arise which resulted in Yang Yanzhao being notified at the border. Worried about his mother, he violated military rules by rushing back to the capital without permission together with a subordinate Jiao Zan. Jiao couldn't control his anger and killed Xie Jinwu, creating more trouble.

Finally reinstated, Yang Yanzhao accidentally learned that his fifth brother had survived the events at Golden Beach and was a monk at Mount Wutai. Having given his soul to the Buddha in despair after the fighting at Golden Beach, the fifth brother now refused to participate in the Song army or return home, but he proved that blood is thicker than water by helping his brother at a critical time and killing the enemy. Meanwhile, their sister – Yang Ye's eighth child – learned that her father's remains and golden sabre were kept by the Liao in Haotian Pagoda so she went across the border by herself in an attempt to retrieve the items. She was arrested but escaped with help from someone who turned out to be her fourth brother, now under the false identity "Mu Yi" and had married a Liao princess.

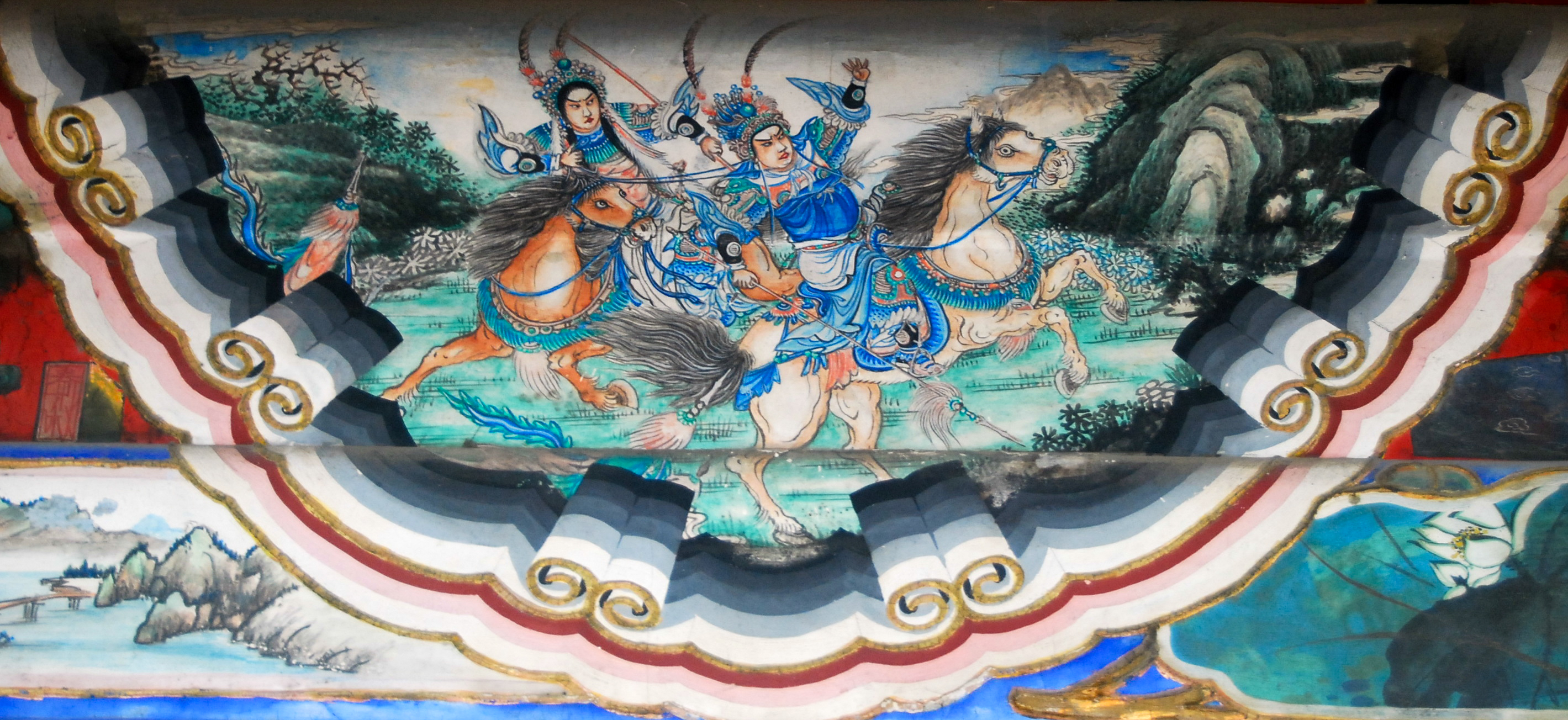
A 19th-century mural painting at the Long Corridor of Summer Palace, Beijing, depicting Yang Zongbao's capture by his future wife Mu Guiying.

When Yang Zongbao, the son of Yang Yanzhao and Princess Chai, travelled to the Muke Fort in search of the Dragon Subduing Wood, which would help in breaking Liao army's Heaven Gate Formation, he met Mu Guiying, who married him after capturing him. Mu Guiying would prove instrumental in breaking the Heaven Gate Formation with the rest of the Yangs.

Around that time, Western Xia invaded Song, and Yang Zongbao was killed in action. When Yang Yanzhao died, there were few males left in the Yang family; so, the twelve women in the family participated in the campaign against Western Xia. The female generals of the Yang family proved that they were not inferior to their male counterparts.

== Historical and cultural sites ==
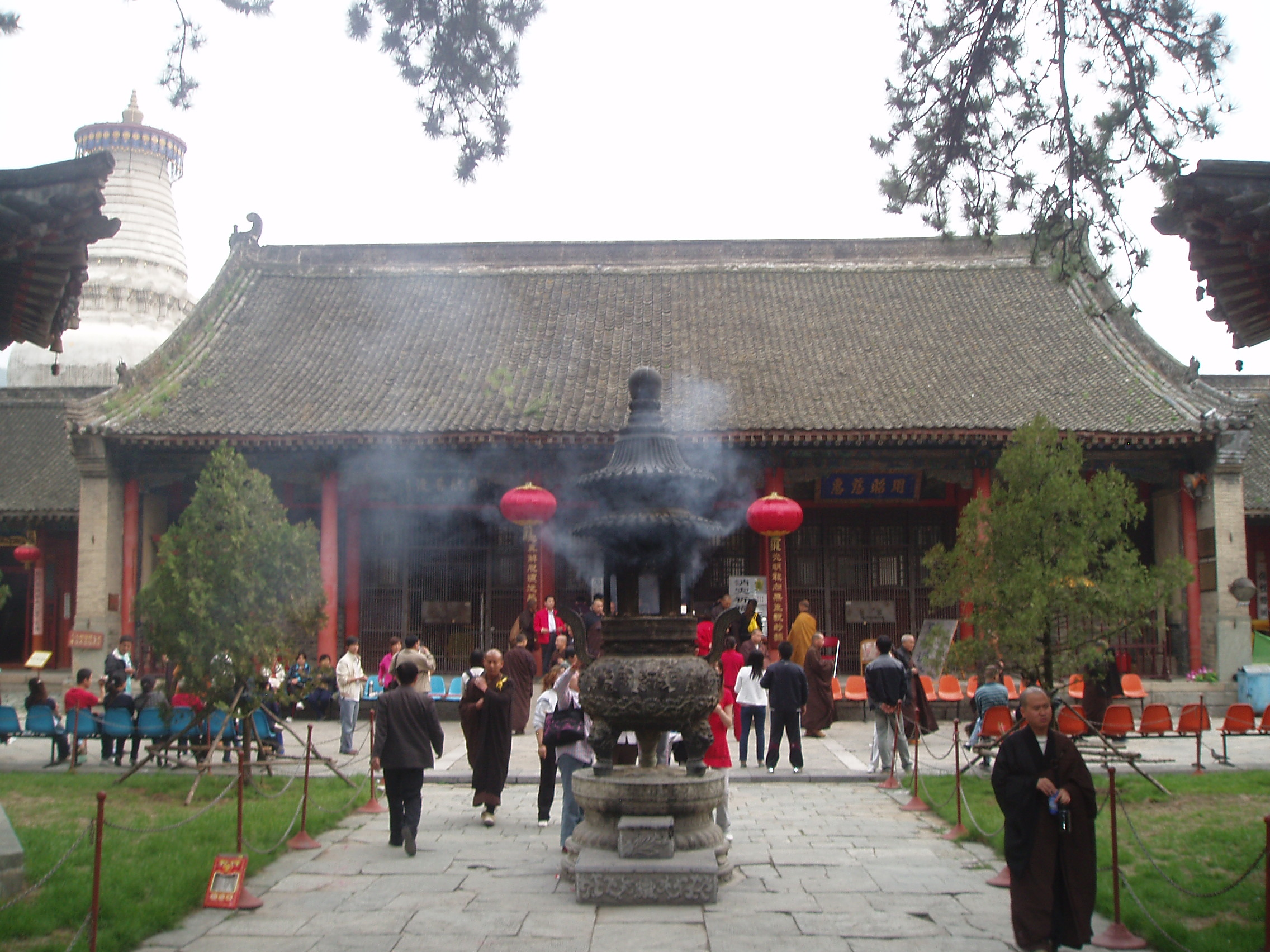
Xiantong Temple in Mount Wutai, Shanxi Province, where an iron pole kept is said to the one used by Yang Wulang (Yang Ye's fifth son).

Due to the popularity of the stories throughout the Chinese-speaking world, numerous memorial sites including temples and tombs have been built over the centuries throughout China to commemorate Yang Ye and the Yang family. Many locations have no known and realistic relationship with the Yangs, yet still claim that events from the stories occurred there. Some of the most well-known sites include:

- Invincible Yang Temple (楊無敵廟) in Gubeikou, Beijing, built some time before 1055, when the location was still under Liao control. (Note: At least 3 poems about this temple at the location were written within 103 years of Yang Ye's death by Song envoy messengers to Liao. They are: "Passing Gubeikou's Invincible Yang Temple" (過古北口楊無敵廟) written by Liu Chang (劉敞) in 1055; "Passing Gubeikou's Invincible Yang Temple with Zhongxun" (和仲巽過古北口楊無敵廟) written by Su Song (蘇頌) in 1079; and "Gubeikou's Invincible Yang Temple" (古北口楊無敵廟) by Su Che (蘇轍) in 1089.) Over the years many generals renovated the temple to pay their respects, including Xu Da in the 14th century and Feng Yuxiang in the early 20th century. It was destroyed in the Cultural Revolution but has since been rebuilt according to old photos.
- Tian Bo Yang House (天波楊府) in Kaifeng, Henan, the capital of Song dynasty during the Yangs' time. The name "Tian Bo" (天波; literally "Heaven Wave") is the name of the house of the Yangs in popular legends. The house was built in 1992 as a tourist attraction. The location in Kaifeng was chosen based on records written in the 14th century. Some historians doubt whether the Yangs actually had a house in Kaifeng like the records claimed.
- Yang Family Ancestral Hall (楊家祠堂) in Dai County, Shanxi. Allegedly this is the location of Yang family when Yang Ye was serving the Northern Han Kingdom. It was built in 1329.
- Yang Family City (楊家城) in Shenmu County, Shaanxi, Yang Ye's birthplace. The city walls were built in 748, but at least since 1098 it has been called Yang Family City. The Seven-Star Temple (七星廟) where Yang Ye and She Saihua allegedly married is about 25 km away (the name of course refers to their seven sons).

== Modern references ==
Stories about the Yang family have been retold in the form of folk tales, stage plays and opera, novels, manhua (comics), films and television dramas.

=== Literature ===
- Wilt L. Idema and Stephen H. West's The Generals of the Yang Family-Four Early Plays, offers a complete translation of four early plays of the Yang Family Generals.
- Yang Zhi (Water Margin), the Blue-Faced Beast of the Water Margin, is a fictional descendant of the Yang Generals.
- In Louis Cha's Condor Trilogy, Yang Tiexin (楊鐵心), Yang Kang (楊康) and Yang Guo (楊過) are fictitious descendants of Yang Zaixing.

=== Opera and music ===
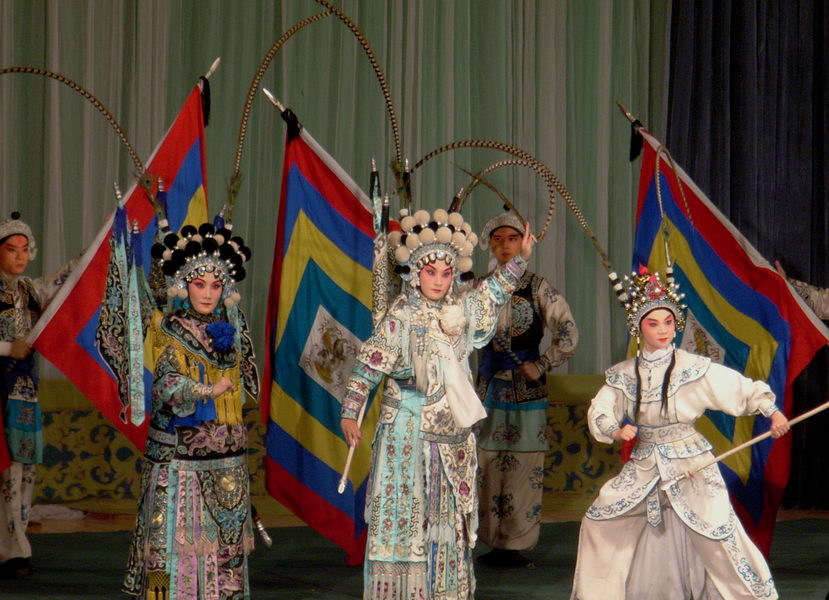
A 2007 Peking opera performance of a Generals of the Yang Family story, Beijing, China.

Composer Du Mingxin wrote a Beijing opera to a Chinese libretto titled Yang Men Nü Jiang (simplified Chinese: 杨门女将; traditional Chinese: 楊門女將; pinyin: Yáng Mén Nǚ Jiàng; lit. 'The Female Generals of the Yang family'). The opera was based on the Yangju opera Commanding the Troops at 100 Years Old, and was first performed in 1960 by the China Peking Opera Company. The opera is set during the war between the Northern Song dynasty and the Kingdom of Western Xia, after the death of Song general Yang Zongbao. Yang Zongbao's 100-year-old grandmother, She Saihua, along with Mu Guiying and other widows of the Yang family, lead the Song army to resist the invaders.

In 2000 Du Mingxin also produced a symphonic version of the opera for the China Philharmonic Orchestra (CPO), consisting of an overture, three movements and an epilogue. This was the first symphonic work commissioned for the newly established CPO at that time.

=== Films ===
Year	Title	Production	Main cast
1972	The 14 Amazons 十四女英豪	Shaw Brothers Studio; Hong Kong	Ivy Ling Po, Lisa Lu, Lily Ho, Yueh Hua, Shu Pei-pei, Chin Fei, Tien Feng, Tsung Hua, Lo Lieh, Paul Chun
1983	The Eight Diagram Pole Fighter 五郎八卦棍	Shaw Brothers Studio; Hong Kong	Gordon Liu, Alexander Fu, Kara Hui, Lily Li, Ko Fei, Lam Hak-ming, Wang Lung-wei, Yeung Jing-jing
1984	The Generals of the Yang Family 楊家將	Henan Performing Arts et al. Mainland China / Hong Kong	Nie Jianguo, Yang Shoulin, Wang Jian, Shi Changjin, Xu Qingxiang, Cao Xuezhi, Ding Gonghe, Ma Lin
1985	The Eight Diagram Cudgel Fighter 如來八卦棍	Hop Chung Films et al. Hong Kong / Mainland China	Leung Siu-lung, Guan Zongxiang, Wang Cho-shut, Kwan Hoi-san, Gam San, Wang Lingqian, Chan Dik-hak
2006	Assault on Divergence 血濺三岔口	CCTV-6 et al. Mainland China	Yi Zhen, Wu Yue, Zhao Hongfei, Zhao Liang, Shi Daimei, Luan Jian, Hu Bo, Gouzi
2011	Legendary Amazons 楊門女將之軍令如山	Shanghai Film Group et al. Mainland China	Cecilia Cheung, Richie Jen, Cheng Pei-pei, Liu Xiaoqing, Kathy Chow, Xiao Mingyu, Zhou Xiaofei, Yukari Oshima
2013	Saving General Yang 忠烈楊家將	Pegasus Motion Pictures et al. Hong Kong / Mainland China	Adam Cheng, Ekin Cheng, Yu Bo, Vic Chou, Li Chen, Raymond Lam, Wu Chun, Fu Xinbo, Shao Bing, Xu Fan
2019	Battle Between Song and Liao Dynasties 大破天门阵	Shanghai Renjia Culture Media et al. Mainland China	Siqin Gaowa, Wang Jinxin, Mei Li-er, Angel Fuhe

Musical films

- How Muk Kwai-ying Thrice Captured and Released Yeung Chung-bo (穆桂英三擒三縱楊宗保), a 1956 Hong Kong film in Cantonese opera.
- Eighth Sister Yeung (楊八妹招親), a 1956 Hong Kong film in Cantonese opera.
- How Muk Kwai-ying and Yeung Chung-bo Defeated the Heavenly Gate Militia (穆桂英楊宗保大破天門陣), a 1957 Hong Kong film in Cantonese opera.
- Mu Guiying Battling in Hongzhou (穆桂英大戰洪州), a 1958 Chinese film in Peking opera.
- Mu Guiying Takes Command (穆桂英掛帥), a 1958 Chinese film in Yu opera.
- The Fourth Son (四郎探母), a 1959 Hong Kong film in Cantonese opera.
- Golden Sword (楊八妹取金刀), a 1959 Hong Kong film in Cantonese opera.
- Yang Female Warriors (楊門女將), a 1960 Chinese film in Peking opera.
- Conqueress (無敵楊家將), a 1961 Hong Kong film in Cantonese opera.
- Muk Kwai-ying Finds a Husband (穆桂英招親), a 1962 Hong Kong film in Teochew opera.
- She Saihua (佘賽花), a 1984 Chinese film in the shangdanglaozi (上黨落子) opera genre.

=== Television series ===
Year	Title	Production	Main cast
1981	Young's Female Warriors 楊門女將	TVB; Hong Kong	Liza Wang, Fung Bo Bo, Seung Yee, Shek Sau, Lee Lam-lam, Mary Hon, Ha Yu, Tsang Hing-yu, Kwan Chung
1983	The Generals of the Yang Family 楊家將	Shanxi Television; Mainland China	Chang Wenzhi, Qika Kuerban, Zhou Ximeng, Yang Dawei, Sun Feipeng, Zhang Jizhong, Wang Weinian
1984	The Jagged Generals of the Yang Family 鐵血楊家將	Taiwan Television; Taiwan	Sze-ma Yu-chiao, David Chiang, Chang Ping-yu, Kwan Chung, Chang Chung, Chiang Kui-pei, Pan Tieh-hsiang, Emily Chu
1985	The Yang's Saga 楊家將	TVB; Hong Kong	Andy Lau, Tony Leung, Felix Wong, Michael Miu, Kent Tong, Yeung Chak-lam, Chow Yun-fat, Lau Siu-ming, Carina Lau, Margie Tsang
1989	A Courageous Clan: Mu Kuei-ying 一門英烈穆桂英	Chinese Television System; Taiwan	Ngai Chow-wah, Chang Chen-huan, Lung Lung, Tu Man-sheng, Lee Li-feng, Mao Ying, Jin Chao-chun
1991	The Generals of the Yang Family 楊家將	Shanxi Television; Mainland China	Li Zhiyi, Guan Xinwei, Xu Chenglin, Zhang Yujia, Zhang Dengqiao, Liu Jie, Chen Lingdi, Liu Lihua, Zhu Mi
1994	The Heroic Legend of the Yang's Family 碧血青天楊家將	Asia Television; Hong Kong	Chu Siu-keung, Yan Chi-keung, Jin Chao-chun, Paul Chun, Wong Yim-na, Mak Ging-ting, Lee Heung-kam
1994	The Great General 碧血青天珍珠旗	Asia Television; Hong Kong	Chu Siu-keung, Damian Lau, Lui Chung-yin, Joey Meng, Wong Jung, Yeung Yuk-mui, Loong Koon-tin
1997	Old Westerner Kou 寇老西兒	Beijing Culture & Art A/V et al. Mainland China	Ge You, Chen Daoming, Qu Ying, He Saifei, Zhu Xijuan, Zhong Xinghuo, Huang Zongluo, Cao Li, Li Chengru
1997	Yang's Fourth Son 楊四郎	Shaanxi Television et al. Mainland China	Zhang Fan, Hui Minli, Shi Aihong, Zhang Li, Zhao Donghong, Li Xing, Li Yongsheng, Chen Chaowu
1998	The Heroine of the Yangs (2 parts) 穆桂英	Asia Television; Hong Kong	Amy Chan, Vincent Chiao, Gilbert Lam, Annie Man, Paw Hee-ching, Cao Cuifen, Tam Bing-man
2001	Legendary Fighter: Yang's Heroine 楊門女將—女兒當自強	Chinese Entertainment; Mainland China	Carman Lee, Theresa Lee, Ning Jing, Cheng Pei-pei, Andrew Lin, Ken Chang, Wang Yu-wen, Roger Kwok
2001	The Fire Commander 火帥	Hunan TV & Radio Group et al. Mainland China	Chang Ting, Zhang Tielin, Huang Haibing, Lu Xingyu, Yang Na, Liu Jiayue, Chen Ying, Wang Jiusheng
2004	The Heroine Mu Guiying 巾幗英雄穆桂英	Golden Shield Film & TV et al. Mainland China	Wang Si-yi, Lu Shiyu, Guo Lianwen, Han Yueqiao, Li Guangfu, Zheng Shuang, Zhang Wei, Fan Bingbing
2004	Warriors of the Yang Clan 楊門虎將	Beijing Tianzhong Yinghua et al. Mainland China	Alec Su, Chae Rim, Angie Chiu, Ti Lung, Kou Zhenhai, Wang Yan, Hu Jing, Yan Kun, Bao Jianfeng, Jia Nailiang
2006	The Young Warriors 少年楊家將	Chinese Entertainment et al. Mainland China	Hu Ge, Peter Ho, Chen Long, Eddie Peng, Amy Chan, Weng Chia-ming, Justin Yuan, Lin Chia-yu, Liu Shishi
2011	Mu Guiying Takes Command 穆桂英掛帥	Brother Era Film & TV et al. Mainland China	Miao Pu, Siqin Gaowa, Zhang Tielin, Li Qi, Luo Jin, Yu Chenghui, Shen Baoping, Luan Ruxin, Liu Enyou
2013	Bai Yutang 白玉堂之局外局	Loongs United Investment et al. Mainland China	Xu Honghao, Siqin Gaowa, Jordan Chan, Hou Yong, Ni Dahong, Bao Guo'an, Liu Xiaojie, Zhang Pengpeng

Musical television series

- The Generals of the Yang Family (楊家將), a 1982 series in Taiwanese opera produced by CTS (Taiwan), starring Yang Li-hua as Yang Yanzhao. in 1986, this TV series sequel from 薛丁山救五美 as the last part.
- The Generals of the Yang Family (楊家將), a 1985 series in Taiwanese opera also produced by CTS, starring Yeh Ching as Yang Yanzhao.
- She Saihua (佘賽花), a 2005 Chinese series in Peking opera first broadcast on CCTV-11.

Animation television series

- The Generals of the Yang Family (楊家將), a 2011–2013 Chinese series first broadcast on CCTV-14, so far airing three seasons.

=== Video games ===
- Yang's Troops (Chinese: 楊家將; pinyin: Yángjiā Jiāng)
- Yīmén Yīngliè Yángjiā Jiāng (Chinese: 一門英烈 楊家將), also known as Yang Warrior Family, is an unlicensed beat 'em up game for the Mega Drive that was published in 1990s. It was developed by Taiwan Sanxun Information Co., Ltd. (台湾三协资讯股份有限公司).

== Sources ==
- Hsia, C.T. (1974). "The Military Romance". In Birch, Cyril (ed.). Studies in Chinese Literature Genres. University of California Press. pp. 339–390.
- Idema, Wilt L.; West, Stephen H. (2013). The Generals of the Yang Family: Four Early Plays. World Scientific. ISBN 978-981-4508-68-1.
- Mackerras, Colin P. (1972). The Rise of the Peking Opera: 1770–1870, Social Aspects of the Theatre in Manchu China. Clarendon Press.
- Mote, F.W. (1999). Imperial China: 900–1800. Harvard University Press. ISBN 0-674-44515-5.
- Scott, A.C. (1967). "Ssu Lang Visits His Mother (Ssu Lang T'an Mu, Ching-hsi): A Traditional Peking Play". Traditional Chinese Plays, Volume 1. University of Wisconsin Press. pp. 19–91.
- (in Chinese) Toqto'a; et al., eds. (1345). Song Shi (宋史) [History of Song].
