= She Saihua =

- Generals of the Yang Family character
- from one 1882 print of the early 17th century novel Popular Romance of Generations of Loyal and Brave Yang Family Members (楊家府世代忠勇通俗演義)

In-universe information
- Nickname: She Taijun (佘太君; "Dowager She")
- Gender: Female
- Spouse: Yang Ye (Yang Jiye)
- Children: Yang Yanping, 1st son; Yang Yanding, 2nd son; Yang Yan'an, 3rd son; Yang Yanhui, 4th son; Yang Yande, 5th son; Yang Yanzhao, 6th son; Yang Yansi, 7th son; 2 daughters
- Weapon(s): Dragon-head crutch

She Saihua
- Traditional Chinese: 佘賽花
- Simplified Chinese: 佘赛花
Transcriptions
Standard Mandarin
- Hanyu Pinyin: Shé Sàihuā
Yue: Cantonese
- Yale Romanization: Se^{4} Choi^{3}-fa^{1}
- Jyutping: Se^{4} Coi^{3}-faa^{1}

She Saihua (佘賽花) is a legendary heroine from ancient China's Northern Song Dynasty. The wife of Yang Ye and the mother of their 7 sons, she is a prominent figure in the stories on Generals of the Yang Family.

The elderly and widowed She Saihua is also commonly known as She Taijun (佘太君; "Dowager She") and is usually depicted with a dragon-head cane (龍頭拐杖). She allegedly lived past the age of 100.

== Legends ==
=== Marriage to Yang Ye ===
She Saihua's father She Hong (佘洪) had already arranged for his daughter to marry Yang Ye, but changed his mind and betrothed her to Cui Long (崔龍) from the more powerful Cui family instead. When the Yang family requested marriage, She Hong sent for Cui Long to come quickly to marry his daughter. She Saihua did not like the ugly and untalented Cui Long and sent a messenger for Yang Ye. After Yang Ye's arrival and at the request of She Saihua, She Hong had no choice but to declare that the winner of the duel between the suitors would marry his daughter. Yang Ye killed Cui Long in the battle but accidentally injured She Hong who tried to help Cui Long. Angry, She Saihua fought Yang Ye who retreated to the Seven-Star Temple. Inside the temple, Yang Ye clarified the misunderstanding and they married.

The Seven-Star Temple where they allegedly married is located in today's Fugu County, Shaanxi province.

=== Taking command of the army ===
She Saihua had 7 sons and 2 daughters with Yang Ye, the Song commander-in-chief. With Pan Mei refusing to send aid, Yang Ye and several sons died during the battles of Golden Beach and Mount Twin Wolves. Lady She made sure Pan Mei's crimes did not go unnoticed and successfully prosecuted him in the imperial court. Trusting her loyalty and judgment, Emperor Taizong made her the commander-in-chief and awarded her a Dragon Head Cane, a symbol of the emperor, for absolute control of the male-dominated army.

== Historical claim ==
While Yang Ye is a real historical character, no historical records mentioned his wife until the Qing Dynasty, which mentioned Yang Ye marrying a Lady She (折氏), the daughter of a Later Zhou-turned Song general She Deyi (折德扆). While this seems possible considering She Deyi and Yang Ye's age and geography, not all historians are convinced of the claim, especially since the fictitious character with the homonym surname She (佘) had already appeared back in the Yuan Dynasty and was widely known by Qing Dynasty.

== Worship ==
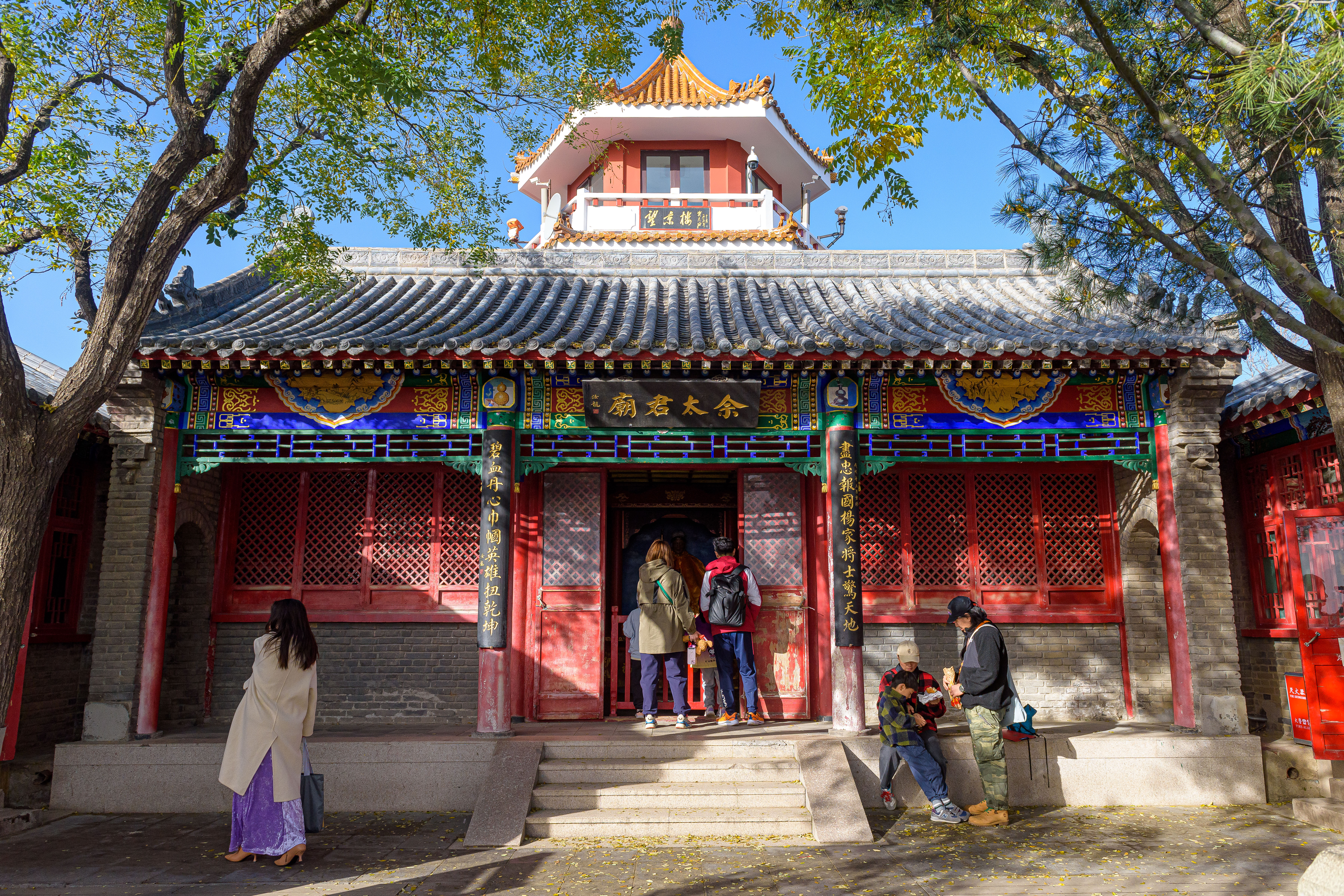
She Taijun Temple

"She Taijun Temple" (佘太君廟) is located in Baiwangshan Forest Park in Haidian District, Beijing, China.

== Portrayal in films and TV series ==
- Lisa Lu in The 14 Amazons (1972)
- Sheung Yee in Young's Female Warrior (1981) and The Yang's Saga (1985)
- Zhang Dengqiao in Generals of the Yang Family (1983) and Generals of the Yang Family (1991)
- Lily Li in The Eight Diagram Pole Fighter (1984)
- Ma Chunxi in Generals of the Yang Family (1984)
- Chang Ping-yu in Jagged Generals of the Yang Family (1984)
- Lee Li-feng in A Courageous Clan: Mu Kuei-ying (1989)
- Zhang Jing, Wang Jianying (& Zhang Dengqiao) in Generals of the Yang Family (1991)
- Lee Heung-kam in Heroic Legend of the Yang's Family & The Great General (1994)
- Zhu Xijuan in Kou Laoxi'er (1997)
- Zhao Donghong in Yang Silang (1997)
- Cao Cuifen in The Heroine of the Yangs (1998)
- Cheng Pei-pei in Legendary Fighter: Yang's Heroine (2001) and Legendary Amazons (2011)
- Wang Ruoli in The Fire Commander (2001)
- Wang Liyuan in The Heroine Mu Guiying (2004)
- Angie Chiu in Warriors of the Yang Clan (2004)
- Amy Chan in The Young Warriors (2006)
- Siqin Gaowa in Mu Guiying Takes Command (2011)
- Xu Fan in Saving General Yang (2013)
- Siqin Gaowa in Battle Between Song and Liao Dynasties (大破天门阵) (2019)
