= Yang Yande =

- Generals of the Yang Family character

In-universe information
- Nickname: Yang Wulang (楊五郎; "Yang's 5th son")
- Father: Yang Ye
- Mother: She Saihua

Yang Yande (Chinese: 楊延德; pinyin: Yáng Yándé) is a fictional character in the Generals of the Yang Family legends, the fifth eldest son of Song dynasty general Yang Ye. In these largely fictionalized stories, he survived the battle against the Liao dynasty army that killed his father, and left to become a Buddhist monk.

He is also known as Yang Wulang (楊五郎) which means "5th son," and is a nickname rather than an official given name.

== Biography ==
Born in a military family, Yang Wulang practiced martial arts from an early age after his parents Yang Ye and She Saihua, as well as his 6 brothers. In particular, Wuliang was adept at his family's style of spear fighting. During the battle of Mount Twin Wolves, General Yang Ye's army was surrounded by enemies. Yang Yande's eldest three brothers had already died and his fourth older brother was missing. His younger brother Yang Yanzhao asked the seventh son of General Yang to seek aid while he tried to fight a way out for their father. Having lost contact with his family in the battle, and knowing the Song army had lost the day, Yande left the battlefield and made his way to the Buddhist monastery at Mount Wutai (transliterated as Ng Toi in Cantonese).

As a monk, Yande could no longer keep or wield lethal weapons. So he removed the head of his spear, and adapted his spear fighting techniques into staff techniques. The style he created became known as Fifth Brother Eight Trigram Pole, or Ng Lung Ba Gwa Gwan (五郎八卦棍). This pole form is still practiced, particularly in Hung Gar kung fu.

== Portrayal in films and TV series ==
- Kong Ngai in Young's Female Warrior 1981
- Gordon Liu in The Eight Diagram Pole Fighter (1983) (as Ng-long)
- Bruce Leung in The Eight Diagram Cudgel Fighter 1988
- Felix Wong in The Yang's Saga (1985) (as Ng-long)
- Wu Yue in Legendary Fighter - Yang's Heroine (2001) (as Ng-long)
- Bao Jianfeng in Warriors of the Yang Clan (2004)
- Jonny Chen in The Young Warriors (2006)
- Raymond Lam in Saving General Yang (2013)
