= Yelü Xidi =

Ancient Chinese military general

Names
- Family name: Yēlǜ (耶律); Given name: Xīdī (奚低)

Yelü Xidi (耶律奚低) or Yelü Xida (耶律希達) was a Khitan general in ancient China's Liao dynasty, flourishing during Emperor Jingzong's reign.

In 986 he followed general Yelü Xiezhen to fight the forces from Song dynasty led by general Yang Ye. Yang Ye was defeated at south of Shuozhou and hid in the forests. Yelü Xidi being a very good archer saw him and shot him down from the horse using an arrow. Yang Ye was later captured by Liao forces.

Yelü Xidi later followed Empress Dowager Xiao in her southern conquest and achieved in battles. He died from an illness.

== Sources ==
- (in Chinese) Toqto'a et al. (1344). History of Liao.
