= Yelü Xiuge =

Liao Dynasty general

- Born: unknown
- Died: 998
Names
- Chinese; Family name: Yēlǜ (耶律); Given name: Xiūgē (休哥); Courtesy name: Xùnníng (遜寧); Khitan; Second name: *Suniń (𘰷𘳕𘰕) ⟨s.un.ń⟩ Given name: *Xiuge (𘱥𘬛 𘱚𘱮) ⟨x.iu g.e⟩
- Father: Yelü Wansi (耶律綰思)

Yelü Xiuge (耶律休哥) (died 998) was a Khitan general and politician in imperial China's Liao dynasty. He commanded a disciplined army and fought the Song forces for several decades, taking care to not harm any innocent individual. The History of Liao records that adults during the Song Dynasty would yell "Here comes Yuyue (于越)!" to stop children from crying. Yuyue was Yelü Xiuge's title.

Yelü Xiuge's tomb was discovered in 2002 in Fuxin, Liaoning Province, China.

== In popular culture ==
- Portrayed by Ruan Shengwen in the 2020 Chinese TV series The Legend of Xiao Chuo.
