= Princess Pan =

Song dynasty empress

Lady of Ju State 莒国夫人
- Reign: 983 ‐ 989
- Born: 968; Changsha, Hunan
- Died: 989 (aged 20–21); Kaifeng, Henan
- Burial: Gongyi, Henan
- Spouse: Emperor Zhenzong of Song
Names
- Family name: Pān (潘)
Posthumous name
- Empress Zhānghuái (章懷皇后)
- Father: Pan Mei

Princess Pan (潘王妃; 968–989) was the first wife of the future Emperor Zhenzong of Song in imperial China's Song dynasty. They married in 984 when he was still the Prince of Han (韓王), and she was given the title "Lady of Ju" (莒国夫人). She died four years later. She was posthumously honoured as Empress Zhanghuai (章懷皇后), or Empress Zhangma, after her husband became the emperor in 998.

She was the second daughter and eighth child of the Song general Pan Mei.

== Titles ==
- During the reign of Emperor Taizu of Song (4 February 960– 14 November 976):
  - Lady Pan (潘氏; from 968)
- During the reign of Emperor Taizong of Song (15 November 976 – 8 May 997)
  - Lady of Ju State (莒国夫人; from 983)
- During the reign of Emperor Zhenzong of Song (8 May 997 – 23 March 1022)
  - Empress Zhanghuai (莊怀皇后/章懷皇后 from 997)
