= Yang Ye =

General served under Northern Han and Song dynasties

- 楊業
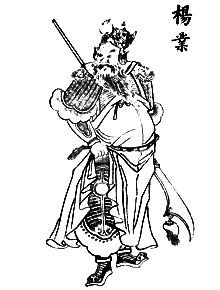
- From one 1892 print of the novel Legends of Generals of the Yang Family (楊家將傳) (Note: Essentially the same novel, with slight modifications by publishers and editors, as the second half of Records of the Two Songs, South and North (兩宋南北志傳) written by Xiong Damu (熊大木) in the late 16th century.)

Prefect of Daizhou Armed forces director of Sanjiao Garrison
- In office December 979 – August 986
- Monarch: Emperor Taizong of Song

Jiedushi of Jianxiong Command (建雄軍節度使)
- In office late 960s or 970s – 3 June 979
- Monarch: Emperor Yingwu of Northern Han

Personal details
- Born: Yang Chonggui; 920s or early 930s (Note: According to Song Shi, ch. 272, Yang became a follower of Liu Chong when he was just 20 in the East Asian age reckoning. Considering Liu's biography, this most likely happened between 947 and 953, although before 947 is also possible. The fact that he was adopted by Liu, born in 895, as a grandson rather than a son also gives clues about his age.) likely modern Shenmu County, Shaanxi
- Died: August 986 (Note: According to Liao Shi, ch. 11, the Liao imperial government received news of Yang's capture from general Yelü Xiezhen on 17 August 986. A more detailed message from Yelü Xiezhen, which mentioned Yang's death 3 days after his capture, was received on 1 September. Considering the distance of almost 900km between the battlefield near Shuozhou and the Liao capital of Shangjing, as well as the frequency of the communications, Yang's death most likely occurred in early- or mid-August, and definitely no later than 19 August.) near modern Shuozhou, Shanxi
- Spouse: Lady She (折氏) (alleged)
- Children: Yang Yanzhao, son; Yang Yanyu (楊延玉), son; Yang Yanpu (楊延浦), son; Yang Yanxun (楊延訓), son; Yang Yanhuan (楊延環), son; Yang Yangui (楊延貴), son; Yang Yanbin (楊延彬), son
- Parent: Yang Xin (楊信) (father)
- Full name: Surname: Yáng (楊), changed to Liú (劉) in the 950s, changed back to Yang in 979; Given name: Chóngguì (重貴), changed to Jìyè (繼業) in the 950s, changed to Yè (業) in 979 (Note: According to Xu Zizhi Tongjian Changbian, ch. 20, he changed his name directly from Liu Jiye to Yang Ye in 979, changing both the surname and the given name. If this is to be believed, the name Yang Jiye is technically incorrect, but shows up not only in the History of Liao, but also in a few Song documents including Ouyang Xiu's 1051 eulogy about a Yang family member.)
- Other names: Yang Jiye; Liu Jiye
- Nickname(s): "Invincible Yang" (楊無敵) "Commanding Lord Yang" (楊令公)

Yang Ye
- Traditional Chinese: 楊業
- Simplified Chinese: 杨业
Transcriptions
Standard Mandarin
- Hanyu Pinyin: Yáng Yè
- Wade–Giles: Yang^{2} Yeh^{4}
Yue: Cantonese
- Yale Romanization: Yeung^{4} Yip^{6}
- Jyutping: Joeng^{4} Jip^{6}

Yang Jiye
- Traditional Chinese: 楊繼業
- Simplified Chinese: 杨继业
Transcriptions
Standard Mandarin
- Hanyu Pinyin: Yáng Jìyè
- Wade–Giles: Yang^{2} Chi^{4}-yeh^{4}
Yue: Cantonese
- Yale Romanization: Yeung^{4} Gai^{3}-yip^{6}
- Jyutping: Joeng^{4} Gai^{3}-jip^{6}

Yang Ye (楊業) or Yang Jiye (楊繼業) (died August 986), named Liu Jiye (劉繼業) before 979 and Yang Chonggui (楊重貴) in his youth, was a Chinese military general of the Northern Han and the Northern Song dynasties.

While at Northern Han, he took on the surname "Liu", having been adopted by Northern Han's founding emperor Liu Chong as a grandson. (Note: Xu Zizhi Tongjian Changbian, ch. 9. He must have been adopted as a grandson since the new given name "Jiye" shared the same generation name "Ji" as Liu Chong's other grandsons Liu Ji'en and Liu Jiyuan.) After pledging allegiance to Emperor Taizong of Song, he was stationed at Song's northern border with the Khitan-ruled Liao dynasty, where, in 980, he played an instrumental role in expelling a major Liao invasion in Yanmen Pass.

== Early life ==
Yang Chonggui was born in a military family. Growing up, his father Yang Xin (楊信) was named the Linzhou (麟州; modern Shenmu County, Shaanxi) prefect (刺史) during the Later Han (947–951). At a young age, Yang Chonggui was a very good horse archer, always returning with several times more game than others on hunting trips. He used dogs and falcons to hunt and saw it as a way to prepare for a career commanding soldiers as a military general.

== Career under Northern Han ==
In his 20s, he joined warlord Liu Chong (Liu Min), quickly becoming a chief director of defense (保衛指揮使) after Liu established the Northern Han state in Jinyang (晉陽; modern Taiyuan, Shanxi) in 951. Yang showed enough gallantry in battles, some against the neighboring Khitan-ruled Liao dynasty, for the new ruler to bestow the youngster the name Liu Jiye so that they share the same surname.

In 968, Northern Han was attacked by the Song dynasty, and its 4th ruler Liu Jiyuan sought help from Liao, but Liu Jiye suggested attacking Liao's unsuspecting reinforcement to capture their horses: "The Khitans are greedy and untrustworthy, they will definitely invade our country one day." Liu Jiyuan refused the proposal, and eventually the Song forces withdrew.

Liu Jiye was already the Jianxiong Command (建雄軍) military governor when the Song forces invaded again in 979. With Emperor Taizong of Song personally leading the troops, Song forces quickly reached Jinyang. Liu Jiyuan came out to surrender, but Liu Jiye continued fighting and defending the capital city. Impressed by his bravery, Emperor Taizong ordered Liu Jiyuan to persuade him to surrender. Having received Liu Jiyuan's message, Liu Jiye cried and bowed to the north, then took off his armor to surrender. A pleased Emperor Taizong rewarded him very well, and he changed his name to Yang Ye.

== Career under Song ==
Knowing Yang Ye's experience in defending the same area from the Liao dynasty, Emperor Taizong named Yang prefect over Daizhou on the frontier and the armed force director (兵馬部署) of the neighboring Sanjiao (三交) military base. Previously Yang was also named a defense commissioner (防禦使). Yang was illiterate but knew military strategies well. He would join his soldiers in military exercises, enduring the same hardship as his inferiors. Winters were very frigid in the area, but Yang never asked anyone to start a fire for him as he handled military matters outdoors. His soldiers were very loyal to him.

In 980, the Liao invasion started with roughly 100,000 Liao soldiers arriving before Yanmen, a pass on the Great Wall in Dai Prefecture and a strategic choke point. After the arrival of Song army commander Pan Mei in Daizhou, Yang and a few hundred cavalrymen took a difficult route on the west, arriving at the north and back of the enemy. As Pan and Yang attacked from both directions, the Liao army suffered a catastrophic defeat: Liao general Li Chonghui (李重誨) was captured; while Emperor Jingzong of Liao's brother-in-law and military governor Xiao Chuoli (蕭啜裏) was killed. (Note: Xiao Duoli (蕭咄李) in the original source.) Song forces acquired countless horses, saddles, and armor.

Following this battle, the Liao army would "retreat immediately whenever they saw [Yang] Ye's flag", according to History of Song. Within two years of his surrender, Yang was promoted to the nominal post of surveillance commissioner (觀察使) of Yunzhou (雲州, modern Datong, Shanxi, then still under Liao control), while retaining his appointments in Daizhou and the Sanjiao military base. Several Song border generals became jealous. Some sent letters to Emperor Taizong listing Yang's shortcomings. Emperor Taizong allegedly forwarded the letters to Yang to show his trust.

== Death ==
In 986, the Song armies embarked on a large-scale northern campaign to take the Sixteen Prefectures from Liao. One of the three forces was led by Pan Mei, assisted by Yang Ye, along with military supervisors Wang Shen (王侁) and Liu Wenyu (劉文裕). In a little over a month, this force had already conquered 4 of the 16 prefectures, namely Huanzhou (寰州, part of modern Shuozhou, Shanxi), Shuozhou, Yingzhou (應州; modern Ying County, Shanxi) and Yunzhou, killing thousands of Liao soldiers. Yang Ye's son Yang Yanlang (Yang Yanzhao) was the vanguard general in the attacks of Shuozhou and Yingzhou. Elsewhere, Gao Hua (高化), a capable subordinate general whom Yang Ye valued and promoted, captured Liao general Dapengyi (大鵬翼).

However, another Song force on the east led by Cao Bin was destroyed by a Liao force led by Yelü Xiuge, and tens of thousands of Song soldiers perished. As the Liao force with over 100,000 soldiers marched westward, Pan and Yang Ye were in Daizhou and received orders to help the civilians of the four conquered prefectures retreat to Song territory. When Huanzhou fell to the Liao army, Yang told Pan, "Liao forces are strong and we must not fight them." He proposed a detailed plan to maximize the safety of the civilians from the 3 remaining prefectures. Per this plan, the Yunzhou civilians would leave first. The main Song force would advance from Daizhou to Yingzhou, drawing the main Liao force, thus allowing the Shuozhou civilians to leave and move to a valley called Shijiegu (石碣谷), which could be defended by a thousand soldiers with arrows. Finally a cavalry reinforcement would help the main Song force retrieve the Yingzhou civilians. The generals defending Shuozhou and Yunzhou would be notified of the plan to coordinate activities.

Wang Shen refuted his suggestion, jeering, "Such cowardice despite having tens of thousands of strong soldiers!" With the support of Liu Wenyu, he insisted that Yang immediately take his troops to take the enemy head-on. Yang reiterated his belief that such a move would bring defeat, which was met by Wang's rebuttal of "You sir have been called 'invincible', but today you are so hesitant in face of the enemy and reluctant to fight. Is your loyalty elsewhere?" Yang had no choice but to reply, "I am not evading death, but this is a bad situation which would make soldiers die and injure in vain. However, since you accuse me for fearing death, I will be the first (to die) before you all." He pointed at the end of a valley called Chenjiagu (陳家谷, in modern Shuozhou): "Gentlemen, please put infantrymen with arrows on both sides of that place, so that they could attack from both directions and provide assistance in case I retreat there. Otherwise, the situation could be dire." Pan and Wang agreed, and led their men to the place.

Liao general Yelü Xiezhen heard of Yang's arrival and set up an ambush. Yang engaged the Liao force in a bloody battle and fought from noon to dusk until he indeed retreated to the end of Chenjiagu, but no Song soldier was there, as Pan and Wang had already left. As the enemy closed in, Yang Ye's son Yang Yanyu (楊延玉) was killed, as was a 72-year-old subordinate Wang Gui (王貴) who continued fighting with his fists after exhausting all arrows. Seeing only around a hundred soldiers around him, Yang Ye told them, "You all have fathers, mothers, wives and children, no point in dying together with me. Return home and serve the emperor later." His men all cried, but nobody left.

Liao soldiers were instructed to capture Yang alive. Even with several dozen wounds on him, Yang fought on, killing about a hundred enemy soldiers by himself. He was captured when his horse was gravely wounded by an arrow from Liao general Yelü Xidi. Yelü Xiezhen yelled, "You have been fighting with our country for over 30 years. What do you have to say today!" To which Yang replied, "I deserve the death sentence." He allegedly sighed and said, "The emperor has treated me so kindly, expecting me to conquer the enemy and defend the borders in return. However, due to persecutions from treacherous officials, the royal troops have been defeated. How can I live on?" he killed himself by smashing his head.

As expected Yunzhou, Yingzhou and other prefectures were recaptured by the Liao army, but according to History of Liao, it was because Song generals "abandoned the cities and fled when they heard of (Yang) Jiye's death".

== Aftermath ==
Yang Ye's severed head was presented to the young Emperor Shengzong of Liao and his mother Empress Dowager Xiao Yanyan. This was such a great victory for the Liao, where Buddhism was the state religion, that Kailong Temple (開龍寺) in the capital Shangjing (上京, in today's Baarin Left Banner) conducted religious activities for a month and provided food for over 10,000 monks.

In the Song dynasty, the Yang family was initially compensated only 100 rolls of silk, 100 rolls of textile and 10 stones of rice for Yang Ye's death. In comparison, the family of a lesser general He Huaipu (賀懷浦) who also died in the same battle was compensated 100 rolls of silk, 100 strings of coins, 20 bottles of wine, and 15 sheep, indicating possible scapegoating against Yang. What exactly happened afterwards is unclear, but a few months later Emperor Taizong proclaimed the following edict:

... Yang Ye, the Yunzhou surveillance commissioner, has a heart strong like gold and stone and a character intrepid like wind and clouds. A great talent from Shanxi in the west, he had many victories since his commission. He was given an army of brave soldiers and served at the borders. But all other commanders broke their promises and did not send reinforcement. Left in the desert, he and his lone army fought heroically until death and will not return. Who in history could match that! A special ceremony shall be held to commemorate his loyalty. His soul in heaven will understand my deep condolences. He shall be honored as a grand commandant (太尉) and the military governor of the Datong Command (大同軍), and his family awarded 1,000 rolls of textile and silk and 1,000 stones of rice. Grand general Pan Mei shall be demoted by three ranks; military supervisor Wang Shen shall be stripped of all positions and exiled to Jinzhou (金州); and Liu Wenyu shall be stripped of all positions and exiled to Dengzhou (登州).

Yang Ye's six surviving sons were also given official appointments, especially Yang Yanzhao, who would become a prominent general himself.

== Invincible Yang Temple ==
Liao dynasty had built an "Invincible Yang Temple" in Gubeikou shortly after his death. Its earliest mention was a 1055 poem "Passing Gubeikou's Invincible Yang Temple" (過古北口楊無敵廟) by Song politician Liu Chang (劉敞), who went to Liao on a mission that year. In a 1089 poem, "Gubeikou's Invincible Yang Temple" (古北口楊無敵廟), Su Zhe who was also visiting Liao, compared Yang to the Jin dynasty (266–420) general Zhou Chu who was similarly persecuted by his superior.

This temple still stands today in Gubeikou, Miyun County, Beijing.

== In fiction ==
Yang Ye
- The Generals of the Yang Family character

In-universe information
- Alias: Yang Jiye
- Nicknames: Yang Linggong (楊令公; "Commander Lord Yang") "Invincible Yang"
- Spouse: She Saihua
- Children: Yang Yanping, 1st son; Yang Yanding, 2nd son; Yang Yan'an, 3rd son; Yang Yanhui, 4th son; Yang Yande, 5th son; Yang Yanzhao, 6th son; Yang Yansi, 7th son; 2 daughters

In the popular The Generals of the Yang Family legends, Yang Ye married She Saihua, a woman skilled in martial arts and archery. In most versions, his weapon is a poled golden glaive. The older Yang Ye is usually called Yang Linggong (楊令公, literally "Commander Lord Yang").

During the battle of Mount Twin Wolves, he was surrounded by enemies. His eldest three sons had already died and his fourth and fifth sons were missing. His sixth son Yang Yanzhao asked the seventh son to seek aid while he tried to fight a way out for the father. Feeling hopeless, Yang Ye saw in a distance a headstone on the ground. The name on it was Li Ling, a famous Han dynasty general who in 99BC was forced to lead an army of 5,000 to attack the 80,000-men strong Xiongnu army from the north. Fighting valiantly for over 10 days and killing over 10,000 Xiongnu soldiers, Li received no reinforcement and defected to his enemy in the end, resulting in the execution of his entire family back home. Refusing to become another Li Ling, Yang Ye decided to commit suicide by ramming his head on the stele.

The Water Margin character, Yang Zhi, is stated to be one of Yang Ye's descendants, and Yang Ye is mentioned to have been one of the many generations to have wielded Yang Zhi's legendary sabre.

== Sources ==
- (in Chinese) Toqto'a; et al., eds. (1344). Liao Shi (遼史) [History of Liao].
- (in Chinese) Xu Song, comps.; et al. (1809). Song Huiyao Jigao (宋會要輯稿) [Song Manuscript Compendium].
- (in Chinese) Toqto'a; et al., eds. (1345). Song Shi (宋史) [History of Song].
- (in Chinese) Li Tao (1183). Xu Zizhi Tongjian Changbian (續資治通鑑長編) [Extended Continuation to Zizhi Tongjian].
