= Pan Mei =

General served under the Song dynasty

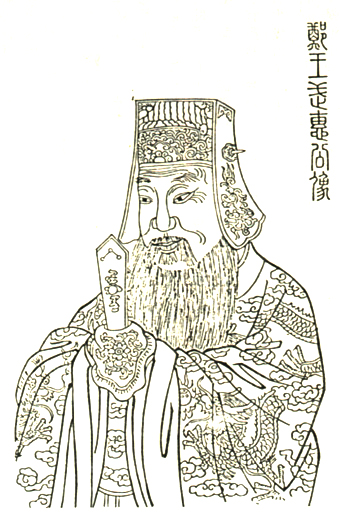
- from an 1887 Pan family genealogy book

Zhongwu Command military governor
- Monarch: Emperor Taizong of Song

Personal details
- Born: 925 or early 926 likely modern Daming County, Hebei
- Died: 20 July 991 (aged 65–66) modern Taiyuan, Shanxi
- Children: Pan Weide (潘惟德), son; Pan Weigu (潘惟固), son; Pan Weiqing (潘惟清), son; Pan Weixi (潘惟熙), son; Daughter (m. Zhang Zhaoyun); Princess Pan; Daughter (m. Cao Wei)
- Father: Pan Lin (潘璘)
- Full name: Surname: Pān (潘); Given name: Měi (美); Courtesy name: Zhòngxún (仲詢); Posthumous name: Wǔhuì (武惠)

Pan Mei
- Chinese: 潘美
Transcriptions
Standard Mandarin
- Hanyu Pinyin: Pān Měi
Yue: Cantonese
- Jyutping: Pun^{1} Mei^{5}

Pan Mei (潘美) (c. 925 – 20 July 991) was a military general and statesman in the early years of imperial China's Song dynasty. In the 970s, he was the main commander in Song's conquest of Southern Han and also played pivotal roles in the conquest of Southern Tang and Northern Han. Afterwards he fought the Khitan-ruled Liao dynasty on Song's northern border.

In 986 he was demoted by 3 ranks for contributing to the death of fellow Song general Yang Ye during battles against Liao. At this time one of his daughters had married into the imperial House of Zhao. The antagonist Pan Renmei (潘仁美, also known as Pan Hong 潘洪) in the largely fictional Generals of the Yang Family legends is based on Pan Mei from this episode.

== Early life ==
Pan Mei's father Pan Lin (潘璘) was a local militia captain (軍校) in Changshan (常山, around modern Shijiazhuang, Hebei). In his 20s, Pan Mei worked as an usher (典謁) at his hometown of Daming (in modern Hebei) during the Later Han (947–951), and often told his close friend Wang Mi (王密) about his ambitions in taking advantage of the turbulent times for fame and riches.

== Career under Later Zhou ==
After the establishment of Later Zhou in 951, Pan Mei served Chai Rong, the prefect (府尹) of Kaifeng. When Chai became the emperor in 954, Pan was named a court official. He followed Chai on campaigns against the Northern Han kingdom, and after playing a part in the victory at Gaoping, served in the palace commissions. Later he became the military inspector of an expeditionary army preparing to invade the Later Shu kingdom.

== Pacifying Yuan Yan ==
In 960, general Zhao Kuangyin overthrew Later Zhou to found the Song dynasty. As a former friend, Pan was given important tasks by the new emperor and he did not disappoint. First, Pan persuaded military governor Yuan Yan to submit to Song, then supervised the armies in quelling Li Chongjin's revolt in Huainan. Staying behind in Yangzhou after the victory, he was later sent to Qinzhou (秦州, in today's Qin'an County, Gansu) where he became the imperial commissioner of the local militia.

== Conquest of Southern Han ==
In 963, Pan Mei was named the imperial defense commissioner of Tanzhou (today's Changsha) and sent to Hunan to help control the newly conquered province, which borders the Southern Han kingdom to the south. During the next 7 years, Pan pacified rebellious tribes in the southern half of the province and fought off Southern Han incursions in Guiyang and Jianghua.

In 970, Pan was named the commander of the expeditionary force to invade Southern Han. In Fuchuan, he defeated the 10,000-men strong Southern Han army and subsequently took Hezhou. Quickly the Song army conquered Zhaozhou (昭州, in today's Pingle County), Guizhou (桂州, today's Guilin) and Lianzhou, resulting in the surrender of other prefecture leaders along the Xi River.

Pan Mei's forces killed more than 10,000 enemy soldiers in Shaozhou (韶州, today's Shaoguan) to advance to 120 li north of Guangzhou, Southern Han's capital. Around 150,000 Southern Han soldiers were stationed on a hill for a last battle. Pan Mei rested his soldiers and mentioned to his subordinate generals that the enemy's bamboo fences could best be attacked by fire. On a windy night, he dispatched a few thousand brave men to the enemy's gate, each with 2 torches in hands. Soon great flames engulfed the camps, and as the Song forces attacked from both sides, tens of thousands of Southern Han soldiers perished. The Southern Han ruler Liu Chang was captured in Guangzhou, and the invasion ended 5 months after it began.

Pan would remain to pacify the Lingnan territory for three years as the joint prefect of Guangzhou and commissioner of foreign trade.

== Conquest of Southern Tang ==
In 974, Pan Mei led his troops north to Jiangling during the fresh campaign against the Southern Tang kingdom. One month later, he was named the military inspector of the troops under the overall command of Cao Bin and ordered to advance to Qinhuai. Reaching the Yangtze River, Pan Mei did not want to wait for boats to be built. Instead he motivated his troops by saying, "His majesty gave me tens of thousands of brave men, expecting victories. Are we going to let this narrow water deter us?" His men swam across the river and destroyed the enemy.

After this victory, Pan Mei was rewarded and became a commissioner of palace attendants (宣徽北院使).

== Death of Yang Ye ==
In 986, Emperor Taizong of Song ordered a new invasion to retake the Sixteen Prefectures from the Liao dynasty. The campaign was known as "Yongxi Campaign" under the era name of Taizong. Three armies participate the campaign, led by Pan Mei, Yang Ye and Cao Bin. Pan Mei command one of the three armies sent northward.

Initially, the expedition scored major victories over Liao forces. However, from time to time, miscommunications, misunderstanding between the generals and the failure of Cao Bin led Pan Mei and Yang Ye into disastrous situations. In a failed attempt to thwart an attack from Liao troops, Yang Ye was surrounded without reinforcement from Pan Mei. His sons died one by one, with only his sixth son Yang Yanzhao surviving. Eventually, Yang Ye was captured and died three days later.

Following the death of Yang Ye, Liao gained the upper hand in the conflict. The Song forces were pursued all the way to Bianjing, which was successfully held by the Taizong emperor.

Angered and furious by the death of Yang Ye, a few of Song's military officials were executed, others being thrown into exile. Pan Mei was demoted three ranks.

== Sources ==
Primary sources

- (in Chinese) Toqto'a; et al., eds. (1345). Song Shi (宋史) [History of Song].
- (in Chinese) Li Tao (1183). Xu Zizhi Tongjian Changbian (續資治通鑑長編) [Extended Continuation to Zizhi Tongjian].

Secondary source

- Wang Gungwu (1976). "P'an Mei". In Franke, Herbert (ed.). Sung Biographies. Franz Steiner Verlag. pp. 818–821. ISBN 3515024123.
