= Yang Yanzhao =

Famous general of the Song dynasty

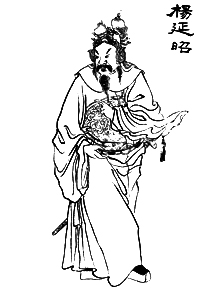
- from one 1892 print of the novel Legends of Generals of the Yang Family (楊家將傳)

Personal details
- Born: 958 likely modern Taiyuan, Shanxi
- Died: 9 February 1014 (aged 56) modern Baoding, Hebei
- Children: Yang Chuanyong (楊傳永), son; Yang Dezheng (楊德政), son; Yang Wenguang, son
- Father: Yang Ye
- Full name: Surname: Liú (劉), changed to Yáng (楊), his father's original surname, in 979 with his father Given name: Yánlǎng (延朗), changed to Yánzhāo (延昭) in 1012
- Nickname: "Yang's 6th son" (楊六郎)

Yang Yanzhao
- Traditional Chinese: 楊延昭
- Simplified Chinese: 杨延昭
Transcriptions
Standard Mandarin
- Hanyu Pinyin: Yáng Yánzhāo
- Wade–Giles: Yang^{2} Yen^{2}-chao^{1}
Yue: Cantonese
- Yale Romanization: Yeung^{4} Yin^{4}-chiu^{1}
- Jyutping: Joeng^{4} Jin^{4}-ciu^{1}

Yang Yanzhao (楊延昭; c. 958 – 9 February 1014), named Yang Yanlang (楊延朗) before 1012, was a military general in ancient China's Northern Song dynasty. For over two decades he defended Song's northern border against the Khitan-ruled Liao dynasty, helping Song thwart Liao's repeated invasion attempts between 999 and 1004.

He was one of Yang Ye's seven sons. History of Song mentions that he was called Yang Liulang (楊六郎, literally "Yang's 6th son") by the Khitans who feared him. In the largely fictional legends of Generals of the Yang Family, Yang Yanzhao is Yang Ye's sixth eldest son to explain this nickname, even though historians believe he was actually the eldest or second eldest son.

== Early career ==
Yang Yanzhao's given name was originally Yanlang (延朗). As a child, he was quiet but enjoyed playing military strategy games. His father Yang Ye (then still called Liu Jiye), a distinguished general, had commented that Yanlang resembled him, and would bring him along on military campaigns.

In 986, the Song dynasty armies embarked on a large-scale northern campaign to take the Sixteen Prefectures from Khitan-ruled Liao dynasty. Yang was the vanguard general of his father Yang Ye's troops during the attacks on the prefectures Yingzhou and Shuozhou. He fought on despite an arrow piercing his arm in the attacks of Shuozhou. After his father's death, he was named a vice-commissioner of honor ceremony (崇儀副使) and sent to Jingzhou. In the years that followed, he had a stint in Huainan to oversee the recovery from floods in Yangtze River and Huai River, eventually becoming the metro inspection commissioner (都巡檢使) of the Baozhou area on the Song border, where he would remain for the rest of his life.

At the border, Yang continued his father's tradition of instilling strong discipline in his troops by setting good examples. He had few servants and associates for his position and would endure the same hardship as his soldiers. He befriended Yang Si (楊嗣), another brave general at the border, and commoners would gradually call the duo the "two Yangs".

== War against Liao ==
In the winter of 999, Yang was guarding the small city of Suicheng (遂城, still in today's Xushui County) when the invading Liao army laid siege and attacked it continuously. Xiao Chuo, Liao's charismatic empress dowager, personally oversaw the attacks. With little resources in the city, Yang's outnumbered soldiers became more frightened by day. Yang quickly recruited fit men from the city's population to strengthen the troops defending the city, providing them with weapons and armor. He also ordered his men to pour water on the outside of the city's defensive walls. Since the temperature was freezing, water quickly turned into ice, making Liao's attempt to climb the city walls impossible. Finally the Liao forces had no choice but to retreat, and Yang chased after them and obtained much armor.

News of the victory was initially not reported to Emperor Zhenzong of Song by Fu Qian (傅潛), the regional military commissioner in charge of 80,000 soldiers. For fear of suffering a defeat, Fu Qian had tried hard to avoid confronting the invading Liao army. Previously, when the "two Yangs" and other generals repeatedly requested for soldiers and orders to attack, Fu always scolded them rudely. Once Emperor Zhenzong found out, he removed Fu from the post and summoned Yang Yanlang. Yang described the situation at the border and answered all questions to the emperor's satisfaction. Impressed, Emperor Zhenzong told several princes, "Yanlang's father had been a famous general for the previous emperor. Yanlang now defends the border and commands his army just like his father. It is highly commendable." Yang was appointed the regional inspector (刺史) of Mozhou (莫州, today's Maozhou) and given many awards. As always, instead of bringing the gifts back to his family, he distributed it among his soldiers.

When the Liao forces invaded again in the winter, Yang fought them on but kept on retreating, finally luring his enemy to the west of a mountainous place called Yangshan (羊山, in today's Xushui County), where he had set up an ambush. The Liao force was annihilated and Yang presented the severed head of a Liao general to Emperor Zhenzong. Together with Yang Si, Yang Yanlang was promoted to become a military training commissioner (團練使) in 1001. Speaking to his ministers, Emperor Zhengzong characterized the "two Yangs" as loyal and brave, adding, "Many in the imperial court are jealous of them, but I will defend them with (my) power." When in 1002, the "two Yangs" were attacked on the way to reinforce the besieged Baozhou and lost many of soldiers, Emperor Zhenzong pardoned them, saying, "(Their) bravery is renowned, (I) will just watch their future accomplishments."

In 1004, the Liao dynasty initiated a major invasion to the south, and came to a standstill with the Song forces in Chanzhou (in today's Puyang). Emperor Zhenzong came to the frontier and strongly boosted the morale of Song soldiers. Liao decided to negotiate a peace treaty, but Yang Yanzhao voiced his strong opinion against it, saying "as the Khitans (Liao) are at a standstill in Chanzhou, thousands of li away from their home in the north, their soldiers and horses are very tired. Despite their large numbers they could be easily defeated now." However Emperor Zhenzong eventually decided for a peace treaty, known as the Chanyuan Treaty, which specified that Song must pay annual tributes to Liao. To voice his protest, Yang Yanzhao fought a last battle during Liao's retreat and killed and captured countless Liao soldiers.

== Later years ==
According to History of Song, Yang Yanzhao was an intelligent and brave general who commanded a disciplined army for several decades on the frontier. Any reward he received he shared with his soldiers, never bringing anything home. During battles he would fight the enemies with his soldiers on the battleground, while he often attributed victories to his subordinates, therefore his soldiers were very loyal to him. When he died at the age of 56, Emperor Zhenzong was very saddened and ordered a special envoy to bring his coffin home. Many people along the way wept when they saw his coffin.

His 3 surviving sons, Yang Chuanyong (楊傳永), Yang Dezheng (楊德政), Yang Wenguang all became officials.

== In fiction ==
In Generals of the Yang Family, Yang Yanzhao is the sixth son of Yang Ye and She Saihua. He was the only son who returned from the battlefield to the family after the defeat in Golden Beach. In the stories he is also referred to as Yang Jing (楊景).

In the stories, he married Princess Chai, a descendant of Emperor Shizong of Later Zhou. Like others in the Chai family, Princess Chai holds a death-exemption certificate from Emperor Taizu of Song. Their son Yang Zongbao also became a Song general.

== Sources ==
- (in Chinese) Toqto'a; et al. (1344). Liao Shi (遼史) [History of Liao].
- (in Chinese) Zeng Gong (c. 1200s) [11th century]. Longping Ji (隆平集) [Collection of Long Ping].
- (in Chinese) Toqto'a; et al. (1346). Song Shi (宋史) [History of Song].
- (in Chinese) Li Tao (1183). Xu Zizhi Tongjian Changbian (續資治通鑑長編) [Extended Continuation to Zizhi Tongjian].
