= Chang Mei-chun =

Korean-born Taiwanese film director (1944–1985)

Chang Mei-chun (Chinese: 張美君; 1944 – 22 November 1985) was a Korean-born Taiwanese film director. He adapted the works of writers Chiung Yao and Wang Zhenhe to film, and was known for completing films quickly. He directed Taiwan's first 3D film, as well as the first film in Taiwan to feature underwater photography.

== Career ==
Chang was of Chinese descent, born in Keijō, Korea, then under Japanese rule. He was a classmate of Liu Chia-chang while both resided in what became South Korea. Upon graduating from high school, Chang moved to Taiwan to study fine arts at what became National Taiwan Normal University.

Liu founded a film company and invited Chang to work as a director, although Chang had just completed his degree and had no formal education or training in film. His debut film was released in 1967 and won an outstanding film award at a film festival in Cambodia. Chang worked on a few art films while employed by Liu, then left by 1968 and began working on his first martial arts film.

Throughout the 1970s, Chang worked with Lin Huang-kun on art films starring Brigitte Lin. Chang also directed films based on the works of Chiung Yao, including The Unforgettable Character (1975). During this period, Chang was considered one of the "Four Great Young Directors", alongside Wang Shih-cheng, Lee Jung-chih, and Tu Chung-hsun. His films were completed and released quickly, which led to criticisms of inconsistency. He described the pace of his work as an attempt to meet the demands of the film market. His film Tian Lun Le was shortlisted for the Best Feature Film at the 11th Golden Horse Awards. With the release of Killer Clans (1976), Taiwan was enveloped in a martial arts film craze. Chang took advantage and released the first 3D film made in Taiwan, which also was a martial arts film. Chang shot his 3D martial arts film in 1976. Its theatrical release was timed for Chinese New Year in 1977, which helped drive the popularity of Taipei Cinema in Ximending. He also shot a second 3D film. Because Taiwanese audiences were not familiar with the technology, Chang's film company decided to stop funding 3D projects. In 1978, Chang shot the first Taiwanese film to feature underwater photography.

In 1981, Chang founded Silver Bullet Film Company. Despite knowing that the domestic film market was slumping, he chose to begin working with 70mm film, which was more expensive. This decision caused his company to lose approximately NT$7 million. He joined a newly established film company by 1983, and received praise for his matured filmmaking style. Driven by financial pressures, he later joined another company, where he completed two films in just over one year, including an adaption of the novel Rose, Rose, I Love You written by Wang Zhenhe. While filming The Kung-Fu Kids on Lishan in October 1985, Chang fell ill. In the following weeks, he was diagnosed with liver cancer, and sent to Chung Shan Hospital in Taipei for treatment, where he died on 22 November 1985. His career ended with 25 completed films. Kevin Chu completed work on The Kung-Fu Kids, which was released in 1986.

== Personal life ==
At the time of his death, Chang had a seven-year old son. In life, he was known for his warm but introverted personality. In July 1970, when Liu Chia-chang suspected his wife Chiang Ching of infidelity with Li Han-hsiang, Chang convinced Liu not to confront Li.
