= Small Town Story =

Small Town Story or Story of a Small Town may refer to:

- Small Town Story (film), 1953
- Small Town Stories, a 1995 jazz album by Unified Jazz Ensemble, led by Jeff Antoniuk
- Small Town Stories, a 2009 album by A Death in the Family, released by Resist Records
- The Story of a Small Town, a 1978 Taiwanese film
  - Small Town Story (album), a 1979 album (partial soundtrack) by Teresa Teng
    - "Small Town Story" (song), a song first sung by Teresa Teng in 1978, also called "Story of a Small Town"
