= 13th Golden Horse Awards =

1976 Taiwanese film awards ceremony

- Date: October 30, 1976
- Site: Zhongshan Hall, Taipei, Taiwan
- Hosted by: Ting Mao-shih
- Organized by: Taipei Golden Horse Film Festival Executive Committee

Highlights
- Best Feature Film: Victory
- Best Director: Chang Pei-cheng; The Venturer
- Best Actor: Chang Feng; Fragrant Flower Versus Noxious Grass
- Best Actress: Hsu Feng; Assassin

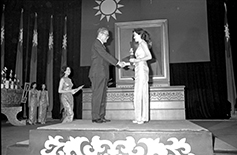
"Plum Blossom" won the 13th Golden Horse Award for Best Feature Film

The 13th Golden Horse Awards (Mandarin:第13屆金馬獎) took place on October 30, 1976 at Zhongshan Hall in Taipei, Taiwan.

== Winners and nominees ==
Winners are listed first, highlighted in boldface.

**Best Feature Film**: **Victory**; Di Di Xue Lei Di Di Qing (runner-up); Posterity and Perplexity (runner-up); The Venturer (runner-up); 7-Man Army (runner-up); Assassin (runner-up)	**Best Documentary**: **Qing Zhu Zhong Hua Min Guo Liu Shi Si Nian Guo Qing Yue Bing Da Dian**; Retrocession Day (runner-up); Along the River During the Qingming Festival (runner-up); Shi Xiang Jian She (runner-up); Old Train in Alishan (runner-up)
**Best Director**: **Chang Pei-cheng — The Venturer**	**Best Leading Actor**: **Chang Feng — Fragrant Flower Versus Noxious Grass**
**Best Leading Actress**: **Hsu Feng — Assassin**	**Best Supporting Actor**: **Sihung Lung — The Venturer**
**Best Supporting Actress**: **Sylvia Chang — Posterity and Perplexity**	**Best Screenplay**: **Teng Yu-kun — Victory**
**Best Cinematography - Color**: **Lin Tsan-ting — Victory**	**Best Film Editing**: **Peter Cheung — The Himalayan**
**Best Art Direction - Color**: **Wang Toon — Forever My Love**	**Best Music**: **Liu Chia-chang — Victory**
**Best Sound Recording**: **Hsin Chiang-sheng — Victory**	**Best Cinematography for Documentary**: **Qing Zhu Zhong Hua Min Guo Liu Shi Si Nian Guo Qing Yue Bing Da Dian**
**Best Planning for Documentary**: **Liu Yi — Along the River During the Qingming Festival**	**National Spirit Award**: **Eight Hundred Heroes**
**Contemporary Film Award**: **Fragrant Flower Versus Noxious Grass**
