= Tu Chung-hsun =

Taiwanese film director (1936–1980)

Tu Chung-hsun (Chinese: 屠忠訓; 18 September 1936 – 19 July 1980) was a Taiwanese film director.

== Early life and career ==
Tu Chung-hsun was the only son of Government Information Office employee Tu Yi-fang. In 1960, Tu Chung-hsun graduated from Soochow University, and was conscripted into the Republic of China Armed Forces. In May of the following year, the elder Tu was promoted to a division directorship within the GIO. Tu Chung-hsun worked for the GIO for five years following the end of his military service, and developed an interest in film production.

When Tu was 29, he married the 18 year-old Feng Ho-hua. His father helped Tu find a job at Union Film Company, through which he was introduced to King Hu and assisted in the production of Dragon Inn and A Touch of Zen. Tu also worked for Taiwan Television. In 1969, Tu was promoted at the Union Film Company, becoming a film director. At Union, Tu and Hu Po-ping co-wrote a war film, City Called Dragon, alternately titled Ten Days in Dragon City. Set during the Jin–Song wars, it was released on 20 November 1970, and won Hsu Feng Best New Actress at the 9th Golden Horse Awards. Throughout the 1970s, Tu directed several more films, and became known as one of the "four great young directors" alongside Chang Mei-chun, Wang Shih-cheng, and Lee Jung-chih.

== A Special Smile ==
Tu planned an adaptation of Gu Long's novel The Blood Parrot, but the government withheld its approval of the script for some time. After the script was approved, work on the film was further delayed by the Government Information Office because the author of the source material was Gu Long. As a result, film producers avoided working with Tu.

Seeking to break the deadlock, Tu pivoted from the Gu Long project to a romance film, A Special Smile. Sung Hsiang-yu contributed to the script, Li Tai-hsiang composed the film score, and Li's protege Chyi Yu sang the film's theme song. On 27 July 1978, Tu began shooting the film in Taipei for the Hong Kong-based Guangyi Film Company with Chang Kuo-chu and Sibelle Hu in lead roles. Hu later recalled that Tu and his wife were very encouraging and often took her to theatres, where she learned acting by watching other films. In February 1979, a run of 200,000 copies of the theme song as performed by Chyi Yu sold out in ten days.

Tu struggled to promote the film until Hsuan Hsiao-fo convinced Wang Ying-hsiang to help distribute it. An agreement was struck in March 1979 for a release date two months later and half of the film's revenue going to Wang. The film significantly improved the name recognition of Hu and Tu, and raised the profile of several other cast members. Tu was shortlisted for Best Director in the 16th Golden Horse Awards.

On 4 May 1980, Tu Chung-hsun shared the third Chung-Hsin Literary Award with Tuan Tsai-hua, Kuo-ch'ing Tu, Lu Chuan-sheng, Yen Kun-yang, among others.

== Later career and death ==
Tu also struggled to distribute his next complete film, and halted another project in production. Instead, he reached an agreement with Golden Harvest Entertainment to produce four other films. However, before he could deliver on the terms of the contract, Tu died. At around 5 p.m. on 14 July 1980, Tu was struck by a motorcycle on Taipei's Renai Circle. He was transferred between three medical facilities before one that could handle concussion-related protocols, the Central Clinic, was found. Sibelle Hu visited Tu in hospital upon her return from Kuala Lumpur, and contributed NT$200,000 to cover medical expenses. In the coming days, Raymond Chow, King Hu, Li Hsing, James Soong, and others also visited Tu.

Tu succumbed to his injuries on 19 July 1980, dying at 5:58 am. On 28 July, the Tu family announced that they would not press charges on the motorcycle operator. A cousin of Tu's had previously invoked Tu's kindness and good nature in stating that they did not blame the motorcyclist for the accident. On 3 August 1980, Tu Chung-hsun was buried at a cemetery in Nangang District, Taipei.

== Legacy ==
For seven days after Tu was laid to rest, the Blossom Theatre in Taipei screened his films. The proceeds were placed into an education fund for his daughters. His eldest daughter modeled for the Tonlin Department Store, and his younger daughter pursued acting.

In 2023, Tu's 1970 film starring Hsu Feng was shown at Metrograph in New York.
