= Qian yan wan yu =

Qian yan wan yu may refer to:

- "Qian yan wan yu", a 1973 song sung by Teresa Teng in The Young Ones (1973 film)
- Ordinary Heroes (1999 film), 1999
