= Meinong =

Meinong may refer to:

- Alexius Meinong (1853–1920), Austrian philosopher
- Meinong District, a Hakka district in Kaohsiung, Taiwan
