= The Plum Blossom =

Patriotic song of the Republic of China (Taiwan)

"The Plum Blossom" (Chinese: 梅花; pinyin: méi huā) is a patriotic song of the Republic of China (Taiwan) written for the 1976 Taiwanese film Victory (梅花) by its director Liu Chia-chang (劉家昌). Chiang Wei-kuo soon rearranged it into "The Plum Blossom March" (梅花進行曲).

The plum blossom was adopted as the National Flower of the Republic of China on July 21, 1964. The song likens the resilience of the Chinese people to that of the plum blossom, a message that was especially salient during the political conditions of the 1960s. The blossom is a symbol of resilience in the face of adversity, has three stamens symbolizing Sun Yat-sen's Three Principles of the People, and five petals, which represent the five branches of the government.
