= Small Town Story (song) =

1979 single by Teresa Teng

Single by Teresa Teng

from the album Love Songs of Island, Vol. 6: Small Town Story
- Released: March 23, 1979
- Recorded: 1978
- Genre: Mandopop
- Length: 2:36
- Label: Kolin; Polydor
- Composer: Weng Ching-hsi
- Lyricist: Zhuang Nu

Audio
- "Xiao Cheng Gu Shi" (小城故事) on YouTube

"Small Town Story" (Chinese: 小城故事; pinyin: Xiǎochéng Gùshì) is a song recorded by Taiwanese singer Teresa Teng. It was officially released for her Mandarin studio album Love Songs of Island, Vol. 6: Small Town Story, which was released through Polydor Records on March 23, 1979.

== Background ==
"Small Town Story" was released for Teng's studio album Love Songs of Island, Vol. 6: Small Town Story on March 23, 1979. It is two minutes and 36 seconds long. Teng first recorded it for the 1978 Taiwanese film The Story of a Small Town, directed by Li Hsing. The film was well received in Taiwan and won Best Feature Film at the 16th Golden Horse Awards.

CTWant described "Small Town Story" as "ditty" and "full of national color, expressing the hardworking, hospitable and optimistic nature of Taiwanese people." The publication added that "through Teresa Teng's gentle and sincere interpretation, the spirit of the song is brought out to its fullest, unparalleled potential".

== Live performances ==
"Small Town Story" helped Teng attract an international following. She performed the song at the Los Angeles Music Center in 1980 when she became the first Taiwanese singer to perform at the venue. She also performed it during her Teresa Teng Hong Kong Queen Elizabeth Concert in 1982 and 15th Anniversary Concert Tour in Hong Kong in 1983.

== Legacy ==
"Small Town Story" became popular in mainland China after the Cultural Revolution. It is one of Teng's most famous songs and has been covered by Asian musicians into the 21st century. The song was sampled by Chinese singer-songwriter Cui Jian on his song "Little Town Story V21-Part 1".
