= Jiang Qing (disambiguation) =

Jiang Qing (1914–1991), also known as Madame Mao, was a Chinese political figure and the fourth wife of Mao Zedong.

Jiang Qing or Chiang Ching may also refer to:

- Chiang Ching (dancer) (born 1946), Chinese-American dancer and film actress
- Jiang Qing (Confucian) (born 1953), Chinese Confucian scholar

== See also ==
- Chiang Ching-kuo, president of Taiwan from 1978 to 1988
- Jiang Qin, military general during the Eastern Han dynasty
