= Chung Li-ho =

Chinese novelist

- 鍾理和
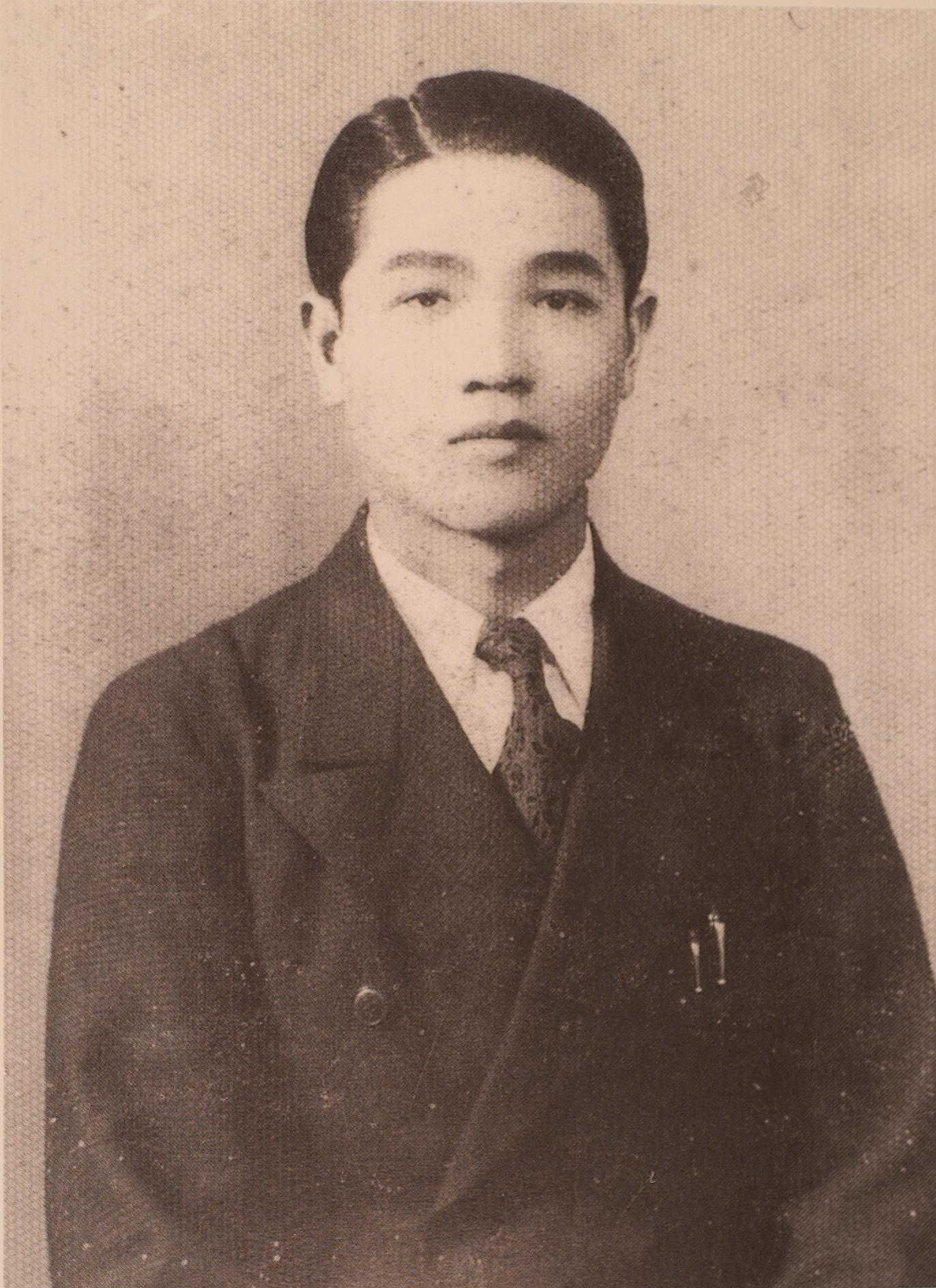
- Born: 6 November 1915; Gaoshu, Takao, Taiwan, Empire of Japan
- Died: 4 August 1960 (aged 44)
- Occupation: Novelist

Chung Li-ho (Chinese: 鍾理和 (pinyin Zhong Lihe), Hakka transliteration: Chûng Lî-fò or Tsûng Li-fô) December 15, 1915 – August 4, 1960, was a writer from Taiwan famous mainly for fiction. He was a Liudui Hakka (Chinese: 六堆客家人), born in Gaoshu Township, Pingtung in 1915, who moved with his parents to a newly purchased fruit and coffee plantation in Meinong in around 1932. Eloping with a woman because their same-surname relationship was taboo in their community, he resided in Japanese-occupied China – Shenyang and Beijing – between 1938 and 1946. He died of pulmonary tuberculosis at the age of 44 in Meinong whilst revising his last and possibly finest work, a novella entitled "Rain" (Chinese: 雨).

== Legacy ==
There is a Chung Li-ho Museum, located in Meinong, Kaohsiung is dedicated to Chung. His life has been dramatized as China, My Native Land, a 1980 film directed by Li Hsing, featuring theme and other songs by Teresa Teng. Chung's eldest son, Chung Tieh-min, was an award-winning writer of fiction and prose. The asteroid 237187 Zhonglihe, discovered by Xiangyao Hsiao and Ye Quan-Zhi at Lulin Observatory in 2008, was named in his memory. The official naming citation was published by the Minor Planet Center on 12 October 2011 (M.P.C. 76677).

== See also ==
- Chung Li-ho Museum
- Literary Friends Communications
