= The Story of a Small Town =

1979 Taiwanese film directed by Li Hsing

- Theatrical poster
- Directed by: Li Hsing
- Screenplay by: Chang Yung-hsiang
- Story by: Liu Teng-shan
- Produced by: Chen Ru-lin; Li Hsing
- Starring: Kenny Bee; Joan Lin; Ko Hsiang-ting; Lee Lieh; Chen Jun-jieh
- Cinematography: Chen Kun-hou
- Music by: Weng Ching-hsi
- Distributed by: Hsiao Chung Productions
- Release date: February 10, 1979 (Taiwan)
- Running time: 94 minutes
- Country: Taiwan
- Language: Mandarin

The Story of a Small Town (Chinese: 小城故事; pinyin: Xiǎochéng gùshì) is a 1979 Taiwanese film. The film was directed by Li Hsing and produced by Hsiao Chung Productions (小眾電影公司). It revolves around a family living in a small town. Kenny Bee plays the male family member who is released from prison and falls in love with a mute woman (Joan Lin). The film was remade as a TV series, featuring Yang Kuei-mei (楊貴媚) and Yin Xiaotian (印小天).

== Cast and crew ==
Cast

- Kenny Bee
- Joan Lin
- Ko Hsiang-ting
- Lee Lieh (李烈)
- Chen Jun-jieh (陳俊傑), credited as Ou Di (歐弟)

Crew

- Li Hsing, director and supervisor
- Liu Teng-shan (劉登善), story
- Chang Yung-hsiang, screenplay
- Chen Kun-hou (陳坤厚), cinematography
- Tsai Cheng-pin (蔡正彬), art director
- Chih Hsueh-fu (支學福), director of lighting
- Weng Ching-hsi (翁清溪), composer, credited as Tony Wong in this film and Tang Ni (湯尼) in other materials

== Accolades ==
In the 16th Golden Horse Film Festival and Awards (1979), this film won Best Picture, Best Original Screenplay, Best Actress (Joan Lin), and Best Child Star (Chen Jun-jieh).

Year	Award	Category	Recipient	Result	Ref.
1979	16th Golden Horse Awards	Best Feature Film	The Story of a Small Town	Won	
1979	16th Golden Horse Awards	Best Director	Li Hsing	Nominated	
1979	16th Golden Horse Awards	Best Leading Actress	Joan Lin	Won	
1979	16th Golden Horse Awards	Best Supporting Actor	Chiang Ming	Nominated	
1979	16th Golden Horse Awards	Best Child Star	Chen Jun-jieh	Won	
1979	16th Golden Horse Awards	Best Original Screenplay	Chang Yung-hsiang	Won	
1979	16th Golden Horse Awards	Best Cinematography	Chen Kun-hou	Nominated	
1979	16th Golden Horse Awards	Best Art Direction	Tsai Cheng-pin	Nominated	
1979	16th Golden Horse Awards	Best Film Score	Weng Ching-hsi	Nominated	
1979	16th Golden Horse Awards	Best Sound Recording	Wang Jung-fang	Nominated	

== Original soundtrack ==
Love Songs of Island, Vol. 6: Small Town Story

Soundtrack album by Teresa Teng
- Released: March 23, 1979
- Recorded: 1978–79
- Genres: Soundtrack; ballad
- Length: 36:44
- Language: Mandarin
- Labels: Polydor; Kolin

Singles from Small Town Story
- 1. "Small Town Story" Released: March 23, 1979

The Story of a Small Town (Chinese: 小城故事; pinyin: Xiǎochéng gùshì) soundtrack album was released by Taiwanese singer Teresa Teng on March 23, 1979. Tracks 1, 6, 7, and 8 are theme songs from the film. With the exception of track 7, the names of these tracks are different for each release. The album was released by Kolin Records (歌林股份有限公司) in Taiwan and by Polydor Records in Hong Kong and overseas.

Polydor re-recorded the theme songs for its own edition and released this album as Love Songs of Island, Vol. 6: Small Town Story (島國之情歌第六集:小城故事; Dǎoguó zhī qínggē dì liù jí). Weng Ching-hsi (翁清溪) is credited as Tang Ni (湯尼) on this album.

=== Track listing ===
Side A
No.	Title	Lyrics	Music	Notes	Length
1.	"Moment of Silence" (默默的一刻)	Chuang Nu	Weng Ching-hsi	Sub-theme	2:13
2.	"On My Mind" (心事)	Suen Yi	Weng Ching-hsi		3:28
3.	"Poetry" (詩意)	Liu Chia-chang	Liu Chia-chang		3:00
4.	"A Piece of a Fallen Leaf" (一片落葉)	Chuang Nu	Takashi Miki		3:27
5.	"The September Story" (九月的故事)	Suen Hei	Inaba Akira		3:42
6.	"Precious Small Town" (小城多可爱)	Chuang Nu	Weng Ching-hsi	Sub-theme	2:11
Total length:					18:01

Side B
No.	Title	Lyrics	Music	Notes	Length
7.	"Small Town Story" (小城故事)	Chuang Nu	Weng Ching-hsi	Main theme	2:19
8.	"Quiet Lane" (静静的小路)	Chuang Nu	Weng Ching-hsi	Sub-theme	3:15
9.	"Me and You" (我和你)	Lin Huang-kuen	Minoru Endo	Cover of "Kitaguni no Haru" (1977) by Masao Sen	3:46
10.	"Free and at Leisure" (逍遙自在)	Lin Huang-kuen	Minoru Endo	Cover of "Gardenia Flowers" (1973) by Tetsuya Watari	3:28
11.	"Place of First Loves" (初戀的地方)	Suen Hei	Liu Chia-chang	Originally sung by Chiang Lei	2:27
12.	"Thinking of You" (想起你)	Lin Huang-kuen	Kimiaki Inomata		3:28
Total length:					18:43

=== Certifications ===
Region	Certification	Certified units/sales
Hong Kong (IFPI Hong Kong)	Platinum	50,000^{*}
^{*} Sales figures based on certification alone.
