= The Young Ones (1973 film) =

1973 film by Li Hsing

- Film poster
- Directed by: Li Hsing
- Screenplay by: Chang Yung-hsiang
- Based on: Caiyun Fei by Chiung Yao
- Produced by: Chen Ru-ling
- Starring: Chen Chen; Alan Tang
- Cinematography: Lai Cheng-ying
- Edited by: Chen Hung-Min; Yang Pai Yung
- Music by: Tso Hung-yuan
- Production companies: Hing Fat Film Co.; Tai Lien Film Company
- Release date: 30 June 1973 (Taiwan)
- Running time: 95 minutes
- Country: Taiwan
- Language: Mandarin

The Young Ones (traditional Chinese: 彩雲飛; simplified Chinese: 彩云飞; pinyin: Cǎiyún Fēi; lit. 'Flying Rosy Clouds') is a 1973 Taiwanese film, spoken in Mandarin. The film was adapted into screenplay by Chang Yung-hsiang from the novel of the similar Chinese name by Chiung Yao. It was directed by Li Hsing and stars Chen Chen and Alan Tang. The score was composed and conducted by Tso Hung-yuan. In the film, college student Meng Yun Lao falls in love with a physically frail woman named Hai Ni, who later dies. Then he meets and falls for another woman, a pop singer named Hsiao Mei, who looks exactly like Hai Ni.

Chiung Yao's novels, Caiyun Fei and Hai'ou Fei Chu (海鷗飛處), were adapted into one 1980s television series, Hai'ou fei chu caiyun fei (海鷗飛處彩雲飛) (English: Seagulls Soaring In Iridescent Clouds).

== Cast ==
- Chen Chen as Hai Ni / Hsiao Mei
- Alan Tang as Meng Yun Lao
- Chiu Chen
- Lan Chi
- Chou Shao-Ching
- Fu Bi-Hui
- Su Han
- Man Huang
- Ko Hsiang-Ting
- Li Dai Ling
- Ming Min
- Chien Tsao
- Wan Sha Lang
- Yun Wang
- Ho Wu
- Yang Lieh
- Yeh Wei Wen
- Chung Yen

== Soundtrack ==
The Young Ones (彩雲飛; Caiyun Fei) is a 1973 soundtrack by Teresa Teng, You Ya (尤雅), and Wan Sha Lang (萬沙浪), released by Life Records. All songs were composed by Koo Yue (古月) except track ten, whose composer remains anonymous. Except tracks nine and ten, all songs are theme songs of the film. Lyrics from the titular song and "How Can I Leave You?" (我怎能離開你) are similar. "Thousand Words" (千言萬語) and "How Can I Leave You?" were re-recorded by Polydor Records (Hong Kong) for Teresa Teng's 1977 album Greatest Hits. Songs from the soundtrack have been later rendered by other singers.

Side one
No.	Title	Lyrics	Chinese	Length
1.	"Flying Rosy Clouds (Part I)" (You Ya)	Chiung Yao	彩雲飛之一 caiyun fei zhi yi
2.	"Thousand Words" (Teresa Teng)	Er Ying (爾英)	千言萬語 qian yan wan yu
3.	"Lonely Love" (Teresa Teng)	Er Ying	愛的寂寞
4.	"Flying Rosy Clouds (Part II)" (You Ya)	Chiung Yao	彩雲飛之二 caiyun fei zhi er
5.	"Flying Rosy Clouds" (Instrumental)		彩雲飛(音樂) caiyun fei (yinyue)

Side two
No.	Title	Lyrics	Chinese	Length
6.	"How Can I Leave You?" (Teresa Teng)	Chiung Yao	我怎能離開你 wo zenneng likai ni
7.	"Flying Rosy Clouds (Part III)" (Wan Sha-lang)	Chiung Yao	彩雲飛之三 caiyun fei zhi san
8.	"Unforgettable Dream" (Wan Sha-lang)	Tian Yu (田雨)	夢難忘 meng nanwang
9.	"Blue Girl" (Wan Sha-lang)	Tian Yu	藍色的姑娘 lanse de guniang
10.	"When Do You Come Back?" (Wan Sha-lang)	Nu Zhuang (奴莊)	何時你再來 heshi ni zai lai

=== Teresa Teng EP ===
All songs by Teresa Teng were also released by Lee Fung Records into a 7" EP vinyl plus another track not heard in the film.

Side one

1. "How Can I Leave You?" (我怎能離開你)
2. "Lonely Love" (愛的寂寞)

Side two

1. "Thousand Words" (千言萬語)
2. "Good Wine and Coffee" (美酒加咖啡)
