= Chung Li-ho Museum =

Museum in Meinong, Kaohsiung, Taiwan

- 鍾理和紀念館
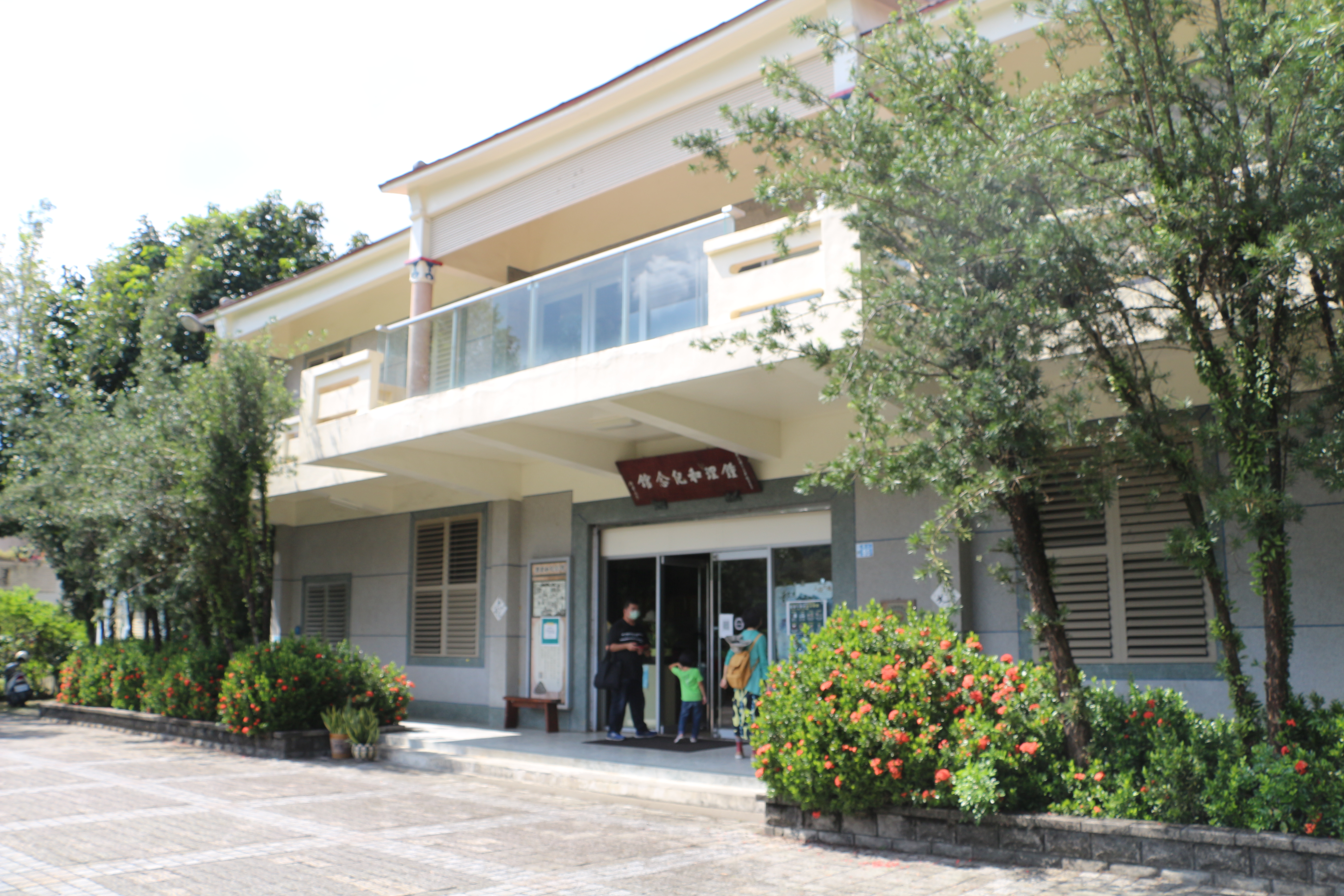
- Established: August 1983
- Location: Meinong, Kaohsiung, Taiwan
- Coordinates: 22°56′01″N 120°35′11″E
- Type: museum

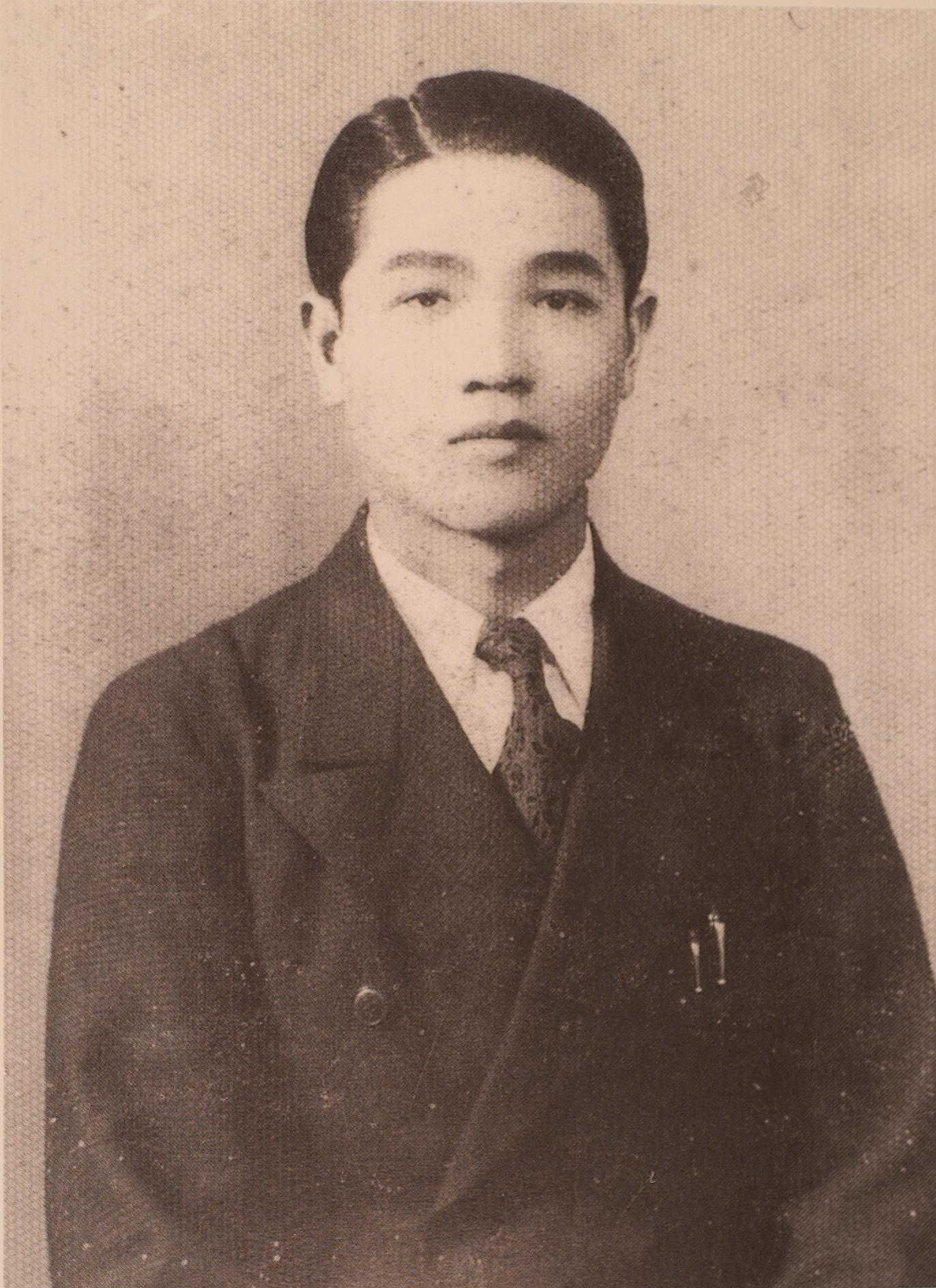
Chung Li-ho

The Chung Li-ho Museum (traditional Chinese: 鍾理和紀念館; simplified Chinese: 钟理和纪念馆; pinyin: Zhōng Lǐhé Jìniànguǎn) is a museum in Meinong District, Kaohsiung, Taiwan. The museum is dedicated to Taiwanese novelist Chung Li-ho.

== History ==
The idea to establish the museum started in June 1979 and the construction work of the building was completed in August 1983. It was the first museum writer's museum in Taiwan to be built by a citizens' organization. In 1997, the statue of Chung was erected and trail park was constructed at both sides of the museum by Kaohsiung County Government.

== Architecture ==
The museum is housed in a two-story building covering a total area of 1,655 m^{2}. It is located at the foothill of Mount Jianshan. The main theme of its architectural design is Taiwanese homes.

== Exhibitions ==
The museum houses manuscripts and objects of Chung's life. In addition to that, manuscripts of other Taiwanese writers are also collected and exhibited in this museum.

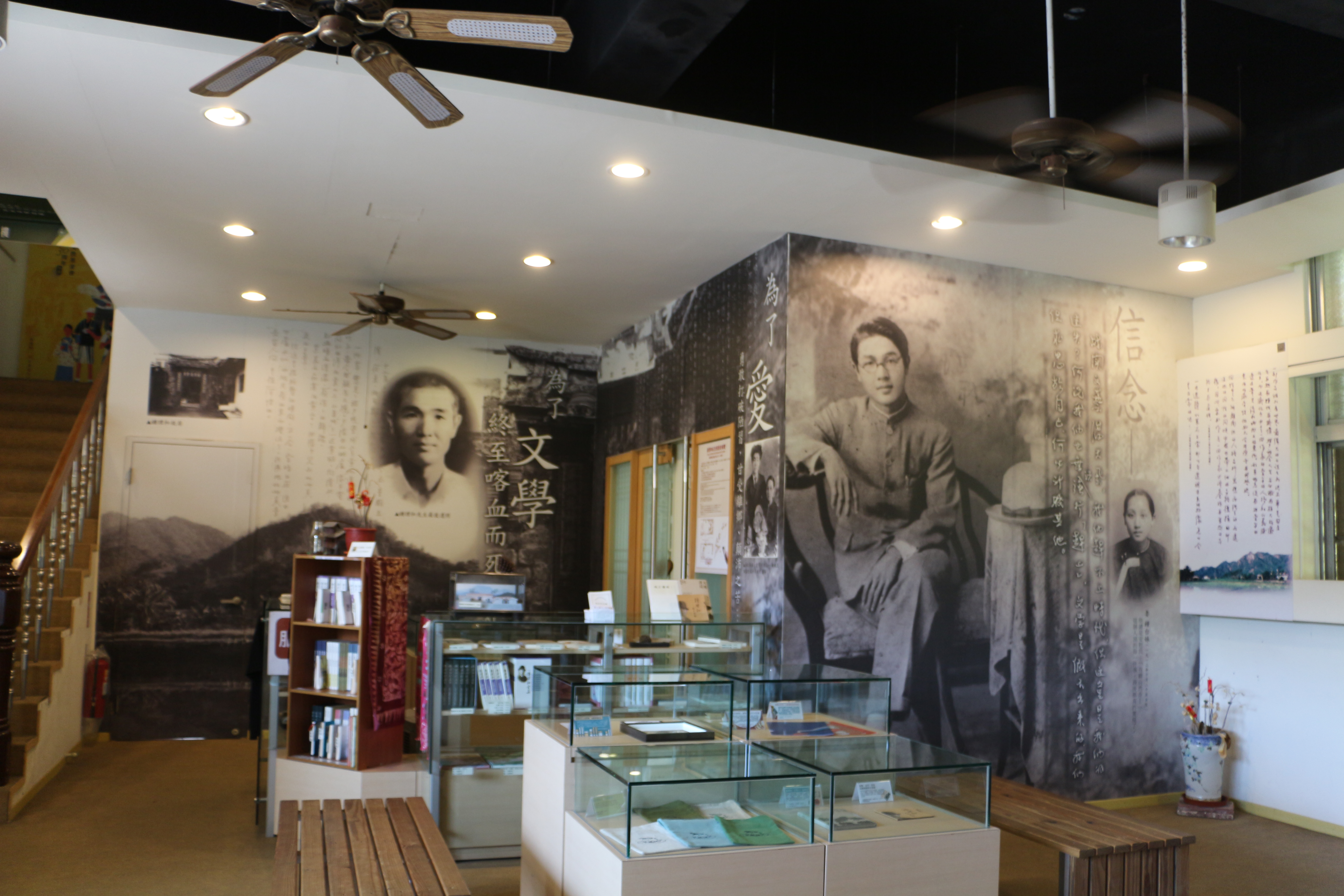

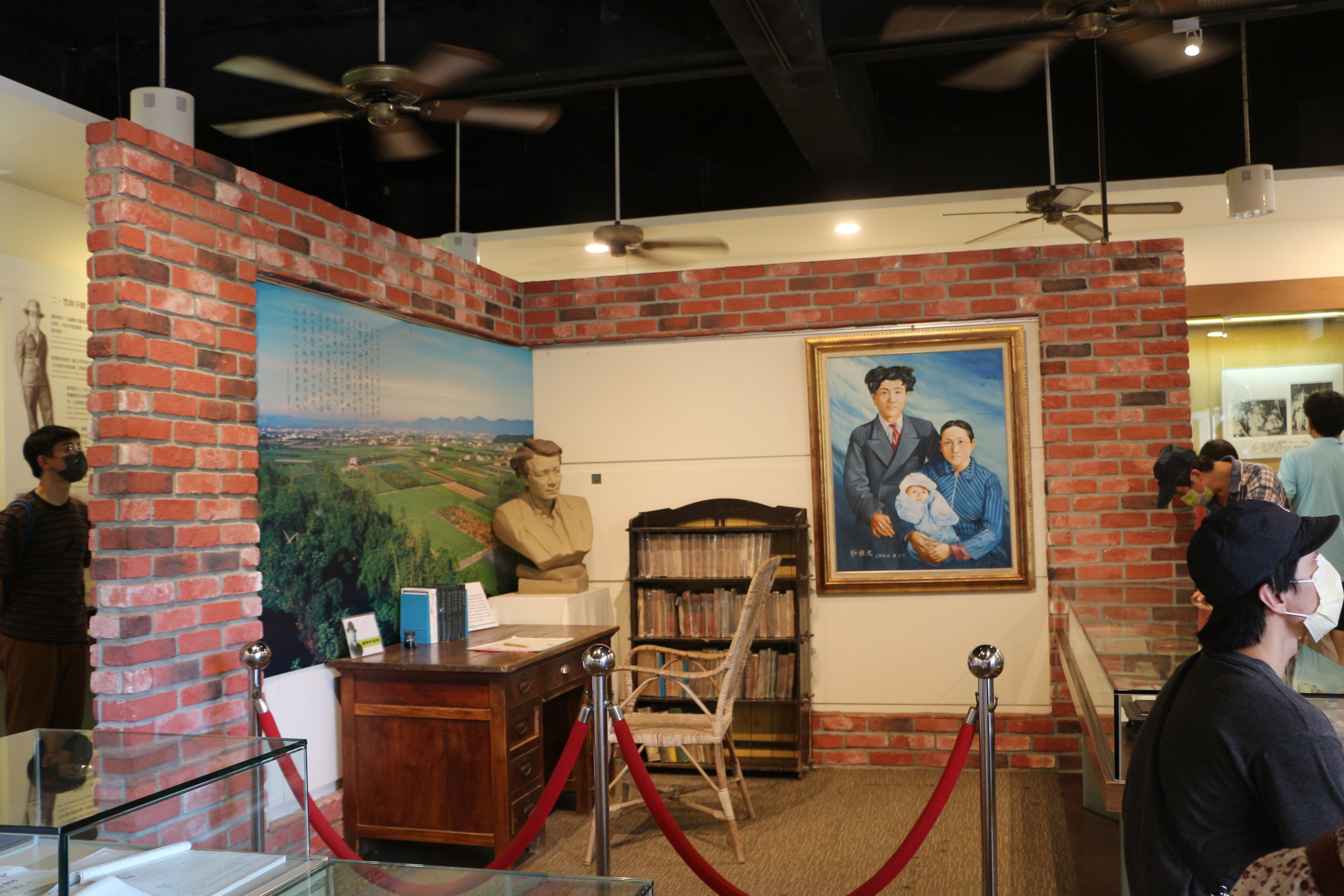

== See also ==
- List of museums in Taiwan
