= Meinong Folk Village =

Cultural center in Meinong, Kaohsiung, Taiwan

- 美濃民俗村
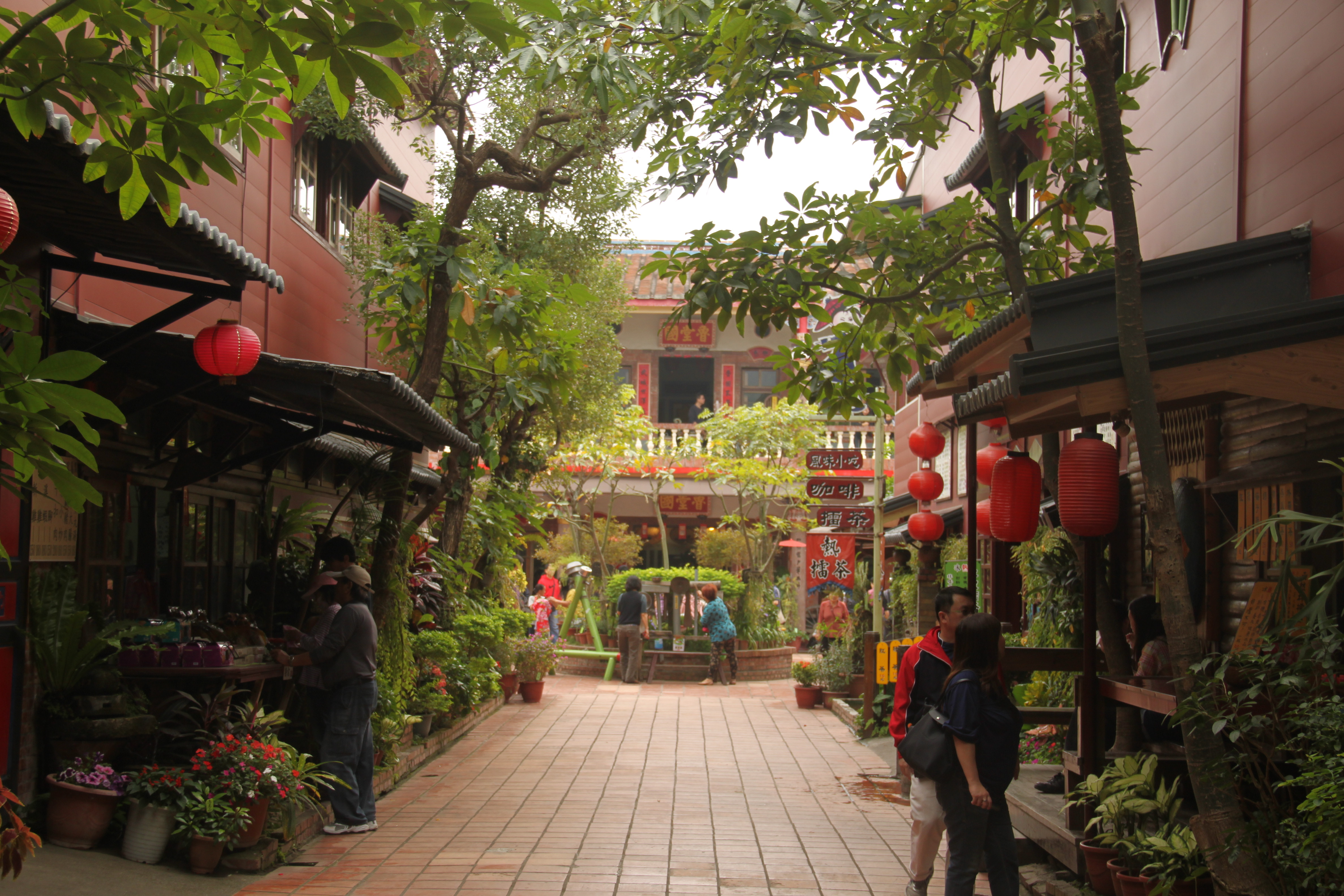
- Interactive map of the Meinong Folk Village area

General information
- Type: cultural center
- Location: Meinong, Kaohsiung, Taiwan
- Coordinates: 22°53′35.3″N 120°30′50.3″E

Website
- Official website

The Meinong Folk Village (WG: Meinung Folk Village; Chinese: 美濃民俗村; pinyin: Měinóng Mínsú Cūn) is a cultural center in Meinong District, Kaohsiung, Taiwan about Hakka people.

== History ==
The area was founded by Tsing Chi-hua to preserve the traditional folk crafts of Meinong.

== Exhibitions ==
The center exhibits the preserved Hakka cultures and local industries as well as the cultures and geography of Meinong.

== Facilities ==
The center includes shops and Hakka restaurant.

== See also ==
- List of tourist attractions in Taiwan
