= The Heroic Pioneers =

1986 film

- Film poster
- Directed by: Li Hsing
- Written by: Lei Chung
- Produced by: Li Chi-Tse
- Starring: Chang Ping-Yu; Chang Yuan-ting; Kuo Chun Chen; Lily Chen; Chiu Su-yi
- Cinematography: Chow Yip-Hing
- Edited by: Chow Diy-Sun; Lam Sin-Leung
- Music by: Tso Hung-yuan; Gerald Shih
- Production company: Taiwan Film Studio
- Release date: 9 October 1986 (Taiwan)
- Running time: 110 minutes
- Country: Taiwan
- Language: Mandarin

The Heroic Pioneers (Chinese: 唐山過台灣; pinyin: Tangshan guo Taiwan) is a 1986 Taiwanese drama film directed by Li Hsing. The film was selected as the Taiwanese entry for the Best Foreign Language Film at the 59th Academy Awards, but was not accepted as a nominee.

== Cast ==
- Chang Ping-yu
- Chang Yuan-ting
- Kuo Chun Chen
- Lily Chen
- Chiu Su-yi
- Fu Bihui
- Ho Ai-yun

== See also ==
- List of submissions to the 59th Academy Awards for Best Foreign Language Film
- List of Taiwanese submissions for the Academy Award for Best Foreign Language Film
