= Meinong East Gate Tower =

Gate in Meinong, Kaohsiung, Taiwan

- 瀰濃東門樓
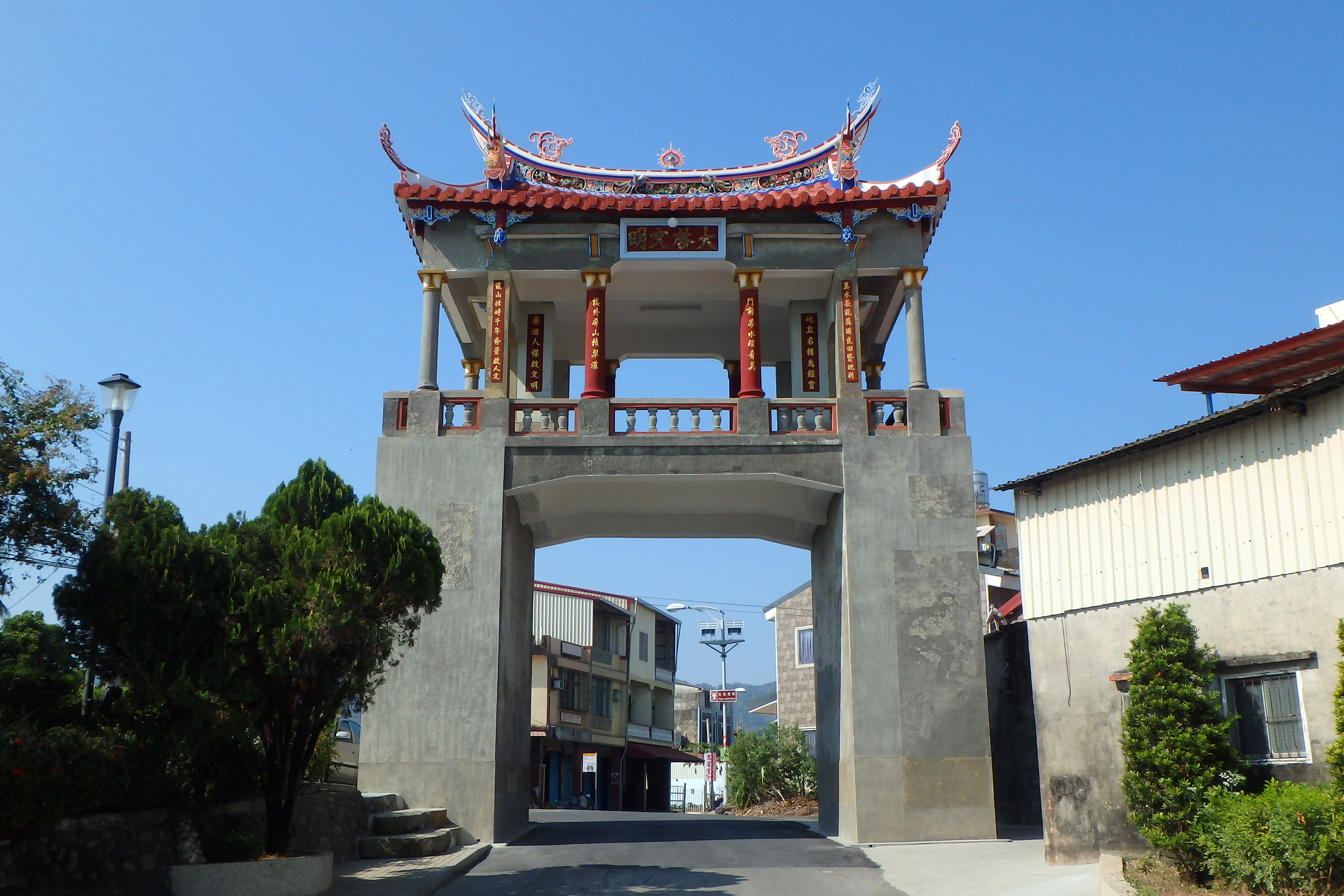
- Interactive map of the Meinong East Gate Tower area

General information
- Type: gate
- Location: Meinong, Kaohsiung, Taiwan
- Coordinates: 22°53′44.1″N 120°32′55.9″E
- Completed: 1755
- Renovated: 1937
- Destroyed: 1895

Height
- Height: 10.63 m (34.9 ft)

The Meinong East Gate Tower (traditional Chinese: 瀰濃東門樓; simplified Chinese: 弥浓东门楼; pinyin: Mínóng Dōngmén Lóu) is a historical gate in Meinong District, Kaohsiung, Taiwan.

== History ==
The tower was constructed in 1755 as a defense installation on the east side of Minong Village. The tower was destroyed during the revolt against Empire of Japan in 1895. In 1937, the tower was upgraded by local merchants and dignitaries. During the Pacific War in the 1940s, a small extension of the tower was added at the top in which a large bell was hung to be used as an air-raid alarm. However, both the extension and the bell were removed after the war. In May 2000, the gate was designated as a county-level historical monument by the Kaohsiung County Government.

== Architecture ==
The tower was constructed with Qing Dynasty architecture with a height of exactly 10.63 meters from its foundation to its highest peak. The front of the gatehouse hangs the banner of Initiation of Civilization which refers to the simulation of a local elite's inscription, which witnesses the changes of Meining in time.

== See also ==
- List of tourist attractions in Taiwan
