= 16th Golden Horse Awards =

1979 Taiwanese film awards ceremony

- Date: November 2, 1979
- Site: Sun Yat-sen Memorial Hall, Taipei, Taiwan
- Hosted by: Chiang Kuang-chao; Sylvia Chang
- Organized by: Taipei Golden Horse Film Festival Executive Committee

Highlights
- Best Feature Film: The Story of a Small Town
- Best Director: King Hu; Legend of the Mountain
- Best Actor: Ko Chun-hsiung; A Teacher of Great Soldiers
- Best Actress: Joan Lin; The Story of a Small Town
- Most awards: Legend of the Mountain (6)
- Most nominations: The Story of a Small Town (10)

The 16th Golden Horse Awards (Mandarin:第16屆金馬獎) took place on November 2, 1979, at Sun Yat-sen Memorial Hall in Taipei, Taiwan.

== Winners and nominees ==
Winners are listed first, highlighted in boldface.

**Best Feature Film**: **The Story of a Small Town**; Legend of the Mountain (runner-up); Drunken Master (runner-up - mention); A Teacher of Great Soldiers (runner-up - mention); The Voyage of Emperor Chien Lung (runner-up - mention); The Avenging Eagle (runner-up - mention); Fly Up With Love (runner-up - mention); A Special Smile (runner-up); Gone with Honor (runner-up); Love in Chilly Spring (runner-up); Off to Success (runner-up); Killing Does Not Pay (runner-up - mention)	**Best Documentary**: **Nu Chao Peng Pai**; Bei Gang Niu Xu (runner-up); Tai Wan De Hu Die (runner-up); Min Zu Wen Hua De Suo Ying — Jin Men (runner-up); Guo Shi Ying (runner-up); Chong Man Xi Wang De Yi Dai (runner-up - mention); Zhong Hua Min Guo Liu Shi Qi Nian Guo Qing Yue Bing (runner-up - mention); Beautiful Formosa (runner-up - mention); Guo Ji Tian Jing Yao Qing Sai (runner-up - mention); Qing Zhu Zhong Hua Min Guo Liu Shi Qi Nian Guo Qing (runner-up - mention)
**Best Animation – Runner Up**: **Xing Fu Zhang Wo Zai Nin Shou Zhong**	**Best Director**: **King Hu — Legend of the Mountain**; Li Hsing — The Story of a Small Town; Tu Chung-hsun — A Special Smile
**Best Leading Actor**: **Ko Chun-hsiung — A Teacher of Great Soldiers**; Shih Chun — Legend of the Mountain; Liang Hsiu-shen — Love in Chilly Spring	**Best Leading Actress**: **Joan Lin — The Story of a Small Town**; Sibelle Hu — A Special Smile; Hsu Feng — Legend of the Mountain
**Best Supporting Actor**: **Han Su — A Special Smile**; Yuen Siu-tien — Drunken Master; Chiang Ming — The Story of a Small Town	**Best Supporting Actress**: **Shen Shih-hua — Fly Up with Love**; Terry Hu — Rainbow in My Heart; Gua Ah-leh — Love in Chilly Spring
**Best Child Star**: **Chen Jun-jie — The Story of a Small Town**; Lien Chen-fan — A Special Smile	**Best Original Screenplay**: **Chang Yung-hsiang — The Story of a Small Town**; Lin Huang-kun — Love in Chilly Spring; Sung Hsiang-yu — A Special Smile
**Best Adapted Screenplay**: **Li Han-hsiang — The Voyage of Emperor Chien Lung**; Hsiao Yeh — Off to Success; Lin Chin-wei — Killing Does Not Pay	**Best Cinematography**: **Chen Chun-chieh — Legend of the Mountain**; Chen Kun-hou — The Story of a Small Town; Liao Ching-sung — Love in Chilly Spring
**Best Film Editing**: **Chiang Hsing-lung — The Avenging Eagle**; Hsiao Nan — Legend of the Mountain; Wang Chi-yang — Off to Success	**Best Art Direction**: **King Hu — Legend of the Mountain**; Tsai Cheng-pin — The Story of a Small Town; Chou Chih-liang — Love in Chilly Spring
**Best Film Score**: **Wu Ta-chiang — Legend of the Mountain**; Weng Ching-hsi — The Story of a Small Town; Li Tai-hsiang — A Special Smile	**Best Original Film Song**: **"Huan Yan" — A Special Smile**; Composer： Li Tai-hsiang; Lyrics: Shen Lv-bai; "Cheng Gong Ling Shang" — Off to Success; Composer： Lo Ming-dao; Lyrics： Zhuang Nu; "No Soil, No Flower" — Love in Chilly Spring; Composer： Lin Chia-ching; Lyrics： Lin Huang-kun
**Best Sound Recording**: **Chou Shao-lung — Legend of the Mountain**; Wang Jung-fang — The Story of a Small Town; Hsin Chiang-sheng — Off to Success	**Best Cinematography for Documentary**: **Wang Chu-chin - Tai Wan De Hu Die**; Peng Chun-tien — Bei Gang Niu Xu; Lo Jung-pen — Guo Shi Ying
**Best Planning for Documentary**: **Hung Lao-tien — Bei Gang Niu Xu**; Lei Chi-ming — Guo Shi Ying; Chao Chi-pin — Nu Chao Peng Pai	**Best Director for Animated Film** **(no winner)**: Huang Mu-tsun — Xing Fu Zhang Wo Zai Nin Shou Zhong
