= Meinong Cultural and Creative Center =

Multipurpose park in Meinong, Kaohsiung, Taiwan

- 美濃文創中心
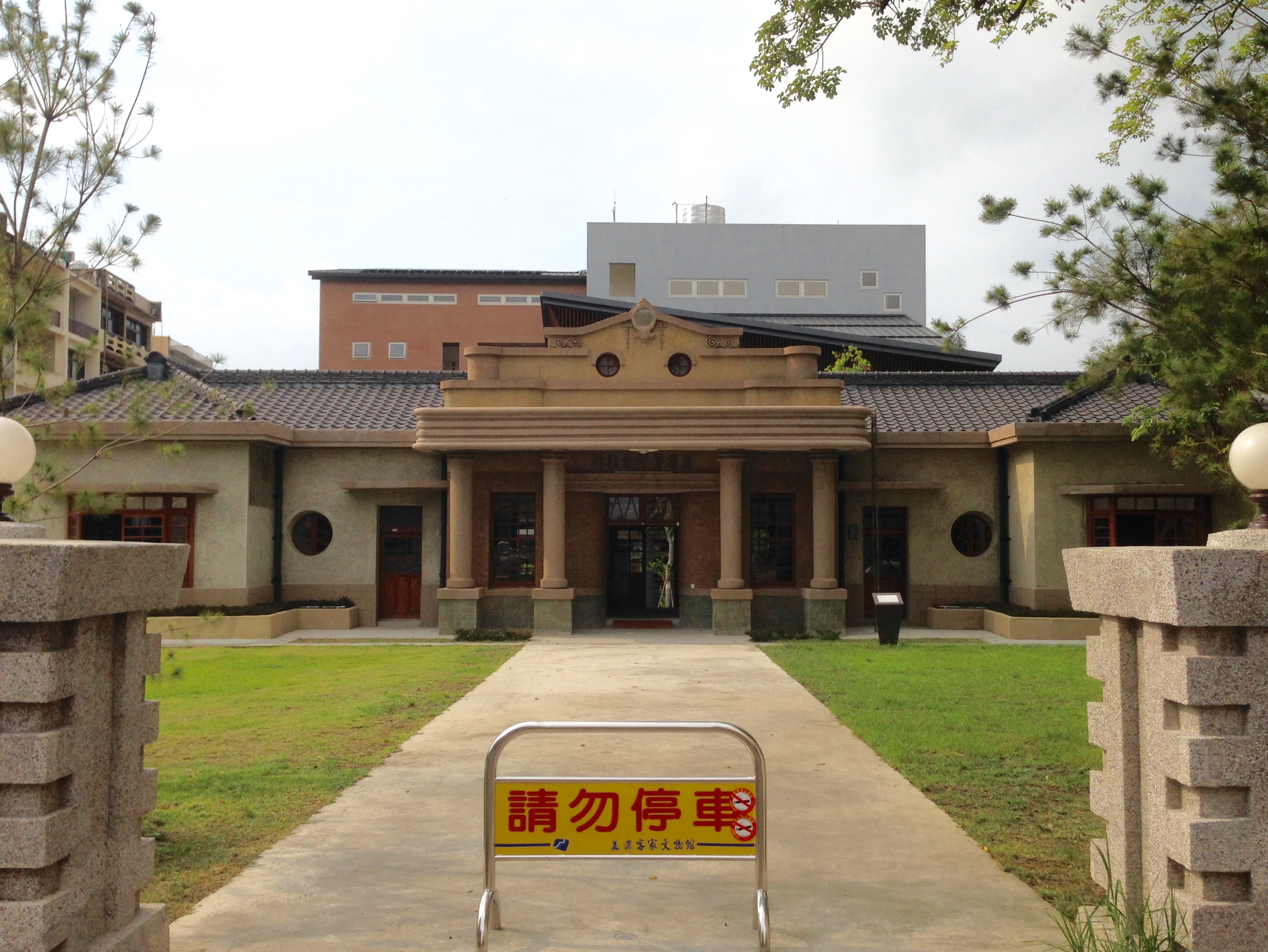
- Interactive map of the Meinong Cultural and Creative Center area

General information
- Type: former police station
- Architectural style: Baroque
- Location: Meinong, Kaohsiung, Taiwan
- Coordinates: 22°53′59.2″N 120°32′32″E
- Completed: 1902
- Opened: 2015

The Meinong Cultural and Creative Center (traditional Chinese: 美濃文創中心; simplified Chinese: 美浓文创中心; pinyin: Měinóng Wénchuàng Zhōngxīn) is a multi-purpose park in Meinong District, Kaohsiung, Taiwan.

== History ==
The area used to be a police station building which was built in 1902 at the political and economical center of Meinong. The area was then converted into a cultural and creative center in 2015.

== Architecture ==
The former police building is a reinforced concrete building blend with wooden frame built with Baroque architecture style. In the front of the building are stucco washing finish and face bricks. On both sides of the entrance are the circular window while the sides of the gable roof are ornamented with clay decorations. Bay windows are installed at offices and the dormitory on both sides of the traverse to allow more daylight inside. The structure at the rare uses the Japanese-style dormitory, in which the foundation is elevated and a large siding door is installed on the exterior rear side. The building is currently used as the visitor center for the cultural and creative center.

Other buildings in the center include a Japanese police dorm which is served as the center for young children. There are also the education, art and cultural hall which were constructed later on. Among all of the buildings is the Kaizhuang Square.

== See also ==
- List of tourist attractions in Taiwan
