= The Oxcart for Dowry =

Taiwanese short story collection

The Oxcart for Dowry (Chinese: 嫁妝一牛車) is a collection of short stories written by Taiwanese author Wang Chen-ho (王禎和). It was published in May 1969 by Pyramid Publishing in Taipei.

The book primarily features characters from the lower strata of society and depicts the changes in values, ethics, and interpersonal relationships in a gradually capitalizing and transforming society. It explores the pain, anxiety, doubt, and struggle that people experience as they compromise with reality for the sake of survival.

Wang Chen-ho rose to prominence in the 1960s, a time when anti-communist literature was waning. It was an era when a new generation of intellectuals sought change and innovation, drawing inspiration from Western modernization and literature and art. In 1960, students from National Taiwan University's Department of Foreign Languages and Literatures founded the magazine Modern Literature Quarterly (現代文學), introducing Western modernism. Wang first published works in Modern Literature Quarterly in 1961, marking the beginning of his literary career and earning appreciation from the Chinese writer Eileen Chang.

In 1966, the magazine Literature Quarterly (文學季刊) was founded. This magazine, which also introduced Western modernism, began to focus on the realities of Taiwan, and many of its contributors wrote what would later be called "nativist literature." In 1967, Wang Chen-ho began publishing a series of short stories in Literature Quarterly, including The Oxcart for Dowry. This story, written in a mix of Taiwanese and Mandarin, is a satirical comedy about a couple who face hardship because of their poverty. It is considered to be a turning point in Wang Chen-ho's literary experimentation with language.

The eponymous short story, The Oxcart for Dowry, has been studied alongside the work Oxcart by Taiwanese writer Lu Ho-jo (呂赫若). The language style of these works became a focal point of discussion and is considered representative of Taiwanese nativist literature.
