= Shuangsi Tropical Viviparous Forest =

Forest in Meinong, Kaohsiung, Taiwan

Shuangsi Tropical Viviparous Forest Chinese: 雙溪熱帶母樹林
- Location within Kaohsiung
- Interactive map of Shuangsi Tropical Viviparous Forest

Geography
- Location: Meinong, Kaohsiung, Taiwan
- Coordinates: 22°55′31.9″N 120°35′39.3″E
- Area: 7.65 ha (18.9 acres)

Administration
- Established: 1935

Shuangsi Tropical Viviparous Forest (traditional Chinese: 雙溪熱帶母樹林; simplified Chinese: 双溪热带母树林; pinyin: Shuāngxī Rèdài Mǔshùlín) is a forest reserve in Meinong District, Kaohsiung, Taiwan.

== History ==
It was established in 1935 by the Japanese colonial authorities, who imported and nurtured 270 plant and tree species from different parts of Asia, Australia, and South America, in order to learn which species could thrive in Taiwan.

== Geology ==
The forest spans over 7.65 hectares in area and is managed by the Council of Agriculture Forestry Bureau. Now 96 different tree species grow in the forest; eleven are represented by a single specimen. In a few cases, these exotics and the only trees of their kind surviving anywhere in Taiwan. The forest, around 100 meters above sea level, gets 2,000 to 3,000 millimeters of rain a year.

== See also ==
- Geography of Taiwan
