= Literary Friends Communications =

Literary Friends Communications (Chinese: 文友通訊) was a mimeographed literary publication that emerged in Taiwan in the late 1950s. It was founded by writers including Chung Chao-cheng and Chung Li-ho. In the process of editing and circulating the publication, Taiwanese writers exchanged ideas and mutually encouraged each other, forming a unique cohesion among writers.

== Background ==
In the 1950s, Taiwan was in a state of cross-strait tension due to the aftermaths of the Second Chinese Civil War, and the martial law led to a wartime mobilization period. In terms of literature, the Nationalist government implemented anti-communist literary policies and Mandarin promotion movements. Whether in newspaper supplements or other publications, Mandarin Chinese was the predominant language for creative works. Taiwanese writers who had used Japanese as their writing tool during the Japanese rule period almost lost the space to publish their works.

Recognizing the writing difficulties faced by Taiwanese writers, in April 1957, Chung Chao-cheng initiated a correspondence among Taiwanese writers through letters, giving rise to Literary Friends Communications. It is considered the first publication uniting Taiwanese writers after World War II, conducted through written correspondence. From the first issue in April 1957 until it ceased publication in September 1958, the newsletter was issued for a total of 1 year and 4 months, with a total of 16 communications. The main functions of Literary Friends Communications included reporting on the activities of various literary friends, circulating their works, and providing critiques.

== Influence ==
Literary Friends Communications, being non-publicly circulated, maintained the function of communication and the spirit of private commentary on works. During the martial law period in Taiwan, in an environment where secret societies were viewed with suspicion for potentially compromising security, the operation of Literary Friends Communications was indeed valuable. It represented a groundbreaking attempt to overcome the limitations of mainstream publications that found it challenging to publish works by Taiwanese writers. In literary history, it holds a special significance.
