= Black List (1972 film) =

1972 Hong Kong film by John Law

- Film poster
- Directed by: John Law
- Written by: Teng Yu-kun
- Produced by: Lu Cheng Hsing
- Starring: Chen Sing; Shih Ming; Henry Yung Yu; Michael Wai-Man Chan; Fang Yeh
- Cinematography: Lam Wa-Chiu
- Edited by: Lam Wa-Chiu
- Music by: Joseph Koo
- Production company: Hong Kong Kai Fa Film Co.
- Release date: 2 November 1972 (Hong Kong)
- Running time: 84 minutes
- Country: Hong Kong
- Language: Mandarin

Black List is a 1972 Hong Kong film. It was directed by John Law and written by Teng Yu-kun.

== Premise ==
A fighter released from prison after being framed for crimes he didn't commit teams up with his friend to get revenge on the criminal forces who set him up.

== Cast ==
- Chen Sing
- Shih Ming
- Henry Yung Yu
- Michael Wai-Man Chan
- Fang Yeh
- Lee Sze-Kei

== Legacy ==
Producer Godfrey Ho would acquire the film after its initial release, and repurpose scenes from it into the films Ninja Heat and Ninja Exterminator.
