= Joan Lin =

Taiwanese actress

- 林鳳嬌
- Born: 30 June 1953 (age 72); Taipei, Taiwan
- Occupation: Actress
- Years active: 1972–1982, 2012
- Spouse: Jackie Chan (m. 1982)
- Children: Jaycee Chan

Chinese name
- Traditional Chinese: 林鳳嬌
- Simplified Chinese: 林凤娇
Transcriptions
Standard Mandarin
- Hanyu Pinyin: Lín Fèngjiāo
Yue: Cantonese
- Jyutping: Lam4 Fung6 Giu1

Joan Lin Feng-jiao (born 30 June 1953) is a Taiwanese former actress. She is married to Hong Kong actor and martial artist Jackie Chan.

== Early life ==
Born 30 June 1953 in Taipei, Lin was the second child out of five children. She dropped out of school at the age of 12 due to her family's poverty.

== Career ==
In 1972, at age 19, Lin starred in her first film, The Hero of Chiu Chow (also known as Hero of Waterfront), a Kung fu film. Many of her films are based on the novels of Chiung Yao.

Lin, together with Charlie Chin and Chin Han and Brigitte Lin, were the biggest names in the Taiwanese and Hong Kong cinema industries in the 1970s. Dubbed the "Two Chins, Two Lins" (二秦二林) by the media, they were known for starring in several box-office hits, many of which were adaptations of Chiung Yao's novels.

In 1979, she won Best Leading Actress at the 16th Golden Horse Awards for her performance in The Story of a Small Town. During her 10-year career, Lin appeared in more than 70 films.

== Personal life ==
Joan Lin met Hong Kong actor and martial artist Jackie Chan in January 1981 and they secretly married in Los Angeles in 1982. Their only child, Jaycee Chan, was born the day after they got married. Lin has since retired from the film industry.

== Filmography ==
=== Films (selected) ===
Year	Title	Original Title	Role
1975	Land of the Undaunted	吾土吾民	Tu Hsiang-ling
1978	He Never Gives Up	汪洋中的一條船	Wu Chi-chao
1979	The Story of a Small Town	小城故事	Lai A-hsiu
1979	Good Morning, Taipei	早安台北	Su Chi
1980	My Native Land	原鄉人	Chung Tai-mei
1980	Spring in Autumn	天涼好個秋	Ho Li-wen
1981	The Battle for the Republic of China	辛亥雙十	Peng Yu-shih
2012	CZ12	十二生肖	JC's wife

== Awards and nominations ==
Year	Award	Category	Nominated work	Result
1978	15th Golden Horse Awards	Best Leading Actress	He Never Gives Up	Nominated
1979	16th Golden Horse Awards	Best Leading Actress	The Story of a Small Town	Won
