= Brother Liu and Brother Wang on the Roads in Taiwan =

1958 film

- Film poster for Part 1
- Traditional Chinese: 王哥柳哥遊台灣
- Simplified Chinese: 王哥柳哥游台湾
- Hanyu Pinyin: Wánggē Liǔgē yóu Táiwān
- Hokkien POJ: Ông-ko Liú-ko Iû Tâi-oân
- Directed by: Li Hsing; Chang Fang-Hsia (張方霞); Tien Feng
- Written by: Li Hsing; Zhong Murong; Hsiao Tung
- Produced by: Lai Kuo-Tsai
- Starring: Shorty Cai; Li Guanzhang (李冠章); Ko Yu-Hsia
- Cinematography: Chen Chung-Hsin
- Edited by: Li Hsing
- Music by: Chow Lan-Ping
- Production company: Tai Lien Film Company
- Release dates: February 7, 1959 (Part 1); February 19, 1959 (Part 2)
- Running time: 155 minutes
- Country: Taiwan
- Language: Taiwanese

Brother Wang and Brother Liu on the Roads in Taiwan, or Brother Wang and Brother Liu Tour Taiwan (Chinese: 王哥柳哥遊台灣) is a Taiwanese Hokkien-language comedy film directed by Li Hsing, Chang Fang-Hsia and Tien Feng. It was released in 1959 as a two-part series. Part One premiered on February 7, 1959. Part Two premiered on February 19, 1959.

== Plot ==
Wang and Liu, a plump shoeshiner and a skinny rickshaw driver living together in Taipei, see a fortune teller who states that the former will strike it rich in three days but the latter will die in 44. Wang indeed wins the lottery as predicted, causing Liu to fear for his life; in response, Wang decides to traverse the entire island of Taiwan with Liu before he dies. The duo encounter various situations and predicaments due to their lavish spending of their new wealth. Finally, they return to Taiwan as the predicted day of Liu's death approaches so he can spend his last moments with his girlfriend A-Hua. However, on the day of his death, he waits and waits until midnight, where the prediction is disproven and Liu stays alive. The next day, he happily marries A-Hua with Wang in tow.

== Cast ==
- Li Guanzhang as Brother Wang (王哥)
- Zhang Fucai (Shorty Cai) as Brother Liu (柳哥)

== Reception ==
One of the first Taiwanese-language films that was a comedy and used an original script (as opposed to Taiwanese opera), the film was a blockbuster and seven sequels were made as a result of its success. The main characters were often held in regard as a localization of Laurel and Hardy. The film was restored by the Taiwan Film and Audiovisual Institute (TFAI) as an effort to preserve Taiwan's history of cinema.

== Home media ==
=== DVD ===
Release date	Country	Classifaction	Publisher	Format	Language	Subtitles	Notes
2012-05-31	Taiwan	All Regions	Hoker Records	NTSC DVD	Taiwanese	Traditional Chinese	
