= Teng Yu-kun =

Taiwanese screenwriter

- Born: October 15, 1946; Yunnan, China
- Died: July 4, 2011 (aged 64); Xuhui District, Shanghai, China
- Education: National Taiwan University
- Spouses: Chin Mei (1974–1988); Leanne Liu (1999–2011)
- Children: 2
- Awards: Golden Horse Awards – Best Screenplay; 1976 Victory

Chinese name
- Traditional Chinese: 鄧育昆
- Simplified Chinese: 邓育昆
Transcriptions
Standard Mandarin
- Hanyu Pinyin: Dèng Yùkūn

Teng Yu-kun (15 October 1946 – 4 July 2011) was a Golden Horse Award-winning Taiwanese screenwriter.

His younger brother Teng Yu-ching (鄧育慶) was a director with whom he often collaborated on television. Teng Yu-kun was married to actress Chin Mei (金玫) from 1974 to 1988, and actress Leanne Liu from 1999 until his 2011 death, when he accidentally fell out of the window of their third-floor Shanghai apartment.

== Filmography (incomplete) ==
=== Films ===
Year	English title	Chinese title	Notes
1971	Love Can Forgive and Forget	真假千金	
1971	The Ammunition Hunters	落鷹峽	
1971	Everything Is Going My Way	事事如意	
1972	Chinese Kung Fu	中國功夫	
1972	Black List	黑名單	
1972	Love in a Cabin	白屋之戀	
1973	Love Begins Here	愛的天地	
1973	The White Butterfly Killer	蝴蝶殺手	
1974	Death Trap	死囚	
1974	Niu Spacious Yard	牛家大院	
1974	Sergeant Hsiung	大摩天嶺	
1975	Majesty Cat	南俠展昭	
1976	The Star	星語	
1976	Victory	梅花	
1976	The Black Justice	包青天	
1976	Golden Leaves	秋纏	
1977	A Misty Love	小雨絲絲	
1977	Taipei 66	台北66	
1977	Taipei 77	台北77	
1978	Autumn Memories	楓林小雨	
1979	A Teacher of Great Soldiers	黃埔軍魂	
1979	A Little Reason	錦標	
1980	Mission Over the Eagle Castle	血濺冷鷹堡	
1981	The Coldest Winter in Peking	皇天后土	
1982	Play Con Game	十張王牌	
1982	Breaking Through the Black Whirl	衝破黑漩渦	
1983	Black and White	黑白珠	
1987		花月正春風大結局	

=== TV series ===
Year	English title	Chinese title	Notes
1988	Eight Thousand Li of Cloud and Moon	八千里路雲和月	
1992	The Legend of Cixi	戲說慈禧	
1993	Justice Pao	包青天	
1994	The Seven Heroes and Five Gallants	七俠五義	
1995	Guan Gong	關公	
1995	Justice Pao	新包青天	
1996	Bodyguard	保鏢	
2001	Misty Rain in Jiangnan	煙雨江南	
2005	Justice Bao: The Legend of Bai Yutang	江湖夜雨十年燈	
