= Rose, Rose, I Love You (novel) =

Rose, Rose, I Love You (Chinese: 玫瑰玫瑰我愛你) is one of the representative novels by the prominent Taiwanese local writer Wang Chen-ho (王禎和). It was initially published by the Vista Publishing House Co. in Taipei in 1984 and later republished by another publishing house in Taipei called Hung Fan in February 1994.

Set in the small town of Hualien after World War II, the work depicts the U.S. military's vacation of a group of U.S. GIs in Taiwan during the Vietnam War, which caused turmoil among local legislators and specific industries. This novel vividly portrays the greed and abomination of politicians and intellectuals.

It was inspired when the author first saw the American soldiers vacationing in Hualien during his childhood, and bars were constructed to accommodate the American soldiers at that time, which left him with a profound impression.

== Plot ==
The story is set in Hualien City, Hualien County, Taiwan, unfolding within a church. It is primarily centered around the kick-off ceremony of the "bar girl training program" that spans just a few hours, from the commencement to its conclusion. Throughout the narrative, the story intermittently employs the technique of flash back to portray a group of people planning how to train local Taiwanese sex workers to be bar girls capable of serving American soldiers within only a span of just five days, all with the aim of earning American money.

== Analysis ==
The title Rose, Rose, I Love You is actually a pun, carrying double satirical meanings: firstly, it subtly alludes to the sexually transmitted disease syphilis, implying that the bar girls may unknowingly contract this disease through their prostitution activities. Secondly, the term "rose" (meigui) phonetically resembles "America" (meiguo) in Chinese Mandarin. Therefore, "Rose, Rose, I Love You" can be interpreted as "America, America, I Love You", reflecting in the novel that all the characters welcome American soldiers to Taiwan for prostitution.

This work by Wang Chen-ho is a novel that lacks positive characters in its portrayal of humble individuals. It faced significant criticism for its departure from themes of social justice or humanitarianism. Wang Chen-ho himself adapted the novel into a screenplay for a film.
