= Chiang Ching (dancer) =

Chinese-American dancer and actress

- 江青
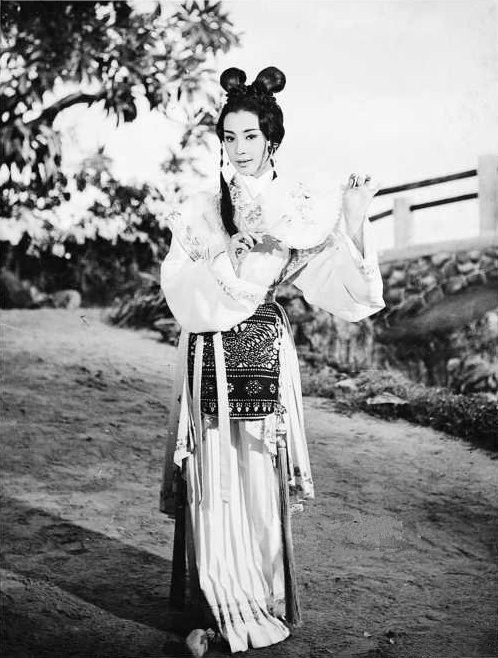
- Chiang in movie Seven Fairies (1963)
- Pronunciation: pinyin: Jiāng Qīng
- Born: Jiang Duqing; 26 January 1946 (age 80); Peiping, China
- Citizenship: United States
- Education: Beijing Dance School; Southern Experimental Theatre
- Years active: 1960s to present
- Awards: 5th Golden Horse Awards Best Leading Actress (1967)

Chiang Ching (Chinese: 江青; born 26 January 1946), occasionally spelled as Jiang Qing, birth name Jiang Duqing, is a Chinese-born American dancer and film actress based in New York, United States, and Sweden.

With an ancestral root in Puning, Guangdong, she was born in Beijing and attended primary school in Shanghai. She was selected to study ballet and folk dance at the Beijing Dance School. Shortly before graduation, during a visit to Hong Kong to see her parents, she was detained by her father and subsequently joined the Southern Experimental Theatre of Shaw Brothers Studio. She rose to fame in Taiwan as the lead actress in director Li Han-hsiang's film Seven Fairies (1963). She won the Best Leading Actress of the Golden Horse Awards in 1967 due to her performance in the film How Many Enchanting Nights (1966), adapted from Chiung Yao's novel.

In 1966, she married musician Liu Chia-chang but divorced in 1970 and moved to the United States. In 1973, she became a U.S. citizen and founded the Chiang Ching Dance Company, gaining renown for her contributions to modern dance and mentoring notable dancers such as Lin Hwai-min. Influenced by the 1989 Tiananmen Square Incident, she began writing and published several memoirs in Chinese since 1991.

== Early life ==
=== Childhood in Shanghai ===
In 1946, Jiang Duqing was born in Beiping (now Beijing) and later relocated to Shanghai. She attended the privately-run Guorun Primary School in Shanghai, established by her maternal grandfather, Wu Weirun. After 1949, Chiang’s grandfather and mother embraced the ideals of the Chinese Communist Party (CCP), personally participating in land reforms in rural areas, turning over their land to the state, and encouraging Chiang’s father, who remained in Hong Kong, to return and serve the nation.

On 30 September 1954, Jiang Duqing, then just 8 years old, witnessed her grandfather being handcuffed and taken away by strangers. That same year, in line with the CCP’s emphasis on collectivism in education, Chiang’s mother removed the character "独; 獨" (meaning "independent") from her name, renaming her "Qing" (also spelled as "Ching"). At the time, the name of Mao Zedong’s wife was not widely known. Chiang's mother explained that their class was "a sacrificed class" and that as long as the majority of Chinese people improved their lives, there should be no resentment over their sacrifices.

A year later, the family learned that Wu Weirun had been classified as a "historical counter-revolutionary," and as a result, the entire family was labelled "counter-revolutionary relatives." Chiang's mother was dismissed from her position as headmistress, her eldest maternal uncle was expelled from the physics department of Nanjing University, her second maternal aunt was sent to Dafeng Farm in northern Jiangsu for forced labour, and other uncles and aunts were barred from entering university.

=== Dance training in Beijing ===
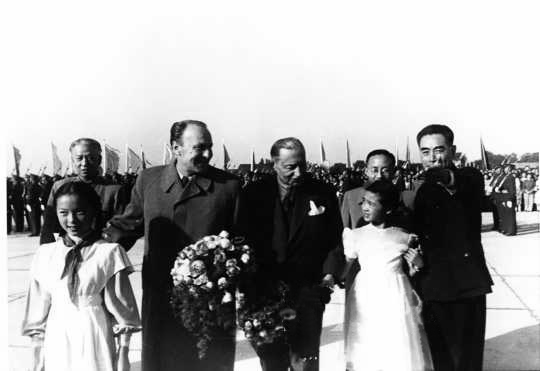
Chiang (the girl in white on the right) presenting flowers to Hungarian prime minister János Kádár at Beijing Capital Airport on 27 September 1957

In 1956, encouraged by her maternal uncle, Chiang applied to the Beijing Dance School. Out of more than a thousand applicants, she was unexpectedly admitted. Leaving Shanghai for Beijing, she escaped the discrimination associated with her family's "counter-revolutionary" status, while her mother was suspended from her office for investigation, an ordeal that nearly drove her to suicide. In 1957, her mother took Chiang’s two younger brothers to Hong Kong to reunite with their father. Chiang later recalled that after watching the Indian film Awaara, her mother realised that staying in China would condemn her children to a life of stigma due to the bloodline theory.

In the summer of 1957, Chiang visited Hong Kong for the first time to see her family. While impressed by Hong Kong's material abundance, she found that local newspapers were filled with stories of crime and poverty, sharply contrasting with her idealised image of a vibrant and flourishing China. After returning to Beijing, she was chosen to present flowers to Hungarian Prime Minister János Kádár at Beijing Capital Airport on 27 September. Chinese premier Zhou Enlai held her hand and guided her through the ceremony, a moment she found unforgettable. A photograph of her presenting flowers appeared in the People's Daily the next day. Chiang clipped it out and sent it to her mother in Hong Kong.

The Beijing Dance School, modelled on the Soviet system, provided free tuition, accommodation, dancewear, nutritional supplements, and performance observation fees—a remarkable benefit during a time of scarcity. Chiang threw herself into her dance training, studying both ballet and traditional Chinese dance. She was classmates with future renowned dance artists such as Zhao Ruheng. During the establishment of the People’s Commune in 1957, she briefly lived with a poor peasant family. In 1959, during the 10th anniversary celebrations of the People’s Republic of China, she stood on the float, dressed in a short skirt, as it passed over the Jinshui Bridge in front of Tiananmen.

=== Exile in Hong Kong ===
In 1962, as Chiang was about to graduate from the Beijing Dance School, she had resolved that the summer trip to visit her family would be her last. After graduation, she decided she would no longer apply for family visits. However, her father believed that Chiang staying in Beijing would jeopardise her brothers’ opportunities to study in the West. To prevent her return to Beijing, he hid her travel documents. In response, Chiang went on a hunger strike to protest. By the time her mother returned the documents, they had already expired. Chiang secretly wrote to her school, explaining that she needed new documents to return. She then received a letter from an unknown person instructing her to be at a certain location where she would be assisted in returning to school. However, Chiang worried she would be unable to justify her overdue absence and feared that her actions might negatively affect her brothers. Ultimately, she decided to stay in Hong Kong.

In Hong Kong, Chiang neither spoke Cantonese nor made an effort to learn English, and she found the environment deeply uncomfortable. For a time, she became despondent, refusing to continue her education. Chiang’s failure to return was regarded as defection by the Chinese authorities, and her teachers, friends, and family were implicated as a result. Years later, the director of the Beijing Dance Academy, Chen Jinqing, told Chiang, "You have no idea how much I suffered during the Cultural Revolution because of your name—I ended up being the one who trained a student bold enough to share the name Jiang Qing and defect to Taiwan."

== Career ==
=== Film actress ===
While in Hong Kong, actor Chen Yu Hsin from Shaw Brothers Studio visited Chiang's home and encouraged her to apply for the Southern Experimental Theatre under Shaw Brothers. At the theatre, Chiang became close friends with Cheng Pei-pei, and together they choreographed the dance performances and performed on behalf of Shaw Brothers. Subsequently, Chiang appeared in The Story of Sue San (玉堂春), a Huangmei opera film directed by King Hu, where she played the role of a courtesan. When director Li Han-hsiang was preparing for the film Seven Fairies (七仙女), he learned that Chiang had trained at the Beijing Dance School and hired her as a choreographer. The lead actress, Betty Loh Ti, withdrew from the project, so Li asked Chiang to teach newcomer Fang Ying the dance routines. However, Fang struggled to learn the steps, and Chiang ultimately took on the lead role herself. Li Han-hsiang had a falling-out with Shaw Brothers and left with a group of collaborators, to establish Grand Motion Pictures in Taiwan, the first large-scale private film studio in Taiwan.

In 1963, Chiang followed Li to Taiwan, with the condition that she would not perform under the label of "anti-communism." She was accompanied by fellow actress Wang Ling. Chiang became an actress for Grand Motion Pictures, joining Wang Ling, Niu Fang-yu, Li Deng-hui, and Zhen Zhen as the “Five Phoenixes of Grand Motion Pictures.” With the support of Long Fang, director of the Taiwan Film Studio, Li Han-hsiang used a sound stage in the Taipei Botanical Garden to film Seven Fairies. Meanwhile, Shaw Brothers, under the direction of Ho Meng-hua and Chan Yat-sun, hurriedly produced their own version of Seven Fairies to compete with Grand Motion Pictures. Chiang’s performance as the lead actress in Seven Fairies catapulted her to stardom. In 1964, she starred in Xi Shi and later won the Best Actress at the Golden Horse Awards in 1967 for her role in the film How Many Enchanting Nights (幾度夕陽紅) adapted from Chiung Yao's novel.

Over her seven-year career, Chiang appeared in 29 films. Despite her success, she remarked that she felt like she was "living in a zoo." By the mid-1960s, as a well-known actress in Taiwan, Chiang learned for the first time about the existence of another Chiang Ching in China. To differentiate the two, Taiwanese media often referred to them as “Chiang of this shore” and “Chiang of the other shore.”

=== Marriage in Taiwan ===
Chiang gradually grew disenchanted with her career in entertainment. One day, while having beef noodles near National Taiwan University, Liu Chia-chang proposed to her with a NT$80 ring. Chiang was charmed by his romantic gesture and agreed to marry him. They formally married on 20 July 1966, which came as a shock to the media, as Liu was not yet a prominent musician, whereas Chiang was already a well-known actress. Liu later admitted to the media that he had actually fallen in love with Chen Chen at first sight and that Chiang had acted as the intermediary for their communication—until he eventually married Chiang. As Chiang recalled, after marrying Liu, Chiang found herself trapped in financial debt and burdened with household responsibilities. She came to realise that Taiwan remained a male-dominated, traditional society, but she was unwilling to sacrifice everything for her husband.

In 1970, Chiang divorced Liu and left Taiwan for the United States. News of her divorce once again became a media sensation. Liu was seen hurrying out of a press conference with tearful eyes, carrying their four-year-old son, while Chiang remained silent throughout. Rumour had it that Li Han-hsiang had been involved in an affair with Chiang since their arrival in Taiwan in 1962. This rumour resurfaced after Chiang’s divorce, prompting Liu to confront and physically assault Li at a film studio in Taoyuan. Li Ao noted that Li Han-hsiang had firmly denied the affair, and Li Ao himself had to intervene to help Li Han-hsiang explain the situation to Liu.

=== Dance troupe ===
In the summer of 1970, Chiang travelled to the United States via Japan. She settled in Santa Monica, Los Angeles, began learning English, and used her evenings and weekends to compile Chinese Folk Dance. Through her volunteer English tutor, a Jewish elderly woman, she connected with Chinese students passionate about dance and started planning to open a dance class. Lin Hwai-min, who had arrived in the U.S. in 1969, also took a few Chinese dance lessons from Chiang. Amidst the fervour of the protests against Japanese occupation of Diaoyu Islands among Chinese in the United States, Chiang cautioned her friends with insights from her experience of Anti-Rightist Movement in China.

In 1971, she gave a demonstration of Chinese folk dance at California State University, Long Beach, earning $25 for travel expenses. By 1972, she joined the University of California, Berkeley as a dance instructor and was introduced to modern dance. That summer, she attended the American Dance Festival in Connecticut. Later that year, she accepted an invitation from the Massachusetts Institute of Technology to serve as a resident artist for one month, prompting her to move to New York. In 1973, she successfully held a public performance at the Town Hall, New York, and subsequently founded the Chiang Ching Dance Company. During her time in Hong Kong and Taiwan, Chiang carried a stateless passport for years, only applying for a U.S. passport in 1973.

After the Cultural Revolution ended, Chiang sought to return to mainland China to visit her family. However, her name were the same as Madame Mao, and was therefore, politically sensitive, and it took over ten months for her visa application to be processed. In 1978, she received an invitation to perform at the Hong Kong Asian Arts Festival with her "Chiang Ching Dance Company." Due to sensitivities surrounding her name—especially following the fall of the Gang of Four—Hong Kong authorities insisted on a name change. The troupe was eventually renamed the "Chiang Ching Dance Company of New York" allowing them to perform in Hong Kong.

In 1979, as the Gang of Four, including Madame Mao, was arrested. Chiang hastily married her boyfriend, Birger Blombäck, and obtained a Chinese visa under the name "Ching Blombäck". Upon arriving in Shanghai, she discovered that her relatives had been targeted during the Cultural Revolution, due to her defection. They were also accused of deliberately using the same name as Madame Mao. Her grandmother had suffered a mental breakdown and was partially paralysed, her second aunt had endured years of forced labour pulling heavy carts, and three family members had committed suicide.

In 1980, with the help of Beijing Dance Academy’s director Chen Jinqing, Chiang performed her first show in mainland China. Although Dance magazine initially featured her on its cover, Chen Jinqing, concerned about the risks associated with Madame Mao, requested that the article be withdrawn.

== Freelance artist ==
In 1982, Chiang was appointed as the first artistic director of the Hong Kong Dance Company. She later taught at UC Berkeley, NYU Steinhardt School of Culture, Education, and Human Development, Danshögskolan and Beijing Dance Academy. She resigned from her role in Hong Kong in 1984, dissolved the Chiang Ching Dance Company, and relocated to Sweden with her husband and child, becoming an independent choreographer. Subsequently, she diversified her artistic pursuits across different fields.

In 1986, she found her name on a Chinese magazine in an article introducing the Golden Horse Awards. She felt that her name was eventually accepted in China like any other names and since 1987 began frequently returning to China, where she conducted modern dance workshops and demonstrations. In 1987, she contacted Gao Xingjian, who she had been reading about in the 1980s, and began collaborations on transforming classic Chinese poems into modern dance. That same year, she performed in Lhasa, Tibet, marking the first-ever modern dance performance in Tibet. Additionally, she choreographed Puccini’s opera Turandot for the Metropolitan Opera at the Lincoln Center in New York.

In 1989, deeply affected by the Tiananmen Square Incident, Jiang decided to write her autobiography, which was published in 1991. She later adapted part of it into a film script, which won the Outstanding Film Script Award in Taiwan in 1993.

In 1999, Zhang Yimou invited Jiang to serve as choreographer for the opera Liu Sanjie. Despite changes in project investors, Chiang completed the second draft and attended a press conference but lost contact with the production team afterward. In 2004, she learned that Impression Liu Sanjie, a live-action performance, had premiered in Guilin, and news reports mentioned her as the dance director. Feeling deceived, Jiang demanded payment according to her contract. Producer Mei Shuaiyuan stated that the two productions were unrelated and that earlier reports were incorrect. He claimed to have privately compensated Jiang with 50,000 yuan. Zhang Yimou promised to assist in resolving the issue, but no further action was reported.

In 2008, Jiang choreographed, directed, and designed sets for the opera Tea at the National Centre for the Performing Arts in Beijing, with Tan Dun composing the music. However, Jiang was outraged that the poster displayed her name only in English ("Chiang") without the Chinese characters. She refused to appear on stage for the curtain call after the performance. That same year, she collaborated with musician Liu Sola on a German stage play, which portrayed Mao Zedong’s wife, Jiang Qing, as a young woman ambitiously striving for power.

In 2020, Jiang was invited by Ai Weiwei to choreograph a new version of Turandot in Rome. The production was postponed due to the COVID-19 pandemic, but finally premiered at the Rome Opera House from 22 to 31 March 2022.

== Family ==
- She married Liu Chia-chang in 1966 and divorced in 1970. They had a son.
- She married Birger Blombäck, a Swedish biochemist, in 1978. Blombäck died in 2008.
