= Wang Zhenhe =

Wang Zhenhe (Wang Chen-ho, Timothy Tsen-ho Wang, 王禎和) (1 October 1940 – 3 September 1990) was one of Taiwan's most famous writers. Wang's masterpiece is the comic novel Rose, Rose, I Love You (《玫瑰﹐玫瑰我愛你》), which is set in the coastal town of Hualien during the Vietnam War. The novel's plot centers on the efforts of the town's leaders to come together to set up a brothel to entertain a group of American GIs coming to Taiwan for R&R. Wang is considered the foremost representative of the nativist literature movement that swept Taiwan in the 1970s and 80s.

== Selected works in translation ==
- Rose, Rose, I Love You. Translated by Howard Goldblatt. New York: Columbia University Press. April 1998. ISBN 978-0-231-11202-4.

== List of works ==
- The Oxcart for Dowry (1969)
