= Liu Chia-chang =

Taiwanese songwriter (1943–2024)

Steven Liu Chia-chang
- 劉家昌
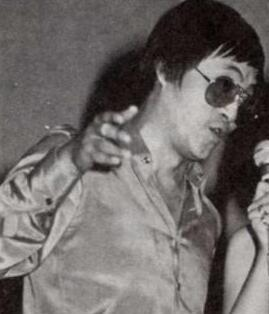
- Liu in 1980
- Born: Liu Chia-chang; 13 April 1940 or 13 April 1943; Harbin, Binjiang Province, Manchukuo
- Died: 2 December 2024 (aged 81 or 84); Taipei, Taiwan
- Education: National Chengchi University
- Occupations: Songwriter, singer, screenwriter, director, actor
- Years active: 1968–1980
- Spouses: Chiang Ching (m. 1966; div. 1970) Chen Chen (m. 1978; div. 1987)
- Children: Liu Ji-peng (son), with Chiang Ching; Jeremy Liu (son), with Chen Chen

Chinese name
- Traditional Chinese: 劉家昌
- Simplified Chinese: 刘家昌
Transcriptions
Standard Mandarin
- Hanyu Pinyin: Liú Jiāchāng

Steven Liu Chia-chang (traditional Chinese: 劉家昌; simplified Chinese: 刘家昌; pinyin: Liú Jiāchāng; 13 April 1940 or 13 April 1943 – 2 December 2024) was a Taiwanese songwriter, singer, screenwriter, director, and actor.

== Personal life ==
Liu was born in Harbin, Manchukuo. He and his mother left China via Hong Kong to escape the resumed Chinese Civil War. However, Liu's upbringing in Korea was affected by the Korean War. Unlike his two elder sisters, Liu never took music lessons. After arriving in Taiwan, Liu graduated from National Hsinchu Senior High School, then attended National Chengchi University from 1962 to 1964, dropping out to pursue a career in entertainment.

Liu married actress and dancer Chiang Ching in 1966 and later had a son Liu Ji-chen (劉繼成), who would later be renamed to Liu Ji-peng (劉繼鵬). Liu and Chiang divorced in 1970.

In 1978, Liu married Chen Chen, an actress and former wife of Patrick Tse, they later had a son Jeremy Liu on 21 April 1986, who would later become a singer. Liu and Chen Chen divorced in 1987 soon after. Liu died of cancer in Taipei on 2 December 2024.

== Discography ==
Liu wrote songs such as "Ode to the Republic of China" and "The Plum Blossom", and collaborated with famous singers such as Fei Yu-ching ("Goodnight Song"), Liu Wen-cheng ("Promise"), Judy Ongg ("Sea Gull"), and Teresa Teng ("On the West Tower Alone"). At the 12th Golden Melody Awards in 2001, Liu received the Lifetime Contribution Award.

== Filmography ==
Liu wrote and directed Feng shui er shi nian (风水二十年, 1983), a Hong Kong-Taiwanese film alternately titled in English, The Lost Generation, and titled worldwide in English, Women in Love. Liu's Love Begins Here won the Golden Horse Awards for Best Narrative Feature and Best Musical in 1973, and in 1976, Victory won Best Narrative Feature, Best Screenplay, Best Cinematography, Best Sound Recording and Best Musical at the 13th Golden Horse Awards.
