= Meinong District =

District in Kaohsiung, Taiwan

Coordinates: 22.890093°N 120.566883°E

Meinong 美濃區 Mino
- District
- Meinong District
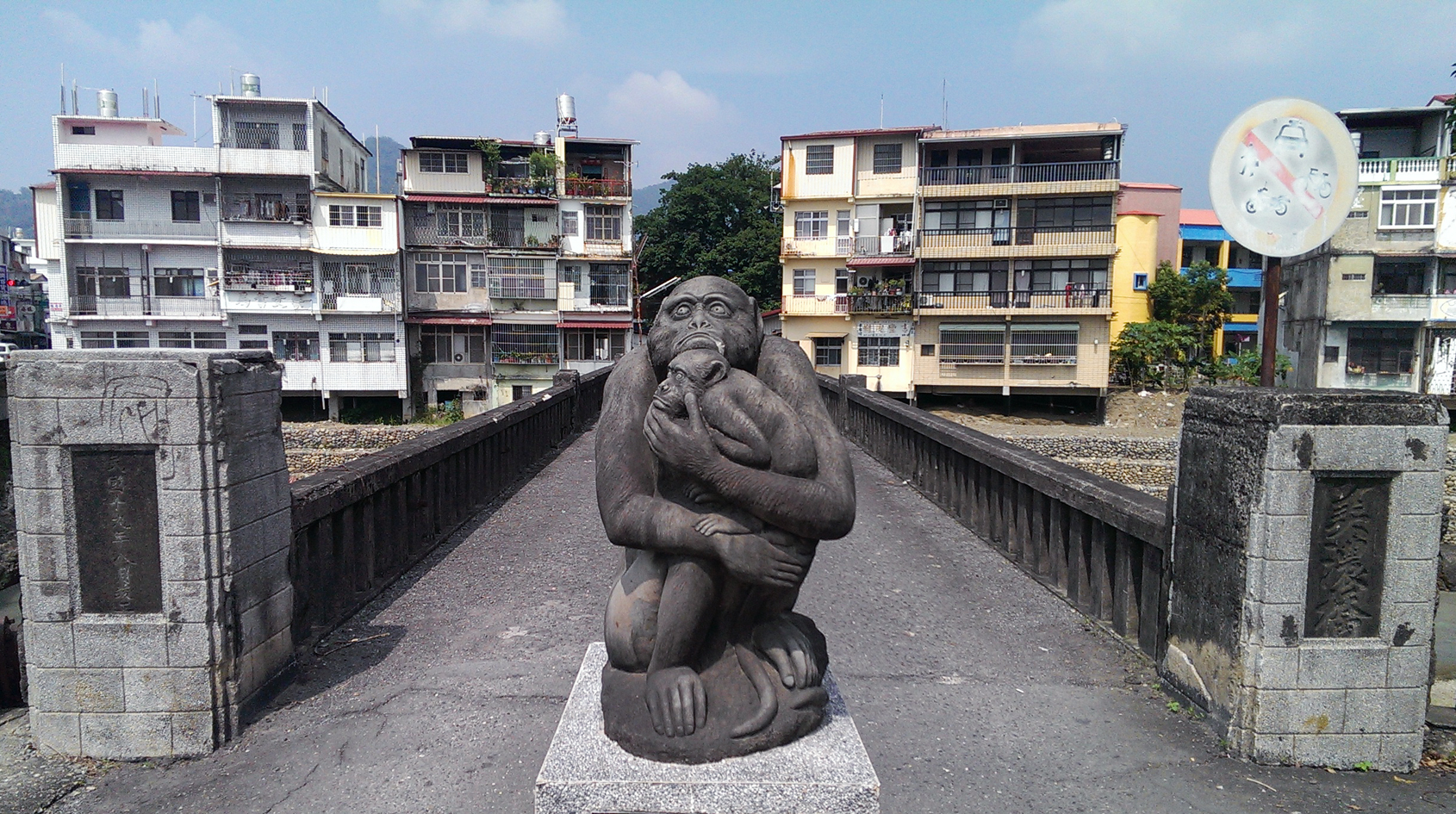
- Meinong District

- Meinong District in Kaohsiung City
- Country: Taiwan
- Region: Southern Taiwan

Population (October 2023)
  - Total: 37,092
- Website: meinong-en.kcg.gov.tw

Meinong District (WG: Meinung, Hakka: 瀰濃 Mî-nùng, Chinese: 美濃區; pinyin: Měinóng Qū) is a Hakka district in Kaohsiung, Taiwan. Meinong is one of the four districts in Kaohsiung that is the central focus of Hakka cultural development, the others being Jiasian District, Shanlin District, and Liouguei District. In March 2012, it was named one of the "Top 10 Small Tourist Towns" by the Tourism Bureau.

== Name ==
During Japanese rule, the name was changed from "Mî-nùng" (瀰濃/彌濃) to Mino (美濃). "Mî-nùng" may have come from the name of a local aboriginal tribe, "Malang".

== History ==
After the handover of Taiwan from Japan to the Republic of China in 1945, Meinong was organized as an urban township of Kaohsiung County. On 25 December 2010, Kaohsiung County was merged with Kaohsiung City and Meinong was upgraded to a district of the city.

== Geography ==
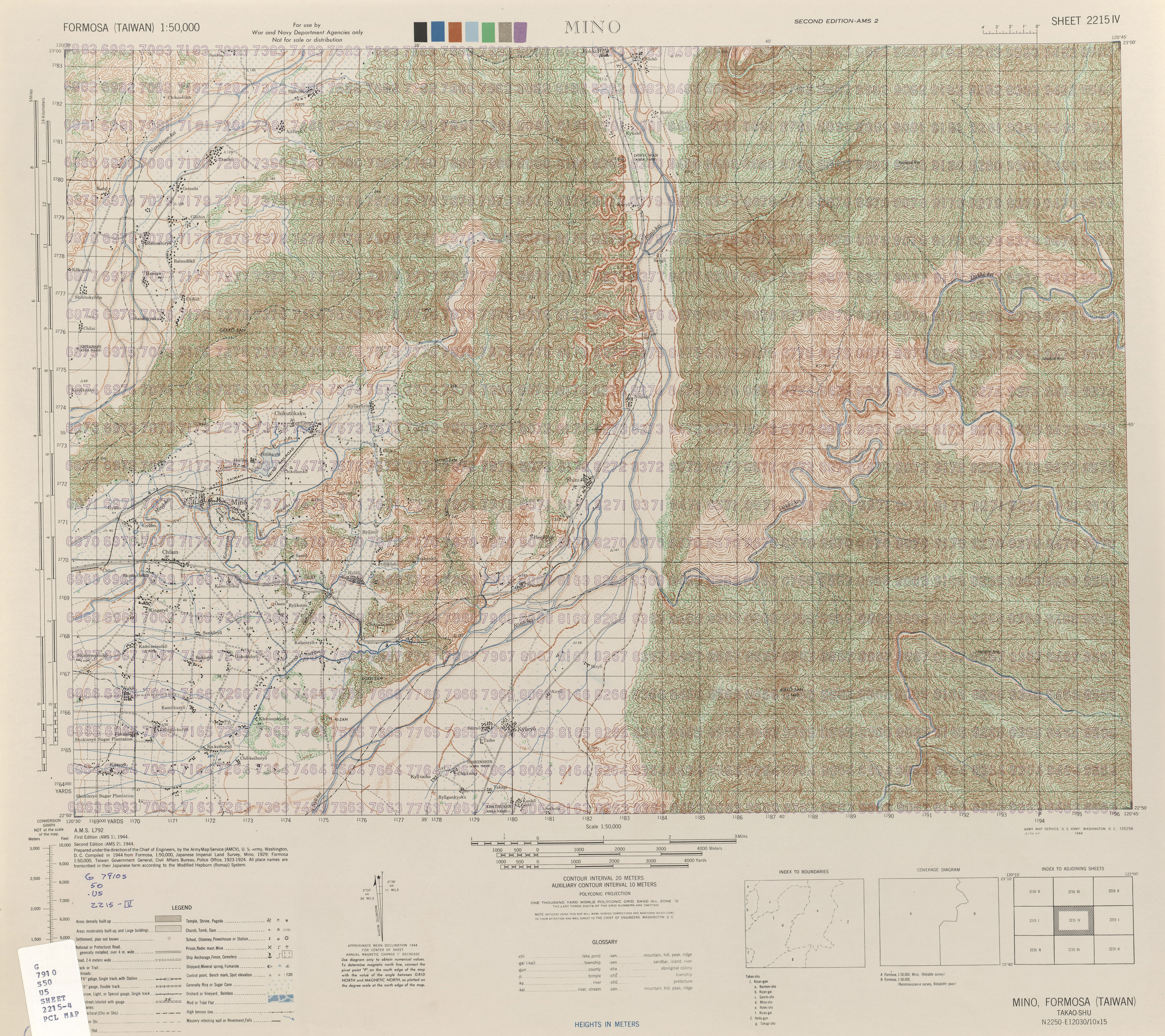
Map of Meinong (labeled as Minō) area (1944)

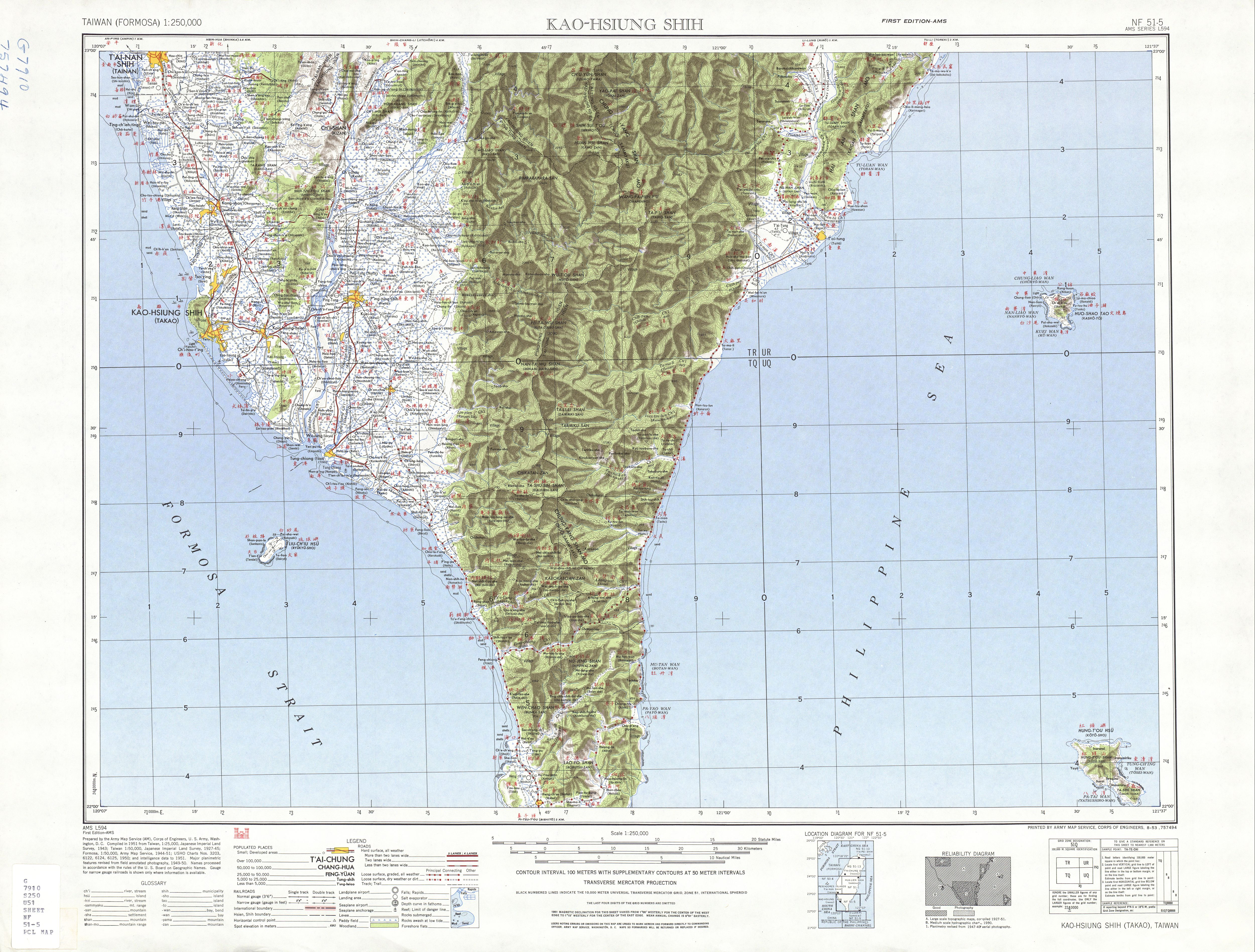
Map of the region including Meinong (labeled as Mei-nung (Minō) 美農 [sic]) (1951)

- Area: 120.0316 km^{2}.
- Population: 37,092 (October 2023)
- Postal Code: 843
- Households: 15,065 (October 2023)

== Administrative divisions ==
The district is divided into 19 urban villages and 389 neighborhoods. Villages in the district are Fu'an, Gehe, Luxing, Zhongtan, Dexing, Longshan, Shishan, Longdu, Guangde, Xinglong, Zhongzun, Tungmen, Taian, Minong, Qingshui, Jiyang, Jihe, Jitung and Guanglin Village.

== Economy ==
The area has grown tobacco since 1630 and is renowned nationwide for its oil paper umbrellas. These oil paper umbrellas are made mainly by the Hakka population and exported to Japan.

== Education ==
- Kaomei College of Health Care and Management

There is one senior high school in Meinong District, which is Kaohsiung Private Qimei Senior Commercial and Industrial Vocational School; three national middle schools, namely Kaohsiung Meinong National Middle School, Kaohsiung City Nanlong National Middle School, Kaohsiung City Longdu National Middle School; nine National Primary Schools There are Meinong National Elementary School in Meinong District, Kaohsiung City, Jidong National Elementary School in Meinong District, Kaohsiung City, Dongmen National Elementary School in Meinong District, Kaohsiung City, Guangxing National Elementary School in Meinong District, Kaohsiung City, Longdu National Elementary School in Meinong District, Kaohsiung City, and Meinong City, Kaohsiung City . District Zhongtan National Primary School, Kaohsiung City Meinong District Jiyang National Primary School, Kaohsiung City Meinong District Fu'an National Primary School, Kaohsiung City Meinong District Longshan National Primary School .

== Infrastructure ==
- Jhumen Power Plant

== Tourist attractions ==
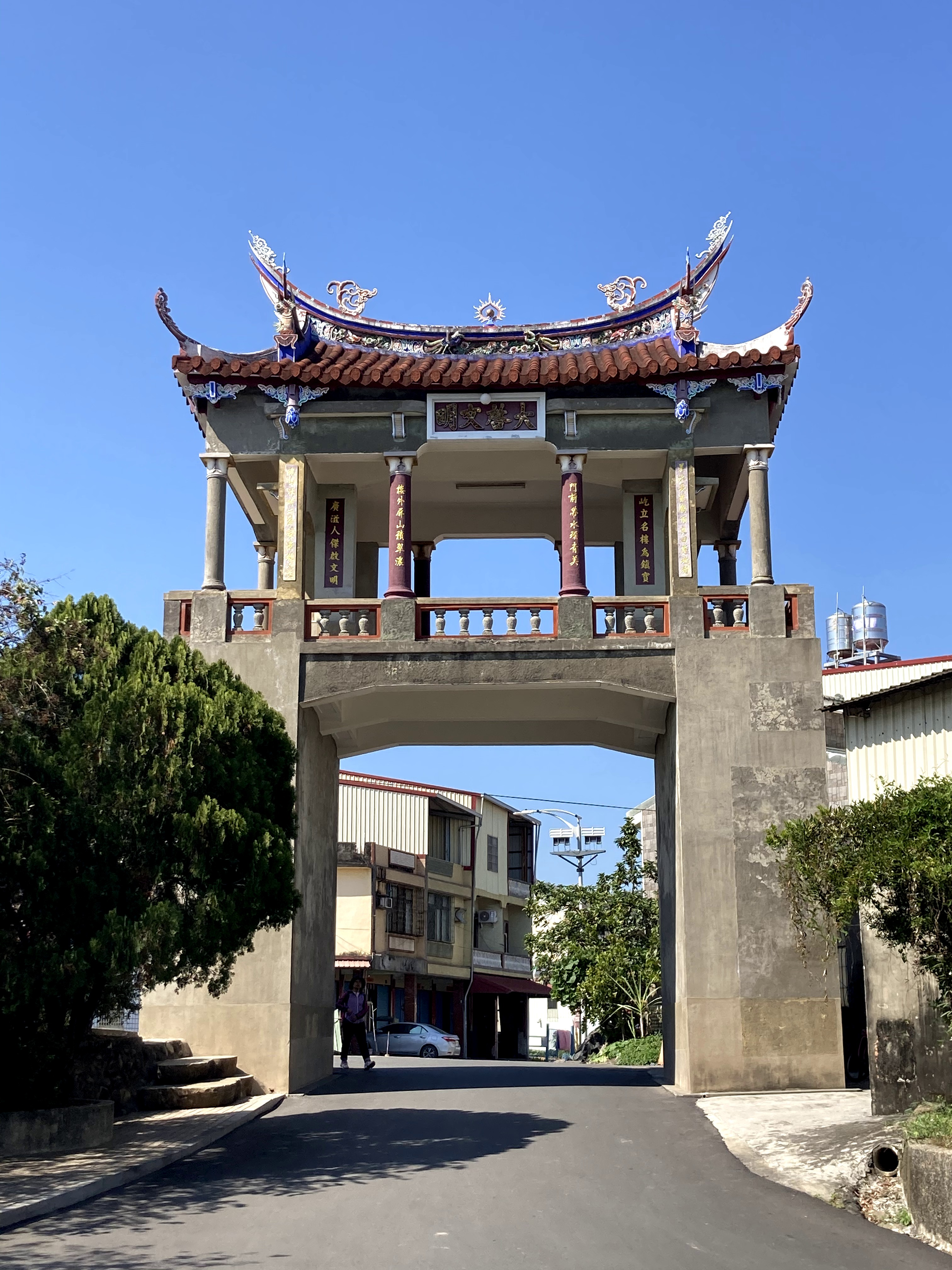
Meinong East Gate Tower

- Chung Li-ho Museum
- God of Earth
- Guangshan Temple (美濃廣善堂)
- Jhaoyuan Buddhist Temple (朝元寺)
- Jhong Lihe Memorial Institute and Footpath of Taiwanese Literature
- Lin Chun-yu Gatehouse
- Literature Pavilion
- Meinong Cultural and Creative Center
- Meinong East Gate Tower
- Meinong Folk Village
- Meinong Hakka Culture Museum
- Meinong Lake
- Mount Jian
- Mount Ling
- Mount Yueguang
- Shuangsi Tropical Viviparous Forest
- Siajhuang Bridge
- Tobacco Towers
- Tseng Wen-chung Fine Arts Museum
- Word-worshipping Paper Incinerator
- Yellow Butterfly Valley
- Yong-an Old Street
- Yuan Siang Yuan Paper Umbrella Culture Village

== Notable natives ==
- Zhong Lihe, Hakka fiction writer of international importance (See Chung Li-ho) (1915-1960)
- Lin Shengxiang 林生祥, social-environmental activist, globally important (Hakka) folk-rock-fusion singer-songwriter
- Lee Yung-te, Minister of Culture
- Lin Hsiang-nung, Minister of the Council of Agriculture (1999–2000)
- Wu Chin-fa, vice chairman of the Council of Cultural Affairs (2004–2008)
- Yang Hung-duen, Minister of Science and Technology (2016–2017)

== See also ==
- Kaohsiung
