= Victory (1976 film) =

- Video cover art
- Chinese: 梅花
- Literal meaning: Plum Blossom
- Hanyu Pinyin: Méihuā
- Directed by: Liu Chia-chang
- Written by: Teng Yu-kun
- Produced by: Mei Chang-ling; Wong Cheuk-hon
- Starring: Ko Chun-hsiung; Sylvia Chang; Terry Hu; Tsui Fu-sheng; Tien Niu
- Cinematography: Lin Hung-chung; Lin Tsan-ting; Cheung Sai-gwan
- Edited by: Hsieh I-hsiung; Wang Chin-chen
- Music by: Liu Chia-chang
- Production company: Central Motion Pictures Corporation
- Release date: 28 May 1976 (Taiwan)
- Country: Taiwan
- Language: Mandarin

Victory is a 1976 Taiwanese war film directed by Liu Chia-chang, set in the Second Sino-Japanese War. The film won 5 awards at the 1976 Golden Horse Film Festival and Awards, including Best Feature Film.

== Cast ==
- Ko Chun-hsiung
- Sylvia Chang
- Terry Hu
- Tsui Fu-sheng
- Tien Niu
