= Chen Chen (actress) =

Taiwanese actress

- 甄珍
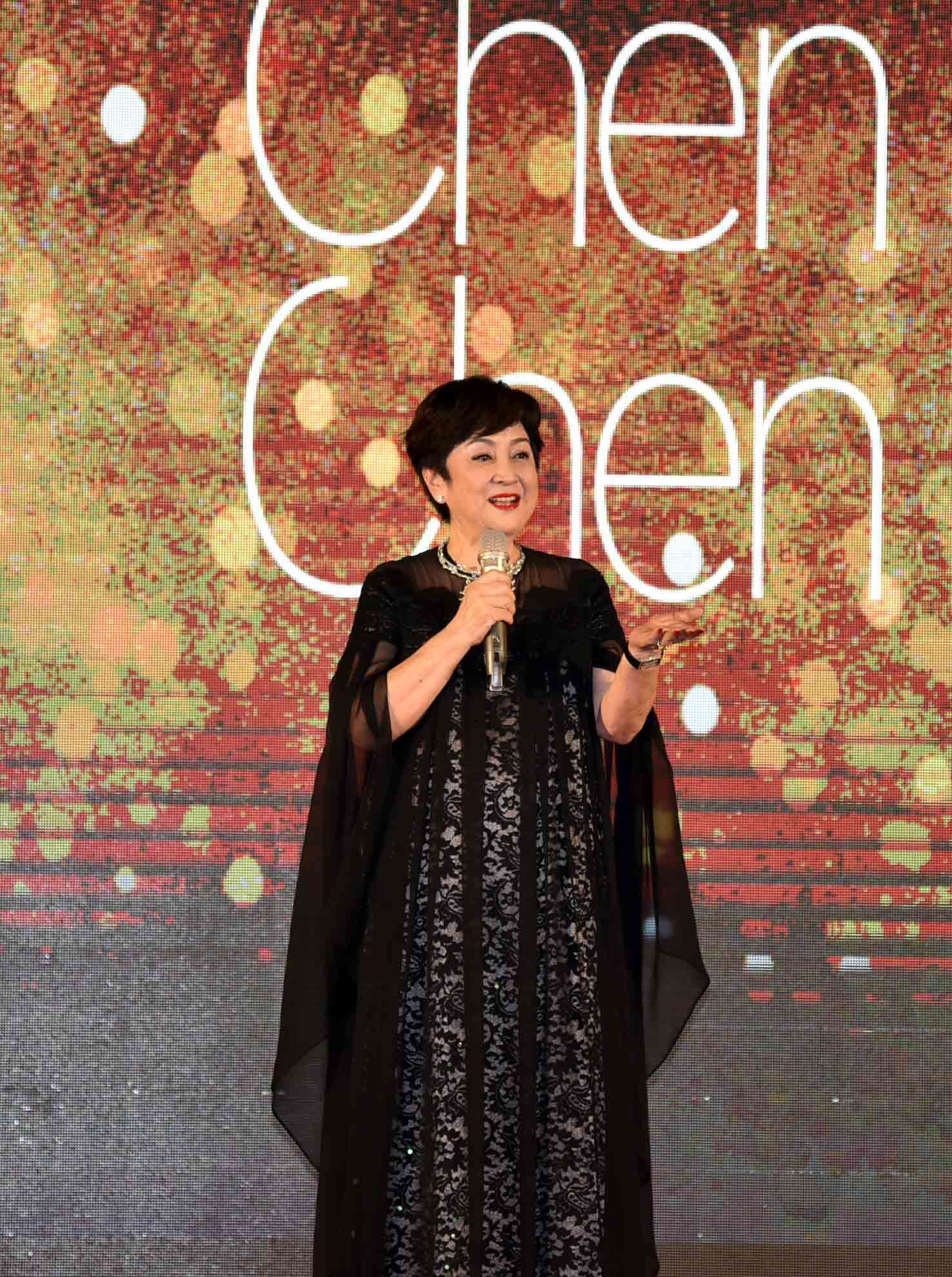
- Born: Chang Chia-Chen; July 17, 1948 (age 78); Beiping, Republic of China
- Occupation: Actress
- Spouse(s): Patrick Tse (m. 1974; div. 1976) Steven Liu (m. 1979; div. 1987)
- Children: Jeremiah Zhang (son)
- Parents: Chang Pei-Lin (father); Chang Feng-Qin (mother)

Chen Chen (Chinese: 甄珍; pinyin: Zhēn Zhēn; July 17, 1948), born Chang Chia-Chen (Chinese: 章家珍; pinyin: Zhāng Jiāzhēn) is a Taiwanese actress active in the late 1960s and 1970s. From 1966 to 1986 Chen Chen has starred in about 90 movies. Her work was in a range of genres, from Taiwan's literary romance films (愛情文藝片; Aiqing Wenyi Pian) to patriotic films, and earned her various accolades, including two Best Actress awards at the Asian Pacific Film Festival. In 2013, Chen Chen received a Lifetime Achievement Award at the 50th Golden Horse Awards.

== Early life ==
Originally named Chang Chia-Chen, Chen Chen was born on July 17, 1948, in Beiping (now Beijing). Her grandfather, Chang Hong-Chun (章鴻春), was the principal of the Army Cavalry School of the Republic of China. Her father, Colonel Chang Pei-Lin (章沛霖), was a Japanese Army Non-Commissioned Officer Academy graduate. He served as the military attaché of the Embassy of the Republic of China in Japan and later became an entrepreneur after moving to the United States. Chen's mother, Chang Feng-Qin (張鳳琴), was a high school music teacher. Chen has two siblings, a younger sister named Chang Jia-Xing (章家興), also known as Yin Xia (銀霞), who is a folk singer in the 1980s, and a younger brother.

Chen was three months old when her family moved to Taiwan. When she was five, they moved to Japan because her father was assigned to the Embassy of the Republic of China in Japan. Chen learned ballet at a young age and performed publicly. Later, she studied ethnic dance, which can be seen in the opera film Four Season Blooming Flowers (四季花開/富貴花開; 1972). Chen returned to Taiwan with her family when she was eleven. She attended Jinling Girls' Middle School in 1959 before transferring to Taibei Senior High School. She also studied dance at the Chinese Culture University’s 5-year program, which she did not complete.

== Career ==
=== Grand Motion Pictures Co., Ltd. ===
After Li Han-hsiang completed The Love Eterne in 1963, he had a conflict with the Shaw Brothers Pictures International Limited. He then left Hong Kong and established the Grand Motion Pictures Co., Ltd. in Taiwan in 1964. In the company’s first recruitment of new actors and actresses, Chen Chen was the only one selected out of more than 3000 applicants.

In 1966, Chen Chen made her very first silver screen debut in a period film, A Perturbed Girl (天之驕女). Soon after, she was listed as one of the “Five Phoenixes of Grand” (Chinese: 國聯五鳳; pinyin: Quo Lian Wu Feng) along with Jiang Qing (江青), Wang Ling (汪玲), Niu Fangyu (鈕方雨), and Li Denghui (李登惠).

Due to financial difficulties, the Grand Motion Pictures Co., Ltd. closed in 1967, and Chen Chen signed a contract with Central Motion Pictures Corporation. She became well known for her leading role in The Bride and I (新娘與我).

=== Literary romance films ===
In 1972, Chen Chen took on the leading role in a cinematic adaptation of Xuan Xiaofo's (玄小佛) novel Love in a Fallen City (白屋之戀). The film kickstarted a trend of Literary Romantic films for over a decade, mostly adapted from romantic novels by Qiong Yao and other writers.

The 1973 film The Young Ones (彩雲飛), directed by Li Hsing, starring Chen Chen and Alan Tang again. In the film Chen Chen plays two roles, twin sisters separated since birth. The film was ranked sixth in Taiwan's box office that year (earning 3.08 million NTD) and made Chen and Tang the most beloved on-screen couple of the early 1970s.

Chen Chen was paired with a new actor Charlie Chin in Li Hsing's next adaptation of Qiong Yao's novel The Heart Has A Thousand Knots (心有千千結) in the same year (1973), which made Charlie Chin a household name as one of the leading stars in Literary Romantic films. With the same cast and crew from the previous film The Young Ones (彩雲飛), Li Hising's Where the Seagull Flies in the following year (1974) proved to be a bigger success in box office: the second highest in Taipei of the year with a gross of 8.5 million NTD.

== Personal life ==
In 1971, Chen Chen starred in director Li Han-hsiang's The Story of Ti-Ying (緹縈) and fell in love with the male lead Patrick Tse. On March 22, 1974, after more than three years of dating, the two secretly registered their marriage in Hong Kong. On June 1, 1976, Chen signed divorce papers with Tse and began dating Steven Liu.

In December 1978, Chen Chen went to the United States with Liu. On January 24, 1979, they had a notarized marriage in Las Vegas. She retired from the film industry in 1984, having appeared in a total of 85 films.

On April 21, 1986, Chen Chen gave birth to her son, Jeremiah Zhang (originally named Zi Qian Liu). On August 31, 1987, Chen Chen and Liu were divorced, which was not announced until it was revealed in 2015.

== Filmography ==
Year	Chinses Title	English title
1966	《天之驕女》	A Perturbed Girl
1966	《幾度夕陽紅》	Many Enchanting Nights
1966	《明月幾時圓》	When Dreams Come True
1966	《遠山含笑》	Deep in the Mountain
1967	《鳳陽花鼓》	Feng Yang Flower Drum
1967	《陌生人》	The Stranger
1969	《今天不回家》	Accidental Trio
1969	《新娘與我》	The Bride and I
1970	《群星會》	Stardust
1970	《行行出狀元》	Hang Hang Chu Zhuang Yuan/ Every Jobs Has Its Master
1970	《吾愛吾妻》	Wu Ai Wu Qi/ I Love My Wife
1970	《喜怒哀樂》	Four Moods
1970	《百萬新娘》	Million Dollar Bride
1971	《最短的婚禮》	The Shortest Wedding
1971	《緹縈》	The Story of Ti-Ying
1971	《騙術奇談》	Legends of Cheating
1971	《愛你一萬倍》	Love Is Splendid Thing
1972	《喜從天上來》	Bliss from heaven
1972	《白屋之戀》	Love in A Cabin
1972	《祇羨鴛鴦不羨仙》	The Admarid Girl
1972	《珮詩》	Pei Shih
1972	《騙術大觀》	Cheating Panorama
1972	《淘氣夫妻》	The Naughty Couples
1972	《黑吃黑》	The Cannibals
1973	《明日天涯》	If Tomorrow Comes
1973	《心有千千結》	Heart With A Million Knots
1973	《彩雲飛》	The Young Ones
1973	《天使之吻》	Angel Kiss
1973	《騙術奇中奇》	Cheat to Cheat
1974	《英烈千秋》	The Everlasting Glory
1974	《富貴花開》	Flowers in All Seasons
1974	《婚姻大事》	The Marriage
1974	《我心深處》	Wo Xin Shen Chu/ Deep in My Heart
1974	《一年幽夢》	One Years Fantasy
1974	《一簾幽夢》	Fantasies Behind the Pearly Curtain
1974	《冬戀》	The Splendid Love in Winter
1974	《晴時多雲偶陣雨》	How Is The Weather Today?
1974	《海鷗飛處》	Where the Seagull Flies
1974	《台北頑皮貓》	Tai Bei Wan Pi Mao/ Naughty Cat in Taipei
1974	《星星星》	Star Star Star
1975	《金粉神仙手》	The Girl with the Dexterous Touch
1975	《盲女奇緣》	Black Alice
1976	《未講完的故事》	Wei Jiang Wan De Gu Shi/ An Unfinished Story
1976	《大富人家》	Born Rich
1976	《愛在夏威夷》	Ai Zai Xia Wei Yi/ Love in Hawaii
1976	《哈哈笑》	Laugh In

== Awards and honors ==
Year	Award	Category	Work	Outcome
1971	Asian Pacific Film Festival	Best Leading Actress	The Story of Ti-Ying	Won
1974	Asian Pacific Film Festival	Best Leading Actress	The Splendid Love in Winter	Won
1978	Golden Horse Awards	Best Leading Actress	The Glory of the Sunset	Nominated
2013	Golden Horse Awards	Lifetime Achievement Award		Won
