= Li Hsing =

Taiwanese film director (1930–2021)

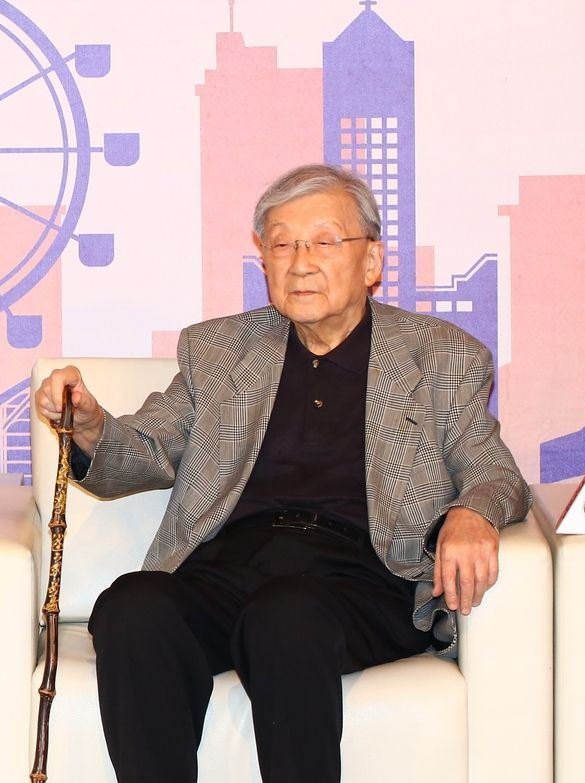
- Born: 20 May 1930; Shanghai, China
- Died: 19 August 2021 (aged 91); Taipei, Taiwan
- Occupation: Film director
- Years active: 1959–1986

Li Hsing or Lee Hsing (李行) was a Taiwanese film director. He was born Lee Tz-da (李子達) in 1930 in Shanghai and died in 2021. He made one of the early popular Taiwanese films in the late 1959, Wang and Liu Tour Taiwan (王哥柳哥遊台灣), though he did not speak Taiwanese. He was also the key director in the promotion of Healthy Realist film (健康寫實片) and Literary Romantic film (愛情文藝片). He was awarded the best director at Golden Horse Awards three times and had seven films awarded the best feature film: Beautiful Duckling (養鴨人家; 1965), The Road (路; 1967), Execution in Autumn (秋決; 1972), Land of the Undaunted, (吾土吾民; 1975), He Never Gives Up (汪洋中的一條船; 1978), The Story of a Small Town (小城故事; 1979), and Good Morning, Taipei (早安台北; 1979). After he made his last film The Heroic Pioneers (唐山過台灣; 1986), he vowed to be the lifetime volunteer for the promotion of development of Taiwan cinema. In 2009 he established the Cross-Strait Films Exchange Committee, which has been the main, if not only, organization promoting the interaction and cooperation of Taiwanese and Chinese filmmakers. Lee Hsing is often referred to as the "godfather of Taiwan cinema" for his great contribution to Taiwan cinema.

== Career ==
Li Hsing graduated from Taiwan Provincial Normal College (台灣省立師範學院; now National Taiwan Normal University) in 1952. After military service he got a teaching position in the high school of his alma mater and was interested in theater performance. He tried to apply to become an actor in Central Motion Picture Corporation (CMPC; 中央電影公司) but was rejected. He was married to his college classmate Wang Wei-jin (王為瑾) in 1955. He acted in many films and often also served as the assistant director between 1955 and 1958, such as The Assault (血戰; 1958).

In 1958 Li Hsing directed his first film, a Taiwanese-language comic film Brother Wang and Brother Liu Tour Taiwan though he did not speak the language. The film features a similar pair of characters like Laurel and Hardy and was released as two installments. They were so popular that it spun many more with the same pair of actors with similar titles, directed by Li Hsing and others.

In 1963 Li Hsing began to make his first mandarine film Our Neighbor (街頭巷尾). He was hired by CMPC and co-directed the first color feature film Oyster Girl (蚵女), which together with Beautiful Duckling become the representative films of the "Healthy Realism" (健康寫實主義) promoted by CMPC. Li Hsing then began to adopt short stories by Qiong Yao (瓊瑤) and made Wan Chun (婉君表妹; 1965) and The Silent Wife (啞女情深; 1965).

Li Hsing formed his own film production company Ta Chung Motion Picture Co., Ltd. (大眾電影公司) with Pai Jing-rui (白景瑞), Lai Cheng-ying (賴成英), and several other film colleagues and friends. Among other films, he directed three extremely popular films adapted from Qiong Yao's novels in 1973 and 1974 and started the wave of Literary Romantic genre: The Young Ones (彩雲飛; 1973), The Heart with a Million Knots (心有千千結; 1973), and Where the Sea Gull Flies (海鷗飛處; 1974), all starring Chen Chen (甄珍). He later made two more films adapted from Qiong Yao's novel, Posterity and Perplexity (碧雲天; 1976) and Painted Waves of Love (浪花; 1976), before breaking up with her for good.

Li Hsing's other representative films include: He Never Gives Up, a film about the inspiring life of a handicapped man, The Story of a Small Town, about a love story in the small town Sanyi in central Taiwan, Good Morning, Taipei, about how a car accident changed the life of a young college student, and My Native Land (原鄉人; 1980), about the life of writer Chung Li-he (鍾理和). The last film he made is The Heroic Pioneers, released in 1986.

Li Hsing was the first chairperson of the Association of Film Directors of the Republic of China (中華民國導演協會), which was founded in 1989. He was selected to be the chairperson of Taipei Golden Horse Film Festival Executive Committee (台北金馬國際影展執行委員會) by The Motion Picture Foundation, R.O.C. (中華民國電影事業發展基金會) in 1990. He received the Life Achievement Award at the 32nd Golden Horse Awards in 1995 and vowed to be a volunteer worker for the promotion of Taiwan cinema for the rest of his life. He lost his only son Lee Xian-yi (李顯一), who died in a car accident in 1996. In response to Lee Hsing's effort to promote the interaction and cooperation between filmmakers of Taiwan and Mainland China, the Motion Picture Foundation established Cross-Strait Films Exchange Committee (兩岸電影交流委員會), of which Li Hsing was the first chairperson. The committee has since then organized the annual Cross-Strait Film Festival (兩岸電影展), which is simultaneously held in Taiwan and Mainland China. Li Hsing died on August 19, 2021 at age 91.

== Filmography ==
Year	English title	Chinese title	Ref.
1959	Pigsy vs Monkey King	《豬八戒與孫悟空》	
1959	Pigsy Rescues vs Leopard	《豬八戒救美》	
1959	Brother Insy and Outsy	《凸哥凹哥》	
1959	Wang and Liu Tour Taiwan 1	《王哥柳哥遊台灣 上集》	
1959	Wang and Liu Tour Taiwan 2	《王哥柳哥遊台灣 下集》	
1961	Wang and Liu Have a Good New Year	《王哥柳哥好過年》	
1961	Good Neighbors	《兩相好》	
1962	Golden Phoenix and Silver Goose	《金鳳銀鵝》	
1962	The Liar Ah Chi	《白賊七》	
1962	Five Difficult Traps	《王哥柳哥過五關斬六將》	
1963	Our Neighbor	《街頭巷尾》	
1963	Oyster Girl	《蚵女》	
1965	Wan Chun	《婉君表妹》	
1965	The Silent Wife	《啞女情深》	
1965	Beautiful Duckling	《養鴨人家》	
1966	Fire Bulls	《還我河山》	
1966	The Monument of Virtue	《貞節牌坊》	
1967	Sun Rise, Sun Set	《日出日落》	
1967	The Road	《路》	
1970	Stardust	《羣星會》	
1970	Four Moods	《喜怒哀樂》	
1971	Love Styles XYZ	《愛情一二三》	
1971	Life with Mother	《母與女》	
1972	Execution in Autumn	《秋決》	
1973	The Young Ones	《彩雲飛》	
1973	The Heart with a Million Knots	《心有千千結》	
1974	The Three Tales	《大三元》	
1974	The Marriage	《婚姻大事》	
1974	Rhythm of the Wave	《海韻》	
1974	Where the Seagull Flies	《海鷗飛處》	
1975	Land of the Undaunted	《吾土吾民》	
1976	Posterity and Perplexity	《碧雲天》	
1976	Painted Waves of Love	《浪花》	
1977	Melody from Heaven	《白花飄雪花飄》	
1979	Good Morning, Taipei	《早安台北》	
1979	The Story of a Small Town	《小城故事》	
1979	He Never Gives Up	《汪洋中的一條船》	
1980	China, My Native Land	《原鄉人》	
1981	Another Spring	《又見春天》	
1983	The Wheel of Life	《大輪迴》	
1986	The Heroic Pioneers	《唐山過台灣》	

== Awards and honors ==
=== Golden Horse Awards ===
- 1965: Best Director for Beautiful Duckling
- 1972: Best Director for Execution in Autumn
- 1978: Best Director for He Never Gives Up
- 1979: Nominated for Best Director for The Story of a Small Town
- 1986: Nominated for Best Director for The Heroic Pioneers
- 1995: Special Award for Lifetime Achievement
