= Nine-Eared Hound =

Mythological Chinese dog

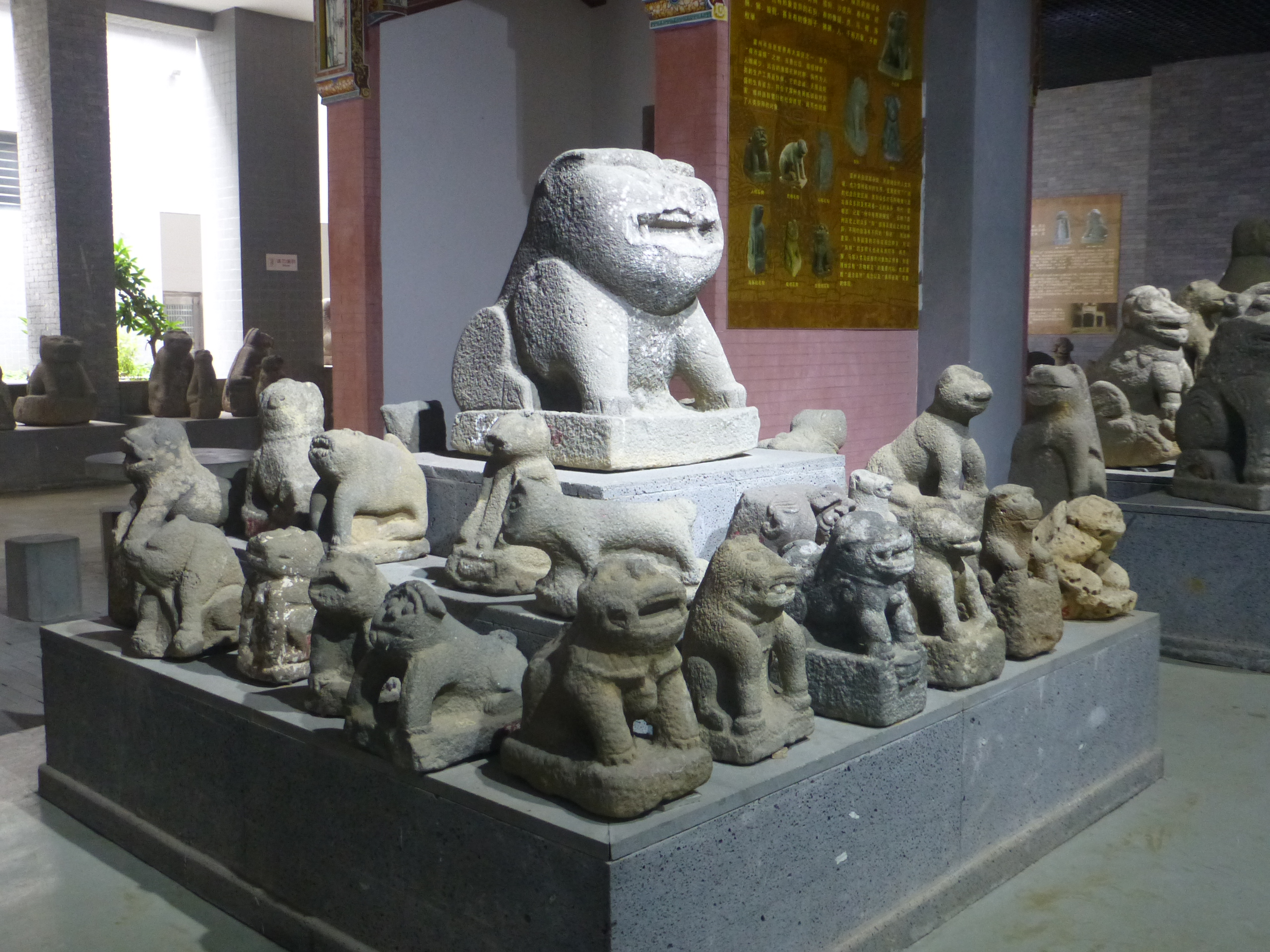
Various Leizhou stone dogs in the collection of Leizhou Museum.

The Nine-Eared Hound (Chinese: 九耳犬) is a legendary dog from the mythology of Leizhou Peninsula. In the earliest extant version of the myth, collected in Taiping Guangji (978) and dating from the Tang dynasty (618–907), it had twelve instead of nine ears.

== Story ==
One version of the myth is found in Chapter 12 of Yuan Mei's What the Master Would Not Discuss (1788). The Nine-Eared Hound belonged to a hunter surnamed Chen (陳). Before each hunting trip, the number of its ears that quivered accurately predicted the number of prey. One time, all its nine ears quivered but they did not catch anything all morning. "As Chen sank into disappointment, the dog suddenly walked over to the mountain ridge and barked loudly. It began scratching the ground with its claws and nodding its head as if calling Chen over." Chen found a huge egg and brought it home. The next day, during a thunderstorm, the egg cracked open, revealing a lovely baby. The boy grew up, passed the imperial examination and became the prefect of Leizhou (Lei Prefecture, literally "Thunder Prefecture"). He was capable and well-respected. At the age of fifty-seven, he suddenly rose high into the sky and disappeared; the people realized that he was the God of Thunder.

In another version, the baby had the characters "Leizhou" written in one palm and the characters "Chen Wenyu" written in the other, and Chen Wenyu became his name. Even today, the God of Thunder is known as Chen Wenyu in Leizhou, where local people of the Chen surname claimed descent from him. In another local legend, the dog became the companion for the God of Thunder.
