= 29 BC Yellow River flood =

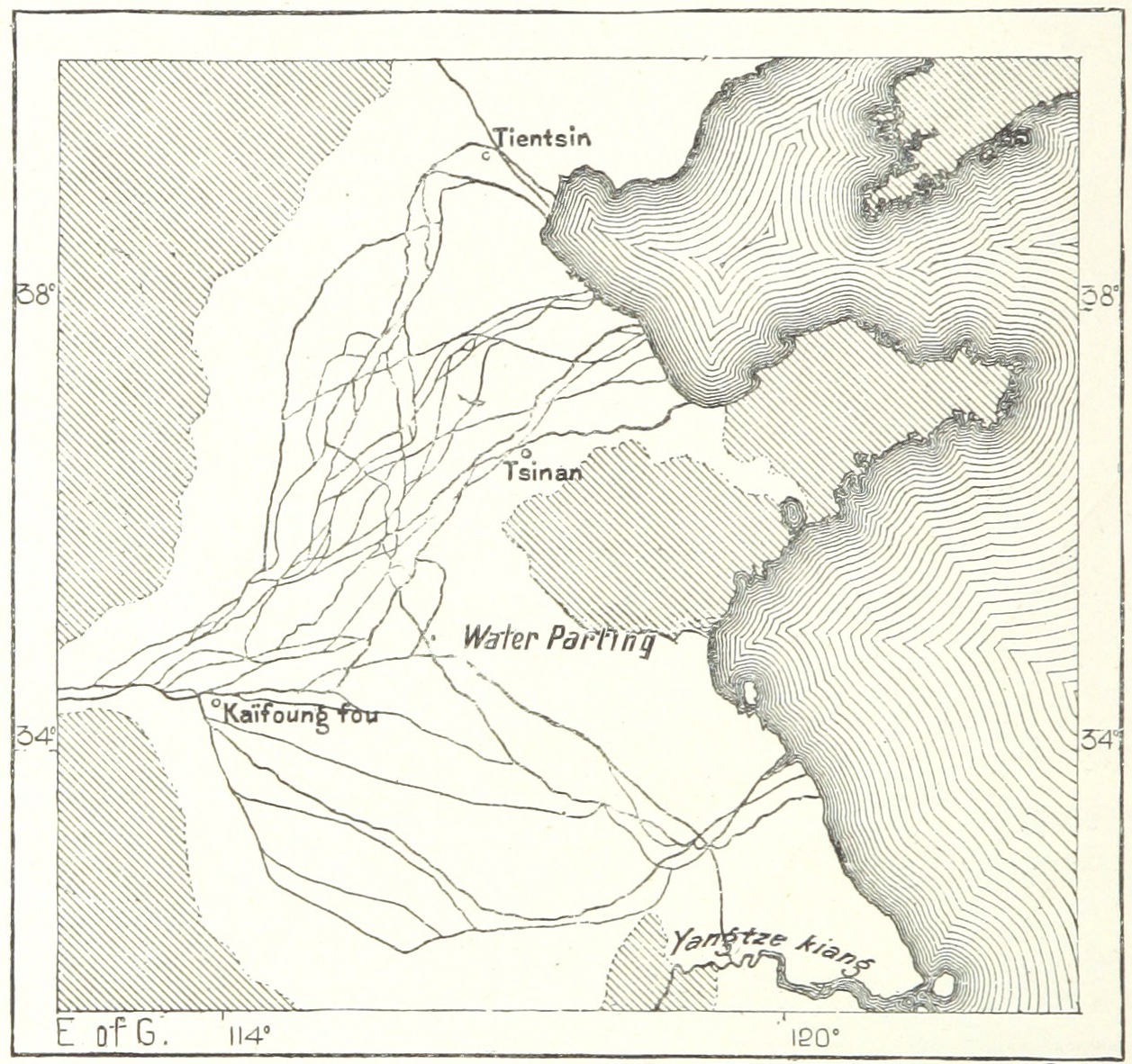
- A 19th-century map of the Yellow River's many courses. In 29 BC, its route again followed one of the paths just north of Shandong.
- Traditional Chinese: 前29年黃河洪水
- Simplified Chinese: 前29年黄河洪水
Transcriptions
Standard Mandarin
- Hanyu Pinyin: qián 29 nián Huánghé hóngshuǐ
- Wade–Giles: ch'ien 29 nien Huang Ho hung-shui

The 29 BC Yellow River flood was a flood of China's Yellow River in 29 BC during the reign of Emperor Liu Ao, posthumously known as the Cheng Emperor of the Western Han dynasty.

== History ==
The Yellow River has a long history of channel changes and disastrous floods in its lower reaches. Following the disastrous 132 BC flood, the Yellow River's dikes had been largely repaired by 109 BC, returning its course north of the Shandong Peninsula and out of the Si and Huai River beds. Additional channels and outlets were provided for the river from 95 to 66 BC but, over the course of the 1st century BC, Western Han officials paid insufficient attention to the need to dredge the river's main channel and to maintain flood control measures along its course. Another major outburst occurred in 39 BC.

During a period of worsening flooding, continuous heavy rains prompted plans to evacuate the imperial capital Chang'an in 30 BC. The next year, the Yellow River burst through the stone Jin Dike (金堤, Jīndī). Four commanderies were devastated and, under accusation of dereliction of duty, the chancellor Yin Zhong (尹忠, Yǐn Zhōng) died of suicide in disgrace. More than 2,000 years later, the incident was cited approvingly by the United Nations Department of Technical Cooperation for Development as an example of the appropriate seriousness with which major water mismanagement should be dealt.

The minister of agriculture mounted an immediate intervention, using 500 boats to rescue people stranded by the floodwaters. New dikes were then constructed by impressed laborers within 36 days, diverting the river's flow into additional side channels. The operation was memorialized by the Cheng Emperor as the beginning of a new era, the Era of River Pacification (河平, Hépíng, 28–25 BC). The new facilities withstood the next period of high water in 27 BC.

== See also ==
- Other floods of the Yellow River
