= Zhangwan =

Zhangwan may refer to the following locations in China:

- Zhangwan District (张湾区), Shiyan, Hubei
- Zhangwan Subdistrict, Caidian (张湾街道), Caidian District, Wuhan, Hubei
- Zhangwan Subdistrict, Xiangzhou (张湾街道), Xiangzhou District, Xiangyang, Hubei
- Zhangwan, Ningde (漳湾镇), town in Jiaocheng District, Ningde, Fujian
- Zhangwan, Dingtao County (张湾镇), town in Shandong
- Zhangwan Township, Shan County, Henan (张湾乡)
- Zhangwan Township, Donghai County (张湾乡), Jiangsu
- Zhangwan Township, Kaihua County (张湾乡), Zhejiang
- Zhangwan Village (张湾村), Mawan, Tianmen, Hubei
