= 39 BC Yellow River flood =

Natural disaster in China

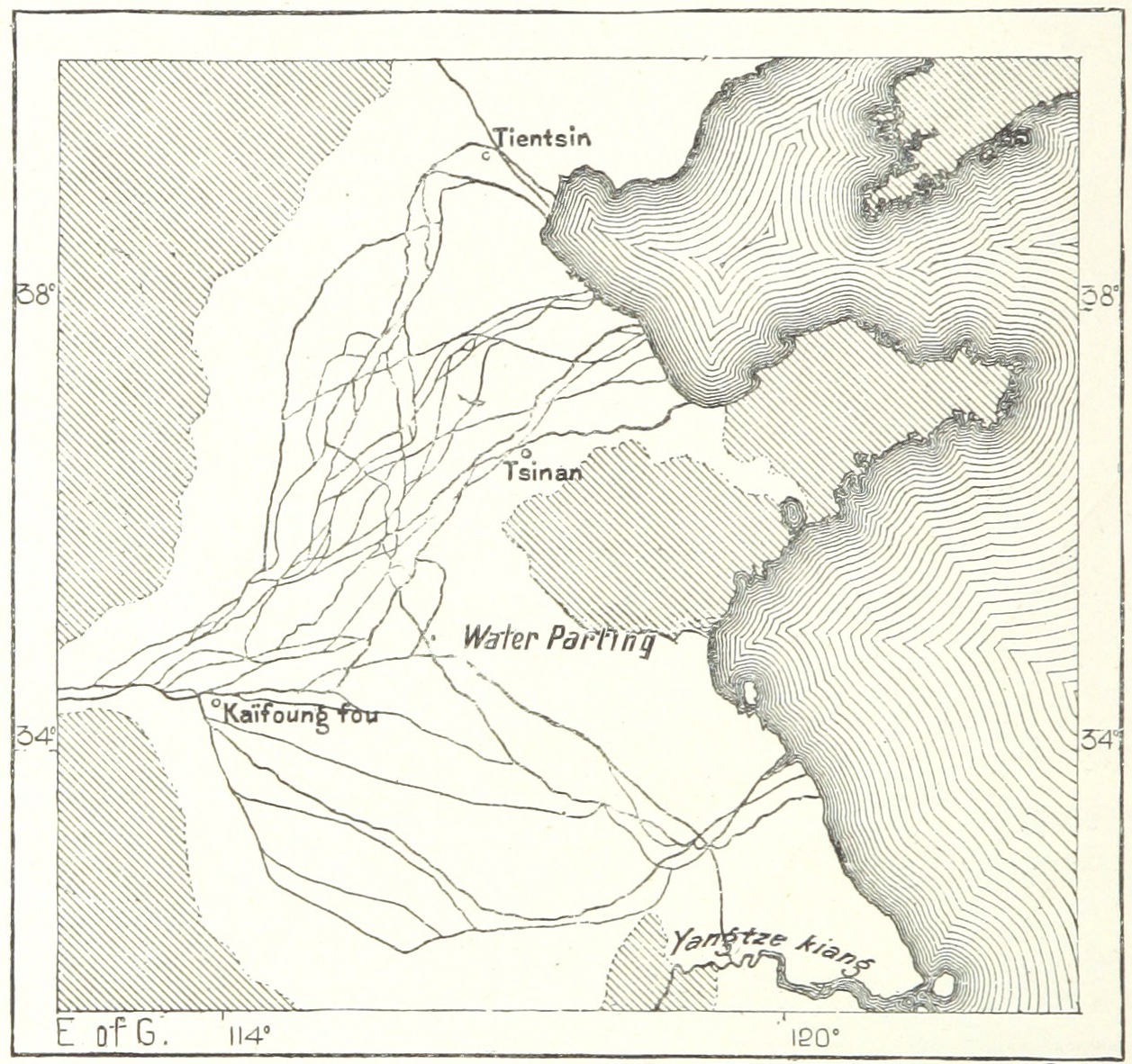
- A 19th-century map of the Yellow River's many courses. In 39 BC, its route again followed one of the paths just north of Shandong.
- Traditional Chinese: 前39年黃河洪水
- Simplified Chinese: 前39年黄河洪水
Transcriptions
Standard Mandarin
- Hanyu Pinyin: qián 39 nián Huánghé hóngshuǐ
- Wade–Giles: ch'ien 39 nien Huang Ho hung-shui

The 39 BC Yellow River flood was a flood of China's Yellow River in the year 39 BC during the reign of the emperor Liu Shi, posthumously known as the Yuan Emperor of the Western Han dynasty.

== History ==
Following the disastrous 132 BC flood, the Yellow River's dikes had been largely repaired by 109 BC, returning its course north of the Shandong Peninsula and out of the Si and Huai River beds. Additional channels and outlets were provided for the river from 95 to 66 BC but, over the course of the 1st century BC, Western Han officials paid insufficient attention to the need to dredge the river's main channel and to maintain flood control measures along its course. The 39 BC flood was a precursor to the still more disastrous flood ten years later.

== See also ==
- Other floods of the Yellow River
