= Kou Zhun =

Kou Zhun (寇準)
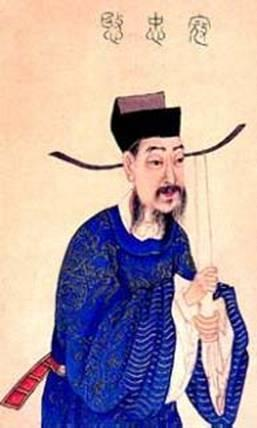
- from Famous Ministers Throughout History in Pictures (歷代名臣像解), a book probably from late 19th century

Grand councilor of the Song dynasty
- In office August 25, 1004 – March 27, 1006
- In office July 17, 1019 – July 9, 1020
- Monarch: Emperor Zhenzong of Song

Personal details
- Born: 961 or January 962; Hua Prefecture, Song dynasty
- Died: October 24, 1023 (aged 61–62); Lei Prefecture, Song dynasty
- Spouses: Lady Xu (許); Lady Song (宋)
- Children: 3 daughters
- Parents: Kou Xiang (寇相) (father); Lady Zhao (趙) (mother)
- Posthumous name: Zhongmin (忠愍)

Kou Zhun
- Traditional Chinese: 寇準
- Simplified Chinese: 寇准
Transcriptions
Standard Mandarin
- Hanyu Pinyin: Kòu Zhǔn
- Wade–Giles: K'ou^{4} Chun^{3}

Kou Pingzhong
- Chinese: 寇平仲
Transcriptions
Standard Mandarin
- Hanyu Pinyin: Kòu Píngzhòng

Kou Zhun (c. 961 – 24 October 1023), courtesy name Pingzhong, was a much-praised official of China's Northern Song dynasty. He was the chancellor from 1004 to 1006 during the Emperor Zhenzong's reign.

== Biography ==
Kou Zhun became a jinshi after passing the imperial examination in 979. Kou Zhun was a great speaker and had a reputation of offering criticism as he saw fit. Once, Emperor Taizong got offended and decided to leave, but Kou Zhun grabbed his robe and forced him to sit down and finish listening. Emperor Taizong remarked, "Having Kou Zhun is like Emperor Taizong of Tang having Wei Zheng."

In 1004, during Emperor Zhenzong's reign, the Liao forces from the North initiated a major invasion and came surprisingly close to the Song capital. When other officials such as Wang Qinruo suggested that the emperor desert the city and find a new capital in Southern China, Kou Zhun suggested the emperor come to the front line to boost the Song army's morale. Emperor Zhenzong listened to Kou Zhun's suggestion, and the Song forces successfully resisted the Liao invasion, ending in the Chanyuan Treaty.

Wang Qinruo, another Song official, was notably jealous of Kou Zhun and talked Emperor Zhenzong into distrusting Kou Zhun with words such as "Does my majesty know about gambling? When gamblers are about to lose everything, they take out all of their money for a last gamble. Kou Zhun was using your majesty as his stake (in that battle), which was incredibly dangerous." Soon Kou Zhun was banished from his post.
