= Dingtao, Heze =

Dingtao 定陶区 Tingtao
- District
- Location in Shandong
- Coordinates: 35°08′33″N 115°35′28″E
- Country: People's Republic of China
- Province: Shandong
- Prefecture-level city: Heze

Area
  - Total: 846 km^{2} (327 sq mi)

Population (2019)
  - Total: 533,400
  - Density: 630/km^{2} (1,630/sq mi)
- Postal Code: 274100

Dingtao District
- Traditional Chinese: 定陶區
- Simplified Chinese: 定陶区
Transcriptions
Standard Mandarin
- Hanyu Pinyin: Dìngtáo Qū
- Wade–Giles: Ting-t'ao Ch'u

Huzi
- Chinese: 瓠子
- Literal meaning: The Gourd
Transcriptions
Standard Mandarin
- Hanyu Pinyin: Hùzǐ
- Wade–Giles: Hu-tzu

Dingtao District is a district under the jurisdiction of Heze in Shandong province, China.

== History ==
Under the Western Han, Dingtao was known as Huzi. The emperor Liu Bang's ill-fated consort Qi was from this area, and it was the scene of a 132 BC flood of the Yellow River.

== Administrative divisions ==
As of 2012, this district is divided to 7 towns and 4 townships.

Towns

- Dingtao (定陶镇)
- Chenji (陈集镇)
- Rangu (冉固镇)
- Zhangwan (张湾镇)
- Huangdian (黄店镇)
- Menghai (孟海镇)
- Maji (马集镇)

Townships

- Fangshan Township (仿山乡)
- Nanwangdian Township (南王店乡)
- Bandi Township (半堤乡)
- Dutang Township (杜堂乡)

== Climate ==
Climate data for Dingtao, elevation 52 m (171 ft), (1991–2020 normals, extremes 1981–present)
Month	Jan	Feb	Mar	Apr	May	Jun	Jul	Aug	Sep	Oct	Nov	Dec	Year
Record high °C (°F)	18.9 (66.0)	25.1 (77.2)	27.4 (81.3)	32.4 (90.3)	36.9 (98.4)	39.9 (103.8)	40.7 (105.3)	36.2 (97.2)	35.6 (96.1)	34.3 (93.7)	27.1 (80.8)	20.3 (68.5)	40.7 (105.3)
Mean daily maximum °C (°F)	4.8 (40.6)	8.8 (47.8)	15.2 (59.4)	21.1 (70.0)	26.6 (79.9)	31.7 (89.1)	31.8 (89.2)	30.5 (86.9)	26.8 (80.2)	21.6 (70.9)	13.7 (56.7)	6.8 (44.2)	20.0 (67.9)
Daily mean °C (°F)	−0.4 (31.3)	3.2 (37.8)	9.3 (48.7)	15.2 (59.4)	20.8 (69.4)	25.7 (78.3)	27.1 (80.8)	25.7 (78.3)	21.1 (70.0)	15.5 (59.9)	8.0 (46.4)	1.6 (34.9)	14.4 (57.9)
Mean daily minimum °C (°F)	−4.2 (24.4)	−1.0 (30.2)	4.2 (39.6)	9.8 (49.6)	15.3 (59.5)	20.4 (68.7)	23.3 (73.9)	22.1 (71.8)	16.8 (62.2)	10.9 (51.6)	3.6 (38.5)	−2.4 (27.7)	9.9 (49.8)
Record low °C (°F)	−15.4 (4.3)	−15.2 (4.6)	−8.0 (17.6)	−1.2 (29.8)	4.2 (39.6)	11.1 (52.0)	16.8 (62.2)	11.4 (52.5)	5.7 (42.3)	−0.8 (30.6)	−11.4 (11.5)	−13.2 (8.2)	−15.4 (4.3)
Average precipitation mm (inches)	7.2 (0.28)	13.4 (0.53)	16.2 (0.64)	31.9 (1.26)	51.6 (2.03)	69.0 (2.72)	178.2 (7.02)	149.4 (5.88)	76.2 (3.00)	30.5 (1.20)	25.2 (0.99)	9.0 (0.35)	657.8 (25.9)
Average precipitation days (≥ 0.1 mm)	3.3	4.0	3.5	5.2	6.1	7.6	12.0	11.1	8.1	5.8	5.0	3.0	74.7
Average snowy days	3.5	2.9	0.6	0.2	0	0	0	0	0	0	0.8	1.9	9.9
Average relative humidity (%)	66	63	61	66	69	66	81	85	80	72	71	68	71
Mean monthly sunshine hours	133.7	148.0	201.0	219.9	240.6	226.6	199.8	191.4	178.5	167.3	151.7	143.1	2,201.6
Percentage possible sunshine	43	48	54	56	55	52	45	46	49	48	49	47	49
Source: China Meteorological Administration all-time January high

== Transportation ==
- Heze Mudan Airport, in Menghai Town
