= Grand chancellor (China) =

Head of imperial Chinese government

- Chinese: 宰相
- Literal meaning: overseeing minister
Transcriptions
Standard Mandarin
- Hanyu Pinyin: zǎixiàng
- Wade–Giles: Tsai^{3}-hsiang^{4}
Yue: Cantonese
- Jyutping: zoi2 soeng1

Alternative Chinese name
- Chinese: 丞相
- Literal meaning: assistant minister
Transcriptions
Standard Mandarin
- Hanyu Pinyin: Chéngxiàng
- Wade–Giles: Ch'eng^{2}-hsiang^{4}
Yue: Cantonese
- Jyutping: sing4 soeng1

Second alternative Chinese name
- Traditional Chinese: 相國
- Simplified Chinese: 相国
- Literal meaning: administrator to the state
Transcriptions
Standard Mandarin
- Hanyu Pinyin: Xiàngguó
- Wade–Giles: Hsiang^{4}-kuo^{2}
Yue: Cantonese
- Jyutping: soeng1 gwok3

Third alternative Chinese name
- Traditional Chinese: 宰輔
- Simplified Chinese: 宰辅
- Literal meaning: overseeing assistant
Transcriptions
Standard Mandarin
- Hanyu Pinyin: Zǎifǔ
- Wade–Giles: Tsai^{3}-fu^{3}
Yue: Cantonese
- Jyutping: zoi2 fu6

Fourth alternative Chinese name
- Chinese: 宰衡
- Literal meaning: overseeing judge
Transcriptions
Standard Mandarin
- Hanyu Pinyin: Zǎihéng
- Wade–Giles: Tsai^{3}-heng^{2}
Yue: Cantonese
- Jyutping: zoi2 hang4

Fifth alternative Chinese name
- Traditional Chinese: 內閣總理大臣
- Simplified Chinese: 内阁总理大臣
- Literal meaning: great minister completely in charge of the Grand Secretariat
Transcriptions
Standard Mandarin
- Hanyu Pinyin: nèigé zǒnglǐ dàchén
Yue: Cantonese
- Jyutping: noi6 gok3 zung2 lei5 daai6 san4

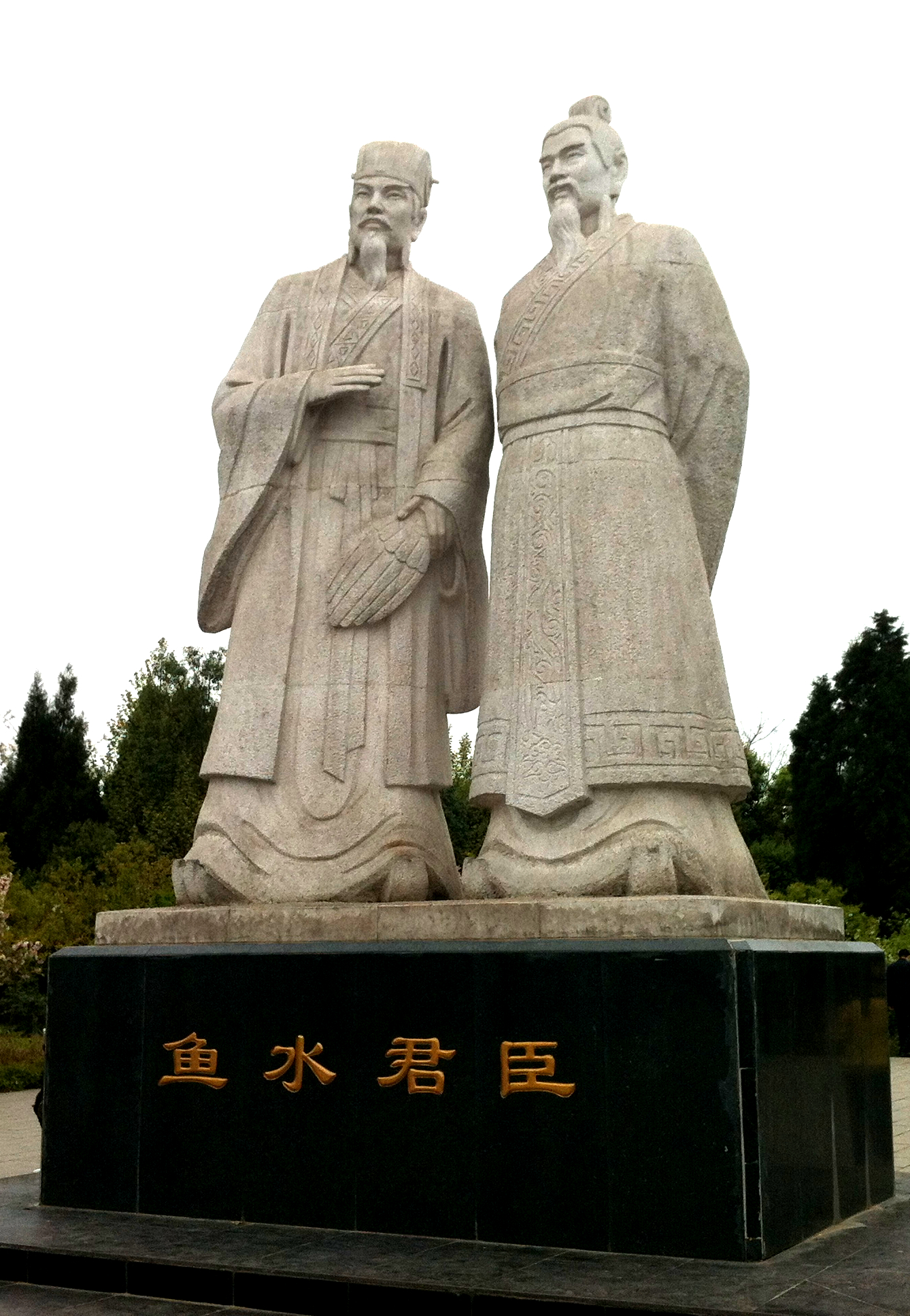
Statue of emperor Liu Bei and chancellor Zhuge Liang, considered the ideal example of the loyalty, integrity and Ruist shared governance between a lord and minister in Chinese history.

The grand chancellor, also known by its Chinese name as zaixiang (宰相, variously interpreted as counselor-in-chief, chancellor, chief councillor, chief minister, imperial chancellor, lieutenant chancellor, and prime minister) is a generic blanket title identifying the highest-ranking ministers wielding both formal and actual authorities in the imperial Chinese government. Such ministers' titles varied over time and their responsibilities and actual authorities fluctuated widely throughout Chinese history, even within a particular dynasty or within the reign of a particular emperor. During various periods, two or three ministers/titles would be recognized jointly as the grand chancellor at any given point, either exercising authorities in commission with each other or each with authorities over a broad range of functions.

The offices and titles with broad recognition and acceptance as grand chancellor invariably possessed two broad powers:

1. The formally conferred authority to make policies and decisions subject to the emperor's reversal/veto (but not to the emperor's pre-approval), and the standing right to participate in the emperor's policy making and decision making on all jurisdictional matters through direct advice (and not merely conveying decisions by the emperor to other ministers)
2. The authority to direct and supervise other ministers for implementation

The title grand chancellor have frequently been associated with powerful offices and ministers with one of the two powers but not both. This is most common with the ranking ministers from periods which the offices with both powers were formally abolished and not merely vacant. Such usage are however not broadly accepted. The role of grand chancellor was abolished in a formal sense following the elimination of the office of imperial chancellor (丞相) following the execution of Ming dynasty's Hu Weiyong in 1380. While certain individuals in the following 500 years were conferred with broad executive power comparable to or even exceed those possessed by previous grand chancellors, they were not formally referred as such.

Professor Zhu Zongbin of Peking University outlined the role of "grand chancellor" as one with the power to oversee all jurisdictional matters, the right to decide and to draft edicts with other ministers, and the position of chief advisor to the emperor. This extended even to the ability to criticize the emperor's edicts and decisions. Thus, the grand chancellor served as the emperor's chief of staff and main political advisor, often exercising power second only to the emperor. In practice, the grand chancellor was often a trusted executive aide to the emperor, but during political turmoil or power struggles between the two roles the grand chancellor could also be the emperor's primary political competitor and opponent.

This balance of power means that the relation between grand chancellor (and the scholar-officials they represent) and emperor holds great significance in the Confucian thought of governance and the relation of "lord and subject" (君臣).

"Grand chancellor" can denote several positions. During the Six Dynasties period, the term denoted a number of power-holders serving as chief administrators, including zhongshun jian (Inspector General of the Secretariat), zhongshu ling (President of the Secretariat), shizhong (Palace Attendant), shangshu ling and puye (president and vice-president of the Department of State Affairs).

== History ==
=== Early and mid-imperial China ===
In the Spring and Autumn period, Guan Zhong was the first chancellor in China, who became chancellor under the state of Qi in 685 BC. In Qin, during the Warring States period, the chancellor was officially established as "the head of all civil service officials." There were sometimes two chancellors, differentiated as being "of the left" (senior) and "of the right" (junior). After emperor Qin Shi Huang ended the Warring States period by establishing the Qin dynasty (221–206 BC), the chancellor, together with the imperial secretary, and the grand commandant, were the most important officials in the imperial government, generally referred as the Three Lords.

In 1 BC, during the reign of Emperor Ai, the title was changed to da si tu (大司徒). In the Eastern Han dynasty, the chancellor post was replaced by the Three Excellencies: Grand Commandant (太尉), Minister over the Masses (司徒) and Minister of Works (司空). In AD 190, Dong Zhuo claimed the title "Chancellor of State" (相國) under the powerless Emperor Xian of Han, placing himself above the Three Excellencies. After Dong Zhuo's death in 192, the post was vacant until Cao Cao restored the position as "imperial chancellor" (丞相) and abolished the Three Excellencies in 208. From then until March 15, 220, the power of chancellor was greater than that of the emperor. Later this often happened when a dynasty became weak, usually some decades before the fall of a dynasty.

During the Sui dynasty, the executive officials of the three highest departments of the empire were called "chancellors" (真宰相) together. In the Tang dynasty, the government was divided into three departments: the Department of State Affairs (尚書省), the Secretariat (中書省), and the Chancellery (門下省). The head of each department was generally referred to as the chancellor.

=== Late imperial China ===
In the Song dynasty, the post of chancellor was also known as the tongping zhangshi (同平章事), in accordance with late-Tang terminology, while the vice-chancellor was known as the jijunsi. Some years later, the post of chancellor was changed to "prime minister" (首相, shouxiang) and the post of vice-chancellor was changed to "second minister" (次相 cixiang). In the late Southern Song dynasty, the system changed back to the Tang naming conventions.

During the Mongol-founded Yuan dynasty, the chancellor was not the head of the Secretariat, but the Crown Prince (皇太子) was. After the establishment of the Ming dynasty, the post became the head of the Zhongshu Sheng again. The post was abolished after the execution of Hu Weiyong, who was accused of treason (though his conviction is still strongly disputed in present times because of a lack of evidence to prove his guilt). Still, appointments of the people who held the highest post in the government were called "appointment of prime minister" (拜相) until 1644. The office of the Grand Secretariat assumed the de facto powers of the chancellery after the reign of the Hongwu Emperor.

The Qing dynasty bureaucratic hierarchy did not contain a chancellor position. Instead, the duties normally assumed by a chancellor were entrusted to a series of formal and informal institutions, the most prominent of which was the Grand Council. Occasionally, one minister may have held enough power in the government such that he came to be identified, figuratively, as the "chancellor".

In 1911, the Qing court adopted reforms which, amongst other changes, established the position of prime minister. This position existed for less than a year before the Qing government was overthrown.

== Influence ==
During and after the Mongol-led Yuan dynasty, the Mongols continued the use of a title chingsang, from chengxiang (丞相) for various high leaders, such as Pulad, the Yuan ambassador to the Ilkhan and for the deputy of the Western Mongol leader, the taishi. The title was also used in the Ilkhanate, for the vizier Buqa.

== List of chancellors of China ==
=== Shang dynasty ===
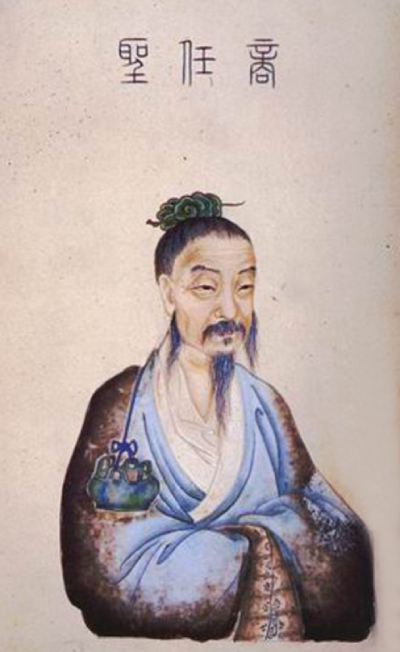
Yi Yin

- Yi Yin
- Zhong Hui
- Yi Zhi (伊陟)
- Wu Xian (巫咸)
- Wu Xian (巫賢)
- Gan Xuan (甘盤)
- Fu Yue
- Ji Zi

=== Zhou dynasty ===
- Jiang Ziya
- Duke of Zhou
- Duke Huan of Zheng
- Duke Zhuang of Zheng
- Guan Zhong of Qi state (died in 645 BC)
- Bao Shuya of Qi state
- Yan Ying of Qi state
- Fan Li of Qi State and Yue state
- Wu Zixu of Wu state
- Bo Pi of Wu state
- Cheng Dechen of Chu state
- Sunshu Ao of Chu state
- Wu Qi of Chu state
- Lord Chunshen of Chu state
- Lord Mengchang of Qi state
- Tian Dan of Qi state
- Li Kui of Wei state
- Hui Shi of Wei State
- Lin Xiangru of Zhao state
- Li Mu of Zhao state
- Su Qin of Yan state
- Yue Yi of Yan state
- Baili Xi of Qin state
- Shang Yang of Qin State
- Zhang Yi of Qin State

=== Qin dynasty ===
- Fan Ju
- Lü Buwei (251–238 BC in office)
- Lord Changping
- Kui Zhuang
- Wang Guan
- Li Si (?–208 BC in office)
- Feng Quji
- Zhao Gao (208–207 BC in office)

=== Han dynasty ===
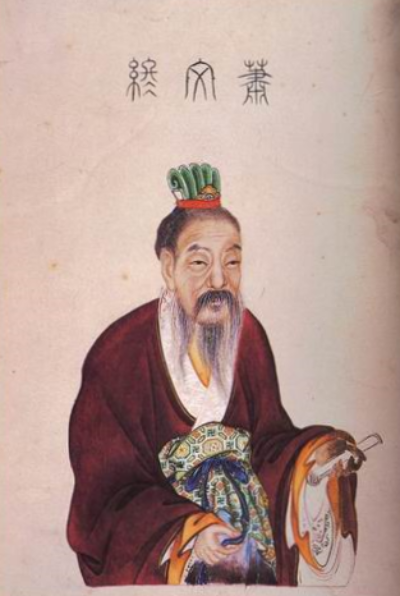
Xiao He

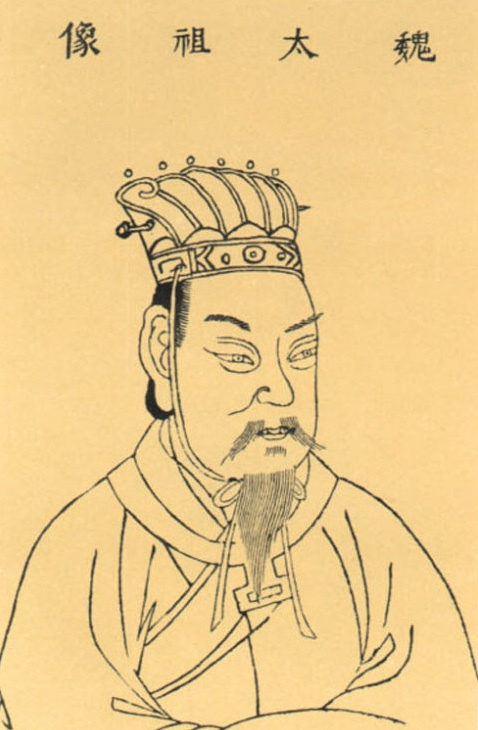
Cao Cao, one of the most famous Chinese chancellors who controlled the Late Han dynasty

- Xiao He (206–193 BC in office); Chen Xi (197 BC), over Zhao
- Cao Shen (193–190 BC in office)
- Chen Ping (190–179 BC in office)
- Zhou Bo
- Guan Ying
- Zhou Yafu (?–147 BC in office)
- Tian Fen (田蚡, 135 BC—?, died c. 130 BC), in office during the 132 BC Yellow River flood
- Huo Guang
- Shi Dan 史丹 (see Emperor Yuan of Han)
- Yin Zhong (尹忠, 29 BC in office), committed suicide for a disastrous Yellow River flood
- Wang Mang
- Liu Yan (Bosheng)
- Deng Yu (AD 25–27 in office)
- Wu Han
- Yuan An
- Dou Xian
- Li Gu
- Liang Ji
- Dou Wu
- Chen Fan
- Qiao Xuan
- Cao Song
- Zhang Wen
- Liu Yu
- Dong Zhuo
- He Jin
- Wang Yun
- Ma Midi
- Xun Shuang
- Huangfu Song
- Zhu Jun
- Cao Cao (196-220 in office)
- Cao Pi

=== Three Kingdoms ===
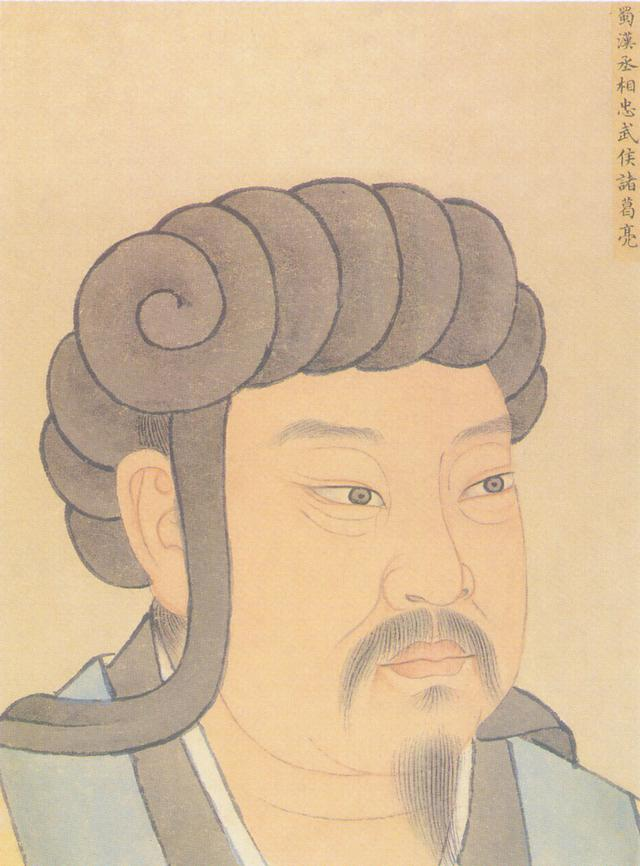
Zhuge Liang (181–234), chancellor of the Shu Han (221–234)

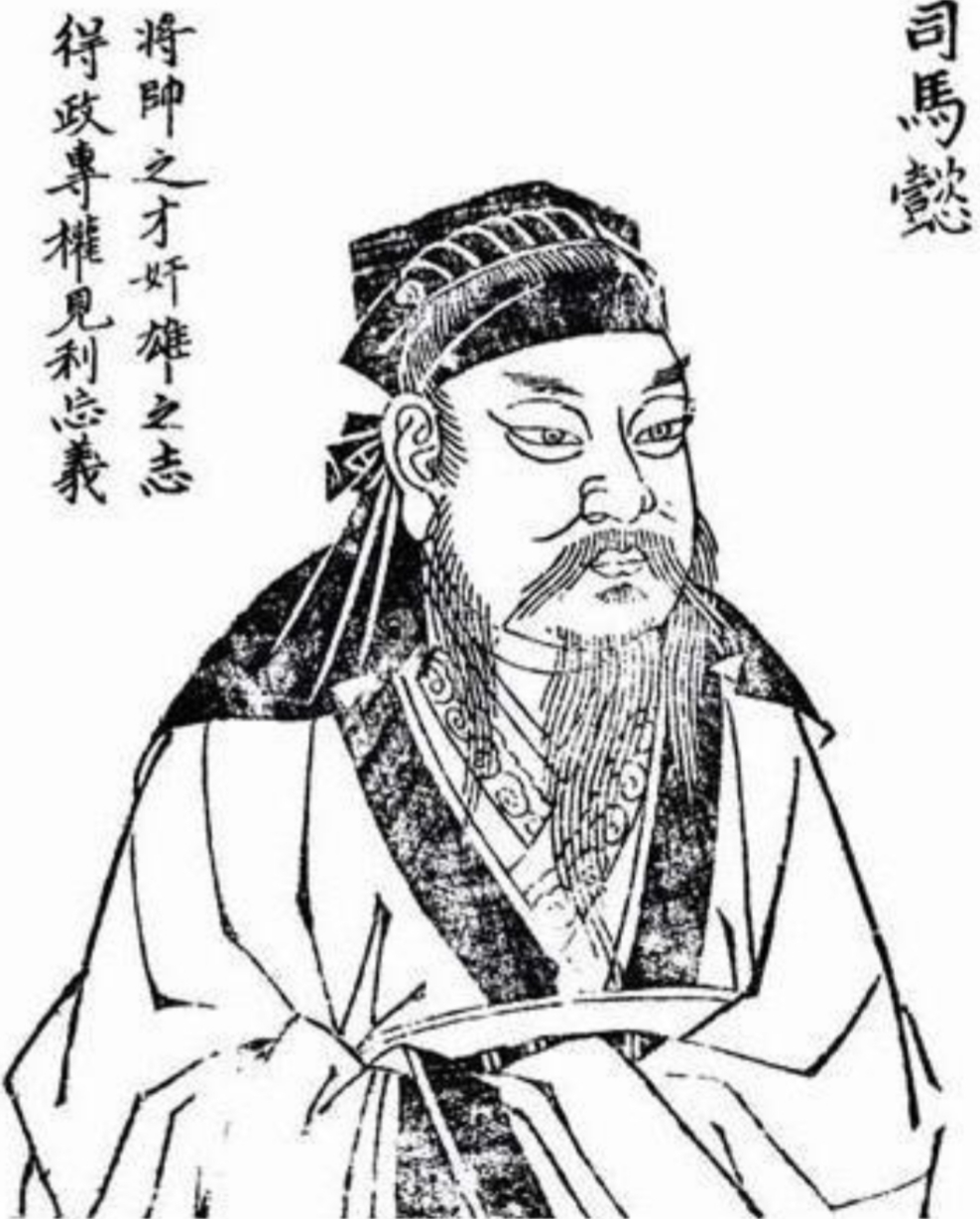
Sima Yi (179–251), chancellor of the Cao Wei (221–251)

==== Eastern Wu ====
- Sun Shao (221–225)
- Gu Yong (225–243)
- Lu Xun (244–245)
- Bu Zhi (246–247)
- Zhu Ju (249–250)
- Sun Jun (253–256)
- Sun Chen (258)
- Puyang Xing (262–264)
- Lu Kai (~266-270) and Wan Yu (~266-272)
- Zhang Ti (279–280)

==== Shu Han ====
- Zhuge Liang (221–234)
- Jiang Wan
- Fei Yi
- Dong Yun
- Jiang Wei
- Dong Jue
- Fan Jian
- Zhuge Zhan

==== Cao Wei ====
- Jia Xu
- Hua Xin
- Zhong Yao
- Wang Lang
- Chen Qun
- Dong Zhao
- Cui Lin
- Man Chong
- Jiang Ji
- Cao Shuang
- Sima Yi
- Gao Rou
- Wang Ling
- Zhuge Dan
- Sun Li
- Sima Shi
- Sima Zhao
- Sima Fu
- Wang Chang
- Wang Guan
- Deng Ai
- Zhong Hui
- Sima Yan
- Wang Xiang
- Sima Wang

=== Sui dynasty ===
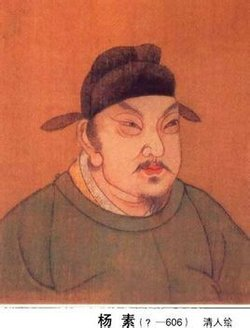
- Yang Su
  Gao Jiong
- Li Shimin
- Li Delin
- Su Wei
- Yang Su
- Yang Guang
- Yang Xiu
- Yang Zhao
- Yang Jian
- Xiao Cong
- Yuwen Shu
- Yu Shiji
- Li Yuan
- Yuwen Huaji
- Wang Shichong
- Li Mi

=== Tang dynasty ===
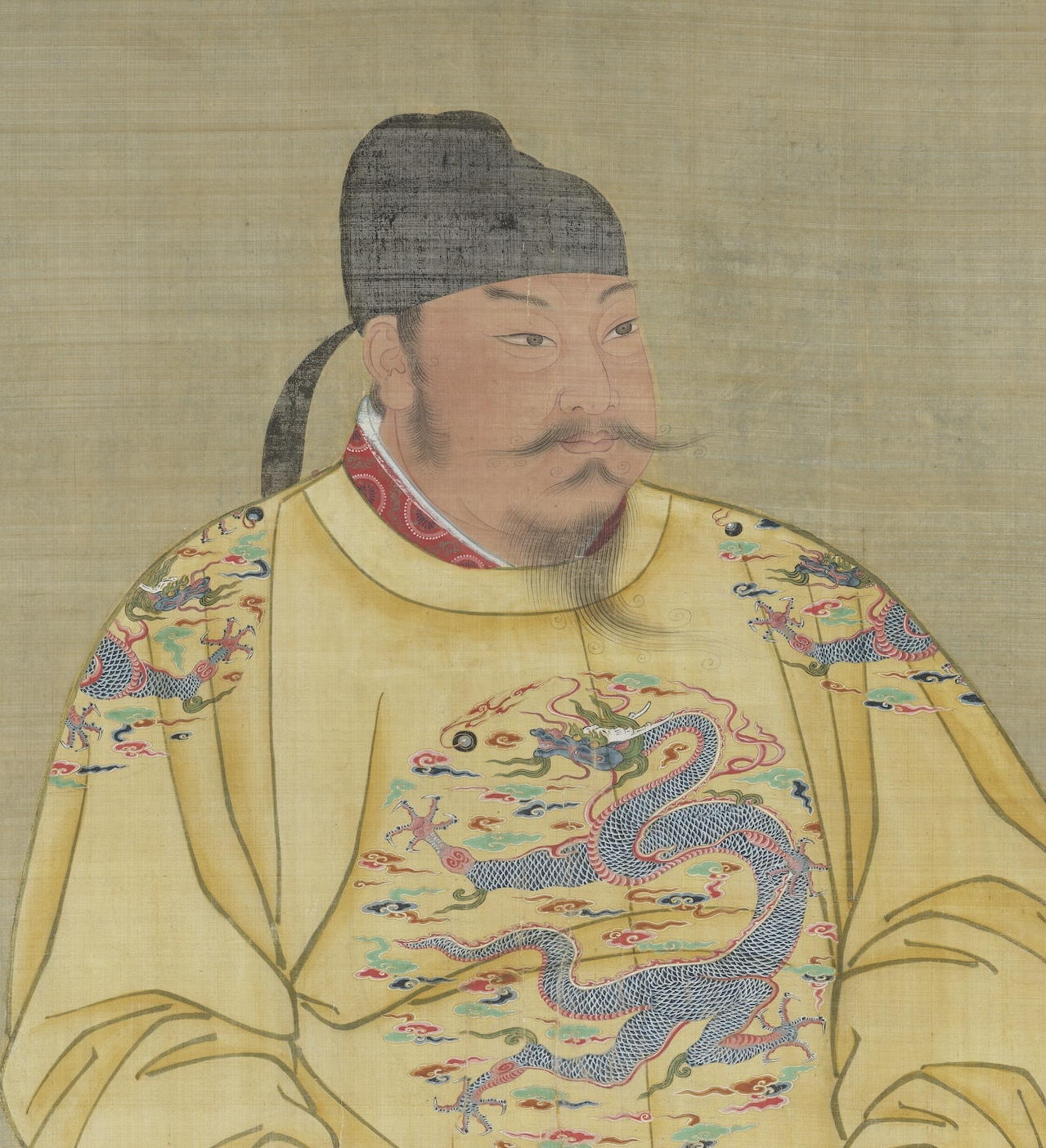
Li Shimin, later enthroned and posthumously known as Emperor Taizong, was the head for the Department of State Affairs

=== Song dynasty ===
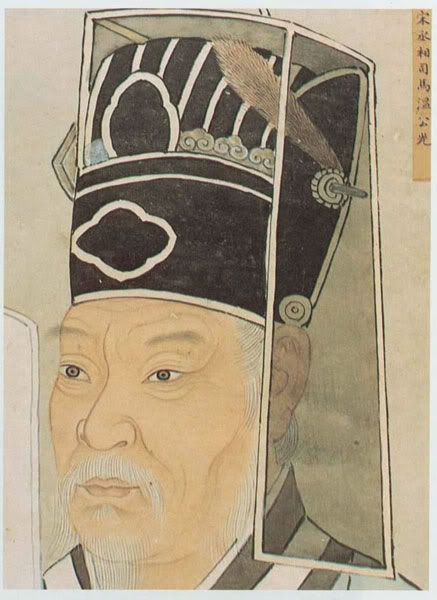
Sima Guang, chancellor of the Song dynasty (1085–1086)

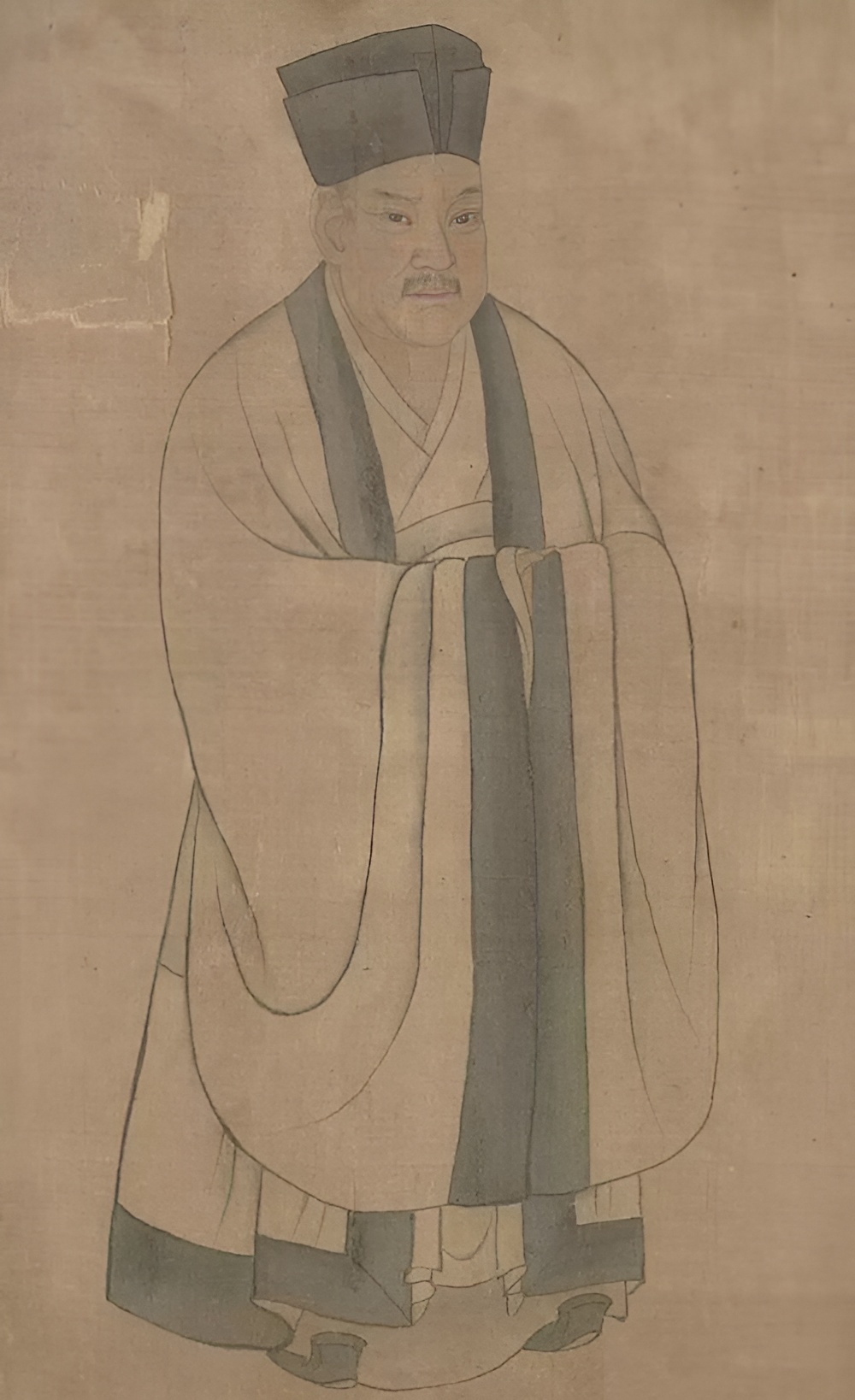
Qin Hui, chancellor of the Song dynasty (1131–1132, 1137–1155)

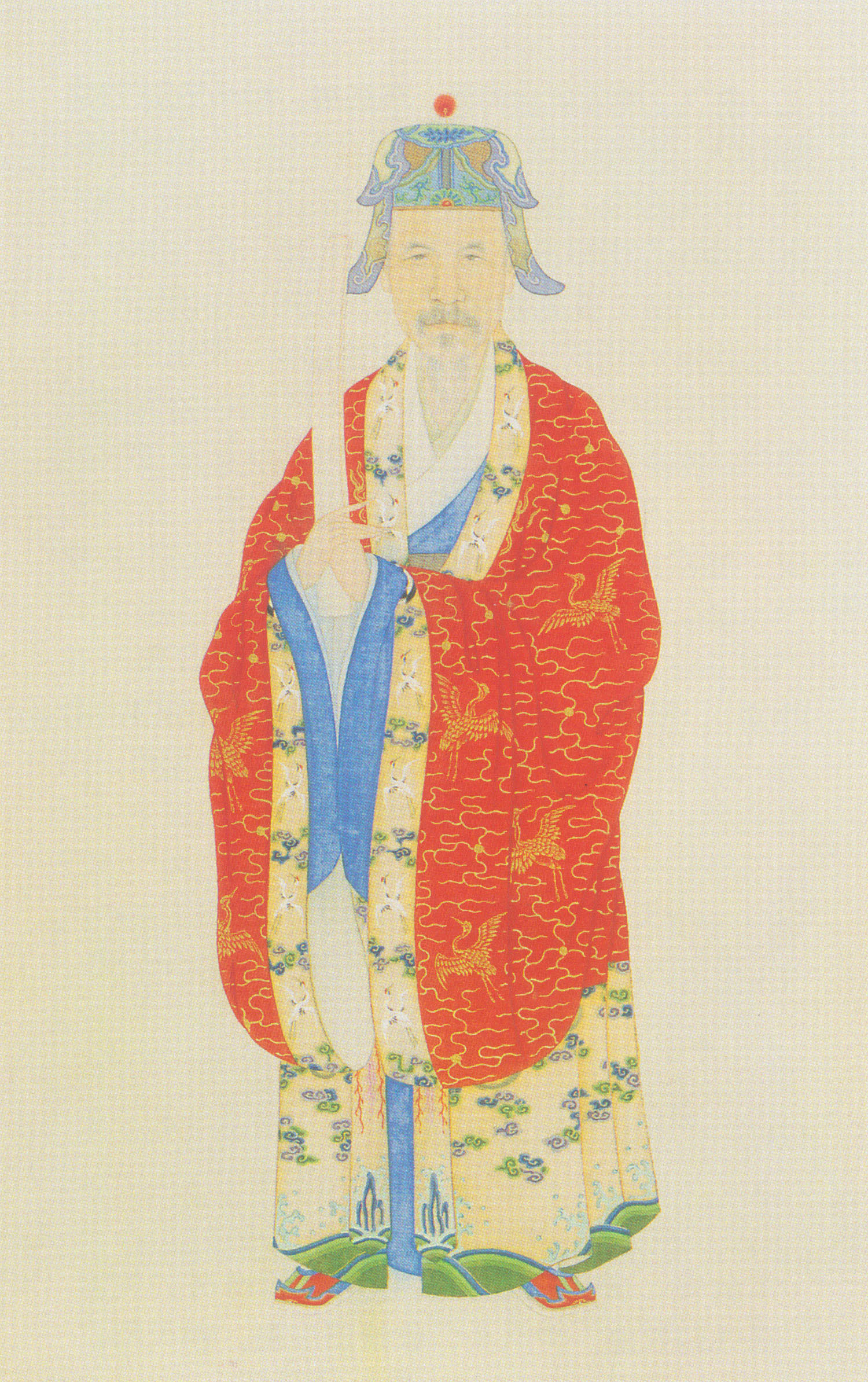
Wen Tianxiang chancellor of the Song dynasty (1275–1278)

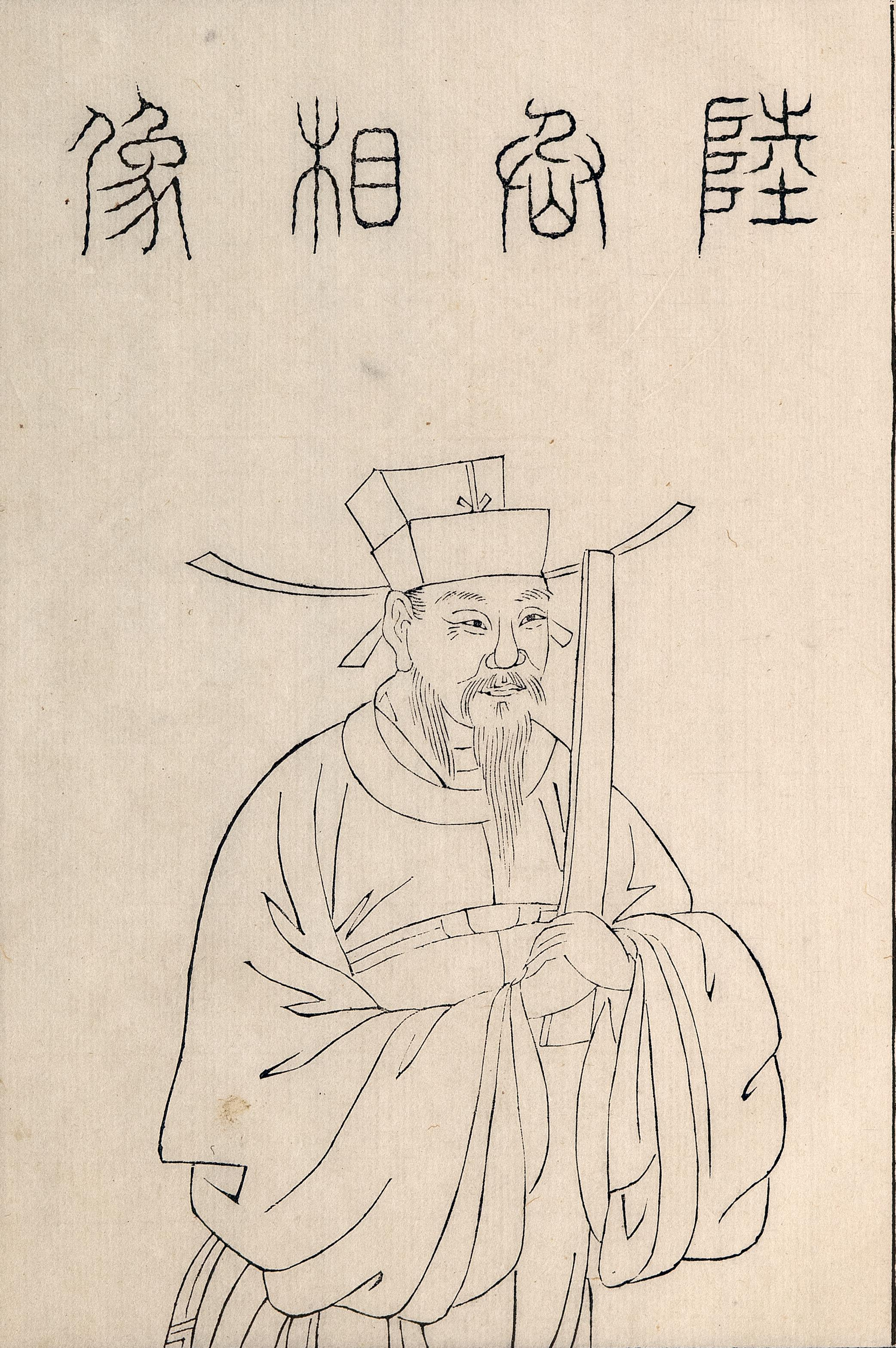
Lu Xiufu chancellor of the Song dynasty (1278–1279)

==== Northern Song ====
- Fan Zhi (960–964 in office)
- Zhao Pu (964–973, 981–983, 988–992 in office)
- Shen Lun (973–982 in office)
- Xue Juzheng (973–981 in office)
- Lu Douxun (976–982 in office)
- Lü Mengzheng (988–991, 993–995, 1001–1001 in office)
- Kou Zhun (1004–1006, 1017–1021 in office)
- Wang Qinruo (1017–1019, 1023–1024 in office)
- Wang Zeng (1022–1029, 1035–1037 in office)
- Fan Zhongyan (1040–1045 in office)
- Wang Anshi (1067-1075, 1076–1077 in office)
- Sima Guang (1085–1086 in office)
- Fan Chunren (1086– in office)
- Fan Chunli (– in office)
- Zhang Dun (1094–1100 in office)
- Cai Jing (1101–1125 in office)

==== Southern Song ====
- Li Gang (1127 in office)
- Zhang Jun (1135–1137 in office)
- Qin Hui (1131–1132, 1137–1155 in office)
- Han Tuozhou (1194–1207 in office)
- Shi Miyuan/Shih Mi-yüan (1207–1233 in office).
- Jia Sidao (1259–1275 in office)
- Chen Yizhong (1275–1276 in office)
- Wen Tianxiang (1275–1278 in office)
- Lu Xiufu (1278–1279 in office)

=== Ming and Qing ===
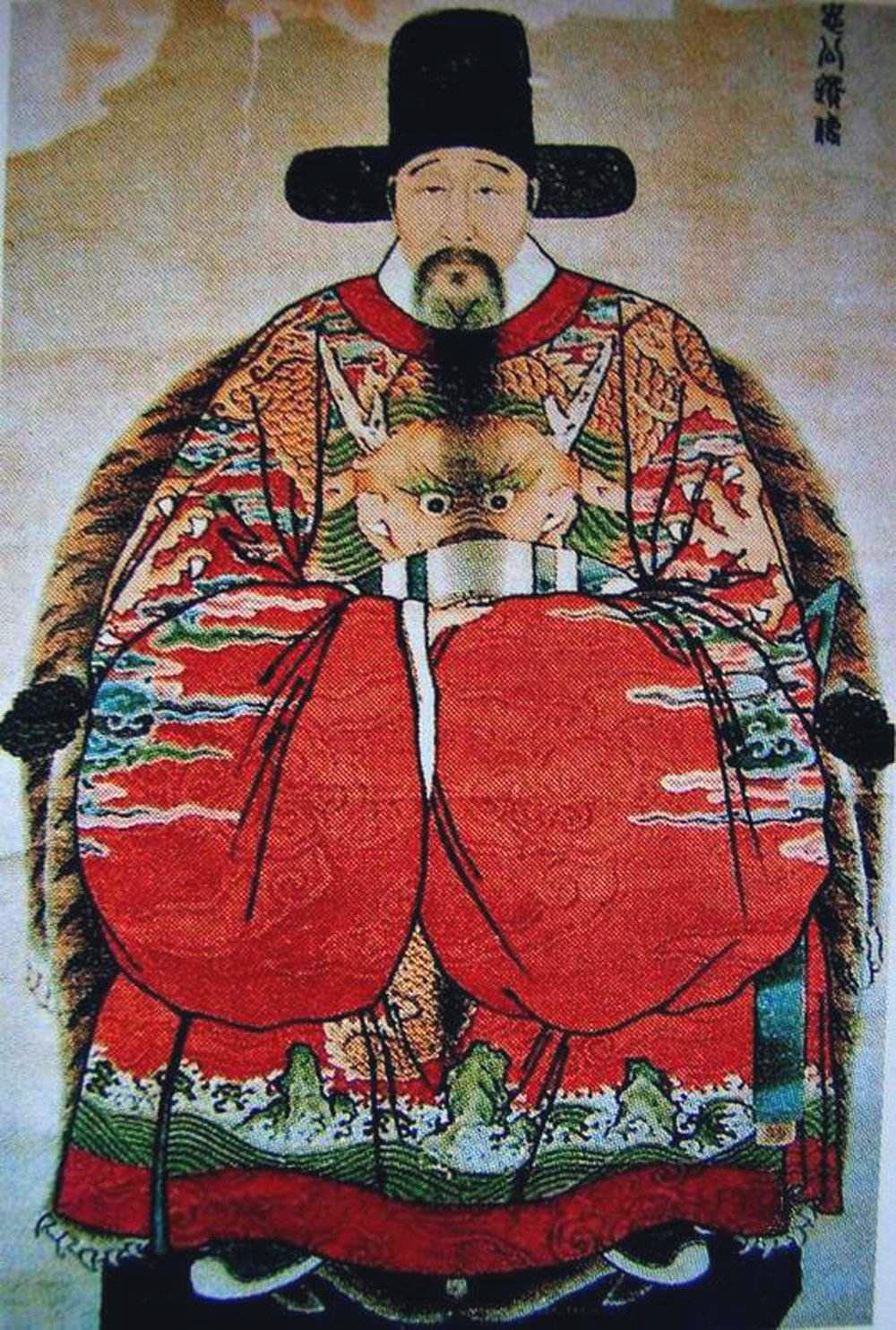
Zhang Juzheng was the de facto ruler of Ming dynasty when he served as the Senior Grand Secretary (1572–1582)

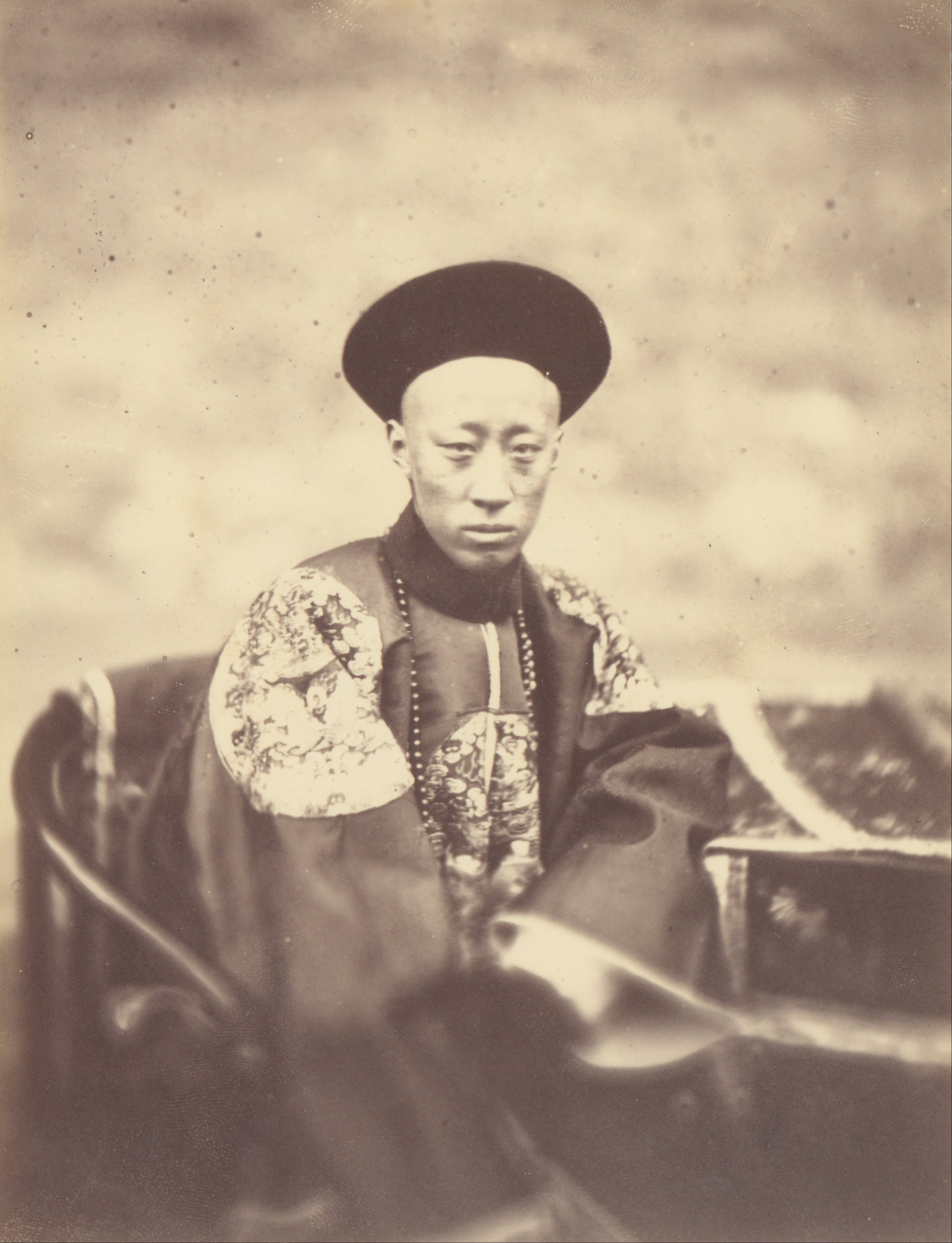
Prince Gong is the longest-serving Chief Grand Councillor of the Qing dynasty

== See also ==
- Chancellor of the Tang dynasty
- Prime Minister of the Imperial Cabinet
- Menxia Sheng
- List of premiers of China
- Imperial examination
- Chinese law
- Shumishi
- Shogun Japanese Equivalent
