= Wang Qinruo =

Wang Qinruo (王欽若)

Grand Councilor of the Song dynasty
- In office August 28, 1017 – July 13, 1019
- Monarch: Emperor Zhenzong
- In office September 22, 1023 – April 27, 1024
- Monarch: Emperor Renzong

Personal details
- Born: 962 or January 963 Xinyu, Southern Tang
- Died: December 22, 1025 (aged 62–63) Kaifeng, Northern Song
- Spouse: Lady Li (李)
- Children: Wang Congyi (王從益), son; Wang Qingzhi (王慶之), son; 2 daughters
- Parent: Wang Zhonghua (王仲華) (father)
- Posthumous name: Wenmu (文穆)

Wang Qinruo
- Traditional Chinese: 王欽若
- Simplified Chinese: 王钦若
Transcriptions
Standard Mandarin
- Hanyu Pinyin: Wáng Qīnruò
- Wade–Giles: Wang^{2} Ch'in^{1}-jo^{4}

Wang Dingguo
- Traditional Chinese: 王定國
- Simplified Chinese: 王定国
Transcriptions
Standard Mandarin
- Hanyu Pinyin: Wáng Dìngguó

Wang Qinruo (c. 962 – 22 December 1025), courtesy name Dingguo, was an official of China's Northern Song dynasty. He was the chancellor from 1017 to 1019 during Emperor Zhenzong's reign and from 1023 to 1025 during Emperor Renzong's reign.

Wang Qinruo was the primary advisor behind Emperor Zhenzong's decision to carry out the rare and lavish Feng and Shan sacrifices in 1008. He was involved in orchestrating the receipt of auspicious signs to justify this ritual, including the appearance of heavenly texts demanding its completion. After 1008, he facilitated further Taoist and Confucian rites, serving to demonstrate Zhenzong's possession of the Mandate of Heaven. Opponents of Wang Qinruo criticized these decisions for unduly burdening the Emperor's subjects with unproductive state expenses, and he has been negatively portrayed by later historians as attempting to manipulate Heaven.

Wang Qinruo led the compilation of Prime Tortoise of the Record Bureau, an important encyclopedia.

Wang Qinruo had a few very unpopular proposals, including moving the capital to southern China. Moreover, he appeared to have a personal vendetta against the upright official Kou Zhun and tried hard to have the latter demoted. History of Song recorded that Emperor Renzong believed Wang Qinruo treacherous, and that during his time Wang Qinruo was nicknamed by the population as one of the "Five Devils", along with Ding Wei, Lin Te (林特), Chen Pengnian (陳彭年) and Liu Chenggui (劉承珪).

== In fiction ==
In the popular legends of Generals of the Yang Family, the antagonist Wang Qin (王欽) is based on Wang Qinruo. In some versions Wang Qin is even a spy from the Liao dynasty.
