= Huangdian, Shandong =

Huangdian 黄店镇
- Town
- Location in Shandong Huangdian (China)
- Coordinates: 35°04′44″N 115°42′31″E
- Country: People's Republic of China
- Province: Shandong
- Prefecture-level city: Heze
- County: Dingtao
- Elevation: 49 m (161 ft)
- Time zone: UTC+8 (China Standard)
- Area code: 0635

Huangdian (simplified Chinese: 黄店; traditional Chinese: 黃店; pinyin: Huángdiàn) is a town in Dingtao County in southwestern Shandong province, China, located 11 kilometres (6.8 mi) due east of the county seat. As of 2011, it has 50 villages under its administration.

== See also ==
- List of township-level divisions of Shandong
