= 39 BC =

39 BC in various calendars
- Gregorian calendar: 39 BC; XXXIX BC
- Ab urbe condita: 715
- Ancient Egypt era: XXXIII dynasty, 285
- Pharaoh: Cleopatra VII, 13
- Ancient Greek Olympiad (summer): 185th Olympiad, year 2
- Assyrian calendar: 4712
- Balinese saka calendar: N/A
- Bengali calendar: −632 – −631
- Berber calendar: 912
- Buddhist calendar: 506
- Burmese calendar: −676
- Byzantine calendar: 5470–5471
- Chinese calendar: 辛巳年 (Metal Snake); 2659 or 2452 — to — 壬午年 (Water Horse); 2660 or 2453
- Coptic calendar: −322 – −321
- Discordian calendar: 1128
- Ethiopian calendar: −46 – −45
- Hebrew calendar: 3722–3723
- Hindu calendars
- Vikram Samvat: 18–19
- Shaka Samvat: N/A
- Kali Yuga: 3062–3063
- Holocene calendar: 9962
- Iranian calendar: 660 BP – 659 BP
- Islamic calendar: 680 BH – 679 BH
- Javanese calendar: N/A
- Julian calendar: 39 BC; XXXIX BC
- Korean calendar: 2295
- Minguo calendar: 1950 before ROC 民前1950年
- Nanakshahi calendar: −1506
- Seleucid era: 273/274 AG
- Thai solar calendar: 504–505
- Tibetan calendar: ལྕགས་མོ་སྦྲུལ་ལོ་ (female Iron-Snake); 88 or −293 or −1065 — to — ཆུ་ཕོ་རྟ་ལོ་ (male Water-Horse); 89 or −292 or −1064

Year 39 BC was either a common year starting on Friday, Saturday or Sunday or a leap year starting on Saturday of the Julian calendar (the sources differ, see leap year error for further information) and a common year starting on Saturday of the Proleptic Julian calendar. At the time, it was known as the Year of the Consulship of Censorinus and Sabinus (or, less frequently, year 715 Ab urbe condita). The denomination 39 BC for this year has been used since the early medieval period, when the Anno Domini calendar era became the prevalent method in Europe for naming years.

== Events ==
=== By place ===
==== Roman Republic ====
- Marcus Antonius dispatches Publius Ventidius Bassus with 11 legions to the East and drives Quintus Labienus out of Asia Minor. Labienus retreats into Syria, where he receives Parthian reinforcements. Ventidius finally defeats him in the battle at the Taurus Mountains.
- Publius Ventidius defeats Pharnastanes with his cataphracts at the Amanus Gates, and goes on to reclaim Syria, Phoenicia and Judea. Labienus flees to Cilicia, where he is captured and executed.
- Sextus Pompey, styles himself "son of Neptune", controls Sicily, Sardinia, Corsica and the Peloponnesus, and is recognized by the Triumvirate in the Pact of Misenum. The pact helps to assure Rome's grain supply, and the blockade on Roman Italy is lifted.

==== Western Han Empire ====
- 39 BC Yellow River flood

== Births ==
- Antonia the Elder, daughter of Mark Antony, grandmother of Nero and Messalina (d. bef. AD 25)
- Julia the Elder, daughter of Caesar Augustus (d. AD 14)

== Deaths ==
- Quintus Labienus, Roman general (murdered)
