= Stone dogs in the Leizhou Peninsula =

Canine sculptures from the Leizhou Peninsula

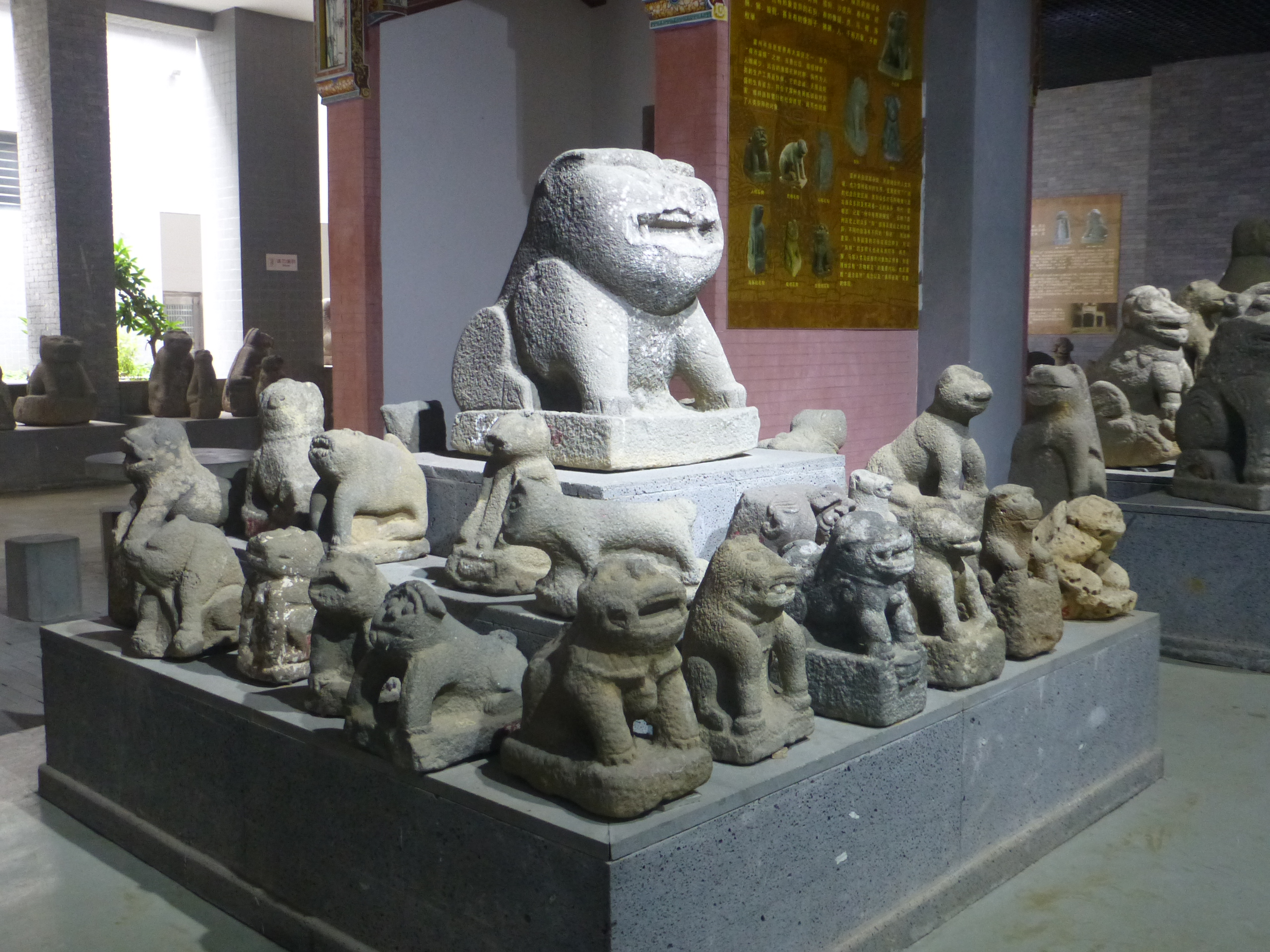
Stone dogs in Leizhou Museum.

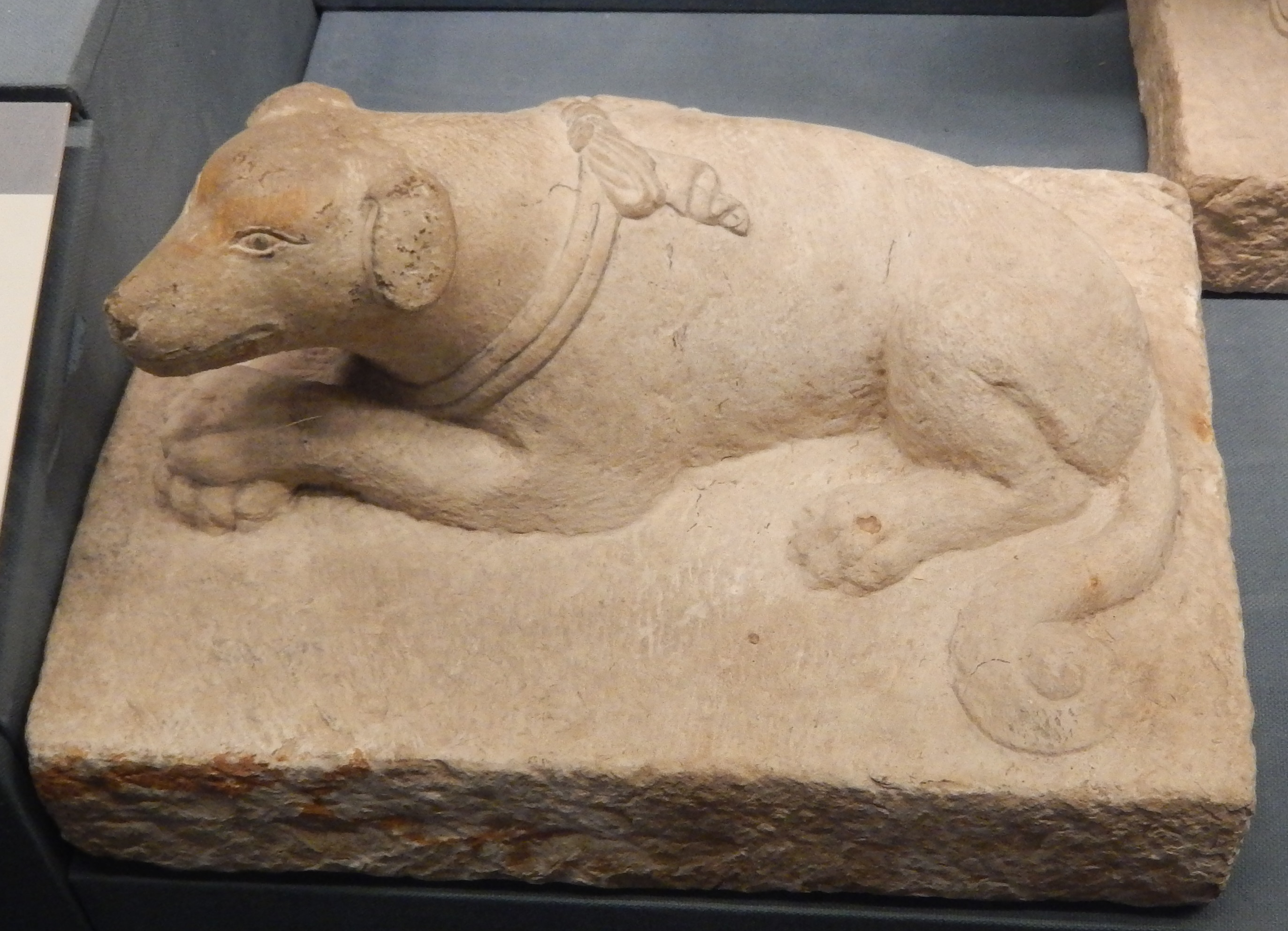
white stone dog

The Leizhou stone dogs are historical canine sculptures from the Leizhou Peninsula. They blend the locally-held tradition of totem worship with different ethnic cultures. In the past, the Leizhou Peninsula was an inhospitable land with relatively few inhabitants. Due the difficulty of bearing and raising children while living in such harsh conditions, the original inhabitants worshipped dogs, which could easily give birth to their offspring. Numerous stone dogs are widely distributed at village entrances, roads, and gates. The Stone Dogs are an important part of the local cultural history, and have many meanings and shapes. They are roughly carved, and have turned grayish from long term exposure to the elements.

The Stone Dogs attract many tourists from both within China and abroad. The stone dog is a form of art and culture largely exclusive to the Leizhou Peninsula, rarely seen elsewhere within China or the world.

== Distribution ==
There is no distinct rule in the distribution of stone dogs. Most of them are scattered in the coastal areas of the Leizhou Peninsula, especially in Zhanjiang City, Xuwen, Haikang, Lanjiang County, Suixi and many other small rural villages' entrances, corners, gates, ponds and the entrances of the houses and temples. They are famous in Chentown, Angle Tail Town, Longmen Town, QinDou Town, Lianjiang City, Hengshan Town, GoodDong Town, and Shuixi Jiang Hong Town because stone dogs of these cities are more completely preserved. The stone dogs in different regions come in different shapes, representing the evolution of the region. The discovery sites are historical, and may date back to the Qin dynasty. According to the unofficial statistics Leizhou Peninsula has over a million stone dogs. The Leizhou Museum has collected nearly 500 stone dogs from the countryside, village corners, buried underground, or the villagers.

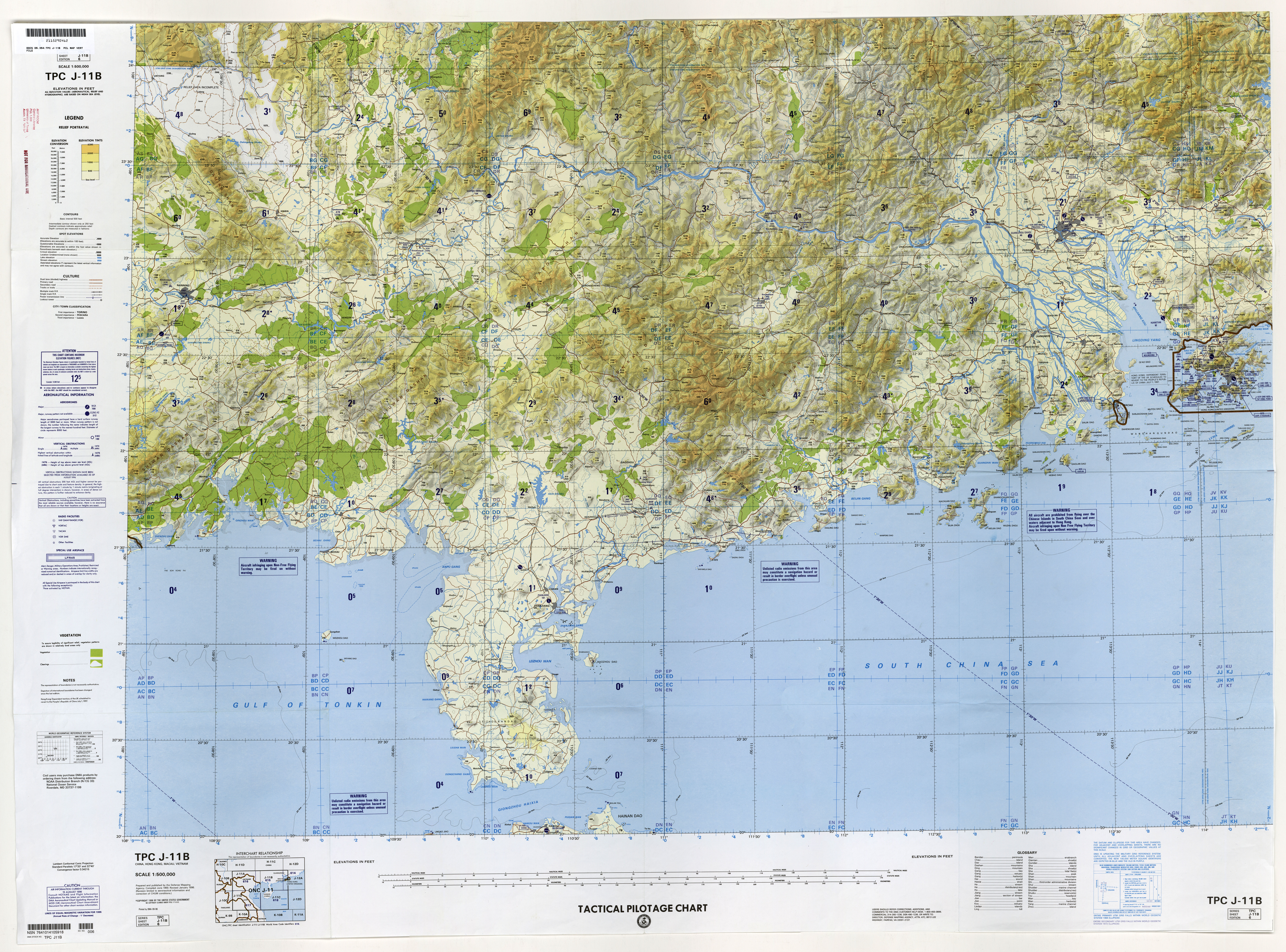
Leizhou

== History ==
=== Origin ===
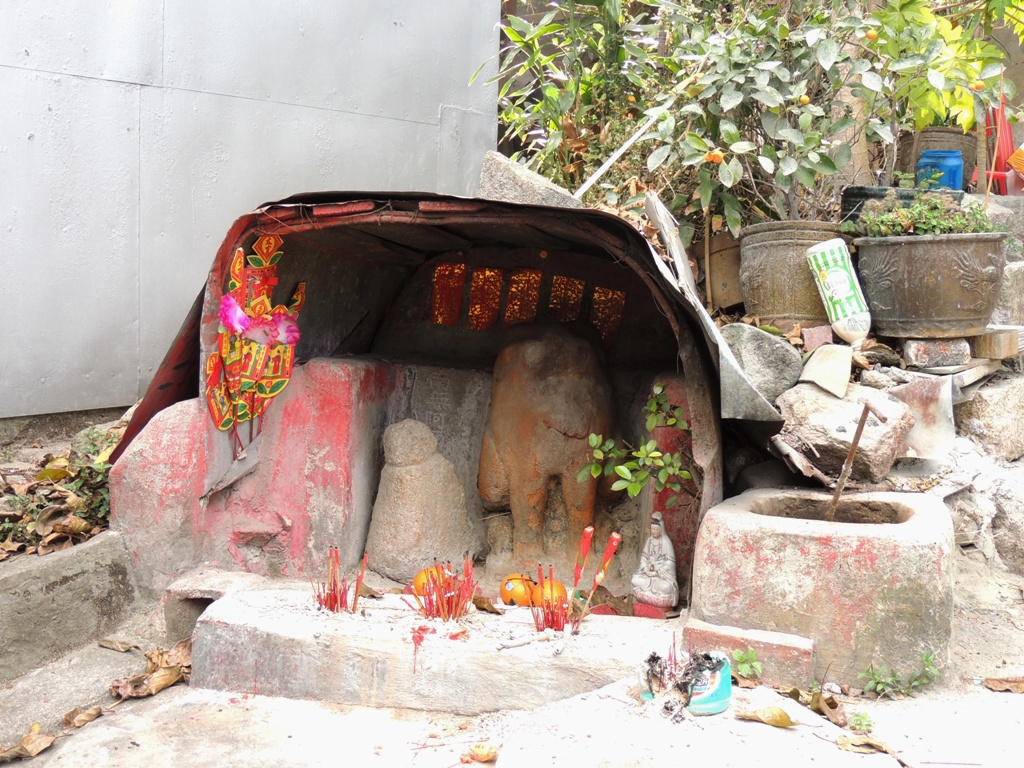
Worship of Stone Dogs in Tai O, Hong Kong.

Stone dogs are a product of the historic culture and natural environment in Leizhou Peninsula. The folk religions play the most important role, especially totemism and the worship of the Immortal Thunder. The cultures of the Zhou and Han dynasty, Taoism culture, Buddhist culture and geomancy also contribute to the rich historic meanings of stone dogs. Leizhou Peninsula is one of the most famous minefields in the world. The worship of the Immortal Thunder became a regional origin of the superstition of Stone Dogs in Leizhou. Li, Lao, Yao, Tong, Miao, and Lin peoples have all historically inhabited the Leizhou Peninsula. Those peoples had their own totems, such as Lin worships the raccoon dog and Miao regarded cats as their totem. Over time the local peoples gradually mixed together and were influenced one another. Their previous mascots and totems had been changed or integrated with each other. Eventually they reached a consensus on regarding the dog as their mascot in Leizhou Peninsula. From then on the worship of dogs become the origin of Stone Dogs culture.

=== Connotation ===
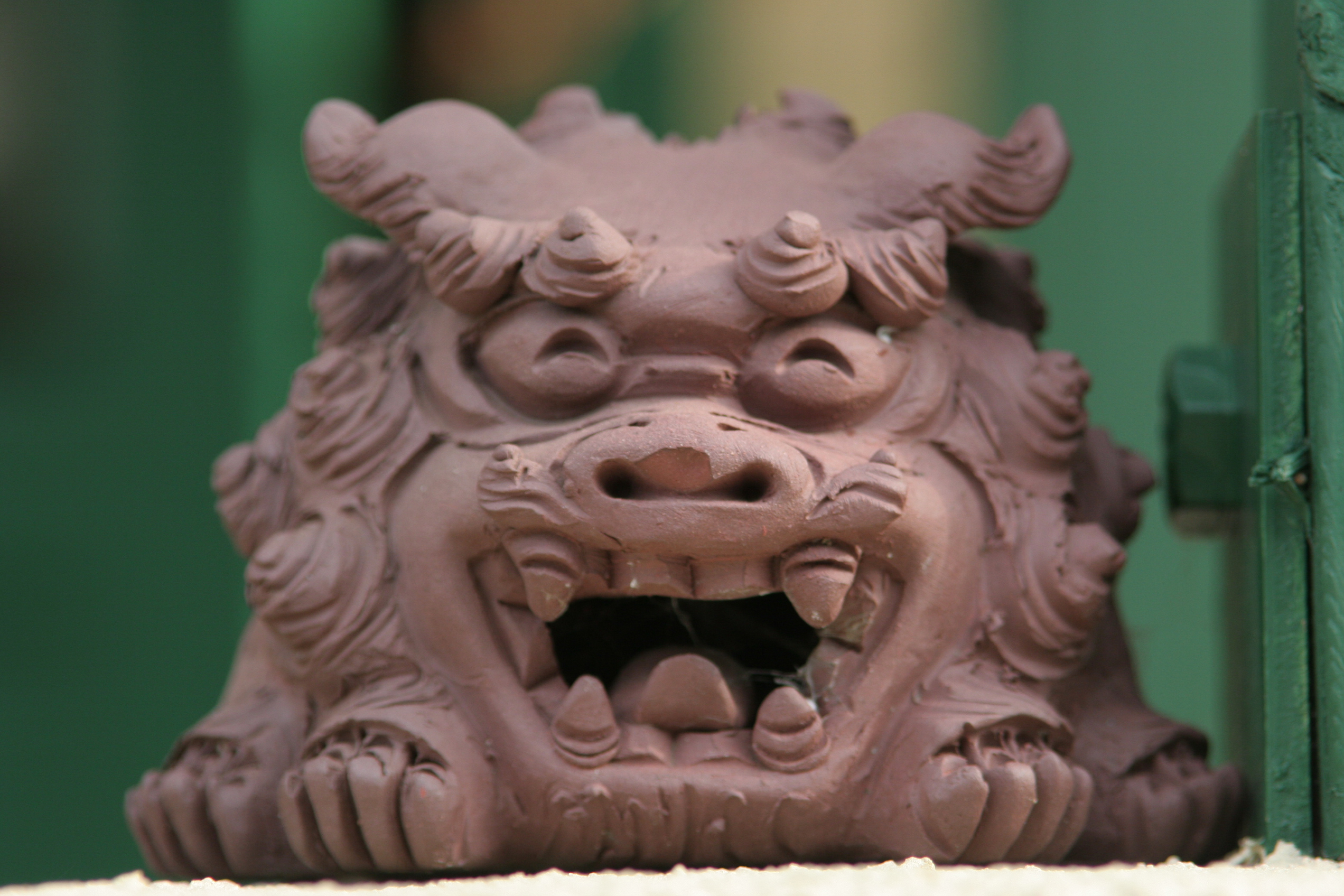
stone dogs

Originally, aborigines in Leizhou Peninsula thought dogs had abundant fertility, especially the ability to give birth to male dogs. In ancient times Chinese people focused on the fertility not of the land, but of the people farming it. Many of Stone dogs in the Leizhou Peninsula have gigantic penises as a symbol of blessings for the villagers' fertility. Stone dogs were also considered auspicious animals. It was believed that they could bring rain to the farms. The people believed rainwater was charity from God, so the rain-praying ceremony would be held at a fixed time, especially during a drought. It originates from a legend that a thousand years ago, a severe drought hit Leizhou Peninsula and a wizard told people all the sufferings resulted from the mischief of the Immortal Sun. Only the heavenly dog could make the powerful bark to scare off the Immortal Sun. In Chinese myths, there is a story about a heavenly dog eating the sun and bringing rain to the people. Stone dogs were also regarded as an angel, who is able to suppress evil and gave a blessing of peace. There is a fear of thunder and storms because excessive rain will rot the rice crops. In Chinese, Lei means thunder, and Zhou means peninsula. Leizhou Peninsula is beside the Qiongzhou Strait, which sees high levels of lightning activity. Historically, Leizhou was a wild land that was full of brownish miasma. The local residents had to dwell in the harsh conditions. Consequently, wherever people thought there was a demon, they placed stone dogs to help protect them; thus at the gate or before temples and tombs, at every entrance to village lay stone dogs with surly, brutal-looking and wild-eyed expressions. Today, the Stone Dogs in the Leizhou Peninsula are an important part of the local history, and help promote the peninsula to tourists.

== Characteristics ==
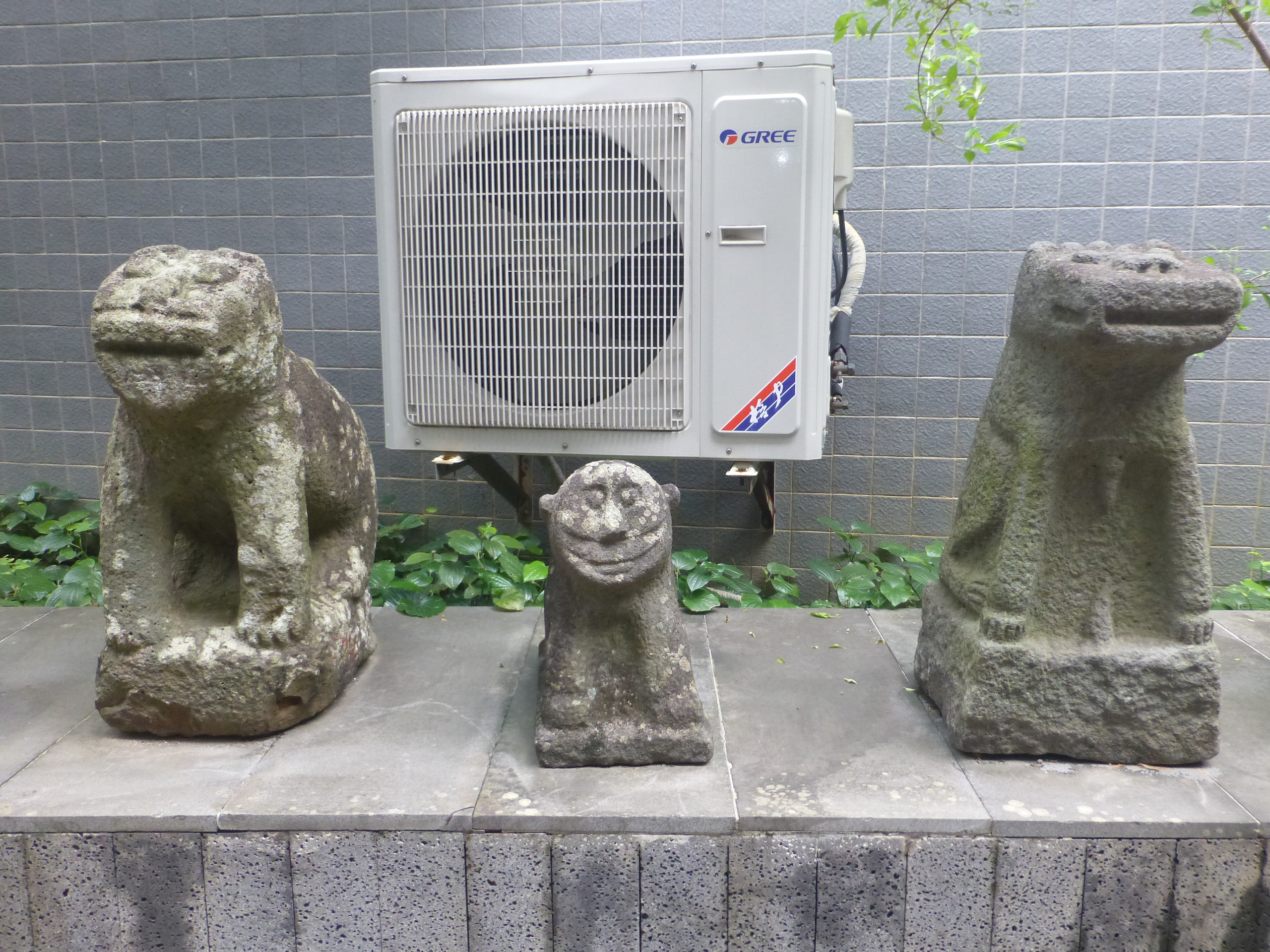
Stone dogs in Leizhou Museum

=== Features ===
Leizhou stone dogs are carved from basalt. The biggest stone dog is about 130 centimetres (51 in) high, and the smallest one is only about 10 centimetres (3.9 in) high. The features of the dogs vary depending on the time and place they were carved. The carving methods are unknown, but the style is plain with good workmanship. Based on the type, stone dogs can be roughly classified into groups:

1. From the Spring and Autumn period to Hingham dynasties, most stone dogs were simple, rough, uninhibited and featured as images that their heads are up to the sky like the wolves.
2. Then later on, the main features evolved into boldness and strength, the coordination of stereo and strength in this period, especially the engraving of the penis as a prayer for fertility. And by means of the anthropomorphic form and the skillfully perfect shape, the stone dogs stand for the blessing for social stability and outstanding talent poets' folkway of primitive simplicity.

There are various decorations that were carved on the stone dogs:

- Yun-lei (cloud & thunder): the ancient Leizhou Peninsula ancestors worship and deify thunder. The stone dogs with different Yun-lei patterns are the cultural inheritance. Yun-lei stone dogs have a wide range in Leizhou Peninsula, appearing in almost every town.
- Lotus: The lotus is holy to Buddhists, so the Leizhou Peninsula stone dogs carved lotus petals lines reflect the Leizhou ancestors' belief in stone dog as unusual things in the world. It is lofty, sanctity, no desire for fame and fortune, a representation of a selfless dedication and precious spirit. People want to express the homage to their dogs.
- Phoenix: Phoenix bird is symbol of the Goddess, and is the mascot of the Chinese nation. People worship the pregnant women or animals, which evidently show their desire to have many descendants.
- Some stone dog pedal on a drum to show the significance of the supernatural power of stone dog.
- Some stone dogs hold grains in the mouth as the symbol of harvest.
- Some stone dogs have copper necklaces representing lots of fortune.

=== Types ===
Polymorphic Stone Dog: Leizhou Peninsula in the past was a multi-ethnic gathering of regional culture. The various tribal totems were carved on the stone dogs. Without advanced tools, there were few features of facial expressions, only concise lines on the rough bodies. These kind of stone dogs are preserved now in the museums.

Anthropomorphized Stone Dog: The people sanctify the stone dog to be a god and more humanized. This kind of stone dog has a stone face with exaggerated human facial features, especially the nose, mouth, eyes, eyebrow bone and so on.

Lionlike Stone Dog: These stone dogs have many of the features of lions. This type has a round head, sunken eyes, and rich facial expression like a lion's. In ancient times, Leizhou City was China's most southern political, military, economic, cultural place of Maritime Silk Road. Beginning in the Han dynasty the foreign trade was very prosperous. Foreign culture, along with business, spread around Leizhou, especially Buddhist culture. According to Buddhism, the lion is the king of all animals. Stone dogs in Leizhou Peninsula have the characteristics of the lions, which was influenced by Buddhist culture to make the stone dog the king of all animals in Leizhou.
