= Zhangwan, Shandong =

Zhangwan
- Town

Chinese transcription(s)
  - Chinese: 张湾镇
  - Pinyin: Zhāngwān Zhèn
- Interactive map of Zhangwan
- Coordinates: 35.065°N 115.413°E
- Country: China
- Province: Shandong
- Prefecture: Heze
- County: Dingtao
- Time zone: UTC+8 (China Standard Time)

Zhangwan is a township-level division situated in Dingtao County, Heze, Shandong, China.

== See also ==
- List of township-level divisions of Shandong
