= Lei Prefecture =

Historical administrative division in Guangdong, China

Lei Prefecture (雷州) Haikang Commandery (海康郡)
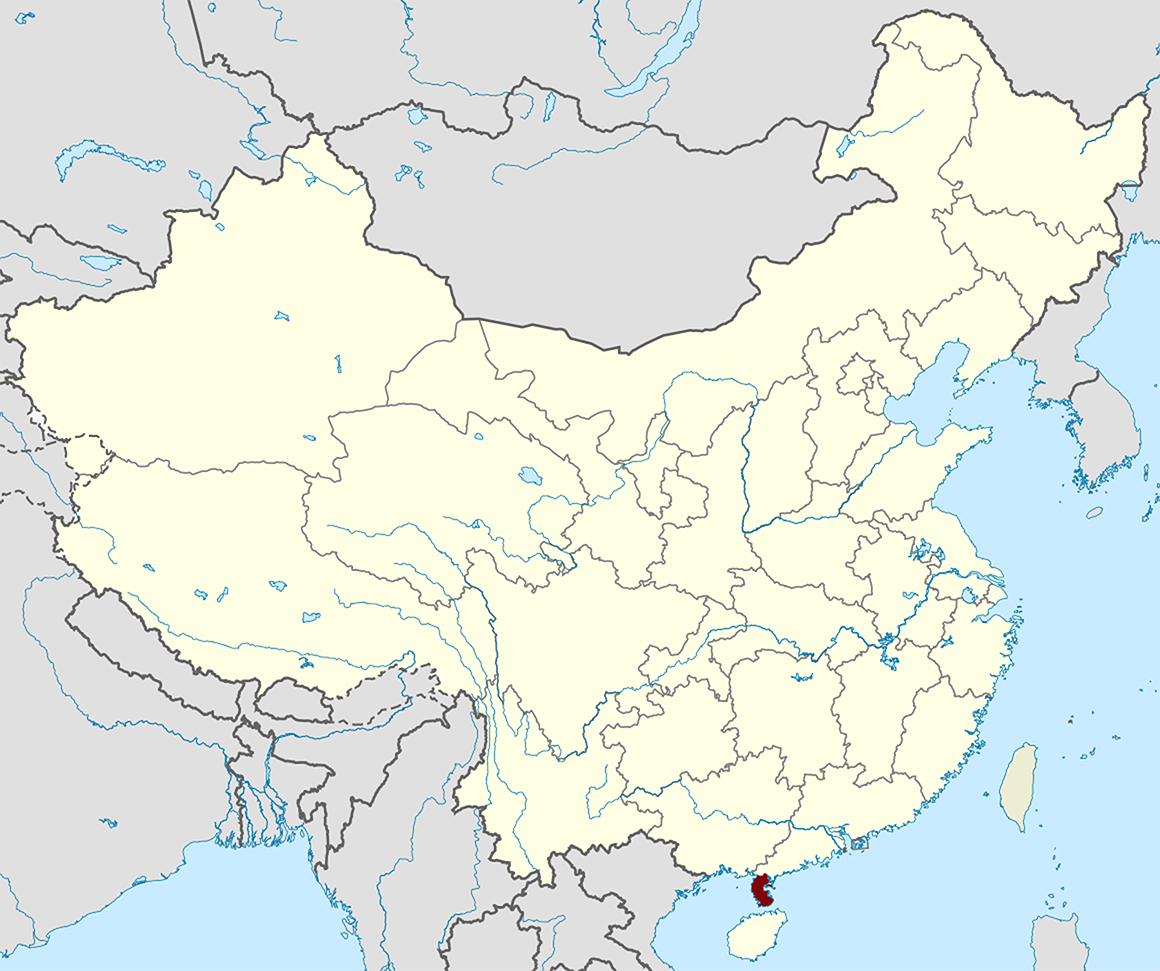
- Population
  - 740s or 750s: 20,572
  - 1070s or 1080s: Unknown, 13,784 households
- History
  - Preceded by: Donghe Prefecture (東合州)
  - Created: 634 (Tang dynasty)
  - Abolished: 1278 (Yuan dynasty)
  - Succeeded by: Leizhou Pacification Commission (雷州安撫司)
- Contained within
  - Circuit: Tang dynasty: Lingnan Circuit; Song dynasty: Guangnan Circuit; Guangnan West Circuit

Lei Prefecture
- Chinese: 雷州
Transcriptions
Standard Mandarin
- Hanyu Pinyin: Léi Zhōu

Haikang Commandery
- Chinese: 海康郡
Transcriptions
Standard Mandarin
- Hanyu Pinyin: Hǎikāng Jùn

Leizhou or Lei Prefecture was a zhou (prefecture) in imperial China in Leizhou Peninsula, Guangdong. It existed from 634 to 1329, but between 742 and 758 it was known as Haikang Commandery (also translated as Haikang Prefecture).

The modern county-level city Leizhou retains its name.

== Counties ==
Lei Prefecture administered the following counties (縣) through history:

1. Haikang (海康), roughly modern Leizhou.
2. Suixi (遂溪), roughly modern Suixi County, Guangdong and Mazhang District, Zhanjiang. Suixi was created in 742 by merging two counties, Tiepa (鐵杷) and Shenchuan (椹川).
3. Xuwen (徐聞), roughly modern Xuwen County.
