= 132 BC Yellow River flood =

Natural disaster in China

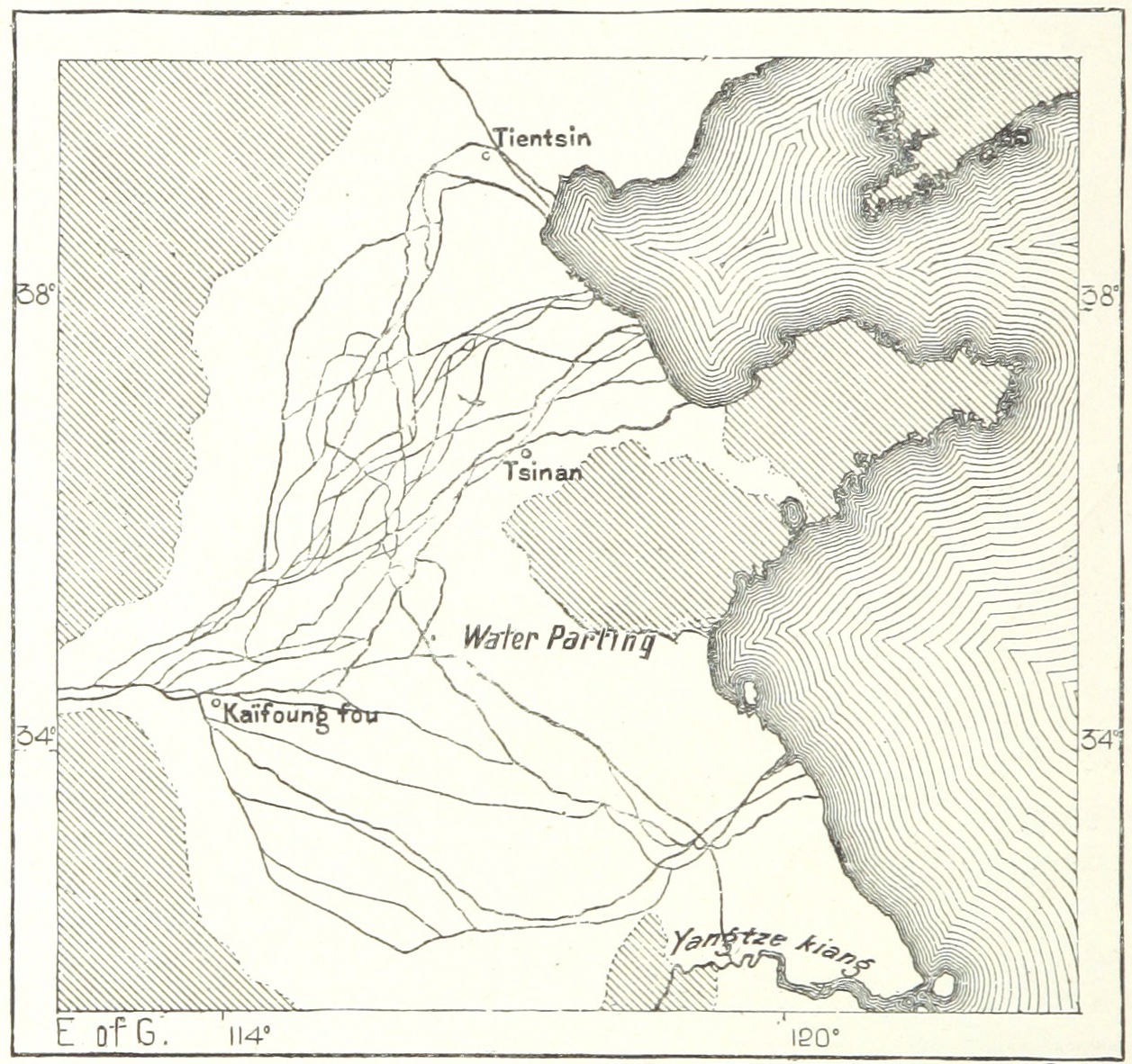
- A 19th-century map of the Yellow River's many courses. In 132 BC, its route shifted from north of Shandong one of the paths to its south.
- Traditional Chinese: 前132年黃河洪水
- Simplified Chinese: 前132年黄河洪水
Transcriptions
Standard Mandarin
- Hanyu Pinyin: qián 132 nián Huánghé hóngshuǐ
- Wade–Giles: ch'ien 132 nien Huang Ho hung-shui

The 132 BC Yellow River flood was a major flood of China's Yellow River in the year 132 BC during the reign of the emperor Liu Chi, posthumously known as the Wu Emperor of the Western Han dynasty. The river breached the dyke at Dingtao in Shandong, covered the Juye Plain, and reached the channel of the Si River, following it south of Shandong to flow into the lower Huai and the Yellow Sea. After the initial attempt to repair the damage failed, the Han Empire did nothing further for decades, partially due to government corruption and partially due to imperial superstition. The dyke was finally restored and the river returned to its former channel in 109 BC.

The story of the breach and its repair form a large section of Sima Qian's c. 91 BC Records of the Grand Historian and the historian himself was involved with the 109 BC repairs in a minor capacity.

== History ==
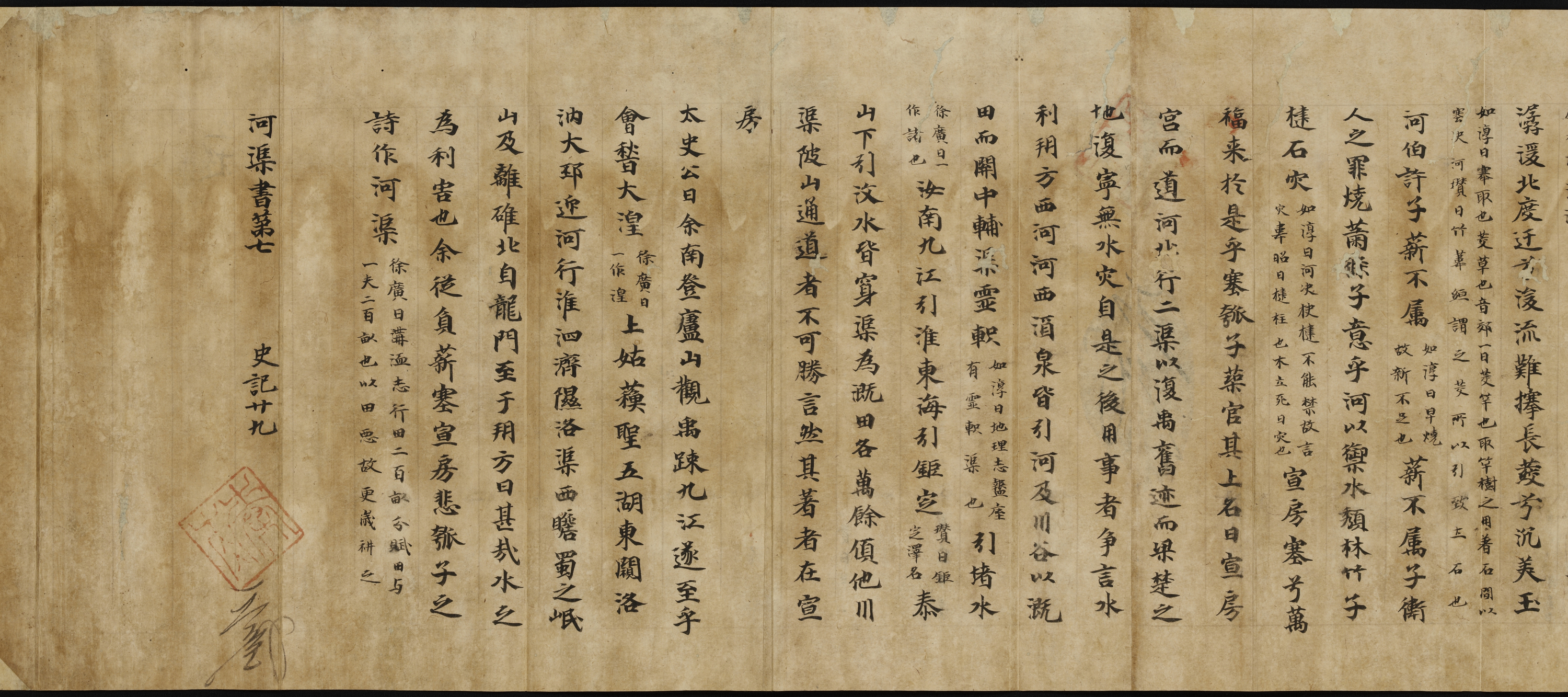
The Book of Rivers and Canals, Vol. 29 of the Records of the Grand Historian, largely details the circumstances of the 132 BC flood and Sima Qian's own first-hand account of the 109 BC restoration of the Huzi dyke by the Wu Emperor of the Western Han

=== Breach ===
In 132 BC, the swelling Yellow River burst the dyke at Huzi in Jiyin Commandery (now Dingtao, Shandong) and flooded the Juye Plain. The swell was large enough that it reached the course of the Si River, shifting its own main course to follow it south of the Shandong Peninsula to the Huai River and Yellow Sea. The imperial government organized a corvee under Ji An (汲黯) and Zheng Dangshi (鄭當時) to repair the breach but the river nearly immediately burst through again, again flooding the plain and flowing into the Si and Huai. The river was then allowed to remain in its new course for decades.

The flood and imperial responses to it form the bulk of the Yellow River section of Sima Qian's Records of the Grand Historian, an account that differs from many other sections of the Records in offering little criticism of the Wu Emperor's actions. In fact, taken in conjunction with other sections of the Records that relate locals' hardships, the Yellow River section is clearly focused in a way intended to shield the emperor from blame.

=== Delay ===
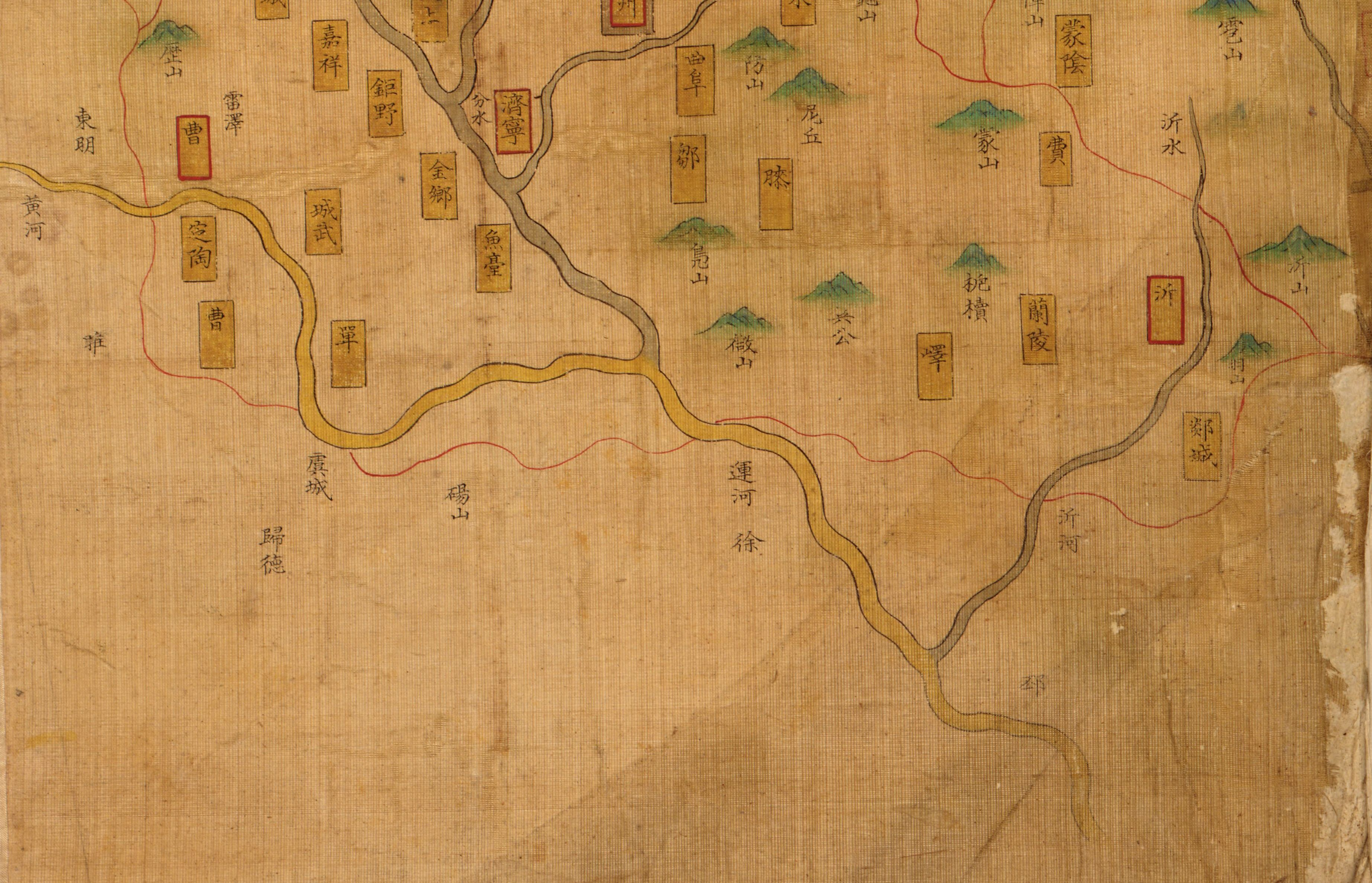
Detail of a Ming-era map of Shandong, showing the Yellow River (in gold) following a similar course southeast around the peninsula, starting near Huzi (定陶, Dingtao)

The river's dikes were not mostly repaired until 109 BC, when the river was returned to its previous northern course, probably by mortise and tenon floodworks. The last phases of this reconstruction were personally overseen by the Wu Emperor. Historians have generally attributed the extremely slow response to economic constraints on the Han Empire during its Xiongnu Wars, while Sima Qian offers the specific reasons that the dowager empress Wang's brother, the chancellor Tian Fen (田蚡, died c. 130 BC), avoided further repairs in the 130s BC because it increased the value of his own properties to north of the river's new course and the emperor waited decades to correct the issue because he was not made aware of its severity until that time. The empire should have had sufficient resources until around 124 BC to continue attempts at repair but Tian Fen argued to the superstitious emperor that the great change in the great river must be the will of Heaven, aided in his appeal by being part of the young emperor's personal Confucian faction whereas Ji and Zheng were officials who had been allied with the Taoist faction of the grand empress dowager Dou. The emperor was able to claim he had not personally witnessed the flooded region's distress until his 110 BC pilgrimage to Mount Tai for the Feng and Shan sacrifices but would have been received decades of annual reports from the affected areas by then, detailing both the agricultural lands impacted by increased flooding in Liang (Shandong, Henan, & Anhui) and Chu (Jiangsu & Anhui) and the massive local expenses (mostly unsuccessfully) attempting to provide for flood control along the new course.

However, the emperor had already begun considering repairing the breach before his trip. Sima Qian's Records notes that one of the main attractions of the magician and alchemist Luan An in 113 BC was his claimed ability to restore the dyke at Huzi and divert the Yellow River back to its former course. Whether before Luan or inspired by him, the Wu Emperor is said to have now felt that restoring the proper course of the river was the will of Heaven, an act worthy of the legendary Xia patriarch Yu the Great, and an essential step on his path to immortality. (In similar fashion, he emulated Shun with his inspection tours beginning in 113 BC and Yao with his 104 BC calendrical reform.) The drought that occurred in 109 BC was then taken as further divine assistance and utilized in order to complete the needed repairs. By this time, the salt and iron monopolies—instituted by the ministry of agriculture in 117 BC—had again filled the imperial coffers.

=== Repair ===
Once reconstruction began under Ji An's younger brother Ji Ren (汲仁) and Guo Chang (郭昌), the emperor travelled to personally oversee the work, composed an hymn—the Ode of Huzi (《瓠子歌》)—beseeching the Lord of the River for his blessing, and cast jade and a white horse into the river as an offering. He ordered the court historian Sima Qian and other officials to join the laborers in carrying bundles of sticks to shore up the floodwall. Upon the dyke's restoration, the river returned to flowing north and the emperor had the Xuanfeng Temple (宣房宮) built at the site. The emperor then funded a spate of canal and irrigation projects around the empire.

== See also ==
- Other floods of the Yellow River
- Records of the Grand Historian and Sima Qian
