= Leizhou Peninsula =

Peninsula in Guangdong, China

Native name: 雷州半岛
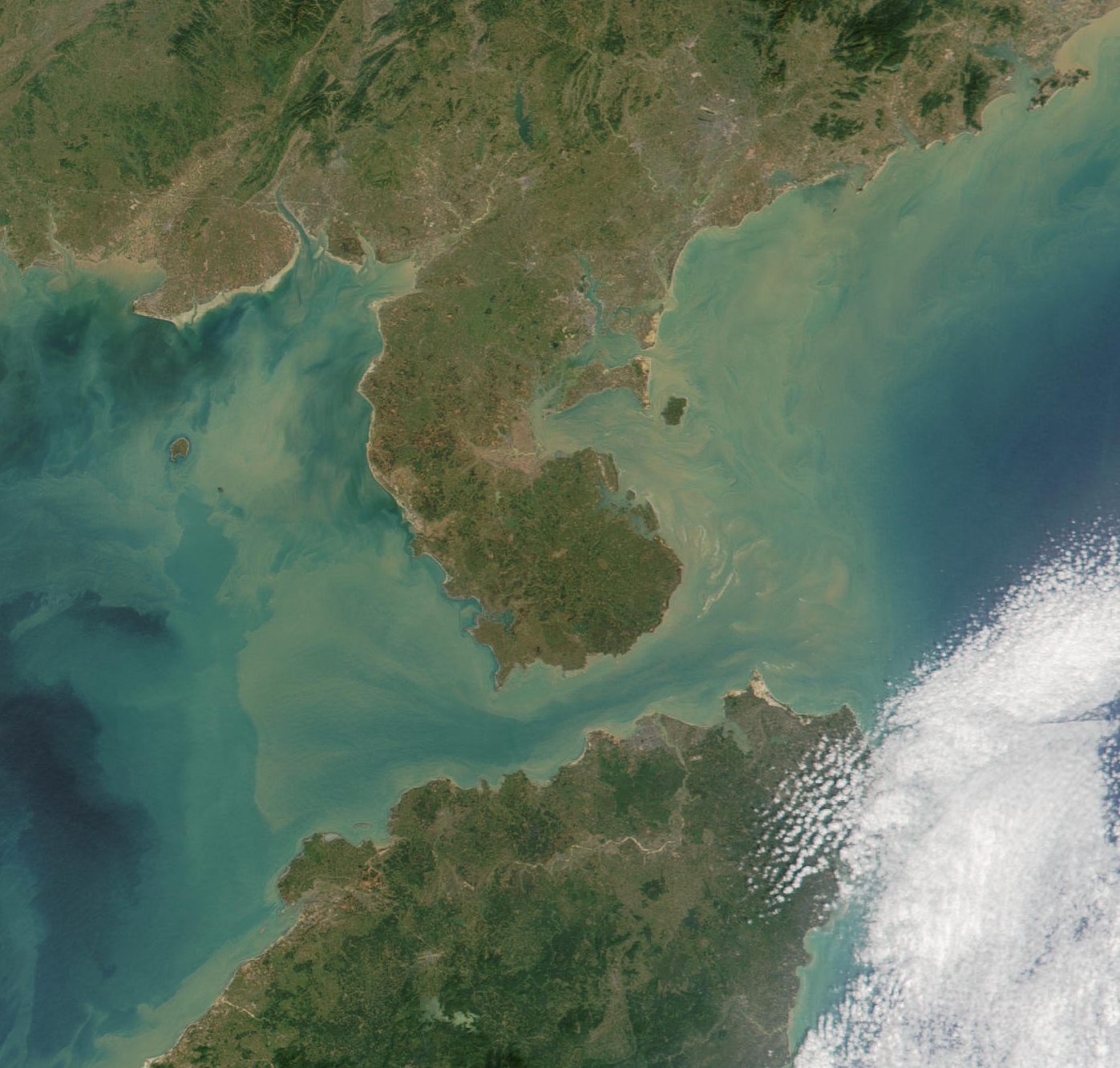
- A satellite image of the peninsula

Geography
- Coordinates: 21°N 110°E
- Area: 8,500 km^{2} (3,300 sq mi)

Administration
- China
- Province: Guangdong
- Largest settlement: Zhanjiang

Demographics
- Population: 5,694,245 (2015)

The Leizhou Peninsula, alternately romanized as the Luichow Peninsula, is a peninsula in the southernmost part of Guangdong province in South China. As of 2015, the population of the peninsula was 5,694,245. The largest city by population and area on the peninsula is Zhanjiang.

== History ==
Trade was once welcoming at cities of Leizhou Peninsula. During the 19th century, the area was a hotbed of piracy; many pirates such as Zheng Yi were based in the area.

== Geography ==
The Leizhou Peninsula is the third largest peninsula in China with an area of c. 8,500 square kilometers (3,300 sq mi) located on the southwestern end of Zhanjiang, Guangdong with the Gulf of Tonkin to the west and the 30 km wide Qiongzhou Strait to the south, separating the peninsula from Hainan Island.

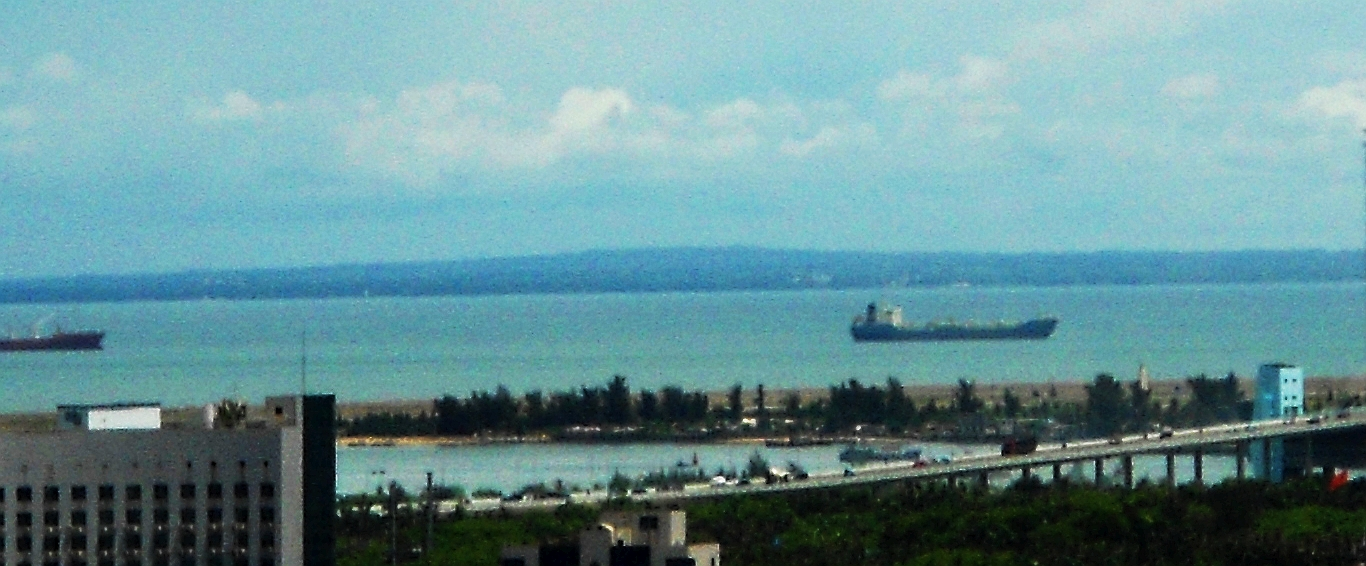
The Leizhou Peninsula viewed from Haikou City, Hainan over the Qiongzhou Strait.

Geologically, basalt terraces account for 43% of the peninsula's area. The rest is divided up between marine terraces (27%) and alluvial plains (17%). Leizhou Peninsula is dotted with a few dormant volcanoes, beaches, and low-lying diluvial plains.

Leizhou has two separate volcanic fields: a Pleistocene–Holocene field at the northern end of the peninsula west of Zhanjiang (雷北火山群, Leibei Huoshanqun) and the northern end of the Qionglei or Leiqiong volcanic field, which extends across the strait into northern Hainan (雷南火山群, Leinan Huoshanqun). The volcanoes derive from the east-to-west tectonic extension and thinning of the lithosphere connected with the creation of the South China Sea's basin. Two Pleistocene-era basaltic stratovolcanoes are Yingfengling (鹰峰岭) and Tianyang (田洋), 15 km (9.3 mi) apart in the center of the peninsula. There is also a third volcanic field responsible for some of the islands offshore (火山岩岛屿, Huoshanyan Daoyu).

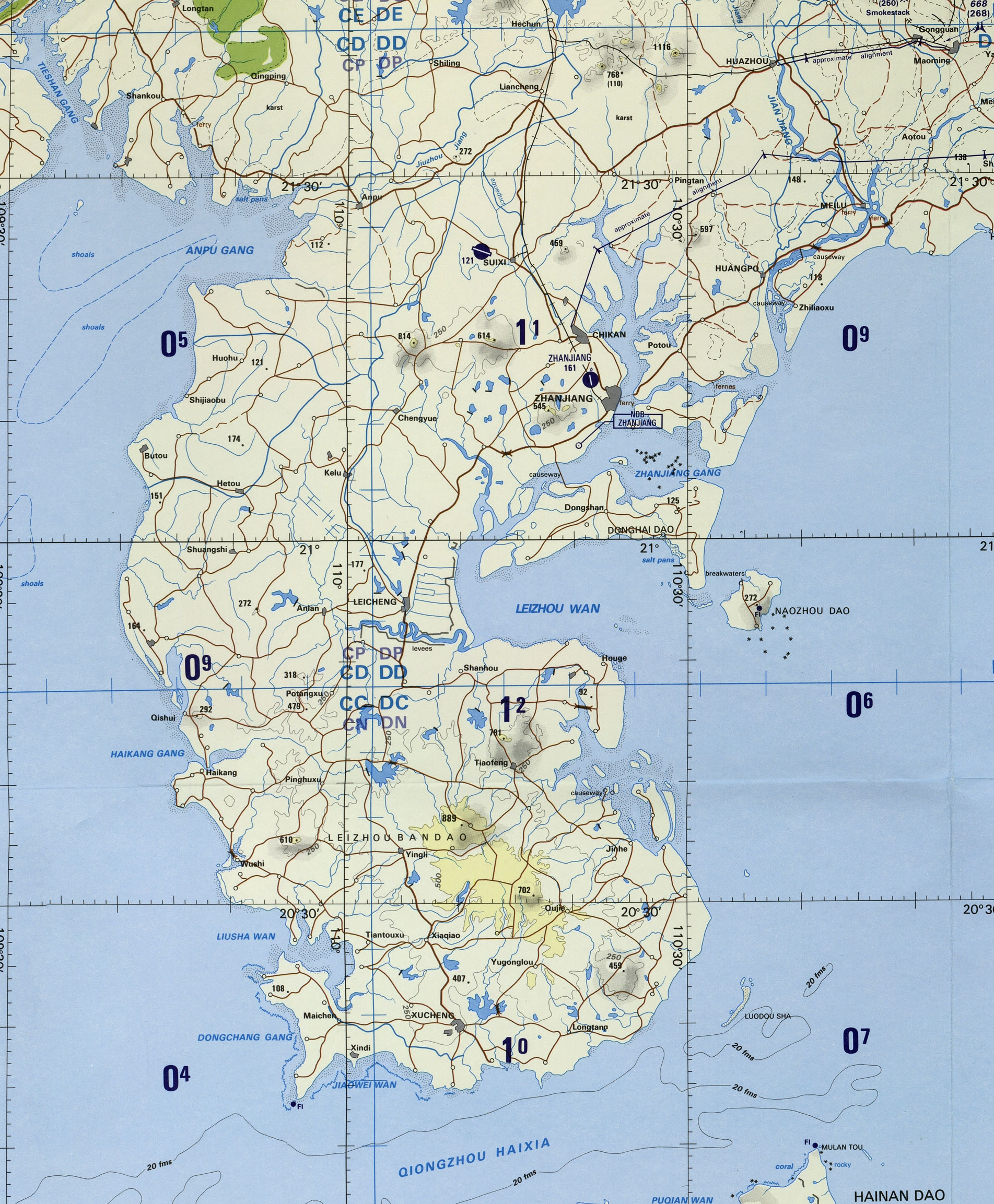
Topographical map

== Wildlife ==
Hepu National Sanctuary of Dugongs was created west of the peninsula to protect endangered wildlife especially marine mammals. Vicinity to the peninsula, such as the Leizhou Bay has declared to be parts of the Chinese white dolphin sanctuary holding the second largest population in the nation. Dugongs still occur in small numbers. Some Bryde's whales, minke whales, and whale sharks still occur in the adjacent waters including Hainan Island and Gulf of Tonkin waters such as off Tieshangang District, Islands of Weizhou and Xieyang.

Critically endangered whales such as North Pacific right whales and western gray whales, humpback whales, and blue whales were once known to occur around the peninsula in the winter and spring to calve. Waters such as Wailuo Harbor were ideal habitats for these giants. These whales were heavily hunted and were wiped out by Japanese whalers in these regions. (Japanese whalers established whaling stations at various sites along the Chinese and Korean coasts including on the island of Hainan and at Daya Bay).

== Climate ==
The peninsula has a humid subtropical climate. The region is under the influence of continental northeastern monsoons and maritime southeastern and southwestern monsoons. Typhoons occasionally occur, both from the Pacific Ocean and the South China Sea. Annual precipitation is 1,400 to 1,700 millimeters (55 to 67 in).

== Settlements ==
- Kouang Tchéou Wan, former French colony now located in Zhanjiang, a port city

== See also ==
- Stone dogs in the Leizhou Peninsula
- Volcanoes of Leizhou at the German Wikipedia (in German)
