= Sword Stained with Royal Blood (disambiguation) =

Sword Stained with Royal Blood may refer to:

- Sword Stained with Royal Blood, known as Bi Xue Jian (or Bixue Jian) in Chinese, is a novel by Jin Yong.
- Films adapted from the novel:
  - Sword of Blood and Valour, a two-part Hong Kong film released in 1958 and 1959
  - Sword Stained with Royal Blood (1981 film), a Hong Kong film
  - The Sword Stained with Royal Blood (film), a 1993 Hong Kong film
- Television series adapted from the novel:
  - Sword Stained with Royal Blood (1977 TV series), a 1977 Hong Kong television series
  - Sword Stained with Royal Blood (1985 TV series), a 1985 Hong Kong television series
  - Crimson Sabre, a 2000 Hong Kong television series
  - Sword Stained with Royal Blood (2007 TV series), a 2007 Chinese television series
