= List of crime films of the 2010s =

This is a list of crime films released in the 2010s.

== 2010 ==
Title	Director	Cast	Country	Subgenre/Notes
2010
22 Bullets	Richard Berry	Jean Reno, Kad Merad, Richard Berry	France	Crime thriller
Animal Kingdom	David Michôd	James Frecheville, Ben Mendelsohn, Joel Edgerton	Australia	
Beyond the Grave	Davi de Oliveira Pinheiro	Daniel Bacchieri, Leandro Lefa, Rafael Tombini	Brazil	
Brighton Rock	Rowan Joffé	Sam Riley, Andrea Riseborough, Helen Mirren	United Kingdom	Crime thriller
Brooklyn's Finest	Antoine Fuqua	Richard Gere, Don Cheadle, Ethan Hawke	United States	
Cold Fish	Sion Sono	Denden, Megumi Kagurazaka, Tetsu Watanabe	Japan	Crime thriller
I Saw the Devil	Kim Jee-woon	Lee Byung-hun, Choi Min-sik, Chun Kook-Haun	South Korea	Crime thriller
The Killer Inside Me	Michael Winterbottom	Casey Affleck, Kate Hudson, Jessica Alba	United Kingdom; United States	
The Killing Jar	Mark Young	Michael Madsen, Harold Perrineau Jr., Amber Benson	United States	Crime thriller
London Boulevard	William Monahan	Keira Knightley, Colin Farrell, Ben Chaplin	United Kingdom	
The Next Three Days	Paul Haggis	Russell Crowe, Elizabeth Banks, Liam Neeson	United States	Crime drama, crime thriller
Outrage	Beat Takeshi Kitano		Japan	
The Robber	Benjamin Heisenberg	Andreas Lust, Franziska Weisz, Markus Schleinzer	Germany; Austria	
Small Town Murder Songs	Ed Gass-Donnelly	Peter Stormare, Jill Hennessy, Martha Plimpton	Canada	
A Somewhat Gentle Man	Hans Petter Moland	Stellan Skarsgård, Bjørn Floberg, Gard Eidsvold	Norway	
Takers	John Luessenhop	Matt Dillon, Idris Elba, Tip "T.I" Harris	United States	
The Town	Ben Affleck	Ben Affleck, Rebecca Hall, Jon Hamm	United States	
Twelve	Joel Schumacher	Kiefer Sutherland, Chace Crawford, Anthony Quarles	France; United States	

== 2011 ==
Title	Director	Cast	Country	Subgenre/Notes
2011
30 Minutes or Less	Ruben Fleischer	Jesse Eisenberg, Danny McBride, Aziz Ansari	United States	Crime comedy
The Big Bang	Tony Krantz	Antonio Banderas, Sienna Guillory, James Van Der Beek	United States	Crime comedy
Bullhead	Michaël R. Roskam		Belgium	
Delhi Belly	Abhinay Deo	Imran Khan, Kunaal Roy Kapur, Vir Das	India	Crime comedy
Drive	Nicolas Winding Refn	Ryan Gosling, Carey Mulligan, Bryan Cranston	United States	Crime thriller
Flypaper	Rob Minkoff	Patrick Dempsey, Ashley Judd, Tim Blake Nelson	United States	Crime comedy
Hodejegerne	Morten Tyldum	Aksel Hennie, Synnove Macody Lund, Nikolaj Coster-Waldau	Norway	
Kill the Irishman	Jonathan Hensleigh	Ray Stevenson, Vincent D'Onofrio, Val Kilmer	United States	
Life Without Principle	Johnnie To	Lau Ching Wan, Richie Jen, Denise Ho	Hong Kong	
The Lincoln Lawyer	Brad Furman	Matthew McConaughey, Ryan Phillippe, Marisa Tomei, Josh Lucas, Bryan Cranston, Michael Peña	United States	
Pinching Penny	Dan Glaser	Steven Molony, Timothy J. Meyer, Ginny Glaser Lauren J. Wertz	United States	Crime thriller
S.I.U.	Hwang Byung-guk	Uhm Tae-woong, Joo Won, Jung Jin-young	South Korea	
Snowtown	Justin Kurzel	Lucas Pittaway, Daniel Henshall, Louise Harris	Australia	Crime drama, true crime
Tower Heist	Brett Ratner	Ben Stiller, Eddie Murphy, Casey Affleck	United States	Crime comedy, heist film

== 2012 ==
Title	Director	Cast	Country	Subgenre/Notes
2012
ACAB – All Cops Are Bastards	Stefano Sollima		France; Italy	Crime drama
Black's Game	Oskar Thor Axelsson		Iceland	
Cleanskin	Hadi Hajaig	Sean Bean, Charlotte Rampling, James Fox	United Kingdom	
Contraband	Baltasar Kormákur	Mark Wahlberg, Kate Beckinsale, Ben Foster	United States	Crime thriller
The Dark Knight Rises	Christopher Nolan	Christian Bale, Anne Hathaway, Tom Hardy	United States	
Drug War	Johnnie To	Sun Hong-Lei, Louis Koo, Huang Yi	China; Hong Kong	Crime thriller
End of Watch	David Ayer	Jake Gyllenhaal, Michael Peña, Anna Kendrick	United States	Crime thriller
Fury	David Weaver	Samuel L. Jackson, Luke Kirby, Ruth Negga	Canada	
Gangs of Wasseypur - Part 1	Anurag Kashyap	Manoj Bajpai, Richa Chadda, Reemma Sen	India	Crime drama
Gangs of Wasseypur - Part 2	Anurag Kashyap	Nawazuddin Siddiqui, Richa Chadda, Huma Qureshi	India	Crime drama
Get the Gringo	Adrian Grunberg	Mel Gibson, Jésus Ochoa, Daniel Jiménez Cacho	United States	
Hit and Run	Dax Shepard	Dax Shepard, Kristen Bell, Bradley Cooper	United States	Crime comedy
The Iceman	Ariel Vromen	Michael Shannon, Winona Ryder, Chris Evans	United States	
Ill Manors	Ben Drew	Riz Ahmed, Ed Skrein, Natalie Press	United Kingdom	Crime thriller
Killing Them Softly	Andrew Dominik	Brad Pitt, Scoot McNairy, Ben Mendelsohn	United States	
Lawless	John Hillcoat	Shia LaBeouf, Tom Hardy, Jason Clarke	United States	Crime drama
Lethal Hostage	Cheng Er	Sun Honglei, May Wang, Ni Dahong	China	
Man on a Ledge	Asger Leth	Sam Worthington, Elizabeth Banks, Jamie Bell	United States	Crime thriller
Nameless Gangster: Rules of the Time	Yoon Jong-bin	Choi Min-sik, Ha Jeong-u, Jo Jin-ung	South Korea	
Outrage Beyond	Takeshi Kitano	Takeshi Kitano, Toshiyuki Nishida, Tomokazu Miura	Japan	
Passion	Brian De Palma	Rachel McAdams, Noomi Rapace, Karoline Herfurth	United States	Crime thriller
The Place Beyond the Pines	Derek Cianfrance	Ryan Gosling, Bradley Cooper, Eva Mendes	United States	Crime drama
Robot & Frank	Jake Schreier	Frank Langella, Susan Sarandon, Peter Sarsgaard	United States	Crime comedy
Safe	Boaz Yakin	Jason Statham, Catherine Chan, Robert John Burke	United States	
Savages	Oliver Stone	Taylor Kitsch, Aaron Johnson, Salma Hayek	United States	
The Scent	Kim Hyoung-jun	Park Hui-sun, Park Shi-yeon, Ju Sang-uk	South Korea	
The Thieves	Choi Dong-hoon	Kim Yoon-seok, Lee Jung-jae, Kim Hye-soo	South Korea	

== 2013 ==
Title	Director	Cast	Country	Subgenre/Notes
2013
2 Guns	Baltasar Kormákur	Denzel Washington, Mark Wahlberg, Paula Patton	United States	Crime comedy
Ain't Them Bodies Saints	David Lowery	Rooney Mara, Casey Affleck, Ben Foster	United States	Prison film
American Hustle	David O. Russell	Christian Bale, Bradley Cooper, Amy Adams	United States	Crime drama
Blind Detective	Johnnie To	Andy Lau, Sammi Cheng, Guo Tao	Hong Kong; China	
The Bling Ring	Sofia Coppola	Emma Watson, Leslie Mann, Taissa Farmiga	Germany; United States	Crime drama
Blue Caprice	Alexandre Moors	Isaiah Washington, Tequan Richmond, Tim Blake Nelson	United States	
Blue Ruin	Jeremy Saulnier	Macon Blair, Amy Hargreaves, Bonnie Johnson	United States	Crime drama
Cold Eyes	Cho Ui-seok, Kim Byeong-seo	Sul Kyung-gu, Jung Woo-sung, Han Hyo-joo	South Korea	
The Counselor	Ridley Scott	Michael Fassbender, Cameron Diaz Javier Bardem	United States	Crime thriller
Crimes of Passion	Gao Qunshu	Angelababy, Huang Xiaoming, Jae Hui	China	
The Devil's Path	Kazuy Shiraishi	Takayuki Yamada, Pierre Taki, Chizuru Ikewaki	Japan	
Gangster Squad	Ruben Fleischer	Sean Penn, Ryan Gosling, Josh Brolin	United States	
The Keeper of Lost Causes	Mikkel Norgaard	Nikolaj Lee Kaas, Fares Fares, Sonja Richter	Denmark	Police detective film
Man of Tai Chi	Keanu Reeves	Keanu Reeves, Tiger Chen, Iko Uwais	United States	
New World	Park Hoon-jung	Lee Jung-jae, Choi Min-sik, Hwang Jung-min	South Korea	
Only God Forgives	Nicolas Winding Refn	Ryan Gosling, Kristin Scott Thomas, Vithaya Pansringarm	Denmark; France	
Prisoners	Denis Villeneuve	Hugh Jackman, Jake Gyllenhaal, Melissa Leo	United States	Crime drama
Shield of Straw	Takashi Miike	Takao Osawa, Nanako Matsushima, Goro Kishitani	Japan	
The Shifting	Julio Saldarriaga	Carlos Acuña, Matthew Alan, Felix Avitia, Yeniffer Behrens, Tonita Castro, Chris Paradice Daniels, Kaitlyn Dias, Alice Dinnean, Judy Echavez, David Fernandez Jr., Carmina Garay, Cesar Garcia, Vanessa Hidalgo, RoseAnn Kelley, Samantha Kelly, Kim Kendall, Melina Lizette, Eddy Martin, Mauricio Mendoza, Martin Morales, Emily Ozrey, Robert Romanus, Eddie Ruiz, Eric St. John, Kristyn Toney, Craig Tsuyumine, Reggie Watkins and Morgan Larson	United States; Colombia	Action crime drama film
Trance	Danny Boyle	James McAvoy, Vincent Cassel, Rosario Dawson	United Kingdom	Caper, crime thriller
The Wolf of Wall Street	Martin Scorsese	Leonardo DiCaprio, Jonah Hill, Margot Robbie	United States	Crime drama

== 2014 ==
Title	Director	Cast	Country	Subgenre/Notes
2014
Black & White: The Dawn of Justice	Tsai Yueh-Hsun	Mark Chao, Lin Gengxin, Huang Bo	China; Taiwan; Hong Kong	Crime action
Black Coal, Thin Ice	Diao Yi'nan	Liao Fan, Gwei Lun-mei, Wang Xuebing	China	
The Boundary	Wang Tao	Liu Ye, Vincent Zhao, Choo Ja-hyun	China	Suspense action crime drama
The Breaking Point	James C. Hunter	Erik Grey, Diana Lovell, Reggie Peters, Roy Williams Jr. and Sean Nelson	United States	Action crime drama
Nightcrawler	Dan Gilroy	Jake Gyllenhaal, Rene Russo, Riz Ahmed	United States	Crime thriller
Pale Moon	Daihachi Yoshida	Rie Miyazawa, Sosuke Ikematsu, Satomi Kobayashi	Japan	Crime drama
Poker Night	Greg Francis	Beau Mirchoff, Ron Perlman, Titus Welliver	Canada; United States	Action-Crime-Thriller
The Raid 2	Gareth Evans	Iko Uwais, Arifin Putra, Oka Entara	Indonesia	Crime drama, gangster film
Sabotage	David Ayer	Arnold Schwarzenegger, Sam Worthington, Terrence Howard	United States	Crime thriller
Scratch	Maninder Chana	Julie Romaniuk, Craig Cyr, Romaine Waite, Jojo Karume, J.J. Reville, Len Silvini and Justin Bott	Canada	Action crime comedy-drama
Sin City: A Dame to Kill For	Frank Miller, Robert Rodriguez	Mickey Rourke, Jessica Alba, Josh Brolin	United States	
Target	Yang Jiang	Song Yang, Yang Chengjun, Kara Wong	China	Action suspense crime

== 2015 ==
Title	Director	Cast	Country	Subgenre/Notes
2015
12 Citizens	Xu Ang	He Bing, Han Tongsheng, Qian Bo	China	Suspense crime drama
The Big Short	Adam McKay	Christian Bale, Steve Carell, Ryan Gosling	United States	
Scratch	Maninder Chana	Julie Romaniuk, Craig Cyr, Romaine Waite, Jojo Karume, J.J. Reville, Len Silvini and Justin Bott	Canada	Action crime comedy-drama
Straight Outta Compton	F. Gary Gray	O'Shea Jackson Jr, Jason Mitchell, Corey Hawkins, Paul Giamatti	United States	Biographical
War on a String	Li Kai	Vincent Chiao, Andrew Lin, Lin Jinfeng	China	Suspense crime action

== 2016 ==
Title	Director	Cast	Country	Subgenre/Notes
2016
South of 8	Tony Olmos	Brian Patrick Butler, George Jac, Jennifer Paredes, Kathryn Schott, Raye Richards	United States	Crime drama thriller
