= The Heroine of the Yangs =

1998 Hong Kong television series

- DVD cover for Season 1
- 穆桂英
- Genre: Costume drama; Wuxia
- Based on: The Generals of the Yang Family
- Written by: Lai Chun
- Directed by: Wen Weiji
- Starring: Amy ChanVincent Chiao; Gilbert Lam; Annie Man; Cao Cuifen
- Opening theme: "Heroic Appearance on Horseback" (馬上英姿) by Amy Chan
- Ending theme: "Everlasting Love" (情緣萬世長) by Amy Chan and Johnny Yip
- Composer: Wong Bong-yin
- Country of origin: Hong Kong
- Original language: Cantonese
- No. of seasons: 2
- No. of episodes: 60

Production
- Producer: Yeung Siu-hung
- Running time: ≈45 minutes per episode

Original release
- Network: ATV
- Release: 1998

Related
- The Great General (1994)

The Heroine of the Yangs (穆桂英) is a two-season Hong Kong costume drama television series based on the legend of Mu Guiying from The Generals of the Yang Family collection. Starring Amy Chan as Mu Guiying, the series was produced by and first aired on ATV in Hong Kong in 1998.

== Synopsis ==
The series is divided into two seasons:

- "Breaking the Heavenly Gate Formation" (大破天門陣): 32 episodes
- "The Twelve Widows Go on a Campaign in the West" (十二寡婦征西) / "Mu Guiying Leads Troops into Battle" (穆桂英掛帥): 28 episodes

The first season introduces Mu Guiying and follows the story of how she met Yang Zongbao, became a member of the Yang family, and joined the Yangs in defending the Song Empire from invasion by the Liao Empire. The second season is about the widows of the men in the Yang family continuing their husbands' legacy by leading Song forces into battle against Western Xia.

== Cast ==
- Amy Chan as Mu Guiying
- Vincent Chiao as Yang Zongbao
- Gilbert Lam as Yelü Haonan
- Annie Man as Yang Paifeng
- Chung Yeung as Yelü Zongyuan
- Tam Bing-man as Pang Ji
- Cao Cuifen as She Saihua
- Gong Suet-far as Empress Dowager Xiao
- Szema Wah Lung as Chen Xiyi
- Loong Koon-tin as Emperor Renzong of Song
- Yeung Chak-lam as Yang Yanzhao (Yang Liulang)
- Paw Hee-ching as Princess Chai
- Ma Chung-tak as Yang Yande (Yang Wulang)
- Lai Sze-ka as Princess Yuanluo
- Tsang Wai-ming as Jiao Tinggui
- Wong Oi-yiu as Yang Yanqi (Yang Bamei)
- To On-yan as Yang Yanying (Yang Jiumei)
- Tam Siu-ying as Madam Zhou (Yang Daniang)
- Chan Lai-wun as Geng Jinhua (Yang Erniang)
- Yiu Chi-wun as Madam Luo (Yang Sanniang)
- Ng Wun-yee as Lady Luo (Yang Siniang)
- Chu Yin-chan as Consort Pang
- So Chong as Meng Dingguo
- Cheng Shu-fung as Zhao Defang
- Kam San as Meng Hongju
- Kwan Kin as Emperor Jingzong of Liao
- Lam Wai-sun as Aniu
- Ken Lo as Li Yuanhao
- Kwok Kum as Princess Baihua
- Kristal Tin as Yang Wenguang
