= On the Way =

On the Way may refer to:

== Film ==
- On the Way, a 1999 South Korean docudrama featuring Moon Geun-young
- On the Way (film), a 2014 Chinese-South Korean film directed by Kim Poog-ki
- On the Way, a 2014 Indian Malayalam-language film featuring Sidhartha Siva

== Music ==
=== Albums ===
- On the Way (The Boss album), 2013
- On the Way (Jandek album), 1988
- On the Way, by Abra Moore, 2007

=== Songs ===
- "On the Way" (Aina the End song), 2025
- "On the Way", by Dinosaur Jr. from Where You Been, 1993
- "On the Way", by Gerry Rafferty from Sleepwalking, 1982
- "On the Way", by Jhené Aiko from Chilombo, 2020
- "On the Way", by Onew from Dice, 2022
- "On the Way", by Paul McCartney from McCartney II, 1980
- "On the Way", by Twenty88 from Twenty88, 2016
- "OTW" (Khalid, Ty Dolla Sign and 6lack song), short for "On the Way", 2018

== See also ==
- Chalte Chalte (disambiguation)
