= The Great General =

1994 Hong Kong TV series

- DVD cover
- 碧血青天珍珠旗
- Genre: Costume drama; Fantasy
- Based on: The Generals of the Yang Family
- Starring: Norman Chu; Damian Lau; Joey Meng; Jackie Lui; Wong Jung; Yeung Yuk-mui; Mak Ging-ting; Loong Koon-tin; Chan Lai-sze; Tam Bing-man
- Opening theme: "Loyalty Unto Death" (碧血丹心) by Johnny Yip and Frances Yip
- Country of origin: Hong Kong
- Original language: Cantonese
- No. of episodes: 30

Production
- Running time: ≈45 minutes per episode

Original release
- Network: ATV
- Release: November 7 – December 16, 1994

Related
- Heroic Legend of the Yang's Family (1994)

The Great General (碧血青天珍珠旗) is a 1994 Hong Kong fantasy costume drama television series loosely based on The Generals of the Yang Family collection, and produced by ATV. It serves as a sequel to the television series Heroic Legend of the Yang's Family released earlier in the same year, with many cast members from the previous series reprising their roles.

== Synopsis ==
In legend, there is a Banner of Hegemony that allows its owner to rule the world. During the search for the banner under the Song emperor's order, Yang Zongbao finds an alleged owner of the banner and takes him back to meet the emperor. When the man turns out to be an assassin and severely wounds the emperor, Yang Zongbao is accused of treason and thrown into prison along with the Yang family.

Yang Zongbao's daughter-in-law, Wei Ling'er, who is pregnant at the time, flees to seek help from the upright official Bao Zheng. She encounters henchmen working for an ambitious Song prince plotting to seize the throne, but is saved by the loyal Song general Di Qing, who escorts her to meet Bao Zheng. With Bao Zheng's help, the Yangs prove their innocence and are released from prison.

Around this time, the banner is seen in Western Xia, so Di Qing and Yang Zongbao are sent by the Song emperor to retrieve it. Along the way, they meet Li Yuanhao, who is suffering from amnesia, and become sworn brothers with him. Later, Li Yuanhao regains his memory and remembers that he is actually the Western Xia emperor, so he turns against his sworn brothers in a power struggle for the banner.

== Cast ==
- Norman Chui as Yang Zongbao
- Mak Ging-ting as Mu Guiying
- Lee Heung-kam as She Saihua
- Paw Hee-ching as Princess Chai
- Ma Chung-tak as Yang Yande (Yang Wulang)
- Chan Li-wan as Yang Yanqi (Yang Bamei)
- Tam Siu-ying as Yang Yanying (Yang Jiumei)
- Lee Yun-ki as Yang Wenguang
- Leung Tin as Yang Ye
- Kingdom Yuen as Yang Paifeng
- Wong Yim-na as Wei Ling'er
- Wong Ching-ho as Yang Hong
- Tsang Wai-ming as Jiao Tinggui
- Keung Ho-men as Meng Dingguo
- Jackie Lui as Li Yuanhao
- Joey Meng as Gu Xiaolian
- Wong Mei as Du Qiuniang
- Poon Chi-man as Emperor Renzong of Song
- Damian Lau as Di Qing
- Wang Jung as Zhao Yu (Prince of Xiangyang)
- Loong Koon-tin as Lin Yun
- Choi Jai-man as Zhao Ning
- Yeung Yuk-mui as Princess Chaoyang / Lady Wangyue
- Tam Bing-man as Bao Zheng
- Fung Kwok as Gongsun Ce
- Yan Chi-keung as Zhan Zhao
- Tsang Chan-on as Wang Chao
- Cheng Yin as Ma Han
- Chao Siu-lun as Zhang Long
- Chow Wai-lun as Zhao Hu
- Szema Wah Lung as Wang Yanling
- Chan Lai-sze as Meng Shengnan
- Lee Suet-man as Consort Xu
- Tang Ho-kwong as Emperor Taizu of Song
- Leung Saan as Emperor Shengzong of Liao
