= Yang Paifeng =

- Generals of the Yang Family character
- from one 1882 print of the early 17th century novel Popular Romance of Generations of Loyal and Brave Yang Family Members (楊家府世代忠勇通俗演義)

Yang Paifeng
- Traditional Chinese: 楊排風
- Simplified Chinese: 杨排风
Transcriptions
Standard Mandarin
- Hanyu Pinyin: Yáng Páifēng
Yue: Cantonese
- Yale Romanization: Yeung^{4} Paai^{4}-fung^{1}
- Jyutping: Joeng^{4} Paai^{4}-fung^{1}

Yang Paifeng (楊排風) is a fictional character from the Generals of the Yang Family legends. She is a maid in the Tianbo House, home to the Yang family. She learned martial arts by imitating the moves practiced by Yang family members, using a metal rod that she was supposed to use to tend the kitchen fire. It is implied that she is not related to the family by blood, and took on the surname Yang because she was an orphan.

While most "good" servants in ancient Chinese literature are stereotypically subservient, Yang Paifeng is portrayed as outspoken, decisive and fearless.

== Portrayal in films and TV series ==
- Shu Pei-pei in The 14 Amazons (1972)
- Mary Hon in Young's Female Warrior (1981)
- Ding Cuihua in Generals of the Yang Family (1992)
- Kingdom Yuen in Heroic Legend of the Yang's Family (1994)
- Qu Ying in Kou Laoxi'er (1996)
- Annie Man in The Heroine of the Yangs (1998)
- Theresa Lee in Legendary Fighter: Yang's Heroine (2001)
- Chang Ting in The Fire Commander (2001)
- Yao Yang in The Heroine Mu Guiying (2004)
- Liu Shuang in Struggle for Imperial Power (2005)
- Shen Wanshi (child actress) in The Young Warriors (2006)
- Zhou Xiaofei in Legendary Amazons (2011)
- Niu Niu in Mu Guiying Takes Command (2011)
- Li Qian in Saving General Yang (2013)
