= 11th Golden Horse Awards =

1973 Taiwanese film awards ceremony

- Date: October 30, 1973
- Site: Zhongshan Hall, Taipei, Taiwan
- Organized by: Taipei Golden Horse Film Festival Executive Committee

Highlights
- Best Feature Film: The Escape
- Best Director: Cheng Kang; The 14 Amazons
- Best Actor: Peter Yang; The Escape
- Best Actress: Polly Kuan; A Heroic Fight
- Most awards: The 14 Amazons (4)

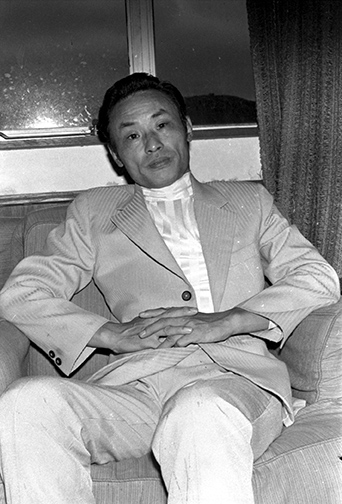
Cheng Gang, winner of the Best Director Award at the 11th Golden Horse Awards

The 11th Golden Horse Awards (Mandarin:第11屆金馬獎) took place on October 30, 1973 at Zhongshan Hall in Taipei, Taiwan.

== Winners and nominees ==
Winners are listed first, highlighted in boldface.

**Best Feature Film**: **The Escape**; The 14 Amazons (runner-up); Way of the Dragon (runner-up); Operation White Shirt (runner-up); Love Begins Here (runner-up); Tian Lun Le (runner-up)	**Best Documentary**: **Love and Confidence**; Scenery of Taiwan (runner-up); Jin Men Lin Ye (runner-up); Lu Jun Fei Dan Bu Dui (runner-up); Dun Mu Yan Xi (runner-up)
**Best Director**: **Cheng Kang — The 14 Amazons**	**Best Leading Actor**: **Peter Yang — The Escape**
**Best Leading Actress**: **Polly Kuan — A Heroic Fight**	**Best Supporting Actor**: **Wang Yu — Operation White Shirt**
**Best Supporting Actress**: **Lisa Lu — The 14 Amazons**	**Best Child Star**: **Tang Chi-wei — Tian Lun Le**
**Best Screenplay**: **Feng Ming Group — The Escape**	**Best Cinematography - Color**: **Lin Tsan-ting — Love Begins Here**
**Best Film Editing**: **Peter Cheung — Way of the Dragon**	**Best Art Direction - Color**: **Chou Chih-liang — The Young Ones**
**Best Music**: **Liu Chia-chang — Love Begins Here**	**Best Sound Recording**: **Wang Yong-hua — The 14 Amazons**
**Best Cinematography for Documentary**: **Koo Kong-yuen — Lu Jun Fei Dan Bu Dui**	**Best Planning for Documentary**: **Tuan Mu-hsuan — Love and Confidence**
**Special Award - Outstanding Performance**: **Chia Ling — The Escape**; **Ti Lung — Blood Brothers**	**Cultural Promotion Award**: **Zhong Guo Wen Zi Yan Bian**
