= Heroic Legend of the Yang's Family =

1994 Hong Kong TV series

- DVD cover
- 碧血青天楊家將
- Genre: Costume drama; Fantasy
- Based on: The Generals of the Yang Family
- Starring: Norman Chui; Jin Chao-chun; Paul Chun; Yan Chi-keung
- Opening theme: "Roaring at the Sky and Moon" (吼天喝月) by Frances Yip and Johnny Yip
- Country of origin: Hong Kong
- Original language: Cantonese
- No. of episodes: 30

Production
- Running time: ≈45 minutes per episode

Original release
- Network: ATV
- Release: September 26 – November 4, 1994

Related
- The Great General (1994)

Heroic Legend of the Yang's Family (碧血青天楊家將) is a 1994 Hong Kong fantasy costume drama television series based on stories from The Generals of the Yang Family collection and legends about Bao Zheng. Produced by and first aired on ATV in 1994, it was followed by a sequel, The Great General, which was released later in the same year.

== Synopsis ==
The Yangs, a family of warriors who serve the Song Empire, are defeated in a fierce battle against the Liao Empire when the Song general Pang Long, jealous of the Yangs' achievements, refuses to send reinforcements in time. While investigating the causes of the Song defeat, the Song official Bao Zheng discovers solid evidence that Pang Long has been secretly conspiring with Liao forces against the Yangs, so Pang Long is executed for treason. Pang Long's father Pang Hong, who holds the position of Grand Tutor in the Song government, blames the Yangs for his son's death and plots his revenge.

The Liao general Yelü Zongyuan learns that he is actually a long-lost member of the Yang family, so he defects to the Song Empire to reunite with the Yangs. Seeing it as a chance to take revenge on the Yangs, Pang Hong accuses Zongyuan of being a spy and tries to have him executed. When Bao Zheng foils his plot, Pang Hong turns against Yang Zongbao, another member of the Yang family, and frames him for treason with the aim of implicating all the Yangs and eliminating them.

As the Song–Liao war intensifies, the women of the Yang family put aside their differences and work together to join their husbands in resisting the Liao invasion. Unknown to them, Pang Hong has secretly contacted Liao forces and agreed to join them in getting rid of their common enemy: the Yang family.

== Cast ==
- Norman Chui as Yang Zongbao
- Jin Chao-chun as Bao Zheng
- Paul Chun as Pang Hong
- Yan Chi-keung as Zhan Zhao
- Choi Hiu-yi as Consort Pang
- Lee Yun-ki as Yang Wenguang
- Wong Yim-na as Wei Ling'er
- Ben Ng as Yelü Zongyuan
- Sin Ho-ying as Pang Long
- Berg Ng as Pang Hu
- Mak Ging-ting as Mu Guiying
- Poon Chi-man as Emperor Renzong of Song
- Lee Heung-kam as She Saihua
- Kingdom Yuen as Yang Paifeng
- Paw Hee-ching as Princess Chai
- Szema Wah Lung as Wang Yanling
- Chan Li-wan as Yang Yanqi (Yang Bamei)
- Tam Siu-ying as Yang Yanying (Yang Jiumei)
- Wang Ching-ho as Yang Hong
- Tsang Wai-ming as Jiao Tinggui
- Keung Ho-men as Meng Dingguo
- Fung Kwok as Gongsun Ce
- Tsang Chan-on as Wang Chao
- Cheng Yin as Ma Han
- Chao Siu-lun as Zhang Long
- Chow Wai-lun as Zhao Hu
- Eddy Ko as Yang Yanzhao (Yang Liulang)
