= The Enticement =

2022 Chinese web series

- Promotional poster
- Chinese: 诱惑
- Hanyu Pinyin: Yòuhuò
- Directed by: Wen Chenglin
- Starring: Leon Jay Williams; Eva Huang; Yang Zi
- Country of origin: China
- Original language: Mandarin
- No. of episodes: 34

Production
- Production location: Beijing
- Production companies: Beijing Television Art Center Co., Ltd. Sohu

Original release
- Network: Sohu
- Release: July 28 – August 13, 2022

The Enticement (Chinese: 诱惑) is a 2022 Chinese streaming television series directed by Wen Chenglin, and starring Leon Jay Williams, Eva Huang and Yang Zi. The series entered production in Beijing in September 2012. It was aired on Sohu on July 28, 2022.

== Plot ==
Before his death, Chen Tiannuo, president of the Tiannuo Group, gave two Dong Qichang paintings worth 200 million to Xia Wei, a descendant of the Xia family. At this time, Tiannuo Group faced a financial crisis and faced bankruptcy, forcing Chen Tiannuo's eldest son, Chen Jinyu, into a corner. Chen Jinyu thought that he wanted Xia Wei to marry his younger brother Chen Mingyu so that the Chen family would at least get part of the property, and the pure Xia Wei stepped into Chen Jinyu's trap step by step. In the process of Xia Wei and Chen Mingyu's contact, they finally fell in love, and at the same time, Xia Wei also discovered Chen Jinyu's conspiracy. Chen Mingyu can't face Xia Wei, and Xia Wei wakes up Mingyu with love. In the end, the lovers went through ups and downs and finally held hands and walked toward a new life together.

== Cast ==
=== Main ===
- Leon Jay Williams as Chen Mingyu
- Huang Shengyi as Xia Wei

=== Supporting ===
- Yang Zi as Chen Jinyu
- Li Chenxi as Shi Cuihua
- Sang Yehong
- Liao Xueqiu
- Li Qi as Hou Xingfu
- Wang Chun as Pan Mei
- Yang Yang as Hong Yu

== See also ==
- List of Sohu original programming
