= List of Sohu original programming =

Sohu is a Chinese streaming website. Sohu started its own programs in 2011. Its first show was a short form comedy called Qian Duoduo Gets Married, which led to huge success and to the production of several other successful short form comedy shows, including Diors Man and Wonder Lady.

== Original programming ==
=== Drama ===
Number of original drama shows: 39

Title	Genre	Premiere	Seasons	Length	Status
Qian Duoduo Gets Married	Drama	February 14, 2011	22 episodes	12 - 14 min.	Ended
Le Junkai	Romance	August 13, 2013	10 episodes	14–16 min.	Miniseries
Never Give Up Dodo	Romance	October 22, 2013	1 season, 10 episodes	21–35 min.	Ended
Back in Time	Romance	August 4, 2014	1 season, 16 episodes	40–50 min.	Ended
Wuxin: The Monster Killer	Fantasy drama	July 6, 2015	2 seasons, 47 episodes	40–50 min.	Ended
Love Me, If You Dare	Drama	October 15, 2015	1 seasons, 24 episodes	43 min.	Ended
High End Crush	Romance/Korean	November 14, 2015	1 season, 22 episodes	15–17 min.	Ended
ACG Hero	Fantasy	December 9, 2015	2 seasons, 20 episodes	10–11 min.	Ended
Painting Heart Expert	Fantasy drama	December 16, 2015	1 season, 20 episodes	36–38 min.	Ended
Shi Ling Lu	Fantasy	February 25, 2016	1 season, 27 episodes	30–50 min.	Ended
Thumping Spike	Korean drama	February 20, 2016	2 seasons, 40 episodes	15–20 min.	Ended
Campus Beauty	Romance/fantasy	June 25, 2016	2 seasons, 40 episodes	36–50 min.	Ended
Gogh, The Starry Night	Comedy/drama	July 2, 2016	1 season, 20 episodes	18–19 min.	Ended
My Little Princess	Romance	August 11, 2016	1 season, 20 episodes	40–50 min.	Ended
Men with Sword	Fantasy drama	August 14, 2016	2 seasons, 60 episodes	30–40 min.	Ended
Big Man Sunday	Fantasy	September 20, 2016	1 season, 22 episodes	20–30 min.	Ended
Medical Examiner Dr. Qin	Crime drama	October 13, 2016	2 seasons, 40 episodes	33 - 42 min.	Moved to Tencent Video
Weapon & Soul	Fantasy drama	November 16, 2016	2 seasons, 32 episodes	35–45 min.	Ended
Fox in the Screen	Fantasy	November 21, 2016	1 season, 10 episodes	26–36 min.	Ended
Who Sent the Love Letter?	Drama	March 9, 2017	12 episodes	30–40 min.	Miniseries
Young Ji Gong	Fantasy drama	March 14, 2017	2 seasons, 60 episodes	30–40 min.	Ended
Find Attic Story	Fantasy drama	March 22, 2017	1 season, 12 episodes	29–31 min.	Ended
The Hypnotist	Drama	April 13, 2017	1 season, 19 episodes	33–36 min.	Ended
Miracle Healer	Fantasy	May 23, 2017	2 season, 40 episodes	39–50 min.	Ended
The Gardenias Blossom	Romance	June 21, 2017	1 season, 13 episodes	26–33 min.	Miniseries
Abnormal Events Anthology	Suspense/scary	June 23, 2017	2 seasons, 20 episodes	48–65 min.	Ended
Dear Prince	Romantic drama	August 30, 2017	1 seasons, 19 episodes	30–50 min.	Ended
Your Highness	Drama/Game	November 9, 2017	2 seasons, 43 episodes	40 min.	Pending
I Cannot Hug You	Romantic drama	November 20, 2017	2 seasons, 32 episodes	30 min.	Pending
Die Now	Sci-fi	December 6, 2017	1 season, 21 episodes	30–40 min.	Ended
The Big Bug	Drama	January 25, 2018	1 season, 24 episodes	28–35 min.	Ended
Tree in the River	Romantic drama	March 29, 2018	1 season, 20 episodes	32–40 min.	Ended
It's Just Breakup	Suspense/short/comedy	May 1, 2018	2 season, 21 episodes	4 –10 min.	Pending
The Story of Souls from Endless Books	Fantasy	July 10, 2018	1 season, 20 episodes	27–40 min.	Renewed for final season
The Untold Story of Tang Dynasty	Drama	August 30, 2018	1 season, 20 episodes	40–50 min.	Ended
Visible Lie	Crime drama	November 22, 2018	1 season, 18 episodes	30–32 min.	Ended
Chong Mingwei：Da Ming Secret	Drama	December 11, 2018	1 season, 24 episodes	24–26 min.	Ended
Well Intended Love	Romantic drama	January 17, 2019	1 season, 20 episodes	40 min.	Renewed
The Next Top Star	Drama	July 4, 2019	1 season, 15 episodes	27–40 min.	Ended
The Enticement	Drama	July 28, 2022	1 season, 34 episodes	45 min.	Ongoing

=== Comedy ===
Number of original comedy shows: 12

Title	Genre	Premiere	Seasons	Length	Status
Crazy Dream Office	Comedy	April 7, 2011	1 season, 10 episodes	14–20 min.	Ended
Diors Man	Comedy	October 10, 2012	4 seasons, 29 episodes	7–16 min.	Ended
Bad Student	Sitcom	December 23, 2012	1 season, 6 episodes	12 min.	Ended
Wonder Lady	Comedy	May 6, 2013	4 seasons, 28 episodes	10–20 min.	Ended
Shui Hu Academy	Comedy	July 2, 2014	1 season, 8 episodes	24–36 min.	Ended
What If	Comedy	July 29, 2015	1 season, 10 episodes	11 min.	Ended
Mr. Hahaha	Sitcom	May 11, 2016	1 season, 11 episodes	10–15 min.	Ended
What If	Comedy	July 12, 2016	12 episodes	13–15 min.	Miniseries
Gold Female Bodyguards	Comedy	February 13, 2017	1 season, 12 episodes	20–30 min.	Ended
Big Forest Cafe	Comedy	March 31, 2017	1 season, 24 episodes	20–30 min.	Ended
A Man Called Huang Guosheng	Kongfu	December 26, 2017	1 season, 3 episodes	15 min.	Ended
Haha Gym	Comedy	April 25, 2019	1 season, 12 episodes	20–30 min.	Ended

=== Reality ===
Title	Genre	Premiere	Seasons	Length	Status
Take 100 Girls Back Home	Reality	March 27, 2018	3 seasons	20–40 min.	Pending

=== Co-productions ===
Title	Genre	Co-network	Premiere	Seasons	Length	Status
Falling down	Science fiction	PPTV	March 16, 2015	2 seasons, 60 episodes	20–40 min.	Pending
The Sound of Your Heart	Comedy/Korean	Naver	November 7, 2016	1 season, 10 episodes	10–20 min.	Ended
