= Huang Shengyi =

Chinese actress and singer (born 1983)

- 黄圣依
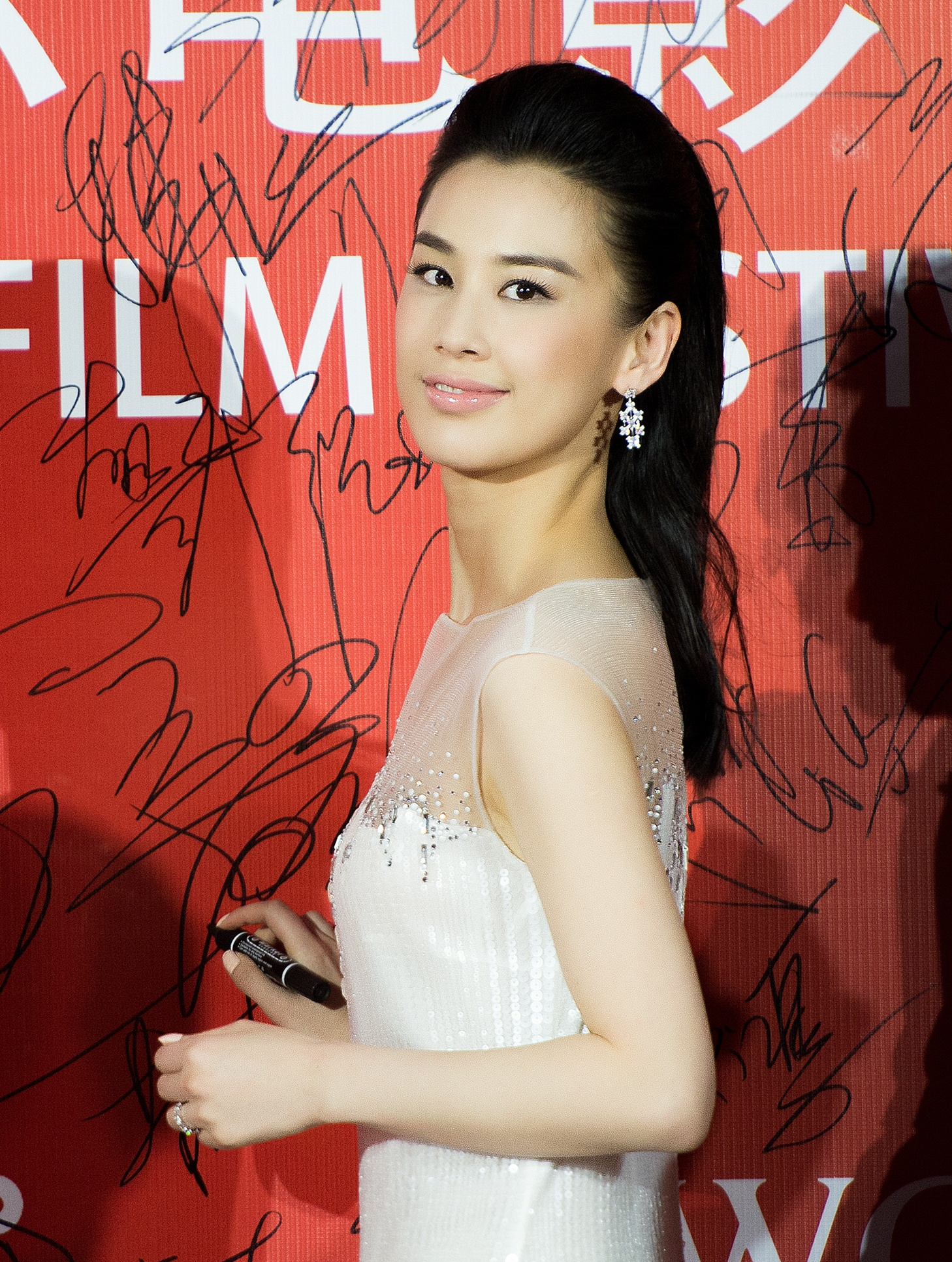
- Huang in 2014
- Born: Huang Shengyi; February 11, 1983 (age 43); Shanghai, China
- Other name: Eva Huang
- Education: Beijing Film Academy
- Occupations: Actress; singer
- Years active: 2002–present
- Agent(s): Julishengyi Media Co., Ltd
- Spouse: Yang Zi (楊子) (m. 2007; div. 2025)
- Children: 2
- Musical career
- Genre: Mandopop

Chinese name
- Simplified Chinese: 黄圣依
- Traditional Chinese: 黃聖依
Transcriptions
Standard Mandarin
- Hanyu Pinyin: Huáng Shèngyī
Yue: Cantonese
- Jyutping: Wong4 Sing3-ji1

Huang Shengyi (Chinese: 黄圣依, born February 11, 1983), also known as Eva Huang, is a Chinese actress and singer.

== Early life and education ==
Huang was born and raised in Shanghai. Her father was educated in the United States and lived there in the early 1990s, while her mother worked as an editor in a newspaper agency in Shanghai. She graduated from the Beijing Film Academy in 2001.

== Career ==
Huang rose to fame after starring in Stephen Chow's action comedy film Kung Fu Hustle (2004). Kung Fu Hustle took a record 155 million yuan at box offices across the mainland China, making it China's top-grossing film in 2004. In August the following year, she ended her contract with Chow's company after appearing in a magazine photo shoot without their consent. Huang then starred in Dragon Squad (2005), which received critical acclaim and was among the first films to be listed in the permanent collection by the National Museum of China.

Starting in 2006, Huang worked with China Juli Group on a number of television series, including Fairy Couple (2007) and The Shadow of Empress Wu (2007). Fairy Couple was the highest rated drama of the year, and led to increased recognition for Huang. She also starred in the television adaptation of Louis Cha's novel Sword Stained with Royal Blood. In 2008, Huang released her first solo album, titled Huang Shengyi. In 2009, Huang became the CEO of China Juli Group's Entertainment Media Co., Ltd, drawing a six-figure salary annually. The same year, she appeared in a minor role in the Hollywood science fiction film Race to Witch Mountain.

In 2011, Huang starred alongside Jet Li and Raymond Lam in The Sorcerer and the White Snake where she played the White Snake Demon. She then starred in The Locked Door (2012), a film which tells about the life story of a girl from noble family, who was raped at young age. The film won the Best Feature at the Monaco Charity Film Festival. In 2013, Huang starred in the romance drama Marriage Rules. This is the first production created by Huang's own studio, and it was a commercial and ratings success. In 2014, Huang starred alongside Donnie Yen in the action comedy film Iceman, which won her the Best Actress award at the Huading Awards for her performance. In 2015, Huang was cast in the war epic film Air Strike.

== Personal life ==
Huang's relationship with businessman and former actor Yang Zi has been a topic of speculation, with various rumors ranging from them being lovers to business partners. Their conflicting public statements have fueled suspicions of media manipulation. In 2006, Huang was spotted at Yang's film set, sparking dating rumors, which they later denied. In 2007, they got married.

At the end of 2024, Huang and Yang appeared on the reality show See You Again 4, sparking speculation about their personal lives. Some of the couple's business ventures have also attracted negative media coverage. Then, in early 2025, the two announced their divorce.

== Filmography ==
=== Film ===
Year	English title	Chinese title	Role	Notes
2004	Kung Fu Hustle	功夫	Fong	
2005	Heaven's Eyes	天堂的眼睛	Bai Xue	
2005	Dragon Squad	猛龙	Pak Yut-suet	
2006	Lethal Ninja	战神再现	Xiaoling	
2006	Flying Sword	飞刀	Xiao Yu	Not released
2007	Call for Love	爱情呼叫转移	Long Xiaoxia	
2009	Race to Witch Mountain	超异能冒险	Shira the UFO Huntress	
2009	The Founding of a Republic	建国大业	Broadcaster from Xinhua News Agency	
2010	A Singing Fairy	寻找刘三姐	Liu Tiantian	
2010	The Fantastic Water Babes	出水芙蓉	Ayu	
2010	Piratic Love	盗版爱情	Lajiaomei	
2011	The Man Behind the Courtyard House	守望者：罪恶迷途	Chu Xiaoli	
2011	The Sorcerer and the White Snake	白蛇传说	White Snake	
2012	The Locked Door	女人如花	Yan Wen	
2012	One Night to be Star	一夜成名	Sui Xiaofei	
2013	The Palace	宮鎖沉香	Concubine Wen	
2013	High Kickers	舍身技	Ling Ling	
2014	On the Way	我在路上最愛你	Cui Shuijing	
2014	Iceman	3D冰封俠	Xiao Mei	
2014	Nature Law	拆散專家	Mi Lan	
2016	Two Idiots	奇葩追夢	Mi Yimei	
2018	Air Strike	大轰炸	Lin Shuyuan	
2018	Iceman 2: The Frozen Hero	时空行者	May	
TBA	Idiots	活宝	Zhu Xiaohuai	
TBA	Defiance	代号·反抗	Xiao Xi	
TBA	Peacocking	狐踪谍影	Fei Xing	

=== Television series ===
Year	English title	Chinese title	Role	Notes
2003	The House of Apple	红苹果乐园	Jiang Lingda	
2005	The Royal Swordsmen	天下第一	Liusheng Xueji	
2005	Hail the Judge	新九品芝麻官	Zhan Suifeng	
2006	Kung Fu Beggar	功夫状元	Wen Qi / Jin Sha	
2006	Golden Age	金色年华	Ai Wanqing	
2007	Sword Stained with Royal Blood	碧血剑	Xia Qingqing / Wen Qingqing	
2007		家和万事兴之抬头见喜	Cui Xiyue	
2007		丁家有女喜洋洋	Ding Xun	
2007	Song Bird	天涯歌女	Wan Renmei	
2007	Fairy Couple	天仙配	Seventh Fairy	
2008		凭什么爱你	Keke	
2008	The Foolish Old Man Removed Mountains	愚公移山	Baihe	
2008	The Shadow of Empress Wu	日月凌空	Xie Yaohuan	
2009	Girl Rushes Forward	女孩冲冲冲	Lin Wumei	
2010	Endless Love in Tokyo	东京生死恋	Lankouzi	
2010		广府太极传奇	Yang Yuying	
2011	Melody of Youth	青春旋律	Tian Tian	
2011		下南洋	Tao Shuyan	
2011	Revered Hero Fang Shiyu	蓋世英雄方世玉	Lei Wushuang	
2013	The Marriage Rules	第22婚规	Lee Yuetong	
2013	No Promise of Love	没有承诺的爱	Lin Minna	
2015	Love You Thousands of Silk	爱你，万缕千丝	Tong Zhiyuan	
2015	I Will Wait for You in Xilingol	我在錫林郭勒等你	Han Xiao	
2016	The Marriage Rules 2	第22婚规2	Lee Yuetong	
2018	The Enticement	天珠的诱惑	Xia Wei	
2019	Fortress Besieged	热爱	An Xin	
2020	Winter Begonia	鬓边不是海棠红	Gu Dali	
2022	The Enticement	诱惑	Xia Wei	
TBA	Young Emperor Kangxi	少帝康熙	Empress Xiaoyiren	
TBA	Sui Sui Qing Lian	岁岁青莲		

=== Variety show ===
Year	English title	Chinese title	Role	Notes
2020	Sisters Who Make Waves	乘风破浪的姐姐	Cast member	

== Discography ==
=== Albums ===
Year	English title	Chinese title
2007	Tattoo of Love	爱的纹身
2008	Huang Shengyi	黄圣依同名专辑
2009	Love in Heart	心中有爱
2009	Choosing Love Everyday	选美everyday
2013	Facing Love	

=== Singles ===
Year	English title	Chinese title	Album	Notes
2004	"Only Want to Live a Day for You	只要为你活一天	Kung Fu Hustle OST	
2004	"I Won't Live for You"	我不入地狱	Kung Fu Hustle OST	
2006	"The One I Love Most"	最爱的人	The One I Love Most	with Wang Ziming
2006	"Not Allowed to Make Me Angry"	不许惹我生气	—N/a	
2009	"Dream of Liu Sanjie"	绿色行动令	A Singing Fairy OST	with Alec Su
2009	"Happiness is Energy"	快乐是能量	Dalian Discovery Kingdom OST	
2011	"Promise"	许诺	The Sorcerer and the White Snake OST	with Raymond Lam
2012	"Moonlight Person"	月亮人	The Locked Door OST	
2014	"Three Days & Three Night"	三天三夜	On the Way OST	

== Awards ==
Year	Award	Category	Nominated work	Ref.
2008	12th Golden Phoenix Awards	Newcomer Award	Heaven's Eyes	
2015	15th Huading Awards	Best Actress	Iceman	
