= Iceman (2014 film) =

2014 Hong Kong-Chinese film by Law Wing-cheung

- Poster
- Traditional Chinese: 冰封俠: 重生之門
- Simplified Chinese: 冰封俠: 重生之门
- Literal meaning: Iceman Hero: Gate of Rebirth
- Hanyu Pinyin: Bīng Fēng : Chóng Shēng Zhī Mén
- Jyutping: Bing1 Fung1 Hap6: Cung4 Sang1 Zi1 Mun4
- Directed by: Law Wing-cheung
- Screenplay by: Mark Wu; Lam Fung; Shum Shek-yin
- Based on: The Iceman Cometh by Clarence Fok
- Produced by: Huang Jianxin; Allen Chan; Donnie Yen
- Starring: Donnie Yen; Wang Baoqiang; Eva Huang; Simon Yam; Yu Kang; Lam Suet; Kelly Fu
- Cinematography: Kenny Tse; Edmond Fung
- Edited by: David Richardson; Matthew Hui
- Music by: Christof Unterberger; Raymond Wong; Wendy Zheng
- Production companies: China 3D Digital Entertainment; Beijing ShengShi HuaRei Film Investment & Management Co. Zhongmeng Century Media
- Distributed by: Well Go USA Entertainment; Blue Swan Entertainment; Pegasus Motion Pictures; Shaw Organisation; Joyncontents Group; Netflix; New KSM
- Release date: April 25, 2014
- Running time: 104 minutes (Hong Kong); 91 minutes (China)
- Countries: Hong Kong; China
- Languages: Cantonese; Mandarin; Hindi; English; Japanese
- Budget: HK$250 million (US$32.2 million)
- Box office: US$26 million

Iceman is a 2014 3D martial arts action-comedy film directed by Law Wing-cheung and starring Donnie Yen, who also serves as the film's action director. A Hong Kong-Chinese co-production, the film is a remake of the 1989 film The Iceman Cometh which was directed by Clarence Fok and starred Yuen Biao. The film was released in Hong Kong and China on April 25, 2014. A sequel titled Iceman: The Time Traveler was released in 2018.

== Plot ==
A Ming Dynasty officer, He Ying, was tasked with bringing a mythical time traveling device from India with a LINGA back to the Ming emperor. He was betrayed, and subsequently frozen. He Ying, Sao and Niehu were frozen during a fight. They were discovered and put in cryo-stasis pods and transferred to modern-day Hong Kong. During transit, an accident sets them free. The three escape into the city. Niehu and Sao are set on exacting revenge on He Ying, despite not understanding the world they are in. He Ying soon befriends May, who takes advantage of his confusion about the modern world by charging him exorbitant amount of money for rent, food, and so on. Niehu and Sao unknowingly help two Indian mobsters escape the police, and as a result join the Indian mob.

It is revealed that Cheung is looking for the trio, in particular He Ying. Through various flashbacks, it is revealed that all four were blood brothers who fought side by side, before He Ying was betrayed and charged with treason. After several encounters in the modern world including meeting May's mother, fleeing custody of the police (using his master martial arts skills), and the use of technology, He Ying starts to figure out who is ultimately hunting down Cheung.

== Cast ==
- Donnie Yen as He Ying
- Wang Baoqiang as Sao
- Eva Huang as May
- Simon Yam as Cheung
- Yu Kang as Niehu
- Lam Suet as Tang
- Zhang Shaohua as He Ying's mother
- Benny Chan as Celebrity
- Hu Ming as Eunuch
- Gregory Wong as Officer Szeto
- Jaqueline Chong as Jacqueline
- Mark Wu as Slander
- Ava Yu as Ava
- Alice Chan as Director of retirement home
- Lo Hoi-pang as Pang
- Wong Man-wai as May's mother
- Chen Huihui as Mimi
- Bao Yumeng as Kid
- Kelly Fu as Female officer
- Fun Lo as Female doctor
- Tin Kai-man as Male doctor
- Jeana Ho as a prostitute speaking Japanese (cameo)

== Production ==
Filming for Iceman began on December 19, 2012 in Hong Kong. Originally produced at a budget of HK$100 million, the production soared up to Hong Kong $200 million due to its slow-paced filming and to cover the film crew's insurance. Because the Hong Kong government did not approve the film to shoot at the Tsing Ma Bridge, an addition of Hong Kong $50 million was spent in order to build an imitation set of the Tsing Ma Bridge. Lead actor and action director Donnie Yen said that a seven-minute fight scene took ten days to shoot. Besides Hong Kong, a chunk of the film would also be filmed in Beijing. For a car chase scene, actor Julian Cheung also loaned his black Lamborghini to the production.

Filming locations include Hong Kong's defunct Kai Tak Airport and the Changbai Mountains.

== Music ==
Jam Hsiao was handpicked by Donnie Yen for the Mandarin theme song. The Cantonese version was performed by Hong Kong singer and actor Julian Cheung.

== Reception ==
The Hollywood Reporter writes "Plagued by all manner of production snafus and a ballooning budget, the problems show in the final product. Iceman is a fractured and often baffling martial 'epic' that not even popular star Donnie Yen is likely to be able to save." Screendaily writes the film is "beset by multiple problems, from a patchy incoherent script, to jarring shifts in tone and genre, and sub-par action and effects sequences that even the star presence of Donnie Yen may find hard to reconcile." Donnie Yen's performance won him the Golden Broom Award for Worst Actor.

== See also ==
- Donnie Yen filmography
