= Leon Jay Williams =

Singaporean actor and singer (born 1976)

- Born: 30 July 1976 (age 49); Singapore
- Occupations: Actor, singer, model
- Agent(s): ECI Global Talent Management; Mediacorp’s The Celebrity Agency (TCA) (2022-present)
- Spouse: Joyce Li (m. 2014)
- Children: 1

Chinese name
- Simplified Chinese: 立威廉
Transcriptions
Standard Mandarin
- Hanyu Pinyin: Lì Wēi Lián
- Website: Official website

Leon Jay Williams (Chinese: 立威廉; pinyin: Li Wei Lian, born 30 July 1976), also known as Li Wei-lian, is a Singaporean actor, singer and model who also frequently works in Taiwan and mainland China. In addition to Mandarin Chinese, he speaks English; he sometimes displays this ability in his work on television shows. He was a former model.

== Acting career ==
He is known for starring in several Taiwanese dramas, including Green Forest, My Home and Heaven's Wedding Gown. He has also made a cameo appearance in Smiling Pasta. His most recent drama appearance is in "Zhang Xiao Wu's Spring". Williams was also a former Mister Singapore and Mister International Man. He used to sign to ECI Global Talent Management.

Since 2022, he signed with Mediacorp's The Celebrity Agency after relocating back to Singapore.

== Personal life ==
Williams is of mixed English, German, Japanese and Chinese descent: his paternal grandfather is English, while his paternal grandmother is of mixed German and Japanese ancestry. His mother is a Chinese Singaporean.

Williams married in 2014 to Joyce, a Taiwanese, and they have a daughter in 2015.

== Discography ==
=== Albums ===
- Sweet Inspirations: Leon Jay Williams - 2005
- Leon has released his first album – ‘Sweet Inspirations’, compiling of English songs from the 60s and 70s. He sang one of the tracks – Can't Smile Without You, and made an MV for another track – And I Love You So.
- Green Green Forest My Home OST : Forever - 2006
- Upcoming EP with Beijing Olympic Water Cube Team Song - Love Flows (Mandarin Version) and Friends (Korea Version) duet with Han Ji Hye. Expected to be released end 2008.

== Filmography ==
- Triple Nine S3 Ep 6 (Singapore English Drama) (1998) (Cameo)
- A War Diary (Singapore English Drama) (2001)
- La Robe De Mariee Des Cieux 《天国的嫁衣》 (2004)
- Green Forest, My Home 《绿光森林》 (2005)
- Fly with Me 《想飞》 (China Production) (2007)
- My Lucky Star 《放羊的星星》 (2007)
- Imperfect 《十全九美》 (China Production) (2008)
- Jump 《跳出去》 (Hong Kong Production) (2009)
- Gangster Rock (2010)
- The Love River 《藍海1加1》(2010)
- Zhang Xiaowu's Spring 《張小五的春天》(2010)
- My Sassy Girl 2 (2010)
- Death Zone (2012)
- Lemon (2013)
- Timeless Love (2013)
- Turn Around (2014)
- Who Moved My Dream (2014)
- Doomed Disaster (2015)
- For Love (2016)
- Lulu the Movie (2016)
- What a Wonderful Life 《赛小花的远大前程》 (2017)
- Ice Cream Lover 《冷恋时代》 (2018)
- The Thieves 《夺宝大师》 (2021)
- The Enticement 《诱惑》 (China Production) (2022)
