= Sword of Blood and Valour =

1958 Hong Kong film by Lee Sun-fung

- 碧血劍
- Directed by: Lee Sun-fung
- Screenplay by: Lee Sun-fung
- Based on: Sword Stained with Royal Blood by Jin Yong
- Produced by: Wen Wu
- Starring: Cho Tat-wah; Sheung-koon Kwan-wai; Chan Tsui-ping; Tsi Law-Lin
- Cinematography: Shen Min-hui
- Edited by: Chong Mun-long
- Production company: Emei Film Company
- Release dates: 3 December 1958 (Part 1); 1 July 1959 (Part 2)
- Running time: 94 minutes
- Country: Hong Kong
- Language: Cantonese

Sword of Blood and Valour (碧血劍) is a two-part Hong Kong wuxia film adapted from the novel Sword Stained with Royal Blood by Jin Yong. Directed by Lee Sun-fung and produced by the Emei Film Company, starring Cho Tat-wah, Sheung-koon Kwan-wai, Chan Tsui-ping, and Tsi Law-Lin. The first part was released on 3 December 1958 while the second was released on 1 July 1959.

== Cast ==
- Cho Tat-wah as Yuan Chengzhi
  - Shek Sau as Yuan Chengzhi (younger)
- Sheung-koon Kwan-wai as Xia Qingqing
- Chan Tsui-ping as Ajiu
- Tsi Law-Lin as Ajiu (part 1) / Jiao Wan'er (part 2)
- Ng Cho-fan as Xia Xueyi
- Law Yim-hing as Wen Yi
- Shih Kien as Wen Mingshan (part 1) / Min Zihua (part 2)
- Ng Yan-chi as Wen Mingyi (part 1) / Mei Jianhe (part 2)
- Chow Siu-loi as Wen Mingshi
- Chan Yiu-lam as Wen Mingwu
- Siu Hon-sang as Wen Mingda
- Ho San as Wen Zheng (part 1) / Huang Tie (part 2)
- Lee Yuet-ching as Wen Liushen (part 1) / Jiao Gongli's wife (part 2)
- Chan Ho-Kau as An Xiaohui
  - Wong Oi-ming as An Xiaohui (younger)
- Chan Wai-yu as An Daniang (part 1) / Sun Zhongjun (part 2)
- Ling Mung as Taoist Musong
- Yeung Yip-wang as Mu Renqing
- Yuen Siu-tien as the mute
- Ko Chiu as Rong Cai
- Ko Lo-chuen as Long Delin
- Lee Ching as Jiao Gongli
- Mak Sin-shing as Wu Ping
- Yeung Fan as Luo Liru
- Wong Chor-san as Cheng Qingzhu
