= The Shadow of Empress Wu =

- DVD cover art
- 日月凌空
- Genre: Historical drama
- Written by: Wu Yinyi
- Directed by: Lu Qi
- Starring: Liu Xiaoqing; Eva Huang; Vincent Jiao; Ma Xiaowei; Yang Zi
- Opening theme: "The Sun and Moon High in the Sky" (日月凌空) by Yao Beina
- Ending theme: "I am the Sun and Moon for a Moment" (我是日月一瞬间) by Liu Xiaohuan
- Country of origin: China
- Original language: Mandarin
- No. of episodes: 62

Production
- Producers: Jing Jun; Zhao Zhiping
- Production location: China
- Cinematography: Ye Zhiwei; Yu Changjiang; Li Xue
- Running time: ≈45 minutes per episode
- Production company: Nanjing Film Studio

Original release
- Network: CCTV
- Release: 5 August 2007 – 15 January 2008

The Shadow of Empress Wu (日月凌空) is a Chinese historical television series about the relationship between Wu Zetian, the only female emperor in Chinese history, and Xie Yaohuan, a fictional female official serving in Wu Zetian's court. The series was directed by Lu Qi and starred Liu Xiaoqing, Eva Huang, Vincent Jiao, Ma Xiaowei and Yang Zi. It was first broadcast on CCTV from August 2007 to January 2008 in mainland China, and in November 2008 on HD Jade in Hong Kong.

== Cast ==
- Liu Xiaoqing as Wu Zetian
- Eva Huang as Xie Yaohuan
- Vincent Chiao as Helan Minzhi
- Ma Xiaowei as Li Zhi (Emperor Gaozong)
- Yang Zi as Luo Binwang
- Li Zonghan as Qiao Zhizhi
- Zou Yuanlong as Li Hong
- Xu Shengnan as Li Xian
- Xu Baihui as Yang Meiyun
- Wen Qing as Xie Yaowei
- Li Xinyi as Shangguan Zhengshu
- Shi Daimei as Sai Hong Fu
- Ma Si'er as Yang Fa
- Zhang Shuyu as Helan Minyue
- Long Yiyi as Wu Tuan'er
- Li Daojun as Xie Ao
- Liu Weiming as Wu Sansi
- Yu Le as Wu Yizong
- Liu Wenzhi as Shangguan Yi
- Yuan Man as Shangguan Tingzhi
- Luo Weilun as Ming Chongyan
- Cheng Lisha as Lady Wei
- Yan Feng as Zheng Yang
- Li Tong as Zheng Shu
- Fuyu Xingzi as Zheng Lan
- Hou Yongsheng as Li Ji
- Shen Lei as Li Jingye
- Xie Li as Xian Kelai
- Rao Jiexiang as Jingwei
- Jiang Feng as Chen Zi'ang
- Shun Haibin as Xue Huaiyi
- Guo Jinghua as Xu Jingzong
- Liu Xiangjing as Di Renjie
- Zhao Shoukai as Pei Yan
- Zhong Chao as Zhou Xing
- Zhang Xin as Lai Junchen
- Li Hanjun as Li Zhuan
- Guo Hongbo as Li Cheng
- Chen Chen as Wang Fuling
- Ma Yun as Wang Fusheng
- Guan Xiaotong as Huajie Nana

== See also ==
- Da Tang Nü Xun An
