= Sword Stained with Royal Blood =

1956 wuxia novel by Jin Yong

- Volume 5 of one of the earliest editions of Sword Stained with Royal Blood.
- Author: Jin Yong
- Original title: 碧血劍
- Language: Chinese
- Genre: Wuxia
- Publisher: Hong Kong Commercial Daily
- Publication date: 1 January 1956
- Publication place: Hong Kong
- Media type: Print
- ISBN: 9789573260387
- Preceded by: The Smiling, Proud Wanderer
- Followed by: The Deer and the Cauldron

Sword Stained with Royal Blood
- Traditional Chinese: 碧血劍
- Simplified Chinese: 碧血剑
Transcriptions
Standard Mandarin
- Hanyu Pinyin: Bì Xuě Jiàn
Yue: Cantonese
- Jyutping: Bik^{1} Hyut^{3} Gim^{3}

Sword Stained with Royal Blood (碧血劍) is a wuxia novel by Jin Yong (Louis Cha). It was first serialised in the Hong Kong newspaper Hong Kong Commercial Daily between 1 January 1956 and 31 December 1956. Since its first publication, the novel has undergone two revisions, with the latest edition being the third. Some characters from the novel play minor roles or are simply mentioned by name in The Deer and the Cauldron, another of Jin Yong's novels.

== Plot summary ==
The novel is set in 17th-century China when the Ming dynasty is collapsing due to political corruption and a rebellion led by Li Zicheng, while at the same time facing the threat posed by the Manchus in the northeast.

The Ming general Yuan Chonghuan is wrongly accused of treason and executed by the Chongzhen Emperor. His son, Yuan Chengzhi, is saved by his loyal followers and sent to the Mount Hua, where the boy is trained in swordsmanship by Mu Renqing, the legendary leader of the Mount Hua Sect. Years later, a grown-up Yuan ventures into the jianghu and serendipitously discovers the Golden Serpent Sword and a martial arts manual which once belonged to Xia Xueyi, a long-dead enigmatic swordsman. Yuan inherits the sword and masters the skills in the manual, becoming a more powerful swordsman.

By chance, Yuan meets Wen Qingqing, Xia Xueyi's daughter, who accompanies him on his adventures after being expelled by her maternal family. Although Yuan initially seeks redress for his father, he ultimately joins Li Zicheng's rebels to overthrow the corrupt Ming government. He helps the rebels retrieve the gold stolen by the Wen family, sabotages a battery of cannons supplied to Ming forces by foreigners, and finances the rebellion with the treasure he found in Nanjing. During this time, he reconnects with his father's followers and befriends several prominent jianghu figures, eventually organising them into a militia to serve and protect the Han Chinese nation.

Although Yuan's initial focus was on the rebellion, he realises that the Later Jin dynasty poses an even greater threat to the Han Chinese nation. He infiltrates Mukden and attempts to assassinate the Manchu ruler Huangtaiji but fails and narrowly escapes. Later, despite holding a grudge against the Chongzhen Emperor for his father's death, he saves the emperor from a palace coup staged by a treacherous prince. At the same time, he meets He Tieshou, the leader of the evil Five Poisons Cult, and manages to reform her and take her as his apprentice. He also gets entangled in a love triangle with Wen Qingqing and Ajiu, who is actually the Chongzhen Emperor's daughter.

Yuan ultimately regrets his decision to support the rebels because the interim government they set up to replace the Ming government turns out to be as corrupt as its predecessor. Meanwhile, Wu Sangui, the Ming general guarding Shanhai Pass, defects to the Manchus, allowing the Manchus to eventually conquer the rest of China and establish the Qing dynasty. Yuan realises that he cannot do anything to reverse the situation, so he decides to leave China with his companions and settle down in a distant land.

== Adaptations ==
=== Films ===
Year	Production	Main cast	Additional information
1958 / 1959	Emei Film Company (Hong Kong)	Cho Tat-wah, Sheung-koon Kwan-wai, Chan Tsui-ping, Tsi Law-lin, Ng Cho-fan	See Sword of Blood and Valour
1982	Shaw Brothers Studio (Hong Kong)	Philip Kwok, Chiang Sheng, Wen Hsueh-erh, Lung Tien-hsiang	See Sword Stained with Royal Blood
1993	Hong Kong	Yuen Biao, Yip Chuen-chan, Sharla Cheung, Danny Lee, Anita Yuen	See The Sword Stained with Royal Blood

=== Television series ===
Year	Production	Main cast	Additional information
1977	CTV (Hong Kong)	Chan Keung, Wen Hsueh-erh, Lee Tong-ming, Shek Tin, Wu Yan-yan, Yuen Chau	See Sword Stained with Royal Blood (1977 TV series)
1985	TVB (Hong Kong)	Felix Wong, Chong Ching-yee, Teresa Mo, Michael Miu, Regina Tsang, Rebecca Chan	See Sword Stained with Royal Blood (1985 TV series)
2000	TVB (Hong Kong)	Gordon Lam, Sarah Au, Charmaine Sheh, Kwong Wa, Melissa Ng, Fiona Yuen	See Crimson Sabre
2007	Mainland China	Bobby Dou, Eva Huang, Sun Feifei, Hsiao Shu-shen, Vincent Chiao	See Sword Stained with Royal Blood (2007 TV series)

=== Video games ===
- He Tieshou was a playable character in the 2008 fighting game Street Fighter Online: Mouse Generation.
