= Lemon (2013 film) =

- Directed by: Jiarui Zhang
- Starring: Hong So-hee; Leon Jay Williams
- Release date: April 19, 2013 (China)
- Running time: 100 minutes
- Country: China
- Language: Mandarin
- Box office: US$0.2 million

Lemon (Chinese: 柠檬) is a 2013 Chinese romantic comedy film directed by Jiarui Zhang.

== Cast ==
- Hong So-hee
- Leon Jay Williams
