= Yang Zongbao =

- Generals of the Yang Family character
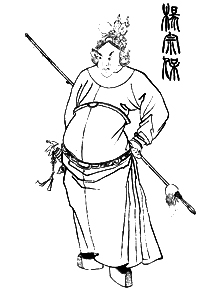
- from one 1892 print of the novel Biographies of Generals of the Yang Family (楊家將傳)

In-universe information
- Spouse: Mu Guiying
- Children: Yang Wenguang, son Yang Jinhua (楊金花), daughter Yang Chuanyong (楊傳永), son Yang Dezheng (楊德政), son
- Father: Yang Yanzhao
- Mother: Princess Chai (柴郡主)

Yang Zongbao
- Traditional Chinese: 楊宗保
- Simplified Chinese: 杨宗保
Transcriptions
Standard Mandarin
- Hanyu Pinyin: Yáng Zōngbǎo
- Wade–Giles: Yang^{2} Tsung^{1}-pao^{3}
Yue: Cantonese
- Yale Romanization: Yeung^{4} Jung^{1}-bou^{2}
- Jyutping: Joeng^{4} Zung^{1}-bou^{2}

Yang Zongbao (楊宗保) is a character in the Generals of the Yang Family legends. In these largely fictionalized stories, he is the son of general Yang Yanzhao and Princess Chai, the husband of Mu Guiying and the father of Yang Wenguang.

== Historical Basis ==
According to History of Song, Yang Wenguang was the son rather than the grandson of Yang Yanzhao, and no "Yang Zongbao" was found in either this record or the Records of Longping (隆平集), which mentioned the names of Yang Yanzhao's 2 other sons. However, two surviving genealogy books of the Yangs from Dai County and Yuanping City - both in Shanxi province where the legendary Yang Family originally came from - both recorded Yang Zongbao as one of the three sons of Yang Yanzhao. A "soul-resting" stele discovered in 1985 in Xin'an County, Henan province suggest that a "Yang Zongbao" was indeed a grandchild of Yang Ye's - except a granddaughter rather than a grandson. (Chinese historical records and genealogy books don't usually record names of women.)

== Legends ==
In fiction, Yang Zongbao met his eventual wife Mu Guiying when he was ordered to acquire the Dragon-Taming Wood (降龍木) at the Muke Fortress (穆柯寨) where Mu ruled. He was captured by Mu Guiying but married her when she made a marriage proposal.

He died very young in a battle against Western Xia, where he was shot to death by arrows. After his death, Mu Guiying led the other widows in a western expedition against Western Xia.

== Portrayal in films and TV series ==
- Tsung Hua in The 14 Amazons (1972)
- Norman Chu in The Great General (1979)
- Ha Yu in Young's Female Warrior (1981)
- Su Rongzhou in Generals of the Yang Family (1984)
- Chang Chen-huan in A Courageous Clan: Mu Kuei-ying (1989)
- Xu Chenglin in Generals of the Yang Family (1991)
- Norman Chu in Heroic Legend of the Yang's Family & The Great General (1994)
- Vincent Chiao in The Heroine of the Yangs (1998)
- Ken Chang in Legendary Fighter: Yang's Heroine (2001)
- Lu Shiyu in The Heroine Mu Guiying (2004)
- Richie Jen in Legendary Amazons (2011)
- Luo Jin in Mu Guiying Takes Command (2011)

== More readings ==
- (in Chinese) Toqto'a et al., History of Song, vol. 272 (Yanzhao, son of Yang Ye)
- (in Chinese) Xia Rixin (夏日新) and Yi Xuejin (易学金), Major Historical Cases of China (中国重大文史公案), Wuhan: Changjiang Literature & Art Press, 2003. ISBN 9787535422873
- (in Chinese) Yang Jia Jiang (Generals of the Yang Clan) (C36), Yang Jia Jiang (P542), Yang Jia Jiang (P206), Yang Jia Fu Yan Yi (The Saga of Yang Household)
