= Chalte Chalte =

Chalte Chalte (lit. 'On the Way') may refer to:

- Chalte Chalte (1976 film), a 1976 Indian film directed by Sunder Dar
  - "Chalte Chalte", its title track by Bappi Lahiri and Kishore Kumar
- Chalte Chalte (2003 film), a 2003 Indian film directed by Aziz Mirza
- "Chalte Chalte", a 1972 song written by Kaifi Azmi and sung by Lata Mangeshkar, from the Indian film Pakeezah
- "Chalte Chalte", a 2000 song written by Anand Bakshi, from the Indian film Mohabbatein
- "Chalte Chalte", a 2008 song by Jal

== See also ==
- On the Way (disambiguation)
