= The 14 Amazons =

1972 Hong Kong film by Cheng Kang

- Film poster
- 十四女英豪
- Directed by: Cheng Kang
- Screenplay by: Cheng Gang
- Story by: Ko Yeung
- Produced by: Run Run Shaw
- Starring: Ling Po; Lisa Lu; Lily Ho; Elliot Ngok
- Cinematography: Charles Tung; Chu Chia-hsin; Chang Hsin; Hua Shan; Wong Chit; T. Watanabe; Yau Kei
- Edited by: Chiang Hsing-lung; Fan Kung-ming
- Music by: Wang Fu-ling; Zhou Lan-ping
- Production company: Shaw Brothers Studio
- Distributed by: Shaw Brothers Studio
- Release date: 27 July 1972
- Running time: 123 minutes
- Country: Hong Kong
- Language: Mandarin

The 14 Amazons (十四女英豪) is a 1972 Hong Kong wuxia film directed by Cheng Kang and produced by the Shaw Brothers Studio. The award-winning film featured a predominantly female cast. The story is about the female generals of the Yang Family.

== Overview ==
The film's Chinese title is 十四女英豪. Its alternative title is The Fourteen Amazons. It is also known as Les 14 Amazones in French. The film is a wuxia film set in China during the Song dynasty.

== Synopsis ==
The Yang family, men and women, had served the Song Empire loyally for generations. During the war with Western Xia, Yang Zongbao is ambushed and killed. His death leaves his only son, Yang Wen, as the only male heir left to the Yang family. His widow Mu Guiying, the grand matriarch, and the entire Yang family set out to avenge his death and defend the Song Empire. Due to the interference of a corrupt official, Wang Qing, the Yangs were unable to have the emperor's consent to use the imperial army.

Thus, they set off with whatever volunteer troops they could muster. Knowing of Mu Guiying's reputation as a warrior and tactician, the king of Western Xia and his sons try various ways to stop her to no avail. They are outsmarted at the end as Mu Guiying, the Yang family and their soldiers successfully storm their stronghold.

== Cast ==
- Ling Po as Mu Guiying
- Lily Ho as Yang Wenguang
- Lisa Lu as She Saihua
- Elliot Ngok as Lü Chao
- Chen Yen-yen as Geng Jinhua
- Lin Ching as Zou Lanying
- Hsia Ping as Dong Yue'e
- Betty Ting as Huang Qiongnü
- Huang Chin-feng as Ma Saiying
- Ouyang Sha-fei as Chai Meirong
- Tina Chin Fei as Du Jin'e
- Lee Ching as Yang Yanqi
- Yeh Ling-chih as Yang Yanying
- Wang Ping as Yang Qiuju
- Liu Wu-chih as Yang Qiulan
- Shu Pei-pei as Yang Paifeng
- Ku Wen-tsung as Yang Hong
- Fan Mei-sheng as Jiao Tinggui
- Huang Chun-hsing as Meng Huaiyuan
- Tien Feng as Wang Wen
- Wang Hsieh as Wang Wen's 1st son
- Nam Seok-hun as Wang Wen's 2nd son
- Tien Ching as Wang Wen's 3rd son
- Chin Pei as Wang Wen's 4th son
- Lo Lieh as Wang Wen's 5th son
- Tsung Hua as Yang Zongbao
- Yang Chih-ching as Kou Zhun
- Ching Miao as Wang Qin
- Yang Ai-hua as Pearl
- Ting Chien as Shen Gu
- Eric Tsang as a soldier
- Michelle Yim as a soldier

== Awards ==
- 1973 Best Feature Film - Runner Up. 11th Golden Horse Awards.
- 1973 Cheng Kang won Best Director. 11th Golden Horse Awards.
- 1973 Lisa Lu won Best Supporting Actress. 11th Golden Horse Awards.
- 1973 Wang Yung-hua won Best Sound Effects. 11th Golden Horse Awards.
- 1973 Lily Ho won Outstanding Female Lead Performance. 19th Asian Film Festival.
