= The Escape (1972 film) =

1972 Hong Kong film by Peter Yang and Florence Yu

- Italian film poster
- Directed by: Peter Yang Kwan; Florence Yu Fung Chi
- Written by: Sung Hsiang-ju
- Produced by: Florence Yu Fung Chi
- Starring: Chia Ling; Peter Yang Kwan; Wang Tai Lang; Ma Cheung; Cho Kin
- Cinematography: Hua Hui-ying; Lin Tsan-ting
- Edited by: Sung Ming
- Music by: Chou Fu-liang
- Production company: H.K. Fong Ming Motion Picture Company
- Release dates: 30 November 1972 (Hong Kong); 18 December 1972 (Taiwan)
- Running time: 88 minutes
- Country: Hong Kong
- Language: Mandarin

The Escape is a 1972 Hong Kong action film directed by Peter Yang Kwan. The film stars Kwan alongside Chia Ling, Wang Tai Lang, Ma Cheung and Cho Kin. It was released on 30 November 1972 in Hong Kong, and 18 December 1972 in Taiwan.

== Cast ==
- Chia Ling
- Peter Yang Kwan
- Wang Tai Lang
- Ma Cheung
- Cho Kin
- Sun Jung Chi
- Cheung Kwong Chiu
- Cheung Wan Man
- Lee Hung
- Au Lap Bo
- Tai Leung
- Chan Yau San
- Ko Fei
- Lee Kwai

== Awards ==
The film was awarded the 1973 Golden Horse Award for best picture.
