= Andrew Lin =

Taiwanese actor (born 1969)

Andrew Lin Hoi
- Born: 7 August 1969 (age 56); Taiwan
- Education: California State University, Long Beach
- Occupation: Actor
- Years active: 1996–present

Chinese name
- Traditional Chinese: 連凱
- Simplified Chinese: 连凯
Transcriptions
Standard Mandarin
- Hanyu Pinyin: Lián Kǎi
Yue: Cantonese
- Jyutping: Lin^{4} Hoi^{2}
Southern Min
- Hokkien POJ: Liân Khái
- Musical career
- Also known as: Andrew Lien Kai

Andrew Lin Hoi (Chinese: 連凱; Pe̍h-ōe-jī: Liân Khái) is a Hong Kong–based Taiwanese actor and visual artist. Originally working as a special effects makeup artist in the United States, he went to Hong Kong in 1996 where he started his acting career.

== Filmography ==
=== Films ===
Year	Title	Role	Notes
1996	Kid Vs the Cop (天生絕配)		
1998	God.com (邪教檔案末日風暴)	the Pope	
1998	Woman Soup (女湯)		
1998	The Blacksheep Affair (碧血藍天)	Keizo Mishima	
1999	Sunshine Cops (陽光警察)	terrorist leader	
1999	The Golden Nightmare (黃金惡夢)	Shoichi Okawa	
1999	The Accident (心猿意馬)	Philip	
2000	Redgrass Sand (紅草灘之刀神)	Commander Dor	
2000	2000 AD (公元2000)	Kelvin Wong	
2000	Love Paradox (愛情敏感地帶)	Denver	
2000	The Vampire Combat (極速殭屍)	Hsu Yao-tu	
2000	Love Au Zen (愛情觀自在)	Lam Man-cheng	
2001	My Heart Will Go On (不死心靈)		
2001	Every Dog Has His Date (完美情人)	Mr. Lin	
2002	Naked Weapon (赤裸特工)	Ryuichi	
2003	Infernal Affairs II (無間道II)	Ngai Wing-chung	
2003	Killing the Wife (殺妻)		
2003	Danger Zone (新紮師姐之不安全地帶)	Tao Kar-chun	
2004	New Police Story (新警察故事)	Hoi	
2004	PTU File: Death Trap (PTU女警之偶然陷阱)	Ng Ka-ho	
2004	Forever Yours (浪漫春情)	Mike Leung	
2005	Drink, Drank, Drunk (千杯不醉)	Chef Hoi	
2005	Wife from Hell (妻骨未寒)	Ken Kwan Chi-yin	
2006	McDull, the Alumni (春田花花同學會)	hostage taker	
2006	The Heavenly Kings (四大天王)	Andrew Lin (himself)	
2006	21BJ (21點殺陣)		
2006	Rob-B-Hood (寶貝計劃)	Calvin	
2007	Fearless (愛裏沒有懼怕之恐懼森林)	Jack	
2007	Single Blog (單身部落)	Hoi	
2007	Mr. Cinema (老港正傳)	Chow Kai-chun	
2007	Chaos (三不管)	Cheung Tai-hoi	
2008	The Coffin	Jack	
2010	Triple Tap (槍王之王)	Billy Tsui & Warren Tsui	
2011	The Founding of a Party (建黨偉業)	Zhou Zuoren	
2011	A Beautiful Life (不再讓你孤單)	Andrew	
2012	The Man with the Iron Fists	Gemini Male	
2012	Hsue-shen Tsien (錢學森)	Luo Youlai	
2013	Piano Trojan		
2013	Love Again		
2013	Carpooling Shock		
2014	Ameera		
2014	Ex Fighting		
2015	The Man with the Iron Fists 2	Gemini Male	
2015	War on a String		
2015	To the Fore		
2016	Inside or Outside		
2018	Untraceable		
2018	Really?		
2018	The Bravest Escort Group		
2018	Bad Boy Symphony		
2019	Belgrade Escape		
2019	Great Marshal Canopy		

=== Television ===
Year	Title	Role	Notes
1997	Sons and Daughters of China (中華兒女)		
1997	The Immortal Fugitive (亡命天涯)		
1997	Happy Monk (開心出家人)	Ti Wei	
1999	Maid In Green (綠衣紅娘)	Xie Zhongliang	
2000	Under Cover (掃冰者)		
2001	Legendary Fighter: Yang's Heroine (楊門女將之女兒當自強)	Yang An	
2002	Moon Fairy (奔月)	He Bo	
2002	Quest (雪花女神龍)		
2004	ICAC Investigators 2004 (廉政行動2004)		
2004	The Last Breakthrough (天涯俠醫)	Ho Ching	
2006	My Boss My Hero (マイ★ボス マイ★ヒーロー)	Hong Kong gangster	
2007	The Fairies of Liaozhai (聊齋奇女子)	Master Qian	
2018	Negotiator (TV series) (谈判官)	Qi Ruhai	
