= Sword Stained with Royal Blood (1981 film) =

1981 Hong Kong film by Chang Cheh

- DVD cover
- 碧血劍
- Directed by: Chang Cheh
- Screenplay by: Chang Cheh; Ni Kuang
- Based on: Sword Stained with Royal Blood by Jin Yong
- Produced by: Runme Shaw
- Starring: Philip Kwok; Lu Feng; Chiang Sheng; Wong Lik; Wen Hseuh-erh; Lung Tung-sheng
- Cinematography: Cho Wai-Kei
- Edited by: Lee Yim-Hoi; Chiang Hsing-Lung
- Music by: Eddie H. Wang
- Production company: Shaw Brothers Studio
- Distributed by: Shaw Brothers Studio
- Release date: 6 March 1981 (Hong Kong)
- Running time: 102 minutes
- Country: Hong Kong
- Language: Mandarin

Sword Stained with Royal Blood (碧血劍) is a 1981 Hong Kong wuxia film produced by the Shaw Brothers Studio and directed by Chang Cheh, starring the Venom Mob. Adapted from the novel of the same title by Jin Yong, the film was one of the rarest wuxia films starring the Venom Mob, and it has since been digitally remastered and released by Celestial Pictures.

== Synopsis ==
The story follows the journey of a boy who grows up to become a great swordsman. After his father is wrongly executed by the emperor, Yuan Chengzhi is sent to learn martial arts from Mu Renqing. When he is old enough, he sets out to explore the jianghu and stumbles upon the hideout of a long-dead swordsman, "Golden Serpent Gentleman" Xia Xueyi, who has left behind his sword, a martial arts manual, and a collection of darts. Yuan also discovers the whereabouts of a lost treasure and instructions from Xia to deliver part of it to Wen Yi, Xia's lover.

On his quest to honour Xia Xueyi's wishes, Yuan meets Wen Qingqing, a young lady in disguise as a man, and befriends her. He follows her home and realises that she is from a clan of wealthy martial artists known for their formidable Five Elements Formation. Tensions rise during Yuan's stay in the Wen residence between Yuan and Qingqing's jealous cousin. Later, members of Yuan's martial arts school show up and accuse Qingqing of stealing from them.

Yuan intervenes to defuse the conflict and displays his swordsmanship skills, drawing the attention of the head of the Wen clan. It turns out that the Wens and Xia Xueyi are sworn enemies. Gradually, hidden truths about the Wen clan and their dark history are revealed through flashbacks. Yuan, now seen as Xia's heir, is forced to confront the Wens and their Five Elements Formation in order to survive and complete his quest.

== Cast ==
- Philip Kwok as Yuan Chengzhi
- Wen Hsueh-erh as Wen Qingqing
- Lung Tien-hsiang as Xia Xueyi
- Ching Li as Wen Yi
- Chiang Sheng as Wen Zheng
- Wong Lik as Wen Fangshan
- Lu Feng as Wen Nanyang
- Yu Tai-ping as Wen Beiyang
- Chu Ke as Wen Fang
- Chao Kuo as Cui Ximin
- Siao Yuk as Mei Jianhe
- Zhang Chiung-yu as Sun Zhongjun
- Chu Tit-wo as Huang Zhen
- Kwan Fung as Wen Fangda
- Jim Sum as Rong Cai
- Wang Hua as the mute
- Li Shouqi as Mu Renqing
- Wang Ching-ho as Taoist Musang
- Ng Hong-sang as Wen Fangshi
- Keung Hon as Wen Fangwu
- Lui Hong as Wen Yi's mother
