= War on a String =

- 悬战
- Directed by: Li Kai
- Release date: May 8, 2015
- Running time: 86 minutes
- Country: China
- Language: Mandarin
- Box office: CN¥390,000 (China)

War on a String (Chinese: 悬战) is a 2015 Chinese suspense crime action film directed by Li Kai. It was released on May 8, 2015 in China.

== Cast ==
- Vincent Chiao
- Andrew Lin
- Lin Jinfeng
- Han Qiuchi
- Qi Yunpeng
- Peng Bo
- Gao Fei
- Hu Shuangquan

== Reception ==
By May 8, 2015, the film had grossed CN¥390,000 at the Chinese box office.
