= Crimson Sabre =

2000 Hong Kong TV series

- DVD cover art
- Also known as: Sword Stained with Royal Blood
- 碧血劍
- Genre: Wuxia
- Based on: Sword Stained with Royal Blood by Jin Yong
- Directed by: Lee Tim-shing
- Starring: Gordon Lam; Charmaine Sheh; Kwong Wa; Melissa Ng; Sarah Au; Fiona Yuen
- Opening theme: "Clearly and Deeply Love You" (明明深愛著你) by Hacken Lee
- Ending theme: "Extreme Passionate Love" (熱愛終極) by Kwong Wah
- Country of origin: Hong Kong
- Original language: Cantonese
- No. of episodes: 35

Production
- Executive producer: Lee Tim-shing
- Production location: Hong Kong
- Running time: ≈45 minutes per episode
- Production company: TVB

Original release
- Network: TVB
- Release: 2000

Crimson Sabre (碧血劍) is a Hong Kong wuxia television series adapted from the novel Sword Stained with Royal Blood by Jin Yong. The series was first broadcast on TVB in Hong Kong in 2000.

== Cast ==
- Gordon Lam as Yuan Chengzhi
  - Lee Chun-leung as Yuan Chengzhi (child)
- Charmaine Sheh as Ajiu
- Kwong Wa as Xia Xueyi
  - Wu Yiu-fung as Xia Xueyi (child)
- Melissa Ng as Wen Yi / Wen Qian
  - Fung Ho-see as Wen Qian (child)
- Sarah Au as Xia Qingqing
- Fiona Yuen as He Tieshou
- Emily Kwan as He Hongyao
- Mak Cheung-ching as Yishen
- Lam King-kong as Hu Guinan
- Yeung Man-na as An Xiaohui
  - Wong Mei-kei as An Xiaohui (child)
- Chan On-ying as Lan Tieshou
- Ku Feng as Mu Renqing
- Chun Wong as Huang Zhen
- Tony Kwong as Gui Xinshu
- June Chan as Sun Zhongjun
- Yau Biu as Mei Jianhe
- Yu Tsi-ming as Musang
- Lee Kwok-lun as Yuzhenzi
- Henry Lo as Cheng Qingzhu
- Felix Lok as Li Zicheng
- Henry Lee as Li Yan
- Lo Hing-fai as Dorgon
- Ricky Wong as Wen Fangda
- Lau Kwai-fong as Wen Fangda's wife
- Kiu Hung as Wen Fangyi
- Tsang Wai-wan as Wen Fangyi's wife
- Lau Kong as Wen Fangshan
- Law Lan as Wen Fangshan's wife
- Lee Hung-kit as Wen Fangshi
- Wong Fung-leung as Wen Fangshi's wife
- Kwan Ching as Wen Fangwu
- Wong Sun-wai as Wen Fangwu's wife
- English Tang as Wen Zheng
- Lee Tze-kei as Wen Qi
- Wong Tak-bun as Tang Xian
- Yu San-kwong as Cao Huachun
- Wong Chi-wah as Yuan Chonghuan
- Lily Liu as Yuan Chonghuan's wife
- Wong Wai as the Chongzhen Emperor
- Joe Ma as Long Tian
- Law Kwan-tso as Wang Yingchao
- Cheung Ying-choi as Zhou Yanru
- Suen Gwai-hing as Wen Tiren
- Chiu Shek-man as Gao Jie
- Ling Hon as Liang Tingdong
- Chan Wing-chun as Sha Tianguang
- Chan Tik-hak as Chu Hongliu
- Paul Che as Lü Qi
- Jerry Ku as Hutoutuo
- Cheung Hon-ban as Jiao Gongli
- Siu Cheuk-yiu, Mak Ka-lun and Wong Man-biu as the Taibai Sanying
- Fong Kit as Rong Cai
- Lily Li as Xinggu
- Lau Dan as Hong Taiji
- Sze Mun as Consort Zhuang
- Wong Tin-chak as Niu Jinxing
- Yip Chun-sing as Liu Zongmin
- Kwok Tak-shun as Qian Tongsi
- Doi Chi-wai as Qi Yun'ao
- Tong Chun-ming as Zhu Cilang
- Raymond Lam as a masked intruder
