= Law-lin Tsi =

Chinese actress and Cantonese opera singer

- Chinese: 紫羅蓮
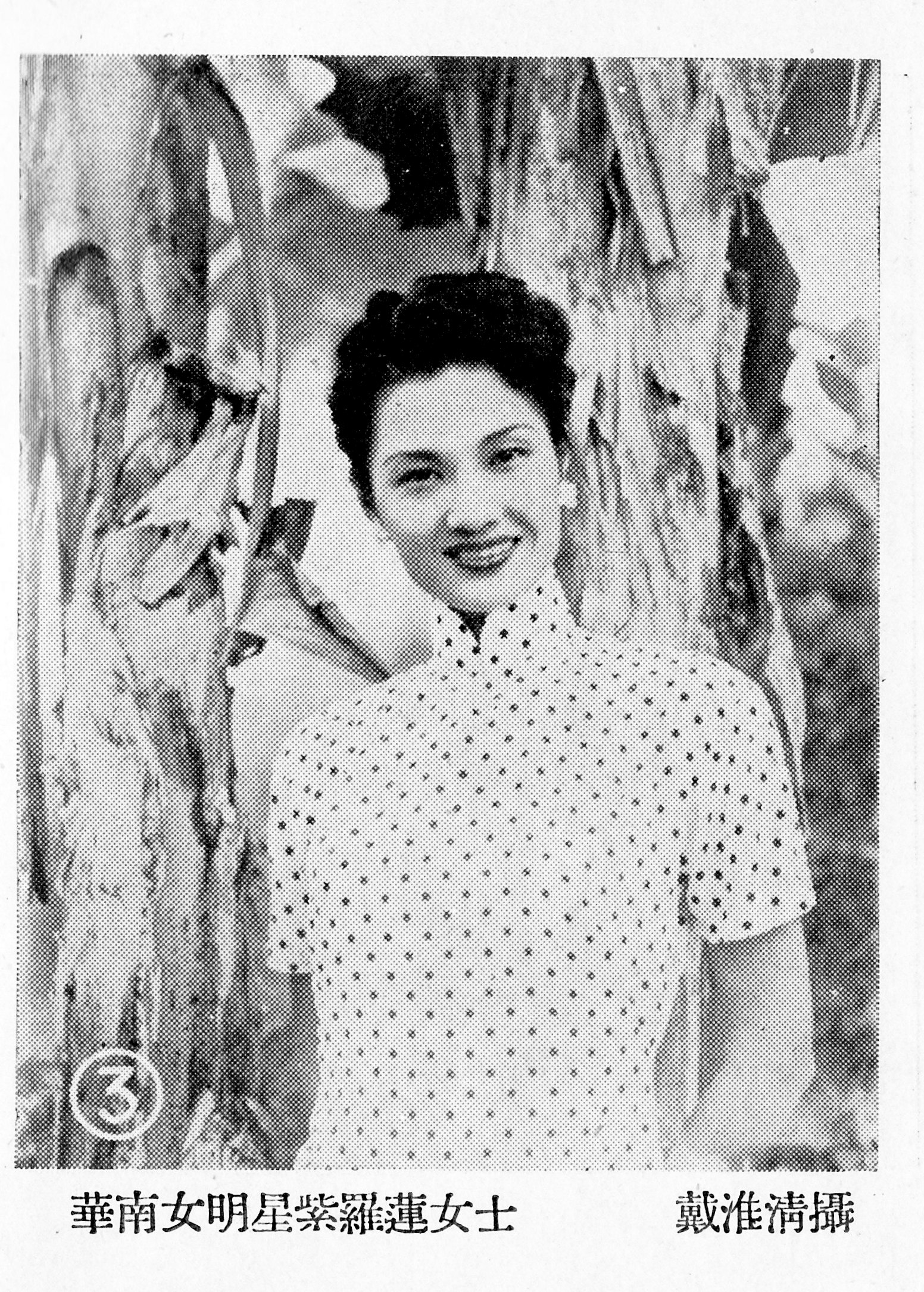
- Tsi in 1952
- Born: Chow Kit Lin; 1924; Yunfu, Guangdong province, China
- Died: 2015 (aged 90–91); Hong Kong
- Other names: Chi Lo-Lien, Chi Law Lin, Tsi Law-Lin, Tsi Lo-Lin, Zi Luolian
- Occupations: Actress; Cantonese opera singer
- Years active: 1940–1966
- Known for: Co-founder of Union Film Enterprises Ltd, Founder of Tsi Lo Lin Film Company

Law-lin Tsi (Chinese: 紫羅蓮; 1924 – 2015) was a former Chinese actress and Cantonese opera singer from Hong Kong. Tsi is credited with over 140 films.

== Early life ==
In 1924, Tsi was born as Chow Kit Lin in Yunfu, Guangdong province, China.

== Career ==
At age 12, Tsi learned Cantonese opera. In 1937, at age 14, Tsi started her Cantonese opera singing career with Tai Ping Opera Troupe and Kok Sin Sing Opera Troupe. In 1939, Tsi crossed over as an actress in Hong Kong films. Tsi first appeared in Eighth Heaven, a 1939 film and in Rivals in Love, a 1939 film. Tsi also appeared in One Hundred Thousand Children's Corpses, a 1940 Cantonese opera film directed by But Fu. In 1952, Tsi co-founded Union Film Enterprises Ltd, a film production company. Tsi appeared as Ming Fung in Family, a 1953 historical drama film directed by Ng Wui, and it was a film debut for Union Film Enterprise. Tsi also appeared as a lead actress in In the Face of Demolition, a 1953 drama film directed by Lee Tit. Tsi founded Tsi Lo Lin Film Company. In 1954, Tsi became a writer, director, producer, and lead actress in Love in Malaya (aka Malaya Love Affair), a drama film. Tsi is known for her role as a demure lady or a period beautiful wife. In 1964, Tsi retired from the film. Tsi's last film was The Flying Killer (aka The Female Chivalry), a 1966 fantasy action science fiction film directed by Chien Lung. Tsi is credited with over 140 films.

== Filmography ==
=== Films ===
This is a partial list of films.

- 1939 Eighth Heaven
- 1939 Rivals in Love
- 1940 One Hundred Thousand Children's Corpses
- 1941 Bridge of Jealousy
- 1948 Return of the Swallows - Wong Oi-Ming
- 1953 Family - Ming Fung
- 1954 In the Face of Demolition
- 1954 Love in Malaya (aka Malaya Love Affair) - Leung Yuk Git, also as writer, director, and producer
- 1954 Sworn Sisters - Ying
- 1955 The Lone Swan
- 1956 The Dunce Attends a Birthday Party - 3rd Sister
- 1956 The Precious Lotus Lamp - Holy Mother of Mount Hua
- 1957 Hen-pecked Husband
- 1957 The Splendour of Youth - Han Xiangying
- 1966 The Flying Killer (aka The Female Chivalry)

== Awards ==
- Star. Avenue of Stars. Tsim Sha Tsui waterfront in Hong Kong.

== Personal life ==
In 1950-51, Tsi traveled to Malaya during a theatre tour. Tsi had three daughters. In the 1960s, Tsi lived with her daughters in Seattle, Washington. In 2011, Tsi lived in Canada. On December 24, 2015, Tsi died in Hong Kong.
