= Sword Stained with Royal Blood (2007 TV series) =

2007 Chinese TV series

- DVD cover art
- 碧血剑
- Genre: Wuxia
- Based on: Sword Stained with Royal Blood by Jin Yong
- Directed by: Zhang Jizhong; Li Hantao
- Starring: Bobby Dou; Eva Huang; Sun Feifei; Hsiao Shu-shen; Vincent Chiao; Yu Chenghui; He Qing; Ma Su; Wu Ma
- Opening theme: "Good Lads" (好男儿) by Han Lei
- Ending theme: "Be Together with You" (和你在一起) by Sun Nan
- Country of origin: China
- Original language: Mandarin
- No. of episodes: 35 (VCD version); 30 (DVD version)

Production
- Producers: Zhang Jizhong; Pu Shulin
- Production location: China
- Running time: ≈45 minutes per episode

Original release
- Network: CTV
- Release: 1 February – 7 March 2007

Sword Stained with Royal Blood (碧血剑) is a 2007 Chinese wuxia television series adapted from the novel of the same title by Jin Yong. Starring cast members from mainland China and Taiwan, the series was produced by Zhang Jizhong and first broadcast on CTV in Taiwan in 2007.

== Cast ==
- Bobby Dou as Yuan Chengzhi
- Eva Huang as Xia Qingqing
- Sun Feifei as Ajiu
- Hsiao Shu-shen as He Tieshou
- Ma Su as An Xiaohui
- Zhao Yi as An Jianqing
- Wang Luyao as An Daniang
- Tian Zhong as Cui Ximin
- Guo Jin as He Hongyao
- Gao Hu as the Chongzhen Emperor
- Vincent Chiao as Xia Xueyi
- Cheng Haofeng as Li Yan
- Xu Baihui as Hongniangzi
- Wang Weiguo as Li Zicheng
- Wang Wensheng as Liu Zongmin
- He Qing as Wen Yi
- Yu Chenghui as Mu Renqing
- Ji Qilin as Musang
- Liu Naiyi as Yuzhenzi
- Chen Zhou as Huang Zhen
- Wang Gang as Gui Xinshu
- He Sirong as Gui Erniang
- Han Xiao as Sun Zhongjun
- Zhang Yakun as Mei Jianhe
- Su Mao as Sun Zhongtao
- Yang Niansheng as Cheng Qingzhu
- Wu Ting as Jiao Wan'er
- Wu Ma as Wen Fangda
- Hou Yueqiu as Wen Fangyi
- Guo Hongjie as Wen Fangshan
- Zhang Hengping as Wen Fangwu
- Bai Junjie as Wen Fangshi
- Li Ming as Hui Guinan
- Zhou Xiaobin as Hong Shenghai
- Li Dongguo as Min Zihua
- Liu Pizhong as Sha Tianguang
- Li Chengru as Hong Taiji
- Ba Yin as Dorgon
- Li Wenying as Consort Zhuang
- Hu Qingshi as Cao Huachun
- Hao Yiping as Zu Dashou
- Ren Xuehai as Fan Wencheng
- Zhang Jizhong as Meng Bofei
- Ma Jielin as Qi Yun'ao
- Sun Jiaolong as Ding You
- Wang Jiusheng as Zhang Chaotang
- Sun Wei as Dongxuan
