= On the Way (film) =

- Theatrical poster
- Directed by: Kim Poog-ki
- Starring: Wen Zhang; Eva Huang; Ji Jin-hee; Cha Soo-yeon
- Release date: March 28, 2014 (China)
- Running time: 94 mins
- Countries: China; South Korea
- Languages: Mandarin; Korean
- Box office: US$3,220,000

On the Way (Chinese: 我在路上最爱你; Korean: 길 위에서) is a 2014 Chinese-South Korean drama-romance film directed by Kim Poog-ki and starring Wen Zhang, Eva Huang, Ji Jin-hee and Cha Soo-yeon.

== Cast ==
- Wen Zhang
- Eva Huang
- Ji Jin-hee
- Cha Soo-yeon
