= Sword Stained with Royal Blood (1977 TV series) =

1977 Hong Kong TV series

- 碧血劍
- Genre: Wuxia
- Based on: Sword Stained with Royal Blood by Jin Yong
- Starring: Chan Keung; Wen Hsueh-erh; Ann Lee; Dean Shek
- Country of origin: Hong Kong
- Original language: Cantonese

Original release
- Network: CTV

Sword Stained with Royal Blood (碧血劍) is a Hong Kong television series adapted from the novel of the same title by Jin Yong. It was first broadcast on CTV in Hong Kong in 1977.

== Cast ==
- Chan Keung as Yuan Chengzhi
- Wen Hsueh-erh as Xia Qingqing
- Ann Lee as Ajiu
- Dean Shek as Xia Xueyi
- Wu Yan-yan as Wen Yi
- Yuen Qiu as He Tieshou
- Bonnie Ngai as He Hongyao
- Lai See-man as Jiao Wan'er
- Suen Kwai-hing as Jiao Gongli
- Chan Fei-lung as Wen Fangda
- Kam Kong as Wen Fangyi
- Bak Man-biu as Wen Fangshan
- Lau Kong as Huang Zhen
- Yeung Chak-lam as Mu Renqing
- Cheung Man-ting as Gui Erniang
