= Vincent Chiao =

Taiwanese actor and singer

- 焦恩俊
- Born: 7 November 1967 (age 57); Chiayi City, Taiwan
- Occupations: Actor; singer
- Years active: 1986–present
- Spouses: Huang Wan-lin (m. 1994; div. 2005) Lin Chien-yu (m. 2014)
- Children: 2 daughters (b. 1995 & 1997)

Chinese name
- Traditional Chinese: 焦恩俊
Transcriptions
Standard Mandarin
- Hanyu Pinyin: Jiāo Ēnjùn
Yue: Cantonese
- Jyutping: Ziu^{1} Jan^{1}-zeon^{3}
Southern Min
- Hokkien POJ: Chiau Un-chùn
- Musical career
- Also known as: Vincent Jiao; Vincent Chiu; Vincent Jiu

Chiao En-chun (born 7 November 1967), also known as Vincent Chiao, is a Taiwanese actor and Mandopop singer. He is best known for portraying heroes in costume television dramas.

== Filmography ==
=== Films ===
Year	Title	Role	Notes
1986	The Kinmen Bombs (八二三砲戰)		
1986	The Story of Dr. Sun Yat-Sen (國父傳)		
1988	Lai Shi, China's Last Eunuch (中國最後一個太監)		
1992	Passionate Dream (劍霸天下)		
1993	Drug Tiger ('93街頭霸王)		
1999	Thunder Cops (神探幻影)		
1999	Four Chefs and a Feast (春風得意梅龍鎮)		
2007	Autumn's Dance (秋之舞)	Qiu Qianli	TV film
2009	Friendship Unto Death (雷橫與朱仝)	Zhu Tong	TV film
2010	Unusual Love (驚情)	Guan Ning	
2011	Super Player (大玩家)	emperor	
2012	He-Man (硬汉2:奉陪到底)	Captain Han	
2013	I Am Director (疯狂的导演)	himself	cameo
2013	Return the Money (啊朋友还钱)	Zeng Siyuan	
2015	Gun Transit (枪过境)	Captain Yu	
2015	War on a String (悬战)	Jiang Dong	
2015	Where Are All The Time (时间都去哪了)	Engineer Yao	

=== Television series ===
Year	Title	Role	Notes
1993	Justice Pao (包青天)	Liu Yunlong	
1994	The Seven Heroes and Five Gallants (七俠五義)	Zhan Zhao	
1995	Justice Pao (包青天)	Bai Yutang	
1996	Flower Blooms Flower Withers (花落花開)		
1997	The Strange Cases of Lord Shih (施公奇案)	Huang Tianba	
1998	The Heroine of the Yangs (穆桂英)	Yang Zongbao	
1999	Hua Mulan (花木蘭)	Yu Cheng'en	
1999	Return of Judge Bao (包公出巡)	Zhan Zhao	
1999	Legend of Dagger Li (小李飛刀)	Li Xunhuan	
2001	Madam White Snake (白蛇新傳)	Shi Junbao / Fahai	
2004	The Lotus Lantern (寶蓮燈)	Erlang Shen	
2005	The Romantic King of Dramas (風流戲王)	Li Yu	
2007	The Shadow of Empress Wu (日月凌空)	Helan Minzhi	
2007	Sword Stained with Royal Blood (碧血劍)	Xia Xueyi	
2010	The Lotus Lantern Fable (寶蓮燈前傳)	Erlang Shen	
2010	Ancient Legends (遠古的傳說)	Shennong	

== Discography ==
=== Albums / EPs ===
Album / EP	Track listing
Vincent Chiao (焦恩俊): Released: 4 March 2009; Label: SSM (声视美)	1. "Gongfu" (功夫; "Kungfu"); 2. "Shou'er Zhi Lian" (首尔之恋; "Seoul Love"); 3. "Zhende Hen Tong" (真的很痛; "Really Hurts"); 4. "Sanshengshi" (三生石; "Karma Stone" — duet with Zhou Qiqi); 5. "Gongfu" [Remix]
Mr. Vincent (文森特先生): Released: 18 December 2011; Label: Huafanxing (华凡星)	1. "Haibian" (海边; "Seaside"); 2. "Houniao" (候鸟; "Migratory Bird"); 3. "Pugongying" (蒲公英; "Dandelion"); 4. "Beijixing" (北极星; "North Star"); 5. "Shouhou Jimo" (守候寂寞; "Guarding Loneliness"); 6. "Yunduan de Tianshi" (云端的天使; "Angel in the Clouds")

=== Other songs ===
- "Duoshao Gushi Neng Wanmei" (多少故事能完美; "How Many Stories Are Required for Perfection") — insert song for the 2003 TV series Wolf Hero
- "Wo de Tianxia" (我的天下; "My World" — duet with Liu Xiaoxue) — theme song for the 2012 TV series Beauty in the South
