= Yang Wenguang =

- Family name: Yáng (楊); Given name: Wénguǎng (文廣) courtesy name: Zhòngróng (仲容)
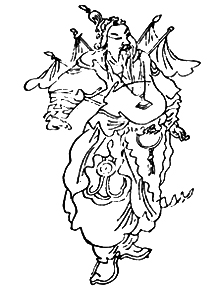
- from the 1815 novel Complete Legends of Later Song Crown Prince Ciyun's Flee from Disaster and Travels in the Country (後宋慈雲太子逃難走國全傳)
- Died: 1074; Dingzhou, Hebei
- Parent(s): Yang Zongbao, father Mu Guiying, mother
- Relatives: Yang Chuanyong (楊傳永), brother Yang Dezheng (楊德政), brother Yang Jinhua (楊金花), sister

Yang Wenguang
- Traditional Chinese: 楊文廣
- Simplified Chinese: 杨文广
Transcriptions
Standard Mandarin
- Hanyu Pinyin: Yáng Wénguǎng
- Wade–Giles: Yang^{2} Wen^{2}-kuang^{3}
Yue: Cantonese
- Yale Romanization: Yeung^{4} Man^{4}-gwong^{2}
- Jyutping: Joeng^{4} Man^{4}-gwong^{2}

Yang Wenguang (Chinese: 楊文廣; died 1074) was a general in ancient China's Northern Song dynasty.

Historically, Yang Wenguang is the grandson of Yang Yanzhao and Princess Chai; and the great grandson of Yang Ye which are depicted in the various stories of Yang clan warriors.

== Biography ==
In 1044, Fan Zhongyan was dispatched to the Shaanxi area and met with Yang Wenguang. He was impressed and took Yang as his subordinate. In 1052, Yang Wenguang followed Di Qing in the expedition to Guangxi and helped defeat Nong Zhigao's rebellion. Afterwards he was promoted by Emperor Yingzong. Later, he built several forts in Shaanxi and successfully resisted several Western Xia invasion attempts. During Emperor Shenzong's reign, he was stationed in Dingzhou. He offered the emperor his strategy on recovering lost territories from the Khitans shortly before he died at the frontier.

== In fiction ==
In fiction, Yang Wenguang is the son of Yang Zongbao and Mu Guiying.
